= House of Stasov =

Russian noble family

- Noble family
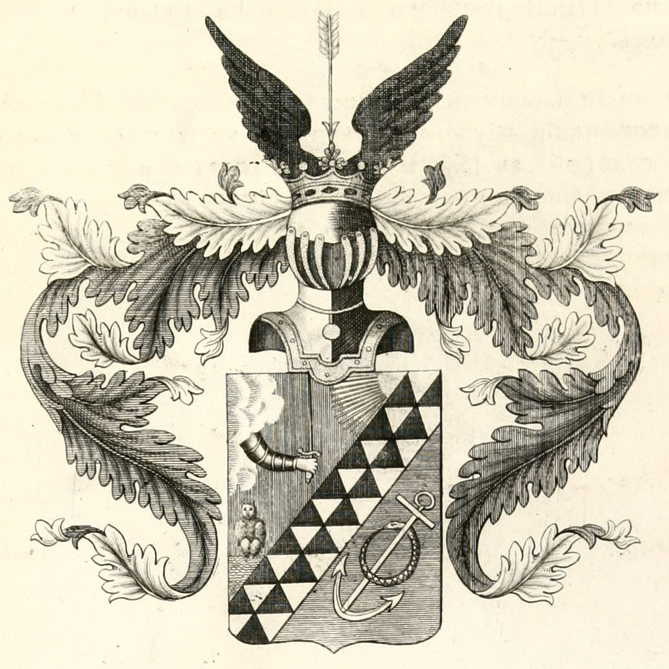
- Current region: Russia
- Origin: Moscow, Russia
- Founded: 16th century
- Founder: Dmitri Vasilevich Stasov

The House of Stasov (Russian: Стасов́) is a Russian noble family founded by Stasov Dmitri Vasilevich, in 16th century.

== Notable people ==
- Duke Vasily Petrovich Stasov (1769–1848), architect
  - His daughter, Duchess Nadezhda Vasilievna Stasova (1822–1895), was a philanthropist and women's rights activist. She organized weekend schools for workers and daycares for workers’ children. She also helped found the Bestuzhev Courses, which made higher education available to Russian women for the first time.
  - His son, Count Dmitry Vasilievich Stasov (1828–1918), was an advocate who took part in the foundation of the Russian Music Society.
    - Dmitri's daughter, Elena Dmitryevna Stasova (1873–1966), joined the Communist movement in 1898. As a leader of the Bolshevik Party in St. Petersburg she was exiled to Siberia in 1913–16. After the Russian Revolution of 1917 Stasova was a secretary of the Bolshevik party and from 1921–1926 a Comintern representative to the Communist Party of Germany.
    - Dmitri's daughter, Varvara Komarova-Stasova (1862–1942), was a writer and musicologist, who published under the pen name Vladimir Karenin.
  - His son Duke Vladimir Vasilievich Stasov (1824–1906), Russian critic.

== See also ==
- Stasov, other people with the surname.
