= Stasova =

Stasova may refer to:

- Feminine form of the Russian surname Stasov
- Stašová, feminine form of the Czech surname Staš
