= Stasov =

Stasov, feminine: Stasova is a Russian-language surname associated with the Russian noble House of Stasov. Notable people with the surname include:

- Dmitry Stasov (1828–1918), Russian lawyer
- Elena Stasova (1873–1966), Bolshevik Party functionary
- Nadezhda Vasilievna Stasova (1822–1895), philanthropist and women's rights activist
- Pavel Stasov (1936–2018) Soviet and Russian archer and arching coach
- Vasily Stasov (1769–1848), Russian architect
- Varvara Komarova-Stasova (1862–1942), was a writer and musicologist
- Vladimir Stasov (1824–1906), Russian critic of music and art

== See also ==
- Stašov (disambiguation)
- Stasov, Astrakhan Oblast, rural locality in Russia
