= Stašov =

Stašov may refer to places in the Czech Republic:

- Stašov (Beroun District), a municipality and village in the Central Bohemian Region
- Stašov (Svitavy District), a municipality and village in the Pardubice Region

== See also ==
- Stasov, Russian surname
- Staš
