= Standing Stables (Pushkin) =

Standing Stables, Pushkin
- Дежурные конюшни
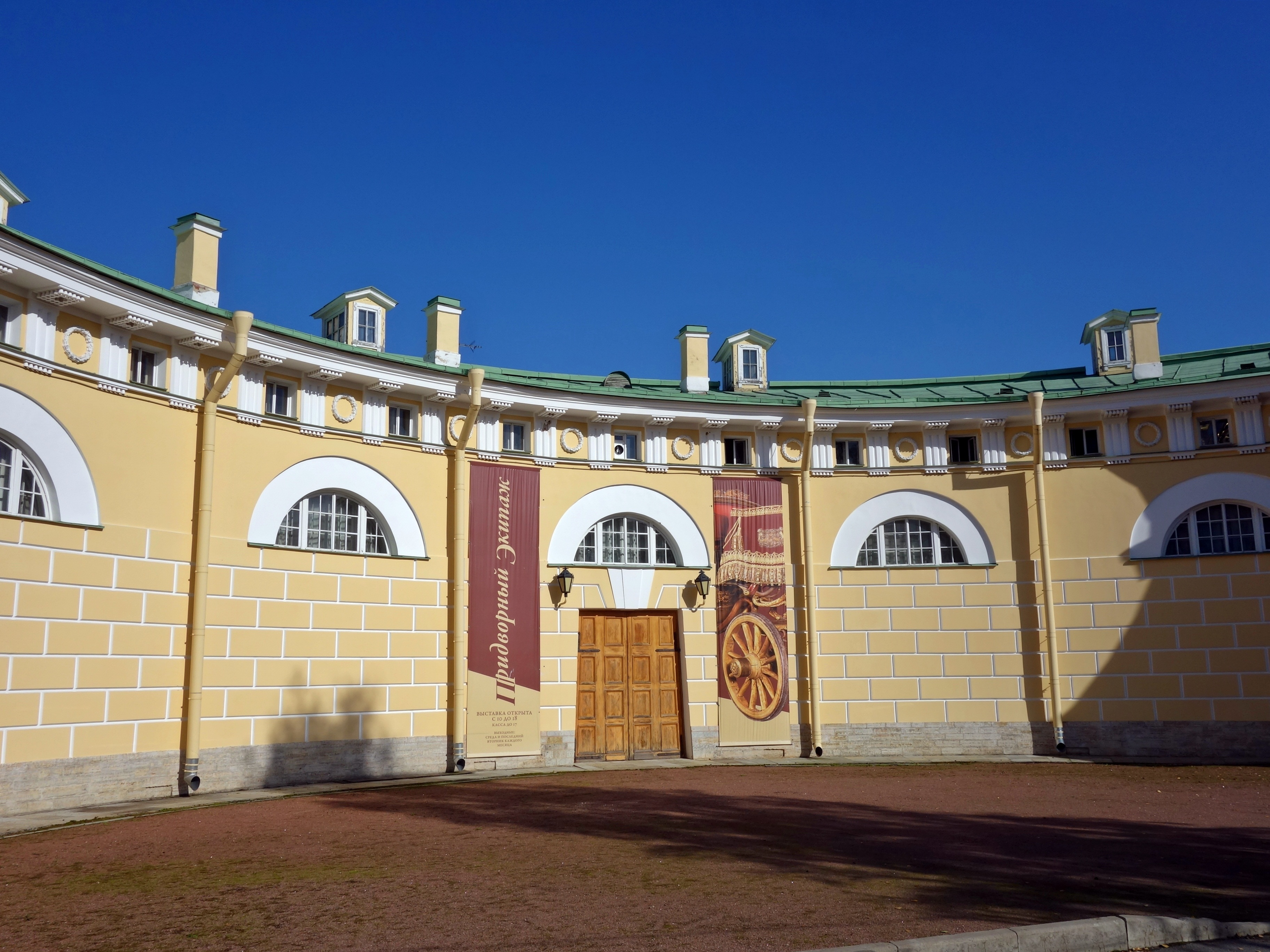
- Interactive map of the Standing Stables, Pushkin area

General information
- Architectural style: Classicism
- Location: Pushkin, 8 Sadovaya Street
- Coordinates: 59°43′03″N 30°23′57″E
- Construction started: 1822
- Completed: 1823

Design and construction
- Architect: S. L. Shustov
- Other designers: V. P. Stasov

The Standing Stables, located in Pushkin, Saint Petersburg, were built in 1823 as the stables for the court of Alexander I by the architect Vasily Stasov. The building is currently occupied by a permanent exhibition of court carriages, “The Court Crew in Tsarskoe Selo”.

== History ==
The building is characterized by its semi-circular shape and trapezoidal doorways. These techniques were perfected by Stasov as he developed projects for food depots and other similar buildings. Construction was led by S. L. Shustovwho increased the length and height from the architect's original design. The building was completed and handed over to the palace department in April 1827.

In 1939, the stables were turned into a garage for buses. During World War II they were damaged by artillery shelling, but were subsequently restored. In 1990, the Standing Stables became part of the Tsarskoye Selo museum-reserve.

== Architecture ==
The stables are in the last block, behind the residences for the cavalry. According to the architect's plan, buildings were united through interconnecting passages. Shaped as a semi-circle, the stable walls and doorways widen downwards, creating a unique effect. The walls end with a Doric frieze of triglyphs, metopes and a cornice. The frieze was decorated with stucco horse heads and wreaths which were lost in World War II. The roof is shaped like a gable, with triangular pediments at the ends. Parts of the wall facade at the bottom are decorated with rustic wood finish. Two-thirds of the way up along the walls are the unique semicircular windows.
