= Maria Trubnikova =

Russian philanthropist and feminist (1835–1897)

- Мария Трубникова
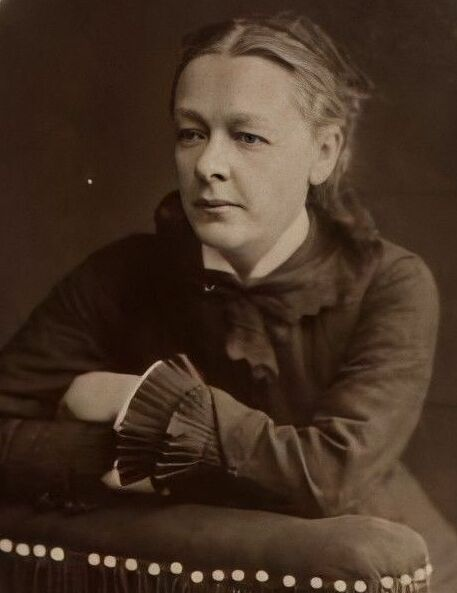
- Born: 6 January 1835; Chita, Irkutsk Governorate, Russian Empire
- Died: 28 April 1897 (aged 62); Saint Petersburg, Russian Empire
- Occupation: Activist
- Movement: Feminism in Russia
- Spouse: Konstantin Trubnikov (m. 1854; sep. 1876)
- Children: 7

Maria Vasilievna Trubnikova (Note: In this name that follows East Slavic naming customs, the patronymic is Vasilievna and the family name is Trubnikova.) (Russian: Мария Васильевна Трубникова, née Ivasheva [Ивашева]; 6 January 1835 – 28 April 1897) was a Russian feminist, activist and women's rights champion in the 19th century.

Of mixed Russian and French heritage, Trubnikova was orphaned at an early age and subsequently raised by a wealthy relative. She married at 19, and she and her husband, Konstantin, had seven children. In adulthood, Trubnikova hosted a women-only salon in Saint Petersburg which became a center of feminist activism. She also maintained international connections to fellow feminists in England, France, and other countries. Alongside Anna Filosofova and Nadezhda Stasova, whom she mentored, Trubnikova was one of the earliest leaders of the Russian women's movement.

Together, the three friends and allies were referred to as the "triumvirate". They founded and led several organizations designed to promote women's cultural and economic independence, including a publishing cooperative. Subsequently, they successfully pushed government officials to allow higher education for women, although continuing opposition meant that their achievements were sometimes limited or reversed. In later life, Trubnikova experienced severe illness and personal difficulties. She died in 1897.

== Early life ==
Maria Vasilievna Ivasheva was born on 6 January 1835 in Chita, a city in the Far East of the Russian Empire. She was the second of four children. Her father, Vasily Ivashev, had been a participant in the Decembrist Revolt ten years earlier and had consequently been exiled to Siberia. Ivasheva's mother, Camille LeDentu (alternately "LeDantieux"), was of French descent. Both her parents died when she was very young: her father in 1839, her mother, in childbirth, the following year.

Subsequently, Ivasheva was raised by a wealthier aunt, the Princess Ekaterina Khovanskaia. (Note: Among the Russian nobility, the title of "Prince" or "Princess" (knyaz / князь) did not imply a direct relationship with the ruling family, but was used by many aristocratic families.) She received a high-quality education (by the standards of the time) from private tutors. At age 19, in 1854, she married Konstantin Trubnikov, a landowner and government official, and took his name (in feminine form, Trubnikova). Trubnikov's liberalism appealed to Trubnikova. He wooed her by "reading [her] passages of Herzen", a Russian radical writer. She and Trubnikov had seven children (including Olga)—although only four, all daughters, survived to adulthood. Trubnikov, using Trubnikova's inheritance from her aunt for funding, became a stock trader and founded a newspaper, Birzhevyie Vedomosti.

In the early years of her marriage, Trubnikova was frequently pregnant and confined to the home, but took the opportunity to read widely and self-educate. She was influenced by French writers such as Jules Michelet, Pierre-Joseph Proudhon, and Henri de Saint-Simon, as well as others like Kant, Plato, and Heine. In her personal life, according to the historian Barbara Engel, Trubnikova was "more of a nonconformist than a rebel", happy to wear men's attire on the family's country estate when accompanied only by her daughters, but swiftly changing into feminine garb when joined by her husband. Trubnikov was despotic and unyielding in domestic affairs.

== Career ==
Trubnikova hosted a popular mixed-gender social salon in the capital Saint Petersburg, and established a women-only salon in 1855 as an offshoot. Women who hosted these mixed-gender salons were frequently idealized as being merely spurs for male creativity. Trubnikova, however, actively sought to educate fellow women on feminist issues, seeing her new salon as way to connect and empower them. Trubnikova used any opportunity to recruit women to her cause; for instance, during a routine medical appointment, she convinced her doctor to send his wife to the salon. The historian Natalia Novikova describes her as "candid, considerate, [and] a convincing speaker".

Trubnikova, Nadezhda Stasova and Anna Filosofova (two other members of Trubnikova's salon) became close friends and allies, and were referred to by their contemporaries as the "triumvirate". Filosofova and Stasova both wrote that they had been "empty-headed" before their friendship with her. The three became leaders of the feminist movement in the Russian Empire, though they did not describe themselves as feminists. The historian Richard Stites describes the triumvirate as "the three major [feminist] figures", who drew on support from wider circles of dozens of women who "moved in and out" of various roles. The later author Ariadna Tyrkova-Williams wrote that "[The triumvirate's] members perfectly complemented one another. The plans and will came from Trubnikova. Stasova's part was the performance, the persistence in doing the job. Filosofova embodied spirituality and ethics". In contrast to the contemporaneous Russian nihilist movement, Trubnikova and the other members of the triumvirate were not radical in public style or fashion, and retained their stations in the good graces of the upper class.

The triumvirate, alongside several others, founded the Society for Cheap Lodgings and Other Benefits for the Citizens of St. Petersburg in 1859. The group had two factions, the "German party" and the "Russian party", which differed on their preferred approach. (Note: The "Germans" were primarily descended from German or Baltic aristocratic families, according to Stites.) The "Germans" favoured a then-traditional method of philanthropy that involved close supervision of the poor. The "Russians" focused on self-help and direct aid, attempting to avoid patronization and to maintain the privacy of those aided. In early 1861, the organization split in two, with the Stasova-Trubnikova-Filosofova triumvirate leading the "Russians". The reduced group's charter was approved by the Tsarist government in February 1861, and Trubnikova was unanimously selected as its first chairwoman. The organization provided housing and work as seamstresses to its female clients (primarily widows and wives whose husbands had abandoned them). It included a day care and a communal kitchen.

=== International connections and push for education ===
While in France in mid-1861, Trubnikova read Jenny d'Héricourt's La femme affranchie, and began corresponding with its author. Through d'Héricourt, she also became connected with Josephine Butler and John Stuart Mill. Mill became a supporter of her efforts in Russia, and their correspondence provided a source of inspiration for his work The Subjection of Women. During this period, Trubnikova also worked at the paper founded by her husband, Birzhevyie Vedomosti, as a translator and editor.

In 1863, Trubnikova, Stasova, and Anna Engelhardt founded the Russian Women's Publishing Cooperative (Russian: Женский издательский кооператив, Zhenskiy Izdatel'skiy Kooperativ). Employing upwards of thirty women, the cooperative focused on writing and translation. It published a wide variety of books, including textbooks, scientific works and children's stories, such as Darwin's On the Origin of Species and Hans Christian Andersen's Fairy Tales. Although it was initially successful, the cooperative never received governmental approval, and suffered financial difficulties after Trubnikova and Stasova went abroad and its bookselling partner went bankrupt. Nevertheless, under Filosofova's management, it lasted until 1879.

Trubnikova and Stasova began pushing, in 1867, for Russian universities to create courses open to women. The campaign began with a meeting at Trubnikova's home between scores of interested women and (male) scholars, where a plan of action was agreed upon. The women wrote a petition to Karl Fedorovich Kessler, the rector of the St. Petersburg University. With a particular talent for organizing widespread support, they gathered over 400 signatures among middle- and upper-class women. Seeking the establishment of a women's university, the triumvirate received support from Kessler to create "regular, serious courses" open to women, in the words of historian Christine Johanson.

The next step was to obtain approval from Dmitry Andreyevich Tolstoy, who was responsible for the education system as the Minister of National Enlightenment. Tolstoy argued that women would abandon education after being married, and dismissed the signatories by stating that they were "sheep" merely following the latest fashion. He rejected the petition in late 1868, but under pressure from Tsar Alexander II, allowed less-advanced, mixed-gender public lectures which women could attend. These were rapidly taken up, overwhelmingly by women. Throughout the campaign, Trubnikova kept foreign correspondents apprised of their progress, and received support from Mill and the French feminist writer André Leo.

In Tsarist Russia, state policy was poorly coordinated and inconsistent due to the competing interests of rival ministers, and the triumvirate looked for another path to support higher education for women. They appealed to the more liberal war minister Dmitry Milyutin, who, persuaded by his wife, daughter, and Filosofova, agreed to host courses for women in Saint Petersburg. Tolstoy countered by permitting the classes, but at his own quarters, where he could monitor them. The political movement in favour of women's education continued to grow, and by October 1869, the Russian government permitted a limited set of courses for women on advanced subjects (including chemistry, history, anatomy, zoology, and Russian literature). The courses began in January 1870. Attended by more than 200 women, they became known as the Vladimirskii courses, after their host from 1872, the Vladimir college.

=== Later life ===
In 1869, Trubnikova left Russia temporarily to seek treatment for mental illness, and to meet Butler and Marie Goegg in Switzerland. Internationally, Trubnikova was seen as one of the foremost women of the Russian feminist movement. But by this time her husband had grown much less liberal, becoming implacably opposed to her activism. He had also lost much of her inheritance in the stock market. Upon her return to Russia in 1876, Trubnikova and her husband separated, and she struggled for money. Her daughters, who had become radical activists, began to support her, and she also worked as a writer and translator. Trubnikova hosted meetings of illegal societies at her house, and once helped hide the revolutionary Sophia Perovskaya (who coordinated the assassination of Alexander II).

By 1878, her illness resulted in her becoming much less active, although she continued to perform translations and worked for the release of two of her daughters following their arrests in 1881. Trubnikova moved to the countryside near Tambov in 1882, returning to Saint Petersburg for visits in 1888 and 1890. In 1892, she helped organize food aid in response to the famine in Tambov Oblast. A severe flu over the winter of 1893 to 1894 worsened Trubnikova's condition, and she was moved to an asylum. She died at Saint Petersburg's asylum on 28 April 1897 in the embrace of one of her daughters. Trubnikova was interred at the Novodevichy Cemetery in Saint Petersburg, and remembered by her colleagues as the pith of feminist activism in Russia.
