= Office of the Police Chief =

Building of historical significance in Saint Petersburg, Russia

- Управление полицмейстера
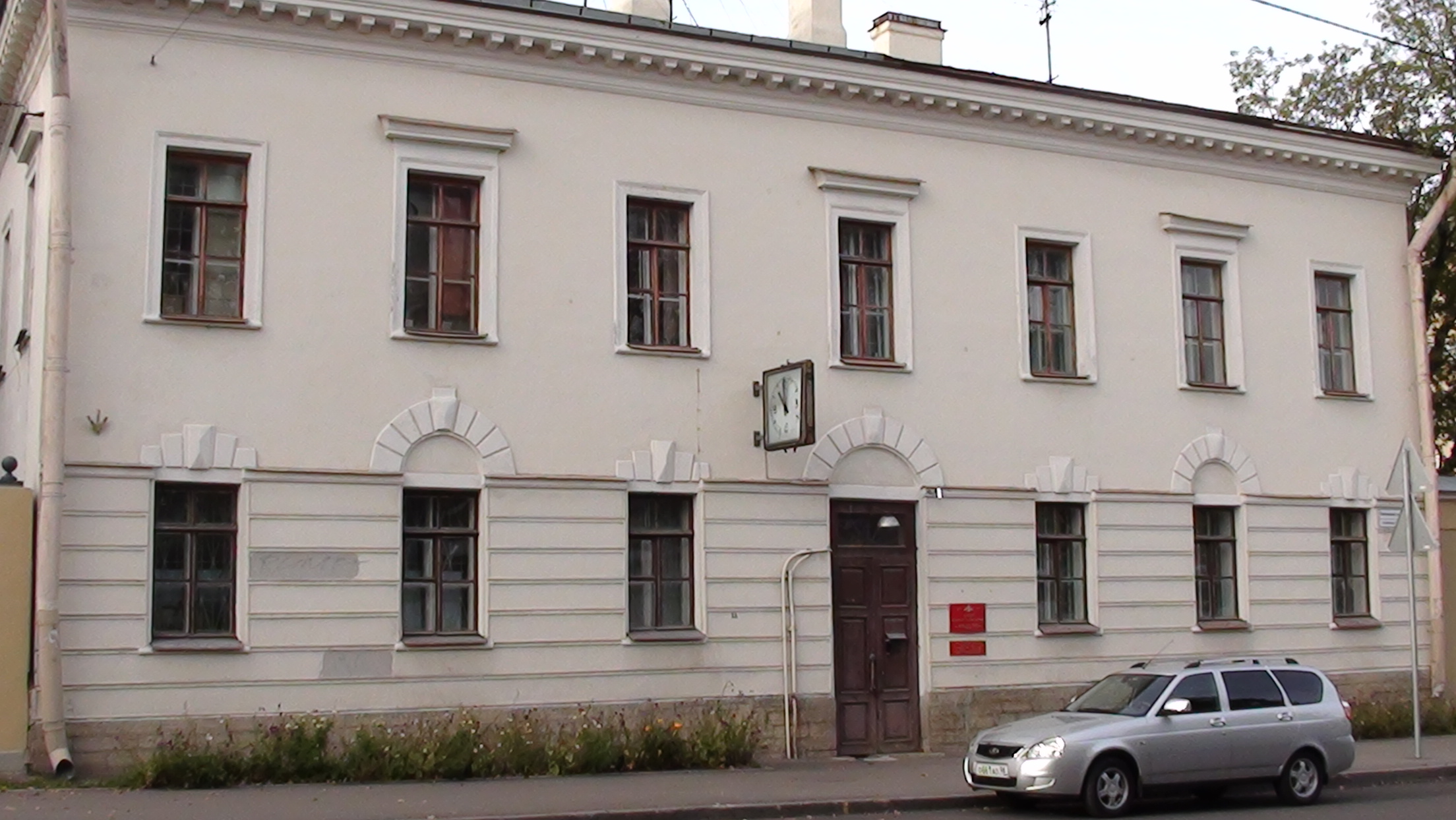
- Interactive map of the Office of the Police Chief area

General information
- Architectural style: Classicism
- Location: Pushkin, 22 Leontyevskaya Street
- Coordinates: 59°43′15″N 30°24′17″E
- Completed: 1821

Design and construction
- Architect: Vasily Stasov
- Other designers: William Heste

The Office of the Police Chief is a building of historical significance in Pushkin, Saint Petersburg. It was built in 1821. In modern times it is seen as an object of cultural heritage. The building is located on 22 Leontjevskaya Street.

== History ==
The building is part of the complex of buildings of the Tsarskoye Selo Police, which forms the western side of the Cathedral Square. A project developed by the architect V. I. Geste and modified in 1819 by Vasily Petrovich Stasov was used. The building was erected in 1821. In the house was the apartment of the police chief, as well as the private police officer. In this house from 1853 to 1861 lived NI Tsylov, compiler of the atlases of Tsarskoe Selo and St. Petersburg. After the October Revolution in the former complex of police buildings, the Detskoye Selo (Pushkin) City Council of Workers ', Peasants' and Red Army Deputies, as well as the executive bodies of the city authorities were located. Now the building of the chief of the police chief is occupied by the department of the regional military commissariat.

== Architecture ==
The architectural style employed by the stone building is classicism. It stands at two stories and is symmetrical to the fire department. The lower floor is rustic and the windows are decorated with castle stones. To the houses on both sides are adjacent stone fences. To the right of the building in the fence there are gates, provided with stone foundations, for passage to the yard.

== Literature ==
- Семенова Г. В. (2009). Царское Село: знакомое и незнакомое. М.: Центрполиграф. pp. 360–362. ISBN 978-5-9524-4249-8.

== Sources ==
- "Леонтьевская 22, 28, 32. Царскосельская Градская полиция". Энциклопедия Царского Села. Archived from the original on 2018-07-15.
- "Управление полицмейстера". citywalls.ru.
