= St. Nicholas Cossack Cathedral =

Oldest church in Omsk, Siberia

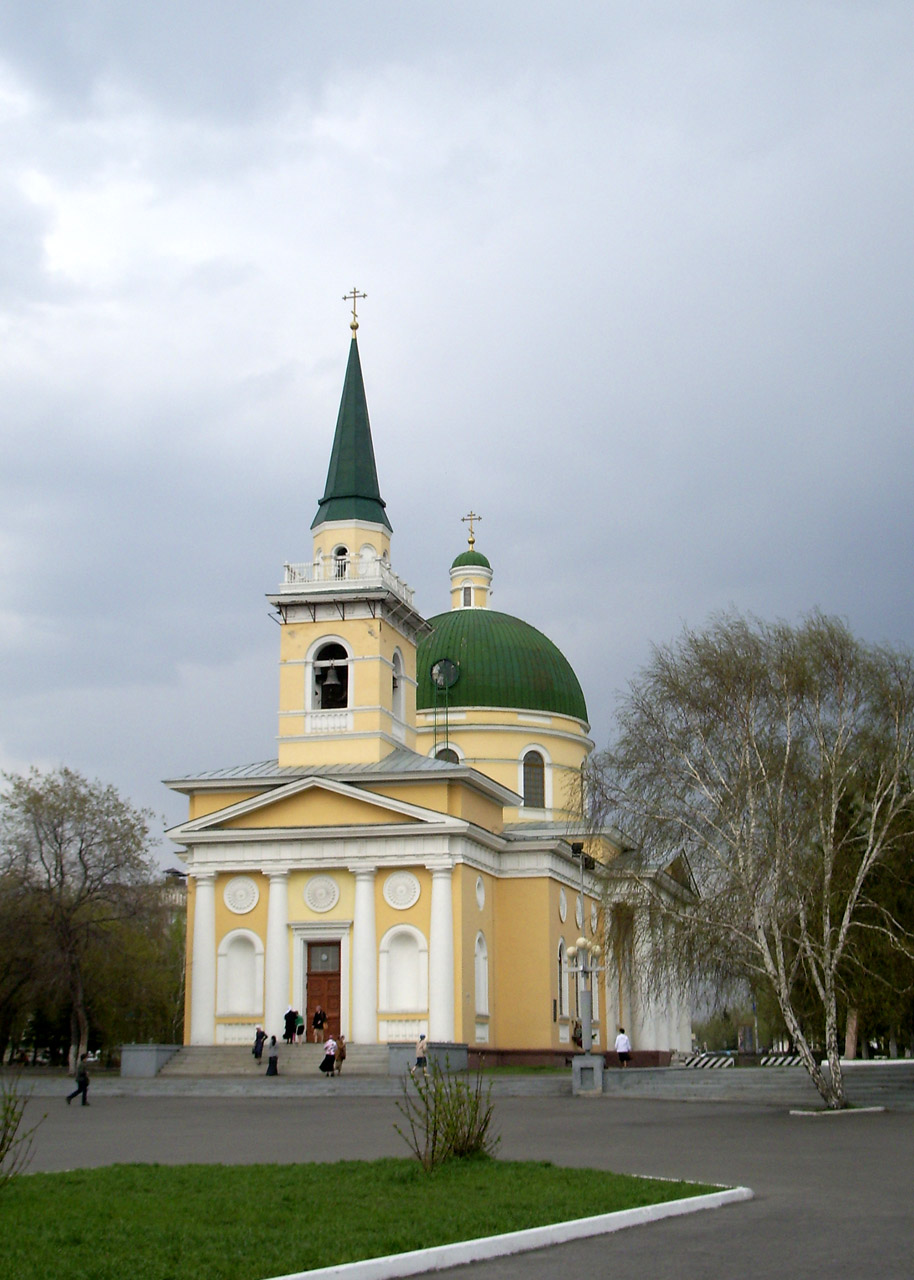
Saint Nicholas Cathedral in Omsk

The St. Nicholas Cossack Cathedral is the oldest church in Omsk, Siberia. It was built in 1843 to Neoclassical designs by Vasily Stasov. For a long time, ministers of the cathedral have kept the banner of Yermak Timofeyevich, the Cossack Ataman who conquered Siberia. In 1929, by order of the communists, a cinema was housed in the building. It was subsequently made into a concert hall. In the early 1990s, divine services resumed in the cathedral.

== History ==
The laying of the foundation stone of the temple took place on May 15, 1833. May 26–27, 1840 Archpriest Dmitry Ponomarev consecrated two thrones of a warm church, in the name of George the Victorious and Simeon the God-receiver and Anna the Prophetess. The main altar was consecrated on September 16, 1843. Donations of Siberian Cossack troops and Omsk citizens formed the financial basis of the construction.

The initial idea was to build the church on the burned-out square of Cossack outer settlement in front of the Cossack military school. However, the governor of Omsk Region General de Saint-Laurent refused because of Russian Emperor's approved plan of Omsk according to which a square supposed to be situated there. A place in an artillery grove was given to the church. Corps commander, I.A. Velyaminov appealed to the Emperor with a petition and the place in front of the school was approved.

The author of the Cathedral original draft was a brilliant architect V.P. Stasov (1769–1848). In 1826 he created the project for St. Petersburg: "The facade and the plan of the expected Church in the name of St. Nicholas". A refectory and a bell tower were not included in the Church figure by Stasov. Working drawings were developed by Colonel A.A. Leshchev and a provincial architect P.I. Praman, who took a typical project from a Churches sample-drawings Album. The height of the dome was increased. The new plan was approved by the Corps Commander Velyaminov and Reverend Athanasius on June 29, 1833.

== Appearance ==
The Cathedral is brick, one-storey, and has a form of a "ship". There is the hemispherical dome on a cylindrical drum with round-headed windows above the centric temple with Doric porticos. The Apse is rectangular. Above the refectory, which has three windows on the north side and three on the south, there is a dual-slope roof. The Cathedral has few cupolas - on the dome, above the altar and on the bell tower. The crosses are eight-pointed. The dome and spire were painted green (and have the same color nowadays) Copper crosses were donated by a rich manufacturer Yakovlev. Crosses were gilded with pure gold at the Upper Iset factory, owned by the donor. The walls are smooth and have pilasters. The cornice is complex. Semicircular windows are decorated with architraves, window-sill space is decorated with balusters. The western facade has the form of a portico with four Dorian half-columns, the entrance is flanked by niches. The dome has a lantern with four windows, completed with a small hemispherical cupola.
