= Trinity Cathedral, Saint Petersburg =

Coordinates: 59°54′59″N 30°18′22″E

Trinity Cathedral
- Собор Святой Живоначальной Троицы лейб-гвардии Измайловского полка
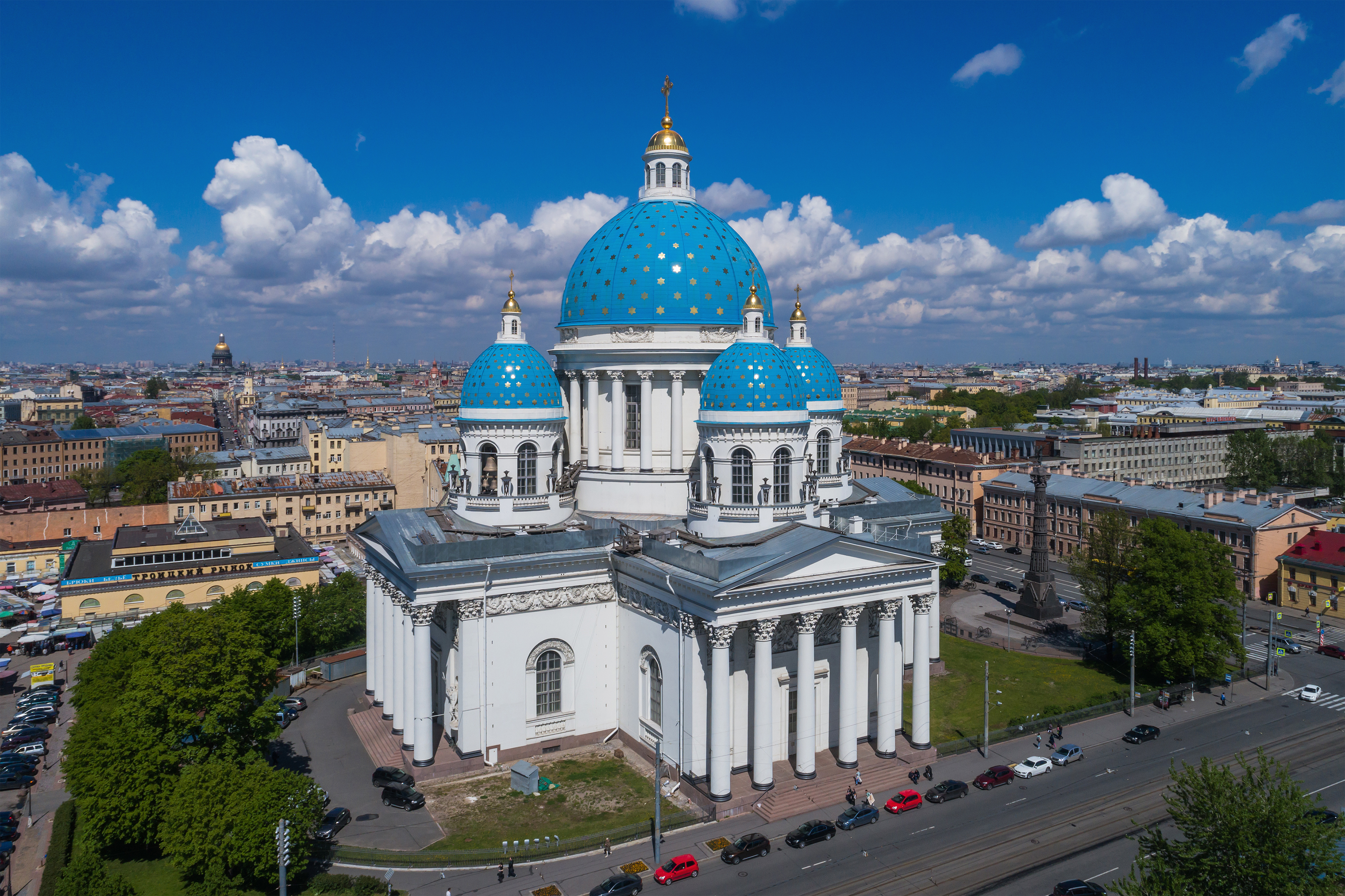
- The cathedral in June 2017
- Trinity Cathedral
- Location: Saint Petersburg
- Country: Russia
- Denomination: Russian Orthodox
- Website: www.izm.orthodoxy.ru

History
- Consecrated: 1835

Architecture
- Architect: Vasily Stasov
- Style: Russian Neoclassical
- Years built: 1828–1835

Specifications
- Capacity: 3,000 worshippers 3,500 square metres (38,000 sq ft) (area)
- Length: 75 metres (246 ft)
- Width: 75 metres (246 ft)
- Height: 80 metres (260 ft) (top cross)

Administration
- Metropolis: Saint Petersburg

The Trinity Cathedral (Russian: Троицкий собор, Troitsky sobor; Russian: Троице-Измайловский соборTroitse-Izmailovsky sobor), sometimes called the Troitsky Cathedral, in Saint Petersburg, Russia, is a formerly Russian Imperial Army Izmaylovskiy regiment Russian Orthodox church, an architectural landmark - a late example of the Empire style, built between 1828 and 1835 to a design by Vasily Stasov. It is located due south of the Admiralty on Izmaylovskiy Prospekt, not far from the Tekhnologichesky Institut Metro station.

The cathedral, which can accommodate up to 3,000 visitors, has only recently begun to be restored to its pre-Revolutionary splendor after years of neglect. In honor of the victory in the Russo-Turkish War, 1877–1878, when the Russians liberated Bulgaria from the Ottoman domination, a memorial column was constructed in front of the northern facade of the cathedral in 1886. The cathedral became a part of the Saint Petersburg World Heritage Site in 1990.

On August 25, 2006, with reconstruction work underway, the main dome of the cathedral collapsed after a fire, as did one of the smaller domes. The cathedral was restored and reopened in 2010.

== History ==
=== Early years ===
According to the Russian tradition, each regiment of the imperial guards had its own cathedral. The Trinity Cathedral was the regimental church of the Izmailovsky regiment of Imperial guards, which takes its name from a royal residence in Izmailovo, near Moscow.

On July 12, 1733, a large field tent operating as a church was consecrated in St. Petersburg, with icons painted on a dark blue satin. However, the church functioned only in the summer; in winter the soldiers and officers had to attend other parish churches. In 1754–1756, a wooden church was built on the site by order of Empress Elizabeth. The church had two altars, the main one of which was consecrated in the name of the Trinity. It suffered severe damage as a result of the flood of 1824 and had to be rebuilt. The commission was given by Emperor Nicholas I to Vasily Stasov.

=== Construction of the present church ===
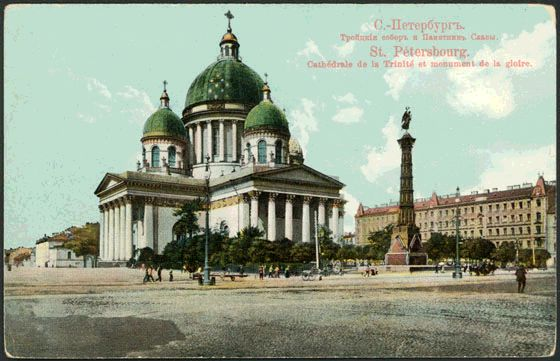
The Trinity Cathedral in St. Petersburg represents a high point of Russian Neoclassicism

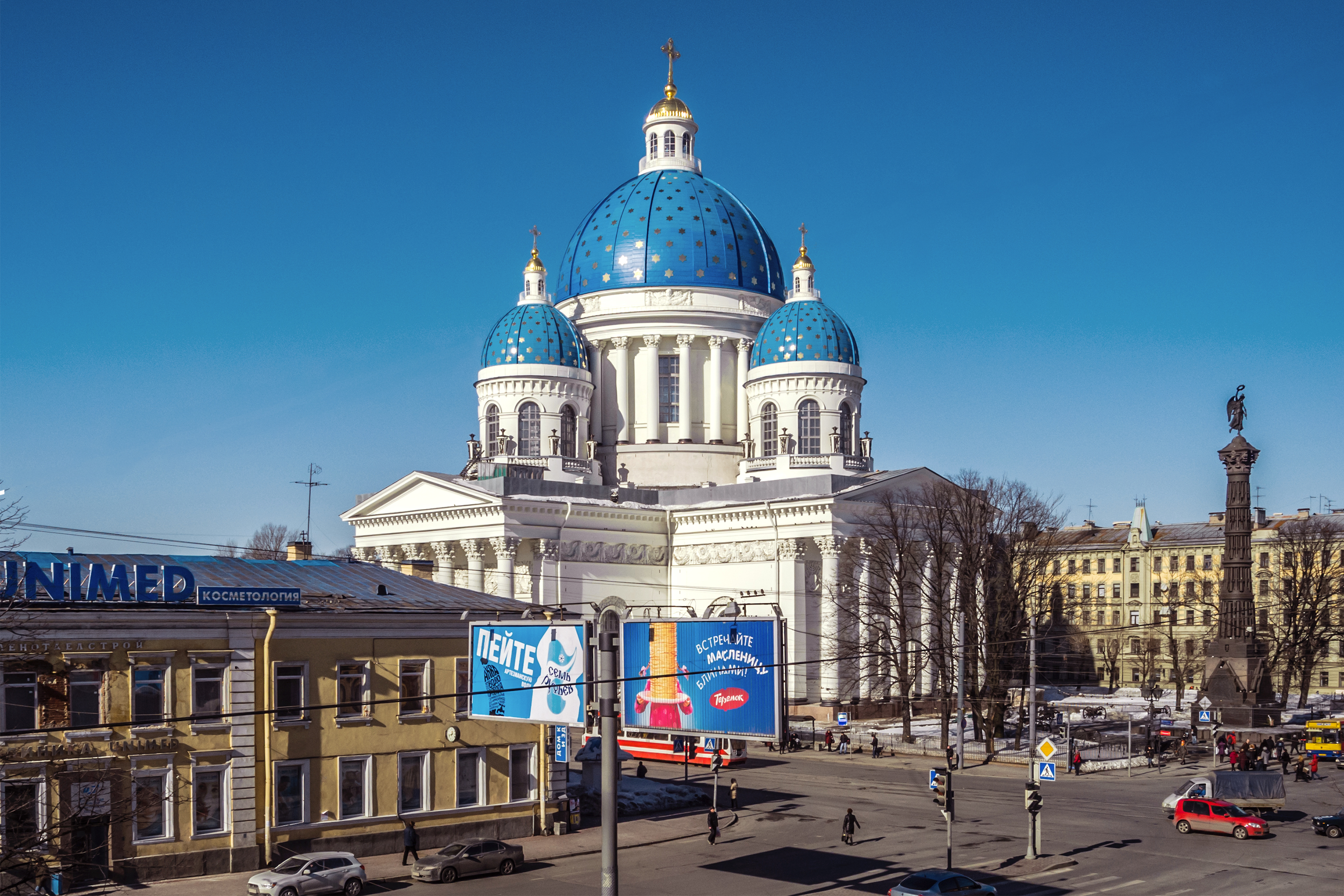
The cathedral with Column of Glory in 2011

Construction of the new church began in May 1828, and the cathedral was consecrated in May 1835. The cathedral rises to a height of more than 80 meters (260 ft), and dominates the skyline of the surrounding area. Memorial plaques to regimental officers killed in battle were mounted on the cathedral's wall. After the cathedral's opening, flags, keys from forts and other trophies that the regiment won in campaigns in 1854–1855 and 1877–1878 were also housed in the cathedral.

The Trinity Cathedral was renowned for its collection of icons. The main section of the cathedral housed the Nativity icon, while the southern section housed the Jesus Christ icon. Empress Elizabeth presented the church with the 'Beginning of Life' Trinity icon in 1742. Other holy objects housed in the cathedral included a large ark made in the form of a silver cross in 1753, a large silver cross presented to the cathedral by Nicholas I in 1835, and two large Gospels in valuable bindings.

The noted writer Fyodor Dostoevsky was 45 years old when he married Anna Snitkina here on 15 February 1867.

=== Post-Revolution ===
In 1922, during the Russian Revolution, most of the cathedral's valuables were looted. The thievery continued for several more years until the cathedral was finally closed in 1938. There were rumors of plans by the Soviet government to demolish the cathedral and use the remaining material for a district workers' theatre. However, the cathedral was transferred to the Soviet Ministry of Telecommunications, for which it became a warehouse. Only in 1990, after the breakup of the Soviet Union, did the cathedral return to the hands of the Russian Orthodox Church. They began to restore it. By that time, the interior was largely bare, stripped of the splendor and majesty of its pre-Revolutionary period.

=== 2006 fire ===
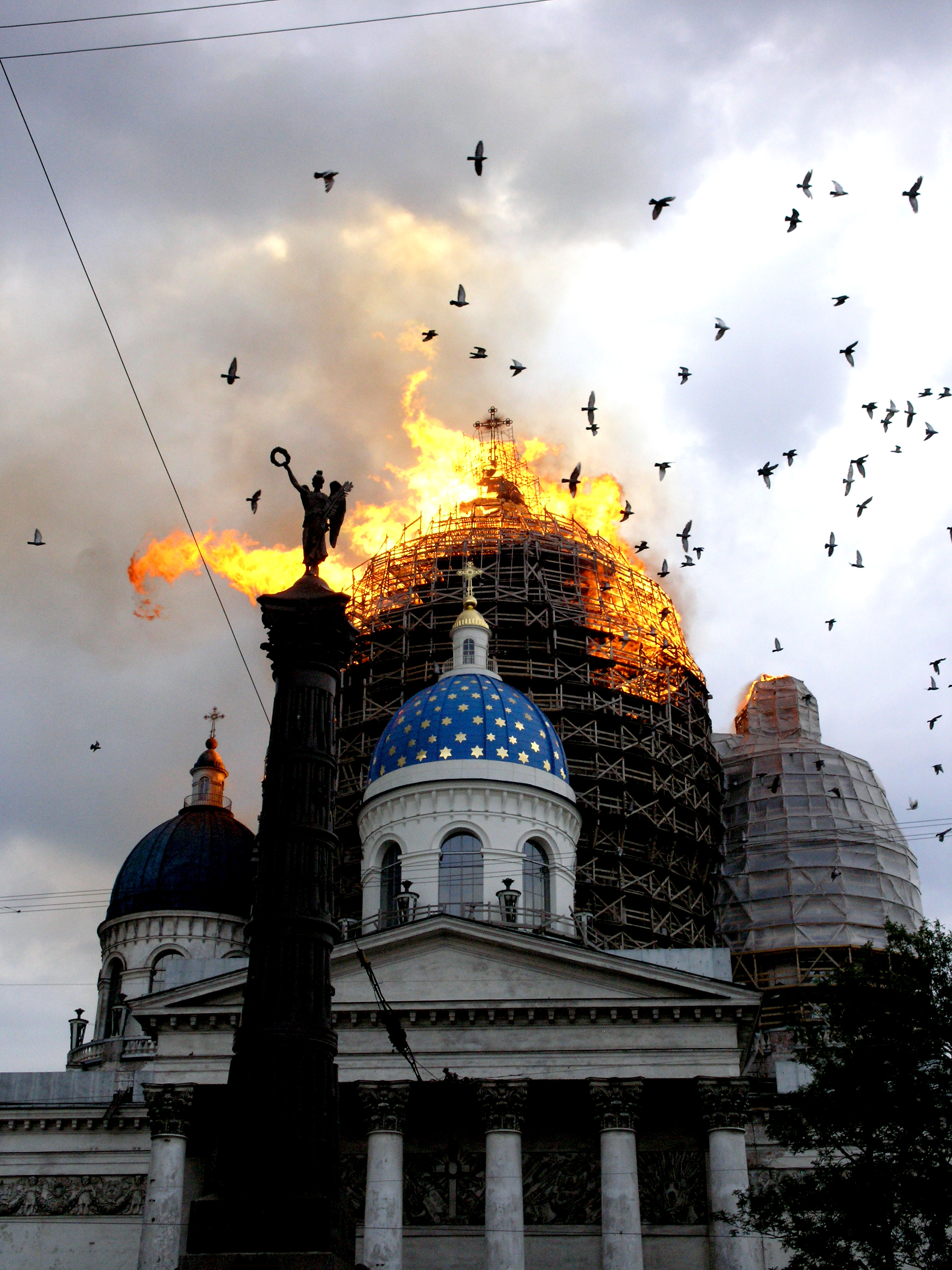

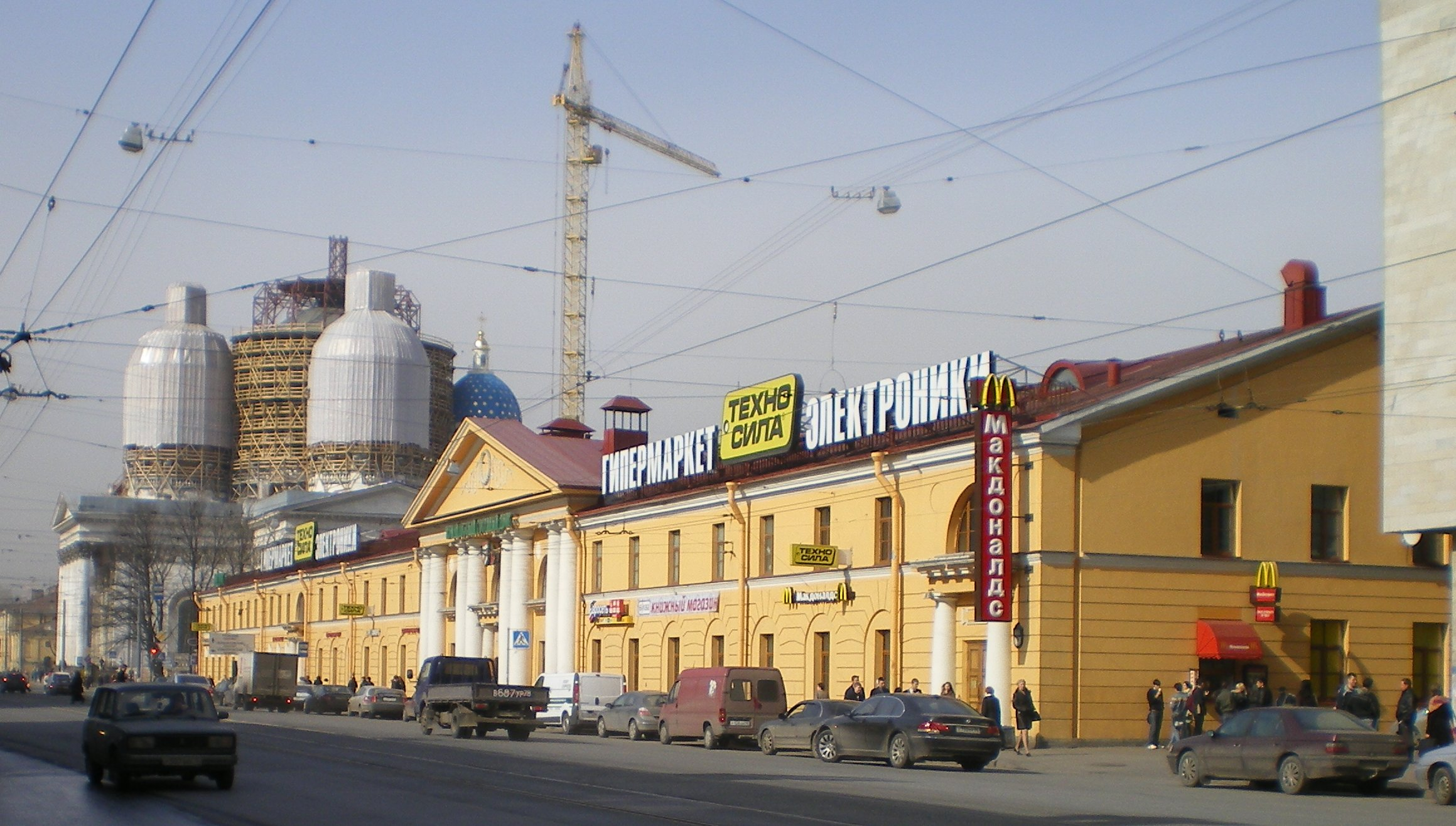
Restoration works in April 2008

On August 24, 2006, while the cathedral was under reconstruction, a fire originating on restorers' scaffolding resulted in the collapse of the main dome, destroyed one of the four smaller domes, and severely damaged the interior. The fire burned through scaffolding outside the central dome of the cathedral. There were no reports of injuries.

Firefighters battled to save the other three cupolas as emergency workers removed icons and other religious articles. A helicopter dumped water on the historic structure. About four hours after the blaze broke out, one of the three remaining cupolas had been damaged but the fire was contained.

The blaze apparently started on scaffolding on the outside of the church, which was undergoing restoration. The most valuable icons and other items were saved, and structural damage beneath the roof area was minor.

Fire officials later tried hard to play down the damage. The St. Petersburg emergency directorate refuted earlier media reports that claimed that at least two domes of the cathedral had been destroyed. Governor Valentina Matviyenko pledged to restore the cathedral within the shortest time possible, pledging to allocate 30 million rubles ($1.12 million) that year on preparations to rebuild the cathedral. Restoration was completed, and the cathedral reopened in 2010.

== See also ==
- Another Trinity Cathedral in the Alexander Nevsky Monastery complex
- Helsinki Cathedral
