= International Union of Revolutionary Writers =

Union of socialist and communist literary artists sponsored by the Comintern

International Union of Revolutionary Writers (Russian: Международное объединение революционных писателей; МОРП) was a union of writers' organizations established by the Soviet Union in the 1920s and played an active role on the world stage in the 1930s. As an international organization to promote Proletarian literature, it was established as the International Bureau of Proletkult in 1920. From November 6 to 15, the organization was formally established in Kharkiv. Its official organ was International Literature. It has multiple branches around the world. The organization was disbanded in 1935 following the First International Congress of Writers for the Defence of Culture.

== Branches ==
- Union of Soviet Writers (in Soviet Union)
- Association des Écrivains et Artistes Révolutionnaires (in France)
- Association of Proletarian-Revolutionary Authors (in Germany)
- League of Left-Wing Writers (in China)
- John Reed Clubs (in U.S.)
