= Column of Glory =

War memorial in Saint Petersburg, Russia

- Колонна Славы (Kolonna Slavy)
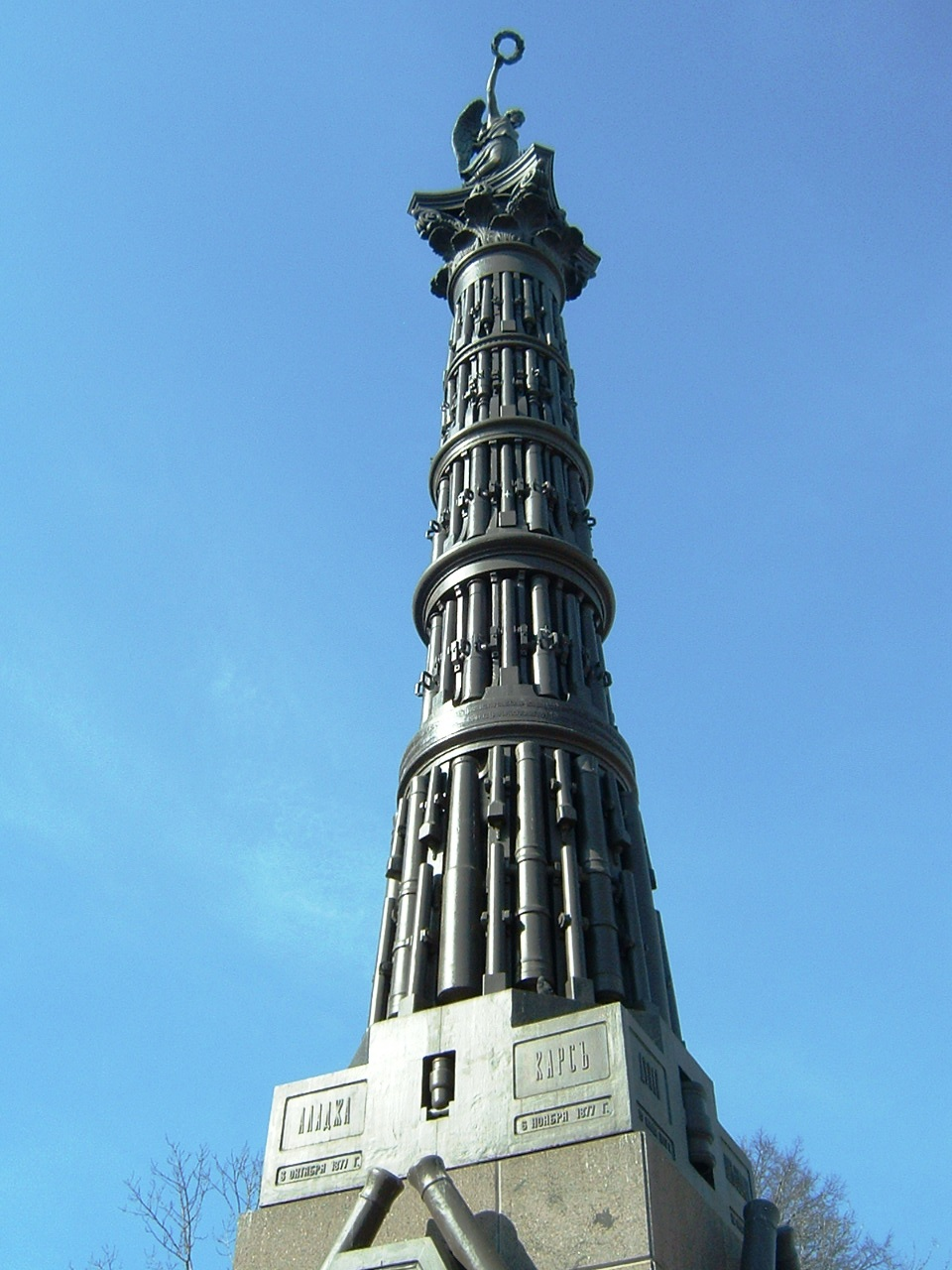
- Russo-Turkish War memorial column
- Interactive map of Column of Glory
- Location: Trinity Cathedral, Saint Petersburg, Russia
- Coordinates: 59°54′59″N 30°18′26″E
- Type: Victory Memorial
- Material: Trophy cannon barrels
- Height: Eight meters
- Beginning date: 1886 (original), 2004 (replica)
- Completion date: 1886 (original), 2004 (replica)
- Dedicated to: Victory in the Russo-Turkish War, 1877-1878
- Dismantled date: 1929

The Column of Glory (Russian: Колонна Славы, Kolonna Slavy), sometimes called the Russo-Turkish War Memorial column, is a victory memorial situated in the immediate surroundings of the Trinity Cathedral in Saint Petersburg, Russia. Completed in 2004 as a gift at the 300th anniversary of the city in 2003, the monument is an exact replica of a monument from 1886 that was destroyed by Soviet leader Joseph Stalin in 1929.

== History ==
In honor of the victory in the Russo-Turkish War, 1877-1878, when the Russians liberated Bulgaria from a Turkish invasion, a memorial column was constructed in 1886 in front of the northern facade of the Trinity Cathedral. Its foundation was 140 trophy cannon barrels used to beat back the Turks during the liberation of Bulgaria. The monument stood eight meters high, and was crowned with the winged figure of victory with a wreath made of oak leaves in one hand and palm branches in the other. An iron spiral staircase was located inside. Ten cannons surrounded the outside of the monument. In 1929, the monument was dismantled and sold by the Soviet Government to Germany for cash.

In 2004 the monument was restored using the original blueprints of the project. The foundation of the column is built out of exact replicas of 128 Turkish cannons cast by the Novolipetsk Steel company. The cannons and other metal parts of the column were given to Saint Petersburg as a gift to its 300th anniversary.
