= International Literature =

Moscow-based literary magazine (1933–1943)

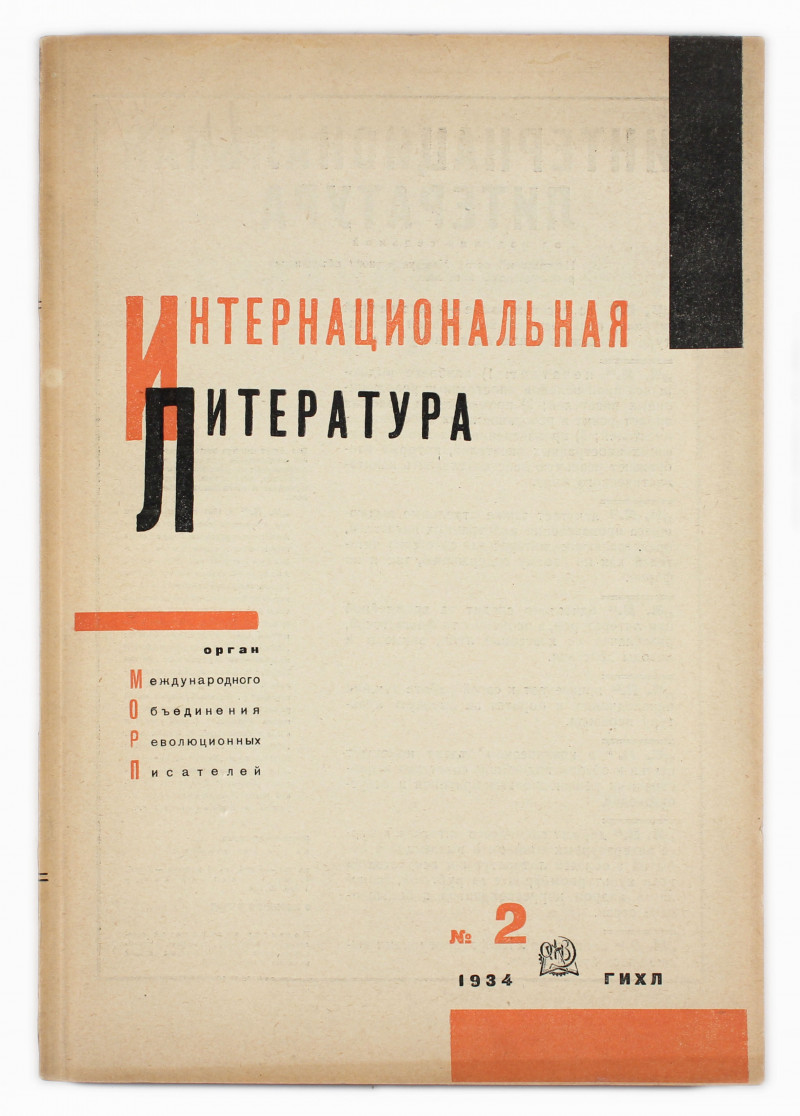
- A 1934 issue in Russian language
- Frequency: Monthly
- Publisher: Lawrence & Wishart (Britain)
- First issue: 1933
- Final issue: 1943
- Based in: Moscow
- Language: Multilingual

International Literature (Russian: Интернациональная литература, romanized: Internatsionalnaya literatura) was a monthly multi-language literary and political magazine published in the Soviet Union from 1933 to 1943. The magazine was based in Moscow. It was published by the International Union of Revolutionary Writers (or the International Association of Revolutionary Writers) until December 1935, when the Union of Soviet Writers took over.

The magazine was published in several European languages and distributed by the publishers associated with the Comintern: for example, it was printed by Lawrence & Wishart in Great Britain under the title International Literature. The magazine contained literary criticism of both Soviet and foreign literature, a chronicle of the international literary world, and the works of the "approved" authors, such as Romain Rolland, Ernest Hemingway, Richard Wright, Heinrich Mann, Lion Feuchtwanger, William Saroyan, André Maurois, Luigi Pirandello. George Orwell had a correspondence with Sergei Dinamov, the editor: Dinamov asked Orwell to send a copy of The Road to Wigan Pier so the work could be published in the magazine; Orwell sent him a copy, but warned that he had been serving in the militia of the POUM. Dinamov replied that the works of the members of POUM could not be published, but it didn't save him from being purged in 1938.

Internatsionalnaya Literatura was created as a result of the merge between the magazines The Bulletin of Foreign Literature (Russian: Вестник иностранной литературы, romanized: Vestnik inostrannoj literatury), published in 1928 and 1929–1930, and The World Revolution Literature (Russian: Литература мировой революции, romanized: Literatura mirovoj revoljutsii), published in 1931–1932. It was shut down 1943 to be restarted in 1955 as Inostrannaya Literatura.

== Editors ==
- Bruno Jasieński (1933–1937)
- Sergey Dinamov (?–1938)
- Timofey Rokotov (1938)
- Elena Stasova (1938–1946)
