= Stašek =

Stašek (feminine: Stašková) is a Czech-language surname. Notable people with the surname include:

- Andrea Stašková
- Antal Stašek
- Martin Stašek
- Miloslav Stašek

== See also ==
- Staš
