= Alexander Engelhardt (scientist) =

Russian military officer (1832–1893)

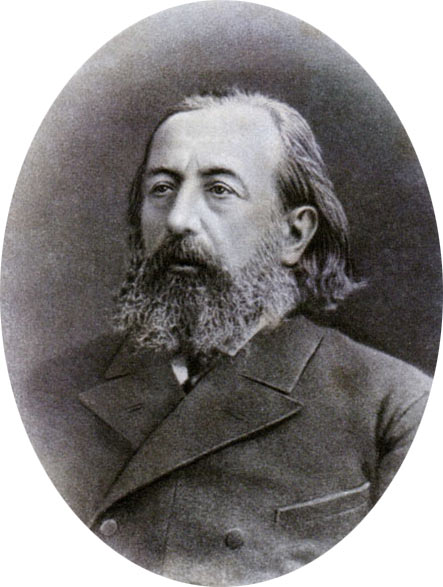
Alexander Nikolayevich Engelhardt

Alexander Nikolayevich Engelhardt (Russian: Алекса́ндр Никола́евич Энгельга́рдт; 2 August [O.S. 21 July] 1832 – 2 February [O.S. 21 January] 1893) was a Russian military officer, agricultural scientist and publicist of Narodnik orientation.

== Biography ==
A member of the noble Engelhardt family, he became widely known for his social and agronomic activities and his experiment in organising rational farming on his own estate in Batishchevo, in Smolensk Governorate.

In 1859 in Saint Petersburg, Engelhardt married Anna Nikolaevna Makarova and the couple had three children, who would later become writers. In 1870, he and his wife were both arrested for participation in the socialist students' circle of the Saint Petersburg Agricultural Institute (Russian: Санкт-Петербургский земледельческий институ), where he worked. After a month and a half, his wife was released, as there was insufficient evidence of her involvement, but Engelhardt spent eighteen months in prison and was then exiled for life from Saint Petersburg and banished to his estate near Batishchevo in the Smolensk Oblast. His wife periodically visited him there, but she maintained a separate household in Saint Petersburg with the children.

== Sources ==
- "Энгельгардт, Александр Николаевич" . Brockhaus and Efron Encyclopedic Dictionary (in Russian). 1906.
