= Bruno Jasieński =

Polish poet and activist (1901–1938)

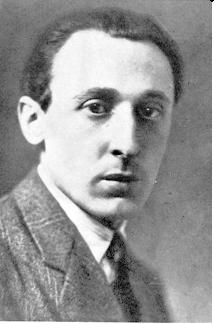
- Bruno Jasieński
- Born: Wiktor Zysman; 17 July 1901; Klimontów, Congress Poland
- Died: 17 September 1938 (aged 37); Kommunarka shooting ground, Moscow, Soviet Union
- Occupation: Poet
- Writing career
- Language: Polish
- Notable works: But w butonierce ('A Boot in the Boutonniere'); Pieśń o głodzie ('Song of Hunger') ”Palę Paryż” (‘I Burn Paris’)

Bruno Jasieński (Polish: [ˈbrunɔ jaˈɕeɲskʲi]; born Victor Bruno Sysmann; Polish: Wiktor Bruno Zysman; Russian: Зисман, Виктор Яковлевич; 17 July 1901 – 17 September 1938) was a Polish poet, novelist, playwright, Catastrophist, and leader of the Polish Futurist movement in the interwar period. Jasieński was also a communist activist in Poland, France and the Soviet Union, where he was executed during the Great Purge. He is acclaimed by members of the various modernist art groups as their patron. An annual literary festival Brunonalia is held in Klimontów, Poland, his birthplace, where one of the streets is also named after him.

== Early life ==
Wiktor Bruno Zysman was born at Klimontów, Congress Poland, to the family of Jakub Zysman, who was of Jewish origin. Wiktor's mother, Eufemia Maria (née Modzelewska), came from a Catholic Polish szlachta (nobility) family. Jakub Zysman was a prominent local doctor and social worker, active in Klimontów intelligentsia. Zysman converted to Lutheranism to be able to marry Eufemia Maria. They had three children: Wiktor Bruno, Jerzy, and Irena.

Jasieński attended a gymnasium secondary school in Warsaw. In 1914, as World War I raged on, his family relocated to Russia proper, where in 1918 he graduated from a secondary school in Moscow. There, his fascination with Igor Severyanin's Ego-Futurism started, followed by readings of Velimir Chlebnikov, Vladimir Mayakovsky and Alexiey Kruchonykh's so-called Visual poems.

== Literary career and political activism ==
=== In Poland ===
In 1918, Jasieński arrived in Kraków, where he attended courses in Polish literature, law and philosophy at the Jagiellonian University and became active in the avant-garde circles. In 1919, he became one of the founders of a club of Futurists named Katarynka (Barrel Organ), to suggest identification with the common people and anti-elitism of its members. His pursuits included literary productions and social activities in Kraków, Warsaw, and elsewhere in Poland. Among his collaborators were Stanisław Młodożeniec, Tytus Czyżewski, Anatol Stern and Aleksander Wat.

In 1921, Jasieński published one of his first Futurist works, Nuż w bżuhu ('Knife in the Stomach', with intentional misspellings in the title) and, together with Młodożeniec, became known as one of the founders of the Polish Futurist movement. The same year he published a number of other works, including manifestos, leaflets, posters and various kinds of new art, formerly unknown in Poland. A volume of his poems entitled But w butonierce ('A Boot in the Boutonniere') was published in Warsaw.

He gained much fame as an enfant terrible of Polish literature and was well received by critics in many Polish cities, including Warsaw and Lwów, where he met Marian Hemar. Jasieński collaborated with various newspapers, such as the leftist Trybuna Robotnicza, Nowa Kultura and Zwrotnica. In 1922, Pieśń o głodzie ('Song of Hunger') was published, followed in 1924 by Ziemia na lewo ('Earth Leftwards', written together with Stern). In 1923, he married Klara Arem, daughter of a merchant from Lwów.

That year, Jasieński witnessed a workers' rebellion in Kraków, which prompted him to join the Polish communist movement. He gave public lectures on Marxist philosophy and revolutionary strategies for class struggle.

=== In France ===
Persecuted by the police, Jasieński and his wife moved to France in 1925; they settled in Paris in Passage Poissonniere. The couple lived a humble life, making ends meet as journalists and correspondents of various Polish newspapers. Jasieński, together with Zygmunt Modzelewski, formed an amateur theatre for the Polish worker diaspora living in Saint-Denis. He wrote numerous poems, essays and books, many of which expressed his radical views. Jasieński became an active member of the French Communist Party. He pursued library research on the 1846 peasant uprising of Jakub Szela in the Austrian Partition of Poland and on Polish folklore. He wrote the poem Słowo o Jakubie Szeli ('A note on Jakub Szela').

In 1928, he serialised the work which secured his reputation, Palę Paryż ('I burn Paris'), a Futurist-Catastrophist novel depicting the collapse and decay of the city and social tensions within capitalist societies. It was published in the leftist L'Humanité newspaper in French as Je brûle Paris, which was soon translated into Russian. In 1929, the original Polish text was published in Warsaw. The novel was also a humorous reply to Paul Morand's pamphlet I Burn Moscow, published shortly before. It gained Jasieński much fame in France, but also became the main reason why in 1929 he was deported from the country, ostensibly for disseminating dangerous political propaganda. Not admitted to Belgium and Luxembourg, he moved to Germany and stayed in Frankfurt for a while. After the withdrawal of the extradition order, he returned to France, only to be expelled once more.

=== In the Soviet Union ===
In 1929, Jasieński moved to the Soviet Union and settled in Leningrad, where he accepted Soviet citizenship and was promoted by the authorities. The first Russian edition of I Burn Paris was issued in 130,000 copies and sold out in one day. The same year his son was born and Jasieński became editor-in-chief of Kultura mass ('Culture of the Masses'), a Polish language monthly, and a journalist for the Soviet Tribune. He divorced Klara and married Anna Berzin, with whom he had a daughter. Jasieński began to write in Russian; he produced a play (1931), a novel, and collections of stories.

In 1932, he transferred from the Polish division of the French Communist Party to the All-Union Communist Party (Bolsheviks) and soon became a prominent member of that organisation. He relocated to Moscow. He served in various posts in literary departments of the communist party and at the Union of Soviet Writers. He was granted honorary citizenship of Tajikistan. By the mid-1930s, he became a strong supporter of Genrikh Yagoda's political purges within the writers' community; according to Wat, Jasieński was active in the campaign against Isaac Babel. From 1933 to 1937, he worked on the editorial staff of the multilingual magazine Internatsionalnaya Literatura ('International Literature'). However, in 1937 Yagoda himself was arrested and Jasieński lost a powerful protector. Soon afterwards, Jasieński's former wife, Klara, allegedly involved in an affair with Yagoda, was also arrested, sentenced to death and executed. Jasieński was expelled from the party, and he too was caught up in the purges. Sentenced to death by the Military Collegium of the Supreme Court of the USSR on charge of participation in a counter-revolutionary terrorist organisation on 17 September 1938 and executed the same day in Kommunarka shooting ground near Moscow, as finally established in 1992.

He was rehabilitated in 1955.

== Family ==
Jasieński's second wife, Anna, was arrested in 1939 and was imprisoned in Soviet gulags for seventeen years. His underage son was sent to an orphanage to be brought up with no knowledge of his or his family's past. He escaped during World War II. After the war, he became prominent in Russia's criminal underworld. Having eventually discovered his true origins, he adopted a Polish name and became active in dissident organisations opposing the communist regime. He was killed in the 1970s.

== See also ==
- Polish Operation of the NKVD
- Tomasz Dąbal
