= Dmitry Tolstoy =

Russian politician (1823–1889)

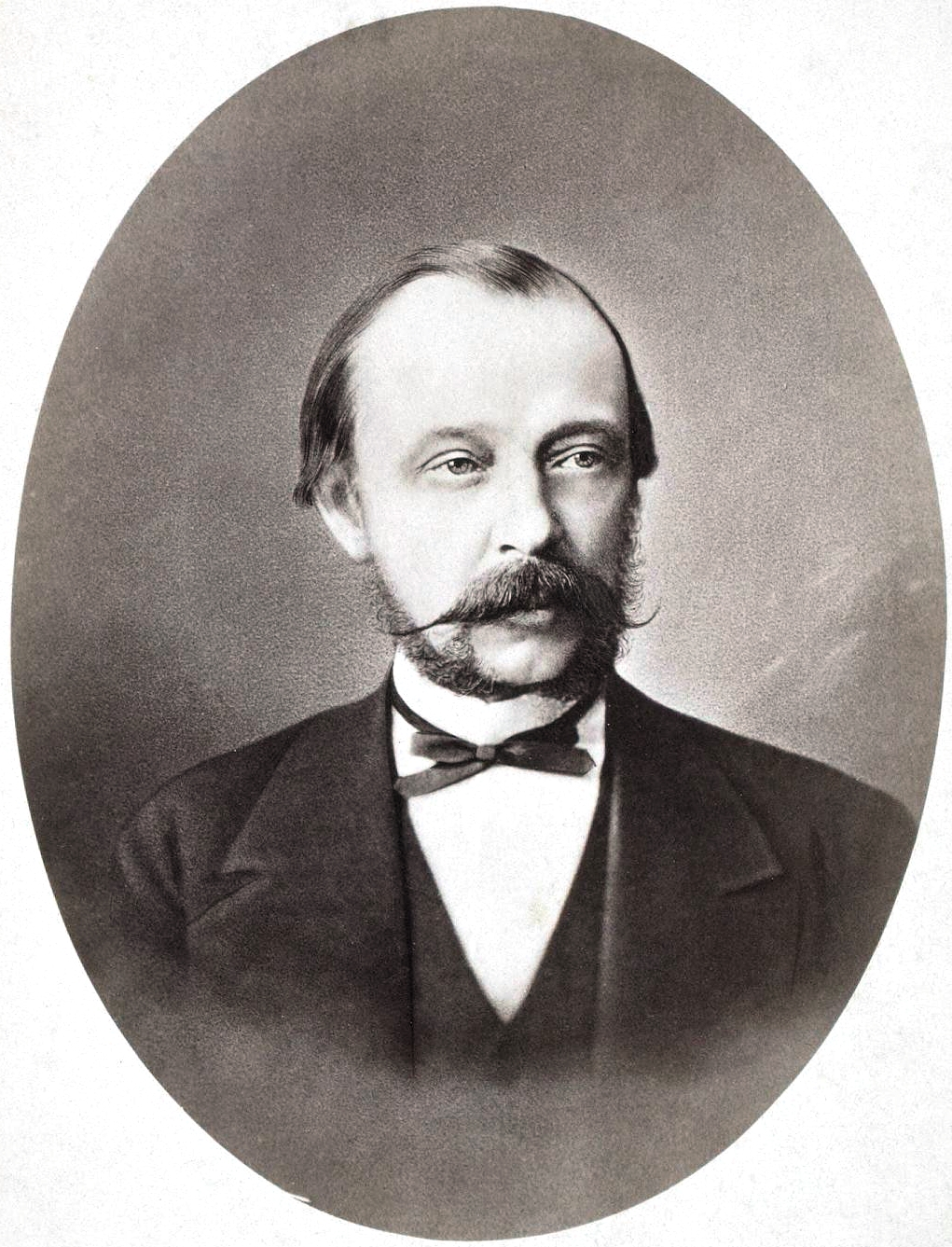
Tolstoy in 1887

Count Dmitry Andreyevich Tolstoy (Russian: Дми́трий Андре́евич Толсто́й; 13 March [O.S. 1 March] 1823, Moscow – 7 May [O.S. 25 April] 1889, Saint Petersburg) was a Russian politician and a member of the State Council of Imperial Russia (1866). He belonged to the comital branch of the Tolstoy family.

== Career ==
Tolstoy graduated from the Tsarskoye Selo Lyceum in 1843. He held a managing position at the Ministry of the Navy beginning in 1853. Tolstoy was an Over-Procurator of the Holy Synod in 1865–1880, simultaneously holding a post of the Minister of National Enlightenment in 1866–1880.

In 1882–1889, Tolstoy was the interior minister and Chief of Gendarmerie. He is considered one of the pillars of the political reaction in the 1880s and supporter of the strong authority. Tolstoy's activities were aimed at backing the nobility, regulating peasantry's modus vivendi, and spreading his administration's influence over local authorities. On Tolstoy's initiative, they issued the so-called "Temporary regulations" in 1882, which limited the freedom of press to an even greater extent. Tolstoy, together with A. Pazukhin, outlined and prepared the so-called "counterreforms", which would become very unpopular in Russia. As one of the great counter reformers of the post Crimean period Tolstoy used his position as minister of education to promote study at university and secondary levels that would bolster Russia as a nation with honest people in power looking to maintain Orthodoxy and Autocracy: something in danger during Tolstoy's rule as the post Crimean period of reform amounted also to increasing rebellion and student dissent. Tolstoy did his best to educate a Russia, and moreover a Russian elite that would maintain Orthodoxy and Autocracy while being in mountable competition with the West. His focus was on consolidating his power over education while suppressing revolutionary attitudes by just censorship, etc.

Tolstoy was elected president of the St. Petersburg Academy of Sciences in 1882. He wrote a number of books on Russian history.

=== Higher education ===
In 1871, Tolstoy was in charge of the college reform, which would result in the prevalence of the classical education (included Latin and Greek languages and ancient literature, among other things).

Feminist activists Maria Trubnikova, Nadezhda Stasova, and Anna Filosofova began pushing, in 1867, for Russian universities to create courses for women. Demonstrating "considerable skill in rallying popular support", according to the historian Christine Johanson, the women wrote a carefully-worded petition to Tsar Alexander II. They gathered over 400 signatures among middle and upper-class women. However, there was widespread opposition to the education of women, particularly by Tolstoy. Tolstoy argued that women would abandon education after being married, and dismissed the signatories by stating that they were "sheep" merely following the latest fashion. He rejected the petition in late 1868, but allowed mixed-gender public lectures which women could attend, under pressure from the Tsar (then Alexander II). However, these were rapidly taken up, overwhelmingly by women.

The feminist trio also appealed to war minister Dmitry Milyutin, who agreed to host the courses after being persuaded by his wife, daughter, and Filosofova. Tolstoy countered by allowing the lectures at his own apartments, where he could monitor them. The political movement in favor of women's education continued to grow, and by October 1869, the Russian government permitted a limited set of courses for women on advanced subjects (including "chemistry, history, anatomy, zoology, and Russian literature"). Stasova organized these and recruited the professors to teach them; the courses began in January 1870. Attended by over 200 women, they became known as the Vladimirskii courses, after their host beginning in 1872, the Vladimir college.

== Sources ==
- "Толстой, Дмитрий Андреевич" . Brockhaus and Efron Encyclopedic Dictionary (in Russian). 1906.

Political offices
Preceded by Alexander Vasilyevich Golovnin	Minister of National Enlightenment; 1866–1880	Succeeded by Andrey Saburov
Preceded by Nikolay Pavlovich Ignatyev	Minister of Interior; 1882–1889	Succeeded by Ivan Durnovo
Academic offices
Preceded by Fyodor Petrovich Litke	President of the Russian Academy of Sciences; 1882–1889	Succeeded by Grand Duke Konstantin Konstantinovich
