= Stasov, Astrakhan Oblast =

Stasov Стасов
- Khutor
- Location within Astrakhan Oblast Location within Russia
- Coordinates: 48°35′N 45°37′E
- Country: Russia
- Region: Astrakhan Oblast
- District: Akhtubinsky District
- Time zone: UTC+4:00

Stasov (Russian: Стасов) is a rural locality (a khutor) in Kapustinoyarsky Selsoviet of Akhtubinsky District, Astrakhan Oblast, Russia. The population was 106 as of 2010. There is 1 street.

== Geography ==
Stasov is located 58 km northwest of Akhtubinsk (the district's administrative centre) by road. Tokarev is the nearest rural locality.
