= Nadezhda Stasova =

Russian educator and feminist (1822–1895)

- Надежда Стасова
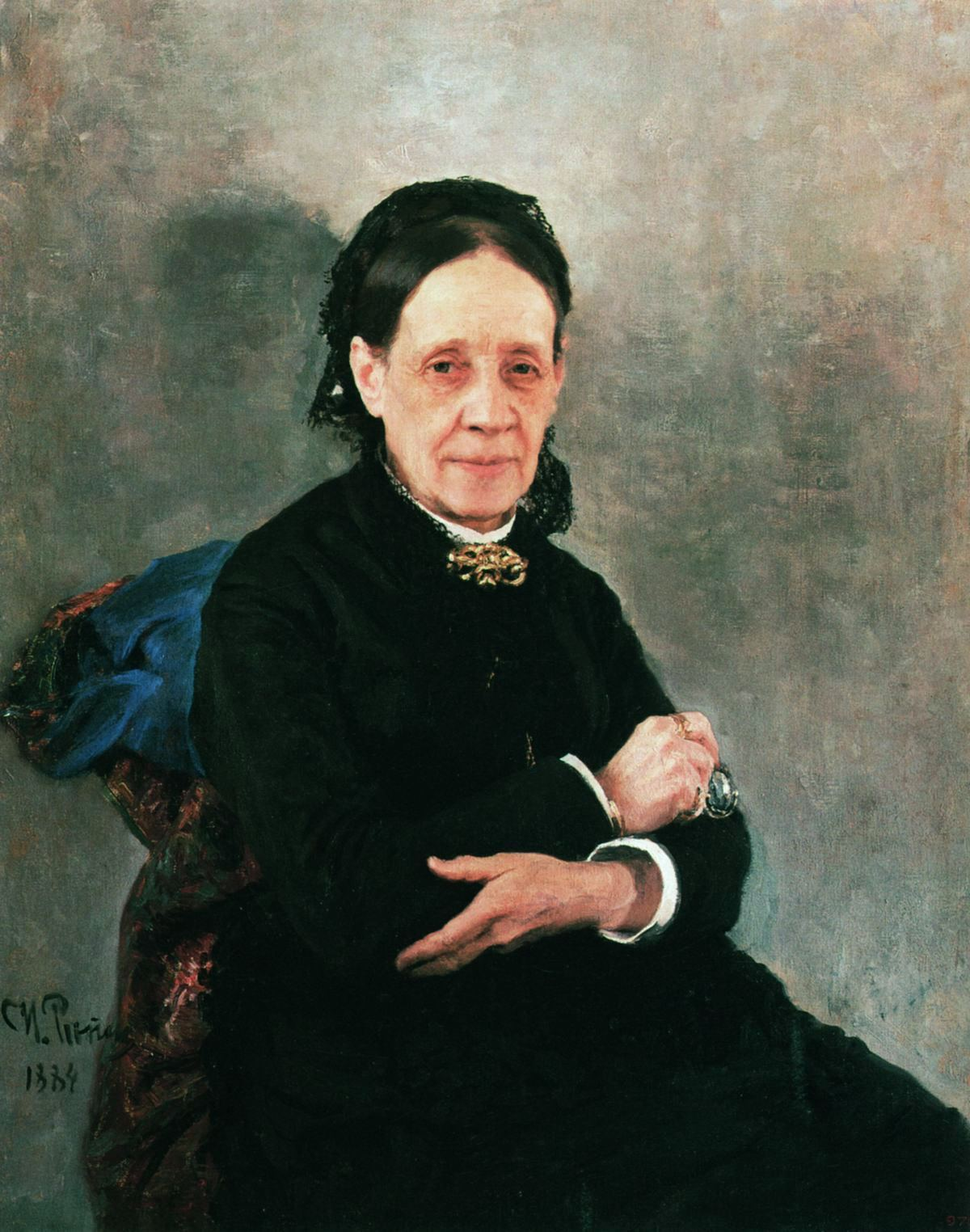
- 1889 portrait
- Born: June 12, 1822; Tsarskoye Selo, Russia
- Died: September 27, 1895 (aged 73); Saint Petersburg, Russia
- Resting place: Tikhvin Cemetery, Saint Petersburg
- Occupations: Activist; philanthropist
- Movement: Feminism in Russia
- Father: Vasily Stasov
- Relatives: Vladimir Stasov (brother); Dmitry Stasov (brother); Elena Stasova (niece)

Nadezhda Vasilievna Stasova (Note: In this name that follows East Slavic naming customs, the patronymic is Vasilievna and the family name is Stasova.) (Russian: Надежда Васильевна Стасова; June 24 [O.S. June 12] 1822 – October 9 [O.S. September 27] 1895) was a Russian educator, activist, and feminist of the 19th century.

Stasova was born into a noble and wealthy family; Tsar Alexander I of Russia was her godfather, and she received extensive private tutoring as a child. After experiencing family tragedy and personal disappointment as a young woman, she dedicated herself to women's education and economic empowerment. Alongside Anna Filosofova and Maria Trubnikova, Stasova was one of the earliest leaders of the Russian women's movement. Together, the three friends and allies were referred to as the "triumvirate".

The triumvirate founded and led several organizations designed to promote women's cultural and economic independence, including a publishing cooperative. Subsequently, the triumvirate pushed government officials to allow higher education for women, although continuing opposition meant that their successes were sometimes limited or reversed. Stasova eventually became the lead organizer of the Bestuzhev Courses in 1878, but a decade later was forced to resign under political pressure. In her final years, she continued her support for the cause of women's rights in Russia. Stasova died in 1895.

== Early life ==
Stasova was born at Tsarskoye Selo, an imperial retreat near Saint Petersburg, on June 24 [O.S. June 12] 1822. Her parents were members of the Russian nobility. Her father, Vasily Petrovich Stasov, was a prominent architect, while her mother, Mariia Abramovna Suchkova, was from a military family. Tsar Alexander I of Russia was Stasova's godfather. Stasova, a middle child, had at least five brothers (including Vladimir and Dmitry) and a sister, Sofya. (Note: Different sources alternately state that there were either 7 or 8 children in the family, and that Stasova was either fourth or fifth in birth order.) One of her nieces, Elena, became a well-known revolutionary and Bolshevik official.

Stasova's mother died in 1831 of cholera, when Stasova was nine years old. As a girl, Stasova was privately tutored by professors hired by her family and studied foreign languages, music, art, and etiquette. As she grew older, she frequently borrowed her father's books and read much French literature, including the work of the feminist George Sand. In later years, she regarded the childhood tutoring she received as frivolous and wrote that her father and brothers did not feel women required serious education; Stasova recalled that they would tease and belittle her.

As a young woman in her twenties, Stasova was engaged to a military officer. Shortly before their wedding, her fiancé, under severe parental pressure, left her and married another woman. Stasova, desolate, vowed that she would never marry. She spent a number of years abroad caring for her sister Sofya, to whom she was very close. Sofya died of consumption in 1858, at which point Stasova returned to Russia. Stasova decided to direct her energies away from her own family and towards the "universal family" of the needy and dispossessed. Discussing the limited options available to women at the time, Stasova later wrote that Russian feminists desired "not the moonlight, but rather the sunlight."

== Career ==
Through Maria Vasilievna Trubnikova's salon, Stasova became connected with a large group of wealthy women concerned with the economic and educational status of women in Russia. Trubnikova, a translator and activist more than a decade younger than Stasova, actively sought to educate fellow women on feminist issues, seeing her salon as way to connect and empower them. Stasova, Trubnikova, and fellow feminist Anna Pavlovna Filosofova became close friends and allies, and were referred to by their contemporaries as the "triumvirate". The three became leaders of the feminist movement in the Russian Empire, though they did not describe themselves as feminists. The historian Richard Stites describes the triumvirate as "the three major [feminist] figures", who drew on support from wider circles of dozens of women who "moved in and out" of various roles.

The later author Ariadna Vladimirovna Tyrkova-Williams wrote that "[The triumvirate's] members perfectly complemented one another. The plans and will came from Trubnikova. Stasova's part was the performance, the persistence in doing the job. Filosofosva embodied spirituality and ethics." In contrast with the contemporaneous Russian nihilist movement, the members of the triumvirate were not radical in public style or fashion and were not ostracized by other members of the upper class for their work.

The triumvirate, alongside a number of other women, began organizing the Society for Cheap Lodgings and Other Benefits for the Citizens of St. Petersburg in 1859. The group had two factions, the "German party" and the "Russian party", which differed on their preferred approach. (Note: The "Germans" were primarily descended from German or Baltic aristocratic families, according to Richard Stites, a professor of Russian history at Georgetown University.) The "Germans" favored a then-traditional method of philanthropy that involved close supervision of the poor. The "Russians" focused on self-help and direct aid, attempting to avoid patronization and to maintain the privacy of those aided. In early 1861, the incipient organization split in two, with the Stasova–Trubnikova–Filosofova triumvirate leading the "Russians". A charter for their society, now smaller, was approved by the Tsarist government in February 1861. The organization provided housing and work as seamstresses to its female clients (primarily widows and wives whose husbands had abandoned them). It also operated a day care center and a communal kitchen.

In 1860, meanwhile, Stasova and her sister-in-law, Polixena Stasova, opened and helped to lead a school aimed at teaching literacy, as part of the brief Sunday school movement in Russia. (Note: The term "Sunday school" does not imply religious education, but simply describes the day classes were held, as the traditional day of rest for the Russian lower classes.) The school, which served blue-collar women, was closed by the Russian government in 1862 as part of their broader crackdown on Sunday schools. In response, Stasova began teaching classes at her home instead. Stasova, along with the philanthropist Maria Mikhailovna Dondukova-Korsakova, was also involved with a shelter at the Kalinkinskaya Hospital treating prostitutes affected by sexually transmitted infections.

In 1863, the triumvirate, along with the activist Anna Nikolayevna Engelhardt, founded the Russian Women's Publishing Cooperative (Russian: Женский издательский кооператив, Zhenskaia Isdatel'skaia Kooperativ). Employing dozens of women, the cooperative focused on writing and translation. It published a wide variety of books, including textbooks, scientific works, and children's stories, such as Darwin's On the Origin of Species and Hans Christian Andersen's Fairy Tales. Stasova's role focused on handling business with printers, binders, and suppliers. Although it was initially successful, the cooperative never received governmental approval, and suffered financial difficulties after Stasova and Trubnikova later went abroad and its bookselling partner went bankrupt. Nevertheless, under Filosofova's management, it lasted until 1879.

=== Higher education ===
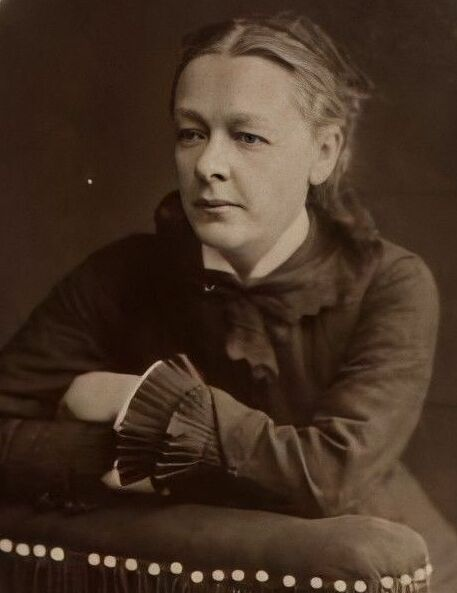
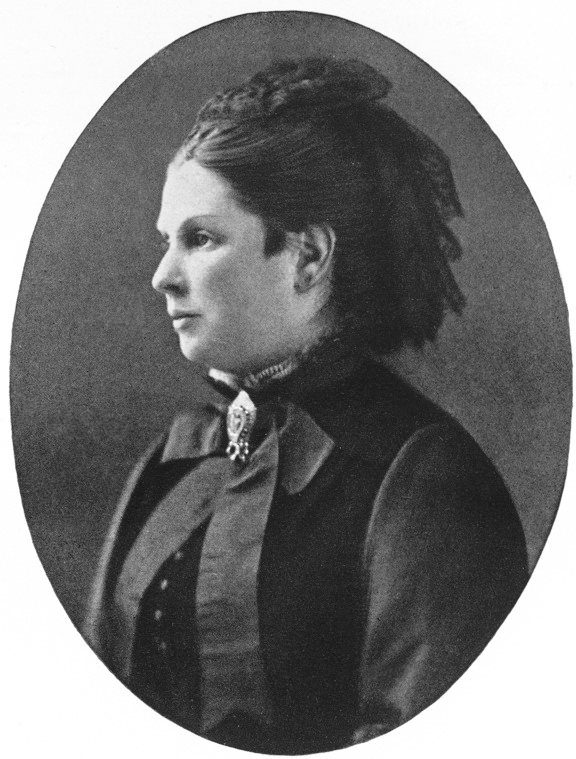
Throughout her career, Stasova worked closely with Maria Trubnikova (left) and Anna Filosofova (right).

In 1867, the triumvirate, spurred by writer Evgenia Ivanovna Konradi, began pushing for Russian universities to create courses open to women. The campaign began with a meeting at Trubnikova's home between scores of interested women and (male) scholars, where a plan of action was agreed upon. The women wrote a petition to Karl Fedorovich Kessler, the rector of the St. Petersburg University. With a particular talent for organizing widespread support, they gathered over 400 signatures among middle- and upper-class women. Seeking the establishment of a women's university, the triumvirate received support from Kessler to create "regular, serious courses" open to women, in the words of historian Christine Johanson.

The next step was to obtain approval from Dmitry Andreyevich Tolstoy, who was responsible for the education system as the Minister of National Enlightenment. Tolstoy argued that women would abandon education after being married, and dismissed the signatories by stating that they were "sheep" merely following the latest fashion. He rejected the petition in late 1868, but under pressure from Tsar Alexander II, allowed less-advanced, mixed-gender public lectures which women could attend. These were rapidly taken up, overwhelmingly by women.

In Tsarist Russia, state policy was poorly coordinated and inconsistent due to the competing interests of rival ministers, and the triumvirate looked for another path to support higher education for women. They appealed to the more liberal war minister Dmitry Alekseyevich Milyutin, who, persuaded by his wife, daughter, and Filosofova, agreed to host medical courses for women in Saint Petersburg. Tolstoy countered by permitting the classes, but at his own quarters, where he could monitor them. The political movement in favor of women's education continued to grow, and by October 1869, the Russian government permitted a limited set of lectures for women on advanced subjects (including chemistry, history, anatomy, zoology, and Russian literature). Stasova organized these and recruited the professors to teach them; the lectures began in January 1870. Attended by over 700 women, they became known as the Vladimirskii lectures, after their host, the Vladimir college.

Stasova spent 1871 to 1876 in Germany, caring for two of her nieces, who were ill. During her absence, she remained in frequent contact with Filosofova and Trubnikova. The Vladimirskii lectures, limited though they were, were shut down in 1875, to her dismay. After her return to Russia, she resumed her activism. Tolstoy, meanwhile, had become concerned about the number of Russian women going abroad for education, particularly to Switzerland.

In April 1876, at Tolstoy's urging, Alexander II permitted the creation of courses for higher education for women, although admission to men's universities was still barred. Stasova served as chair of the pedagogical council which established the Bestuzhev Courses in Saint Petersburg; they began in 1878. By 1881, the courses covered a full four-year university schedule. Tolstoy limited the funding available; government support provided only 7 percent of the budget, and tuition was therefore expensive. Stasova raised charitable support for the students and successfully pushed for the admission of Jewish students, as well as locating permanent lodgings for the courses in 1883. The radicalism of some of the students led to criticism, however, and admission to the courses was halted in 1886.

By 1889, Stasova, along with fellow feminist Elena Osipovna Likhacheva persuaded the Tsar (then Alexander III) to permit the courses to reopen. However, as part of the reactionary éminence grise Konstantin Petrovich Pobedonostsev's efforts to bring educational institutions under government control, Stasova was forced to step down as director, officially accused of "inefficiency and muddle headedness". She and her colleagues were replaced by more tractable government bureaucrats. At the Bestuzhev graduation that year, Stasova was honored, and her portrait was painted by Ilya Repin to commemorate the occasion.

=== Later career ===
Despite this setback, Stasova kept working. She helped create the Children's Aid Society in St. Petersburg. She served as a mentor to Liubov Gurevich and other younger feminists; the historian Rochelle Ruthchild writes that she "achieved almost saintlike status among those who knew her, as they noted with awe her unquenchable fervor". In 1893, Stasova and others sent an exhibit focusing on the progress of women in Russia to the World's Columbian Exposition in Chicago. In 1895 Stasova, along with Filosofova and others, founded the Russian Women's Mutual Philanthropic Society, which, under the restrictive laws of the Tsarist autocracy, was limited to philanthropic ventures such as a kindergarten, hostel, and employment service. Stasova led the organization as chair until her death the same year, and was replaced by Anna Nikolaevna Shabanova.

Although she was ill, Stasova worked diligently right up until her death on October 9 [O.S. September 27] 1895. Close to the end of her life, she wrote that Russian women "still have not learned to stop being men's slaves". She continued: "In everything they restrain themselves, are frightened, subordinate... This is bad, very bad! There is much work ahead for women before they will achieve their liberation." Stasova was buried in Tikhvin Cemetery in St. Petersburg.
