= Nerekhtsky Uyezd =

Administrative subdivision of the Russian Empire

Nerekhtsky Uyezd (Нерехтский уезд) was one of the subdivisions of the Kostroma Governorate of the Russian Empire. It was situated in the southwestern part of the governorate. Its administrative centre was Nerekhta.

== Demographics ==
At the time of the Russian Empire Census of 1897, Nerekhtsky Uyezd had a population of 149,859. Of these, 99.9% spoke Russian as their native language.
