= Varvara Komarova-Stasova =

Russian writer and musicologist (1862–1942)

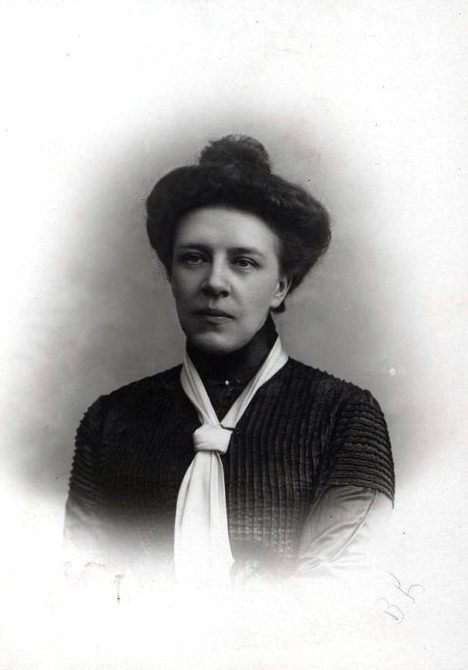

Varvara Dmitrievna Komarova-Stasova (1862 – 1942) was a Russian writer and musicologist, who published under the pen name Vladimir Karenin. She wrote a four-volume biography of George Sand.

== Life ==
Varvara Stasova was the daughter of the liberal lawyer Dmitry Stasov. Her aunt was the feminist Nadezhda Stasova, and her younger sister Elena became a leading Bolshevik. In a book of memoirs, Childhood Memories of Great People, she recalled visitors to her childhood home including Modest Mussorgsky.

Her first publication was a female Bildungsroman, Musia (1888). Her next effort was a biography of the 18th-century German actor-manager Friederike Caroline Neuber, which she later tried unsuccessfully to adapt for the stage. By 1891, she was at work on her biography of Sand, which appeared between 1899 and 1926.
