= Nadezhda Sokhanskaia =

Russian short story writer and autobiographer

Nadezhda Stepanovna Sokhanskaia
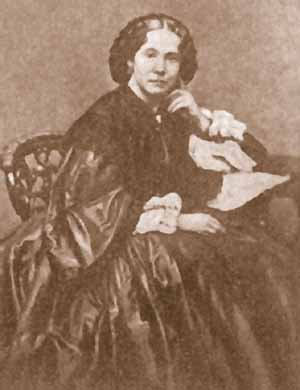
- Соханская, Надежда Степановна
- Born: 1 March 1823; Kursk Governorate
- Died: 15 December 1884 (aged 61); Kharkov Governorate
- Writing career
- Pen name: Kokhanovskaïa
- Genres: short stories, autobiography

Nadezhda Stepanovna Sokhanskaia (Russian: Наде́жда Степа́новна Соханская, 1 March 1823 – 15 December 1884) was a Russian short story writer and autobiographer who wrote about Ukraine, using the pen name Kokhanovskaya (Кохановская).

== Life ==
Sokhanskaia was born in Kursk Governorate in 1823. Her father was an Army captain, and he died when she was a small child. She attended a boarding school from the age of eleven to seventeen where she was a prize-winning student. When she returned home, she found that her family were destitute. She failed to find work befitting her ambitions and it was only religion that gave her hope.

Sokhanskaia was still reading, and she wrote short stories that she submitted. She sent copies to the literary critic Pyotr Pletnyov who had edited the journal The Contemporary. He advised her to write about her own life. This improved her style and during the 1850s she published many stories about local life. These stories were set in the area where she lived in Ukraine that included the local culture and its history. She continued to write throughout her life and her Autobiography was published in 1896 after her death in Kharkov Governorate in 1884.
