= Dmitry Stasov =

Russian lawyer (1828–1918)

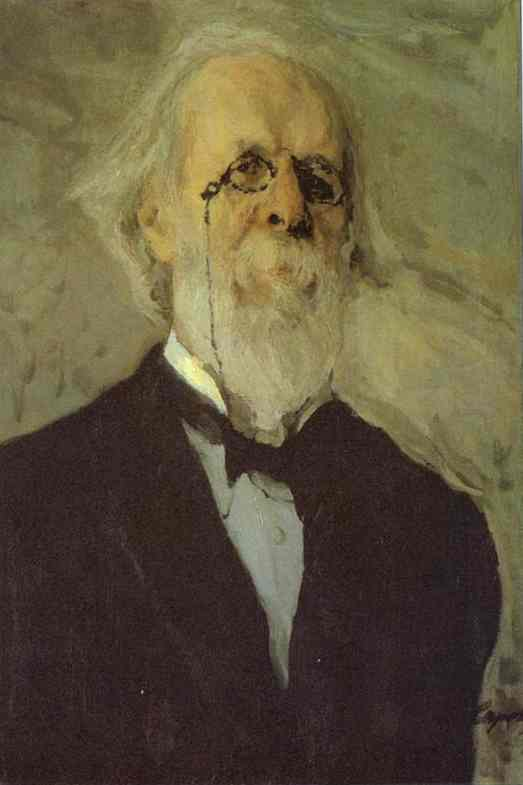
Portrait of Dmitry Stasov by Valentin Serov, 1908

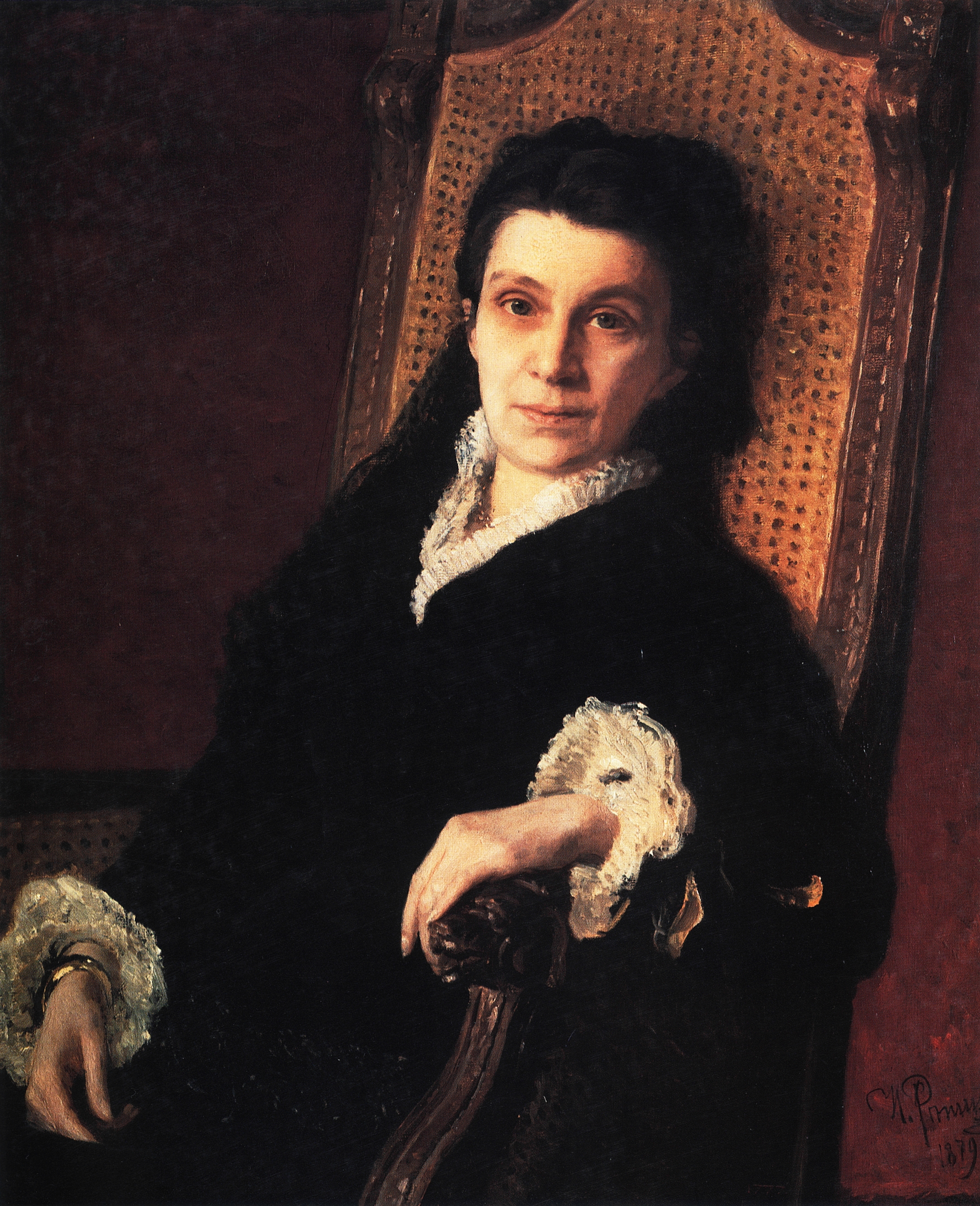
Portrait of Dmitry's wife, Poliksena Stepanovna Stasova, by Ilya Repin, 1879

Dmitry Vasilievich Stasov (Note: In this name that follows East Slavic naming customs, the patronymic is Vasilievich and the family name is Stasov.) (Russian: Дмитрий Васильевич Стасов; 1 February [O.S. 20 January] 1828 – 28 April 1918) was a Russian lawyer who was a leading figure in the juridical reforms of the 1860s. He was the brother of the critic Vladimir Stasov and the activist Nadezhda Stasova. Stasov was father of the Bolshevik revolutionary Elena Stasova, and the writer and musicologist Varvara Stasova.

== Career ==
In 1847, Dmitry, like his brother Vladimir before him, graduated from the Imperial School of Jurisprudence in Saint Petersburg. After completing his education, he served in the Heraldry Department of the Governing Senate. In the summer of 1856, Dmitry Vasilyevich participated as a herald in the coronation of Tsar Alexander II and was honored with a diamond ring with a ruby.

In 1858, Stasov was appointed as the Chief Secretary of the Civil Department of the Senate. In 1859, he organized a circle of young lawyers and contributed significantly to the preparation of Alexander II's Judicial Reform in 1864.

In September 1861, Stasov left government service and started a private legal practice. With the implementation of the Judicial Charters in 1864, he was among the first to register as a sworn attorney. On 17 April 1866, the official day of the sworn attorney's birthday, Stasov was accepted into its ranks. He was elected as the chairman of the first (Saint Petersburg) council of sworn attorneys on 2 May of the same year. For the last time, the Saint Petersburg council elected Dmitry Vasilyevich as its chairman in 1911, when he was 84 years old, and he remained at the helm until 1914.

Dmitry Vasilyevich Stasov was friends with many artists, writers, and composers. He conducted trials in 1871 and 1881, serving as the lawyer for Pyotr Ilyich Tchaikovsky and his publisher Pyotr Jurgenson against the director of the State Capella Nikolai Bakhmetev and Moscow Ober-Police Chief Aleksandr Kozlov.

An educated amateur musician (he studied piano with Anton Herke and Adolf von Henselt), Stasov was a notable figure in the Russian musical life of the mid-19th century. He maintained friendly relationships with Mikhail Glinka, Alexander Dargomyzhsky, Mily Balakirev, César Cui, Modest Mussorgsky, and other composers. He was one of the leaders of the Concert Society founded by Alexei Lvov in 1850. In 1859, he became one of the directors of the Russian Musical Society.

Biographer D. M. Léger rightly noted that Dmitry Vasilyevich's played a decisive role in the adoption of the law on the copyright of musicians and composers in 1882, extending copyright to 50 years and introducing completely different remuneration norms.

During the celebration of the 50th anniversary of the Judicial Charters of 1864, Stasov was presented with a golden badge of a sworn attorney on behalf of the estate, the only one in all of Russia, and a fund was established in his name to support the legal profession.

== Selected publications ==
- Muzykal'nye vospominaniya
