= Staš =

Staš (feminine: Stašová) is a Czech-language surname. Notable people with the surname include:

- Břetislav Staš (born 1928), Czech seismologist and geophysicist
- Ivo Staš (born 1965), Czech footballer
- Jana Stašová (born 1960), Slovak handball player
- Simona Stašová (born 1955), Czech actress

== See also ==
- Stašek, a surname derived from the diminutive form of Staš
