= Elena Stasova =

Soviet politician (1873–1966)

- Елена Стасова
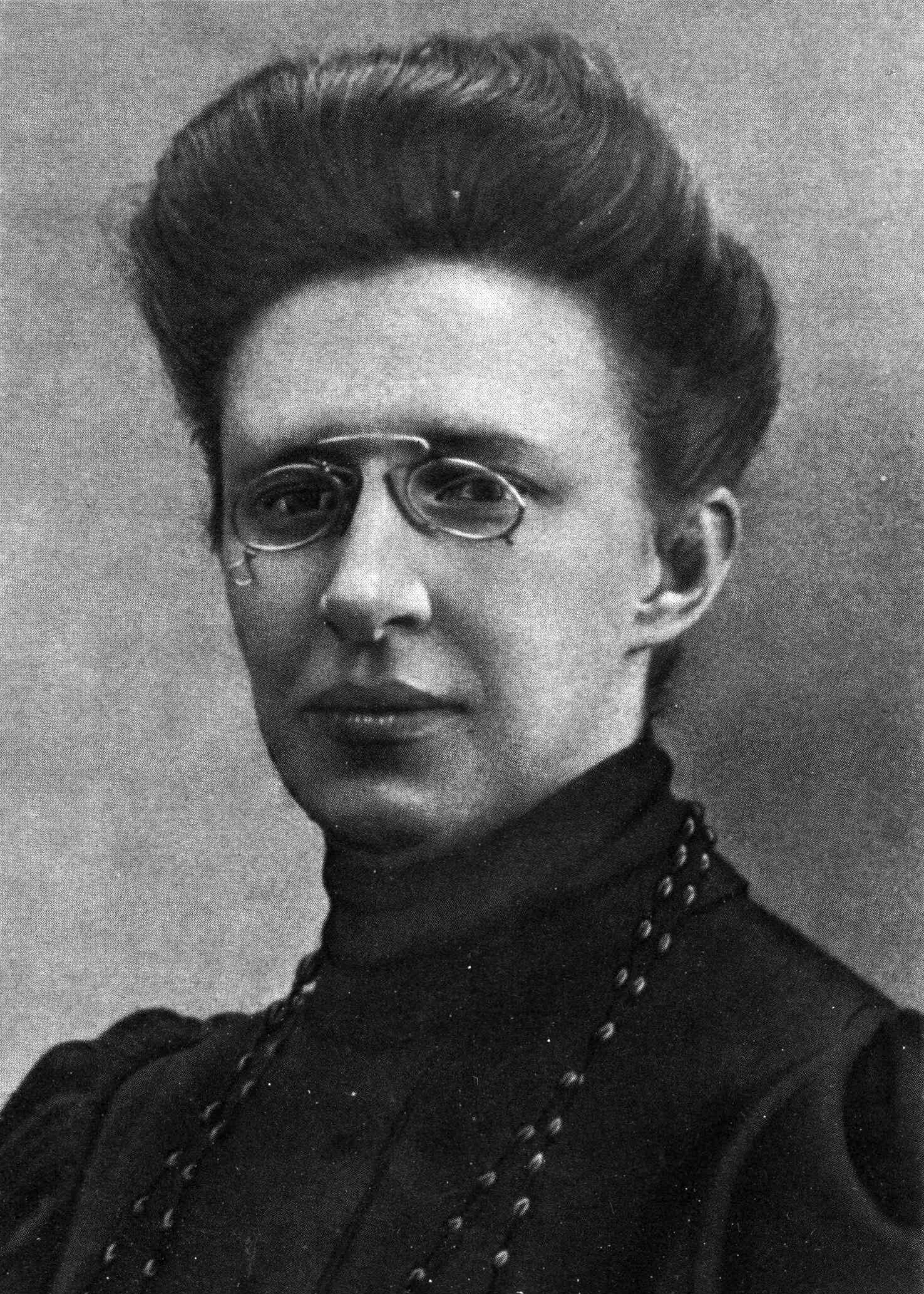
- Stasova, c. 1907

Chairwoman of the Secretariat of the Russian Communist Party (Bolsheviks)
- In office 25 March 1919 – 29 November 1919
- Preceded by: Yakov Sverdlov
- Succeeded by: Nikolay Krestinsky (as Responsible Secretary)

Technical Secretary of the Central Committee of the Russian Social Democratic Labour Party (Bolsheviks)
- In office April 1917 – 1918
- Preceded by: Position established
- Succeeded by: Yakov Sverdlov (as Chairman)

Full member of the 7th Politburo
- In office 11 March – 25 March 1919

Candidate member of the 8th Politburo
- In office 13 April – 26 September 1919

Member of the 6th, 7th, 8th Secretariat
- In office 6 August 1917 – 5 April 1920

Personal details
- Born: 15 October [O.S. 3 October] 1873 Saint Petersburg, Russian Empire
- Died: 31 December 1966 (aged 93) Moscow, Russian SFSR, Soviet Union
- Resting place: Kremlin Wall Necropolis, Moscow
- Party: RSDLP (1898–1912; Bolshevik faction, from 1903); RCP(b) (Note: Founded as the RSDLP(b) in 1912; renamed the RCP(b) in 1918, then the AUCP(b) in 1925) (1912–1946)

Elena Dmitriyevna Stasova (Note: In this name that follows East Slavic naming customs, the patronymic is Dmitriyevna and the family name is Stasova.) (Russian: Елена Дмитриевна Стасова; 15 October [O.S. 3 October] 1873 – 31 December 1966) was a Russian Soviet revolutionary, Old Bolshevik and an early leader of the Russian Communist Party (Bolsheviks).

Stasova was born to an eminent aristocratic family in Saint Petersburg. She worked as a teacher during her youth and came to embrace revolutionary politics. In 1898, she joined the Russian Social Democratic Labour Party (RSDLP) at the time of its establishment. Following the RSDLP ideological split in 1903, Stasova joined Vladimir Lenin's Bolshevik faction. She continued her revolutionary activities in Russia, Switzerland and Finland despite frequent threats of imprisonment and deportation. In 1913, she was exiled to Siberia, but returned to Saint Petersburg shortly before the February Revolution. She was named secretary and alternate member of the Central Committee, but by 1920 she had been fully frozen out of Soviet power. Afterwards, Stasova was a Comintern representative to Germany until 1927, when she returned to Russia and took on a leadership position in the International Red Aid (MOPR). From 1938 to 1946, she found work as an editor of the magazine International Literature. Stasova died in 1966 at the age of 93.

== Biography ==
=== Early years ===
Elena Stasova was born in Saint Petersburg in 1873, the youngest of five children, in an eminent noble family. Her father was the state attorney Dmitry Stasov, while her aunt was the feminist activist Nadezhda Stasova. She was educated at home until the age of 13, and then at the prestigious Tagantsev private school for girls. Stasova described her political awakening as being tied to a realization that other people "made it possible for us, the intelligentsia, to live the way we did." At the age of about 20 she began teaching in evening classes and Sunday schools in Ligovo, which brought her into contact with female political activists such as Nadezhda Krupskaya, future wife of Vladimir Lenin. She joined the Russian Social Democratic Workers Party (RSDLP) at the time of its establishment in 1898, her main contribution being to use her parents' house to store illegal socialist literature.

=== Family ===
Her grandfather, Vasili Stasov, had been architect to Emperors of all the Russias Alexander I and Nicholas I. Her uncle was art critic Vladimir Stasov. Her father, Dmitry (1828–1918), was the most eminent liberal Russian lawyer of his generation. As a young man, he had a promising career working for the Senate, and a Herald at the coronation of Alexander II – but was barred for life from government service after he was arrested during a student demonstration. He set up in private practice, and was defence counsel in numerous political trials, including the trial of Dmitry Karakozov, the first of the revolutionaries to attempt to assassinate Alexander II, the Trial of the 50, which was the first political trial to be held in public in Russia, and at Russia's largest political trial, the Trial of the 193. He was arrested in 1880, by order of the Tsar, and banished from St Petersburg for a time. Later, he was President of the Russian Council of Lawyers. A keen pianist, he also co-founded the St Petersburg Conservatory with Anton Rubinstein. Elena's aunt was the feminist Nadezhda Stasova, and her older sister was the writer Varvara Komarova-Stasova.

=== Bolshevik revolutionary ===
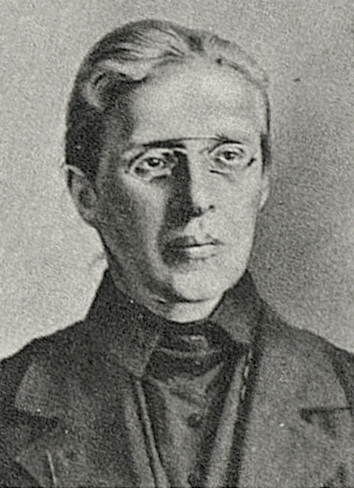
Stasova, c. 1906

When the RSDLP split into Bolshevik and Menshevik factions in 1903, Stasova cast her lot with Lenin and the Bolsheviks as a professional revolutionary. Over the next two years Stasova adopted the pseudonyms "Absolute" and "Thick". Other pseudonyms which Stasova used during the underground period included "Delta", "Heron", "Knol", and "Varvara Ivanovna". She served as the conduit for Lenin's newspaper, Iskra, in St. Petersburg, until her arrest in January 1904, which forced her to leave the capital and hide in Minsk. For the rest of that year she traveled to several cities, acting as a specialist in "technical matters", such as creating false passports, organising escape routes, and making contact with sympathisers in the Russian army. She also taught new members how to encode and decode. In spring 1904, Stasova was appointed secretary of the Northern Bureau of the Bolshevik Central Committee. In June, she was assigned to take over the Southern Bureau, based in Odessa, but was arrested and held in Taganka Prison for six months. She was released on bail in December 1904, and returned to St Petersburg, where she took over as secretary of the city Bolshevik organisation, and later as secretary of the Central Committee.

Stasova emigrated to Geneva, Switzerland in August 1905, to run the Bolshevik organisation abroad while Lenin was in Russia for the Russian Revolution of 1905. She returned to St Petersburg in January 1906 and then moved to Finland to organise arms smuggling, and to assist in organising the Congress in Stockholm that was supposed to unify the Bolshevik and Menshevik factions of the RSDLP. Arrested in July 1906, after her return to St Petersburg, she was banned for the second time from living in the capital. In 1907, she settled in Tiflis (now Tbilisi), the capital of Georgia.

In January 1912, Stasova was elected as an alternate member of the Bolshevik party's Central Committee. She was then secretary to the party's Russian bureau. Arrested on her return to Tiflis, in May 1912, she was tried in May 1913, with Suren Spandaryan and others, and sentenced to deportation to Siberia. She was allowed to return to St Petersburg in autumn 1916, and was arrested there and held in a police station overnight in February 1917, but released in the morning because of the outbreak of the February Revolution.

=== Political career ===
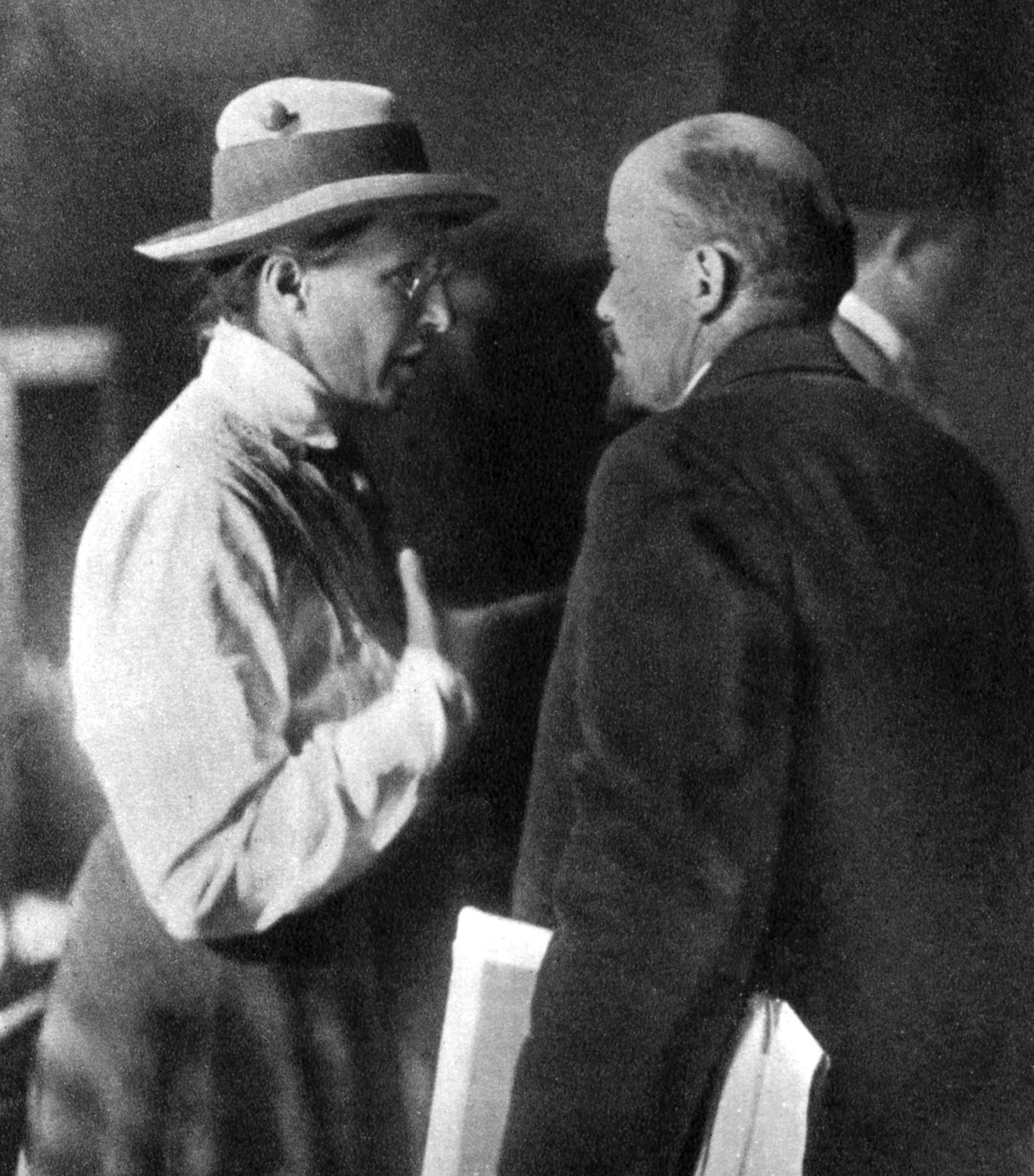
Stasova and Vladimir Lenin at the 2nd Comintern Congress, 1920

After the February Revolution of 1917, Stasova became the Technical Secretary of the Central Committee of the Bolshevik party — a position which she retained through the October Revolution, finally standing down in March 1920. She was also appointed an alternate member of the Bolshevik Central Committee by the 6th Congress of the Russian Communist Party in 1917, and became the only woman elected to full membership of the Central Committee by the 7th Congress of 1918 and the 8th Congress of 1919. However, the 9th Congress of 1920 dropped her both from the Central Committee and from the party secretariat.

After being removed from the Central Committee, Stasova worked for the Petrograd party organization, from where she was brought into the Comintern's apparatus. She was appointed Comintern representative to the Communist Party of Germany (KPD) in May 1921. She used the pseudonym "Hertha" and remained in Germany through 1926, where she played a leading role in the German affiliate of the International Red Aid (MOPR) organization, die Rote Hilfe.

Stasova returned to the USSR in February 1926. The next year she was named deputy director head of the international MOPR as well as head of the Central Committee of the MOPR organization in the USSR, positions which she retained through 1937.

Stasova served as a member of the Central Control Commission of the Russian Communist Party from 1930 to 1934, and in 1935 the 7th World Congress of the Comintern named her a member of the International Control Commission.

Unlike so many other "Old Bolsheviks", Stasova was not arrested during the spy mania and secret-police terror which swept the Soviet Union in the late 1930s, although in November 1937, Joseph Stalin told the head of Comintern, Georgi Dimitrov that Stasova was "scum" and "probably" would be arrested. She was dismissed from her post on MOPR five days later, on 16 November 1937. Unusually, she retained her place on the International Control Commission until the Comintern was abolished in 1943, and in 1938 was re-employed as an editor of the magazine International Literature. Stasova continued in this role until 1946, when she retired.

In 1948, she received a "severe reprimand" for saying in a public lecture that "Lenin treated all comrades equally and even called Bukharin 'Bukharchik'" — ten years earlier Bukharin had confessed to being a traitor. She wrote later that the words "slipped out" and that it was "a grave political mistake" on her part.

=== Death and legacy ===
After Stalin's death, Elena Stasova was the last surviving Old Bolshevik who had served on the Central Committee during the 1917 revolution. She made very few public appearances after retiring, but in 1961, she was one of four Old Bolsheviks who signed an appeal to the 22nd Congress of the Communist Party of the Soviet Union for the posthumous rehabilitation of Nikolai Bukharin.

A boarding school for foreigners in Ivanovo, Russia called the Ivanovo International Boarding School ("Interdom"), established by MOPR in 1933, was named after Elena Stasova.

Stasova died on 31 December 1966 at Moscow and was placed in an urn in the Kremlin Wall Necropolis.

== Writings ==
- MOPR's Banners Abroad: Report to the Third MOPR Congress of the Soviet Union. Moscow: Executive Committee of International Red Aid, 1931. (By-line given as "H. Stassova" on cover.)

== Honours and awards ==
- Hero of Socialist Labour (1960)
- Order of Lenin (5 times: 1933, 1953, 1956, 1960, 1963)

== See also ==
- Outline of the Russian Revolution and Civil War
- Bibliography of the Russian Revolution and Civil War
- Bibliography of Stalinism and the Soviet Union
- Index of Old Bolsheviks
- Index of articles related to the Russian Revolution and Civil War
