= Vladimir Stasov =

Russian music and art critic (1824–1906)

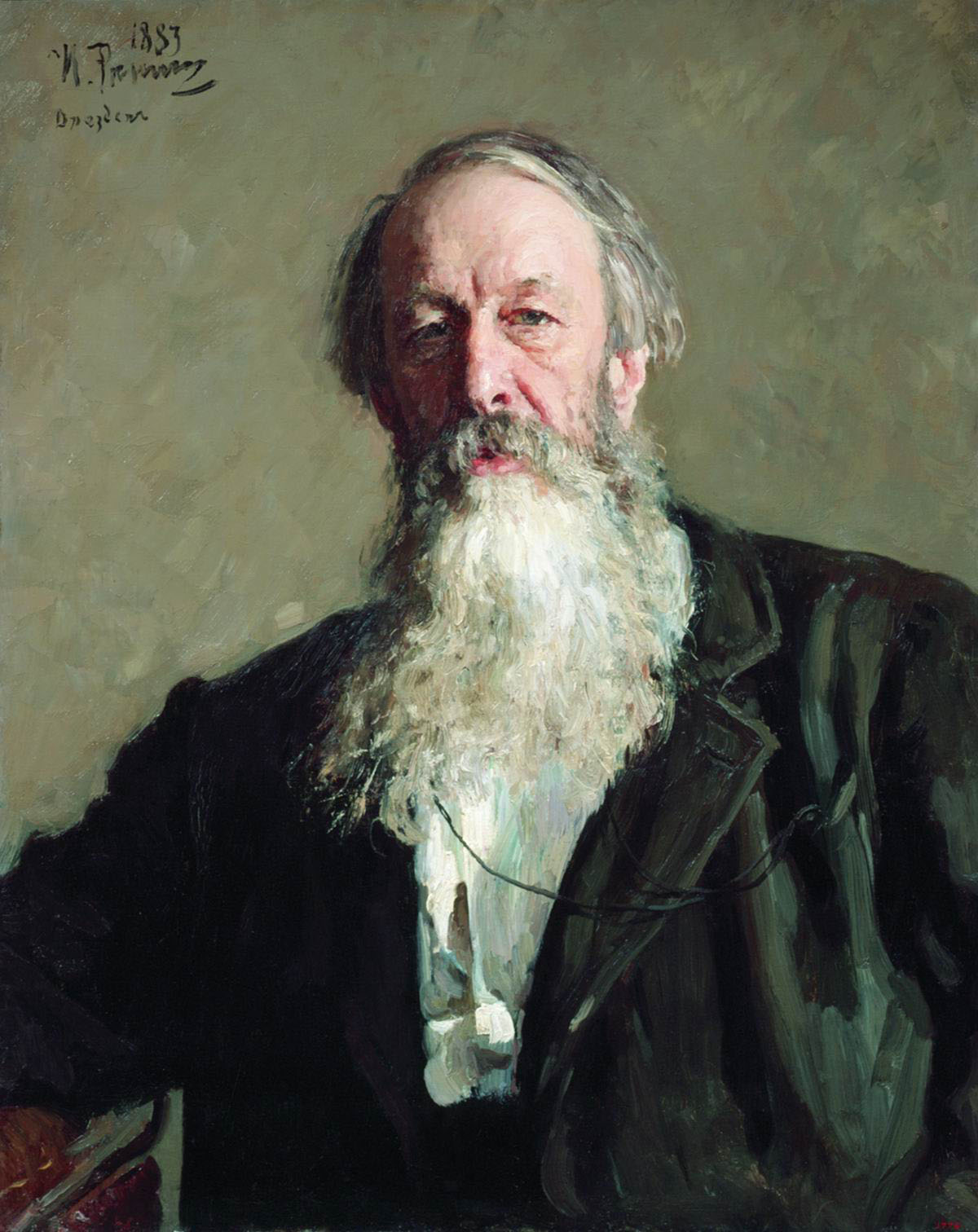
Portrait by Ilya Repin, 1883

Vladimir Vasilievich Stasov (Note: In this name that follows East Slavic naming customs, the patronymic is Vasilievich and the family name is Stasov.) (also Stassov; Russian: Влади́мир Васи́льевич Ста́сов; 14 January [O.S. 2 January] 1824 – 23 October [O.S. 10 October] 1906) was a Russian critic of music and art.

Born into a wealthy, noble family, Stasov became a prominent figure in mid-19th-century Russian culture. He discovered a large number of Russia's greatest talents, inspired many of their works and fought their battles in numerous articles and letters to the press. As such, he carried on a lifelong debate with Russian novelist and playwright Ivan Turgenev, who considered Stasov "our great all-Russian critic." He wanted Russian art to liberate itself from what he saw as Europe's hold. By copying the west, he felt, Russian artists could be, at best, second-rate. However, by borrowing from their own native traditions, they might create a truly national art that could match Europe's with its high artistic standards and originality. By "national" Stasov meant an art that would not only portray people's lives but also be meaningful to them and show them how to live.

== Early life and education ==
The son of a famous Russian architect Vasily Petrovich Stasov (1769–1848), Vladimir Stasov was born in Saint Petersburg on 14 January [O.S. 2 January] 1824. He graduated from the School of Jurisprudence in 1843, was admitted to the Imperial Academy of Arts in 1859, and was made honorary fellow of the Russian Academy of Sciences in 1900, together with his friend Leo Tolstoy.

== Career ==
=== "The Mighty Five" ===
In 1847, Stasov published a monograph on Mikhail Glinka's use of folk motifs in his music; from that time, Stasov advocated Russianness over European influence in music. In the years which followed he served as an elder adviser to the group of Russian composers known as "The Mighty Five". He also warmed to Pyotr Ilyich Tchaikovsky after hearing the composer play the finale of his Little Russian Symphony at a Christmas 1872 gathering at Nikolai Rimsky-Korsakov's home. Shortly after this gathering, Stasov prompted Tchaikovsky to write a piece based on Shakespeare's The Tempest. He also drafted a program, initially for Hector Berlioz, that Tchaikovsky eventually used for his Manfred Symphony. In between those two works, Stasov suggested an opera based on Alfred de Vigny's historical romance Cinq-Mars. Tchaikovsky was then intent on writing Eugene Onegin, and Charles Gounod had already written an opera based on Cinq-Mars.

=== Repin and the Peredvizhniki ===
Beginning in the 1870s, Stasov ardently supported the realistic painters known as Peredvizhniki, as well as Ilya Repin.

=== Intolerant of difference ===
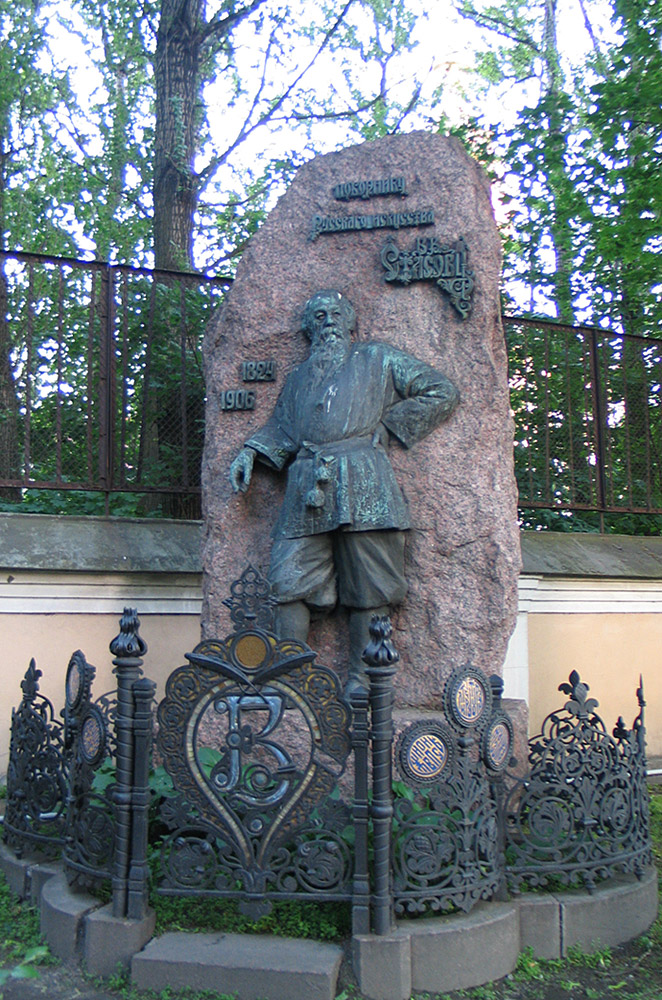
Vladimir Stasov's grave in the cemetery of Alexander Nevsky Lavra

When artists did not follow his precepts, Stasov could become both intolerant and vocal. Stasov called the finale of Tchaikovsky's Little Russian symphony "one of the most important creations of the whole Russian school." Otherwise, his overall verdict on Tchaikovsky's work was negative: "The Conservatoire, academic training, eclecticism and overworking of musical materials laid its dread, destructive hand on him. Of his total output, a few works [Romeo and Juliet, The Tempest, Francesca da Rimini, and the String Quartets 2 and 3] are first-rate and highly original; the remainder are mediocre or weak."

Nor was he consoling about Modest Mussorgsky, a composer who, as a member of "The Five," he had helped nurture but about whom, for all the public praise of his musical gifts, there was always a note of intellectual condescension. Founder Mily Balakirev confided to Stasov that he thought Mussorgsky "almost an idiot." Stasov replied, "I think he is a total idiot." But this exchange reportedly occurred before Mussorgsky wrote his greatest songs and any of his operas, starting in the 1860s.

He was harsher still with the modernist art magazine Mir iskusstva and its founders, Alexandre Benois, Léon Bakst and Sergei Diaghilev when the magazine appeared in 1898. He called Diaghilev "a decadent cheerleader" in print and Mir iskusstva "the courtyard of the lepers" (an image borrowed from Victor Hugo's novel Notre-Dame de Paris).

Stasov's correspondence with leading personalities of Russian art life is invaluable. He is known also for his opposition to music critic and erstwhile friend Alexander Serov regarding the relative merits of Glinka's two operas.

He was so impressed by the literary talent of the Jewish schoolboy Samuil Marshak that he arranged an exception from the Pale of Settlement laws for him and his family.

Stasov's brother, Dmitry Stasov (1828–1918), was a notable advocate who took part in the foundation of the Russian Music Society. His niece, Elena Stasova (1873–1966), was a prominent Marxist revolutionary and functionary in the Soviet government.

== Personal life ==
Stasov died on 23 October [O.S. 10 October] 1906.

== Bibliography ==
- Brown, David (2007). Tchaikovsky: The Man and His Music. New York: Pegasus Books. ISBN 9780571231959.
- Figes, Orlando (2002). Natasha's Dance: A Cultural History of Russia. New York: Metropolitan Books.
- Holden, Anthony (1995). Tchaikovsky: A Biography. New York: Random House.
- Volkov, Solomon (1995). St. Petersburg: A Cultural History. New York: The Free Press, A division of Simon & Schuster, Inc.
