= Feminism in Russia =

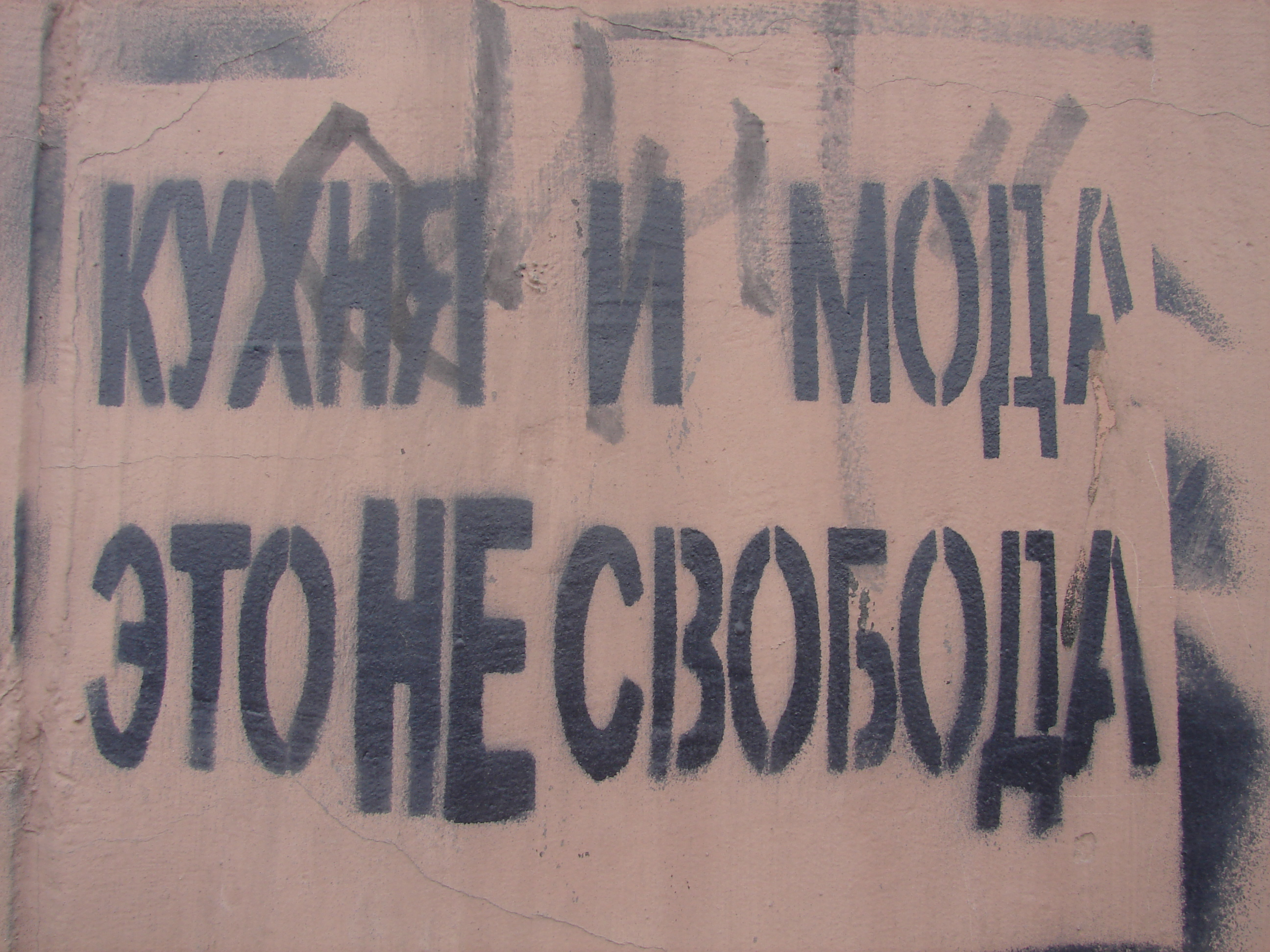
"Kitchen and fashion – that's NOT freedom": Feminist graffiti in St. Petersburg, 2006

In Russia, feminism originated in the 18th century, influenced by the Age of Enlightenment in Western Europe and mostly confined to the aristocracy. Throughout the 19th century, the idea of feminism remained closely tied to revolutionary politics and to social reform. In the 20th century Russian feminists, inspired by socialism, shifted their focus from philanthropic works to labor organizing among peasants and factory workers. After the February Revolution of 1917, feminist lobbying gained suffrage, alongside general equality for women in society. Through this period, the concern with feminism varied depending on demographics and economic status.

After the dissolution of the Soviet Union in 1991, feminist circles arose among the intelligentsia, although the term continues to carry negative connotations among contemporary Russians. In the 21st century, some Russian feminists, such as the punk-rock band Pussy Riot, have again aligned themselves with anti-government movements, as in the 2012 demonstrations against Russian president Vladimir Putin, which led to a lawyer representing the Russian Orthodox Church calling feminism a mortal sin.

== Origins ==
=== 18th century ===
Russian feminism originated in the 18th century, influenced by the Western European Enlightenment and the prominent role of women as a symbol for democracy and freedom in the French Revolution. Notable Russian intellectual figures of the following 19th century, such as Alexander Pushkin and Alexander Herzen, wrote positively about the increased power and independence of women in their society and supported the growing concern for gender equality.

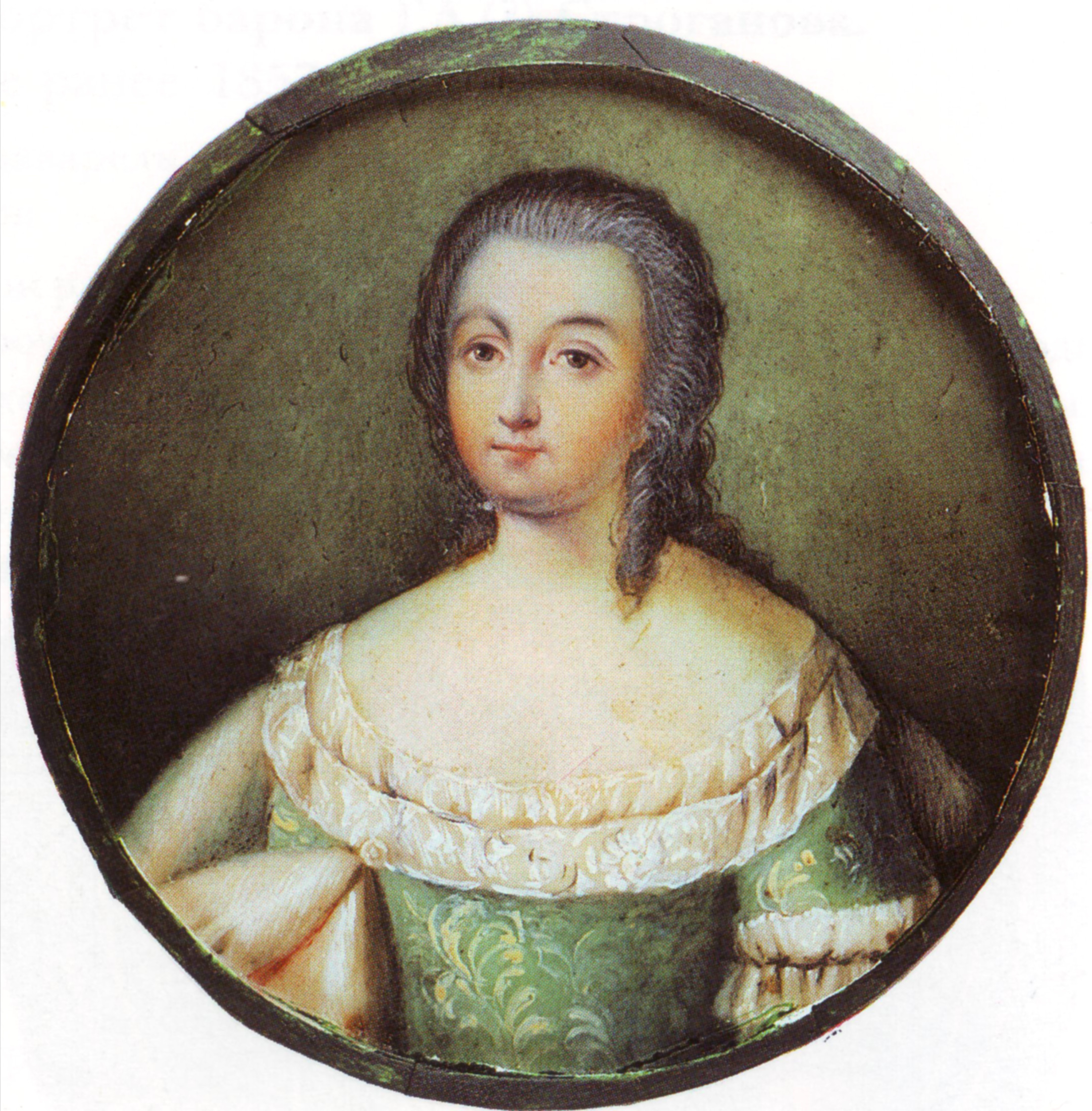
Portrait of Princess Natalia Sheremeteva, first female Russian autobiographer and one of the Decembrist women

In aristocratic Russian society, the greater freedoms allowed to women led to the rise of the powerful, socially-connected woman, including such iconic figures as Catherine the Great, Maria Naryshkina, and Countess Maria Razumovskaya. Women also began to compete with men in the literary sphere, with Russian women authors, poets, and memoirists increasing in popularity.

=== 19th century ===
The loosening of restrictions on women's education and personal freedom that were enacted by Peter the Great in the 18th century created a new class of educated women, such as Princess Natalia Sheremeteva, whose 1767 Notes was the first autobiography by a woman in Russia. In the 19th century, Sheremeteva was one of the "Decembrist women", the female relatives of the Decembrists. The male Decembrists were a group of aristocratic revolutionaries who in 1825 were convicted of plotting to overthrow Emperor Nicholas I, and many of whom were sentenced to serve in labor camps in Siberia. Though the wives, sisters, and mothers of the Decembrist men shared the same liberal democratic political views as their male relatives, they were not charged with treason, because they were women; however, 11 of them, including Sheremeteva and Princess Mariya Volkonskaya, still chose to accompany their husbands, brothers, and sons to the labor camps. Though they were portrayed as heroes in popular culture, the Decembrist women insisted that they were simply doing their duty to their family. While in Siberia, some of them cared not only for their own relatives, but also for the other prisoners. They also set up important institutions like libraries and clinics, as well as arranging lectures and concerts.

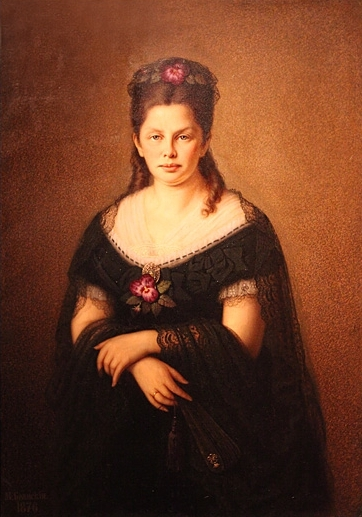
Anna Filosofova, co-founder of the Russian Women's Mutual Philanthropic Society

In the historical writing of the time, the humble devotion of the Decembrist women was contrasted with the intrigues and hedonism of female aristocrats of the 18th century, like Catherine the Great, whose excesses were seen as the danger of too-sudden liberation for women. Although they did not explicitly espouse a feminist agenda, the Decembrist women were used as an example by later generations of Russian feminists, whose concern for gender equality was also tied to revolutionary political agendas.

==== Efforts of the "triumvirate" ====
In the late 19th century, other aristocratic women began to turn away from refined society life and focused on feminist reform. Among them was Anna Pavlovna Filosofova, a woman from an aristocratic Moscow family married to a high-ranking bureaucrat, who devoted her energy to various societies and projects to benefit the poor and underprivileged in Russian society, including women. Together with Maria Trubnikova, Nadezhda Stasova and Evgenia Konradi, she lobbied the Emperor to create and fund higher education courses for women. She was also a founding member of the Russian Women's Mutual Philanthropic Society and responsible for helping to organize the All-Women's Congress of 1908. Stasova, Trubnikova, and Anna Filosofova became close friends and allies, and were referred to by their contemporaries as the "triumvirate". The three spent much of their lives working to advance the cause of women, leading the first organized feminist movement in the Russian Empire.

The triumvirate, alongside a number of others, founded the Society for Cheap Lodgings and Other Benefits for the Citizens of St. Petersburg in 1859. The group had two factions, the "German party" and the "Russian party", which differed on their preferred approach. The "Germans" favored a then-traditional method of philanthropy that involved close supervision of the poor. The "Russians" focused on self-help and direct aid, attempting to avoid patronization and maintain the privacy of those aided. In early 1861, the organization split in two, with the Stasova-Trubnikova-Filosofova triumvirate leading the "Russians". The reduced group's charter was approved in February 1861. The organization provided housing and work as seamstresses to its female clients (primarily widows and wives whose husbands had abandoned them). It included a day care and a communal kitchen.

==== Push for higher education ====
The triumvirate also began pushing, in 1867, for Russian universities to create courses for women. Demonstrating "considerable skill in rallying popular support", according to the historian Christine Johanson, the women wrote a carefully-worded petition to Tsar Alexander II. They gathered over 400 signatures among middle and upper-class women. However, there was widespread opposition to the education of women, including by the relevant minister, Dmitry Tolstoy. Tolstoy argued that women would abandon education after being married, and dismissed the signatories by stating that they were "sheep" merely following the latest fashion. He rejected the petition in late 1868, but allowed mixed-gender public lectures which women could attend, under pressure from the Tsar (then Alexander II). However, these were rapidly taken up, overwhelmingly by women.

The triumvirate also appealed to war minister Dmitry Milyutin, who agreed to host the courses after being persuaded by his wife, daughter, and Filosofova. Tolstoy countered by allowing the lectures at his own apartments, where he could monitor them. The political movement in favor of women's education continued to grow, and by October 1869, the Russian government permitted a limited set of courses for women on advanced subjects (including "chemistry, history, anatomy, zoology, and Russian literature"). Stasova organized these and recruited the professors to teach them; the courses began in January 1870. Attended by over 200 women, they became known as the Vladimirskii courses, after their host beginning in 1872, the Vladimir college. The Vladimirskii courses were shut down in 1875.

After further activism from the triumvirate, the Bestuzhev Courses began in 1878; they were a "permanent educational institution for women." The radicalism of some of the students led to criticism, and the courses were shut down in 1886. By 1889, Stasova persuaded the Tsar (then Alexander III) to permit the courses to reopen. However, as part of Konstantin Pobedonostsev's efforts to bring educational institutions under government control, Stasova was forced to step down as director, officially accused of "inefficiency and muddleheadedness". She and her colleagues were replaced by "more compliant" government bureaucrats.

==== Literature ====
At the end of the century, some of the most widely read Russian literary figures focused on feminist motifs in their works. In his later years, Leo Tolstoy argued against the traditional institution of marriage, comparing it to forced prostitution and slavery, a theme that he also touched on in his novel Anna Karenina. In his plays and short stories, Anton Chekhov portrayed a variety of working female protagonists, from actresses to governesses, who sacrificed social esteem and affluence for the sake of financial and personal independence; in spite of this sacrifice, these women are among the few Chekhovian characters who are truly satisfied with their lives. In his influential 1863 novel What is to be Done?, the writer Nikolai Chernyshevski embodied the new feminist ideas in the novel's heroine, Vera Pavlovna, who dreams of a future utopian society with perfect equality among the sexes.

== The Revolution and Soviet era ==
=== Pre-Revolution ===
At the end of the 19th century and the beginning of the 20th century, the focus of Russian feminism shifted from the aristocracy to the peasants and working class. Imbued with socialist ideology, young women began to organize all-women unions among female factory workers, who tended to be ignored or marginalized by male socialists.

Between 1907 and 1917, the League for Women's Equal Rights was the most important feminist organization in Russia. Like the Russian Women's Mutual Philanthropic Society, it was focused on education and social welfare, but it also pushed for equal rights for women, including suffrage, equal inheritance, and an end to passport restrictions. The 1917 Revolution, catalyzed in part by women workers' demonstrations, generated a surge of membership in the organization. In the same year, because of the society's continued lobbying, Russia became the first major world power to grant women the right to vote.

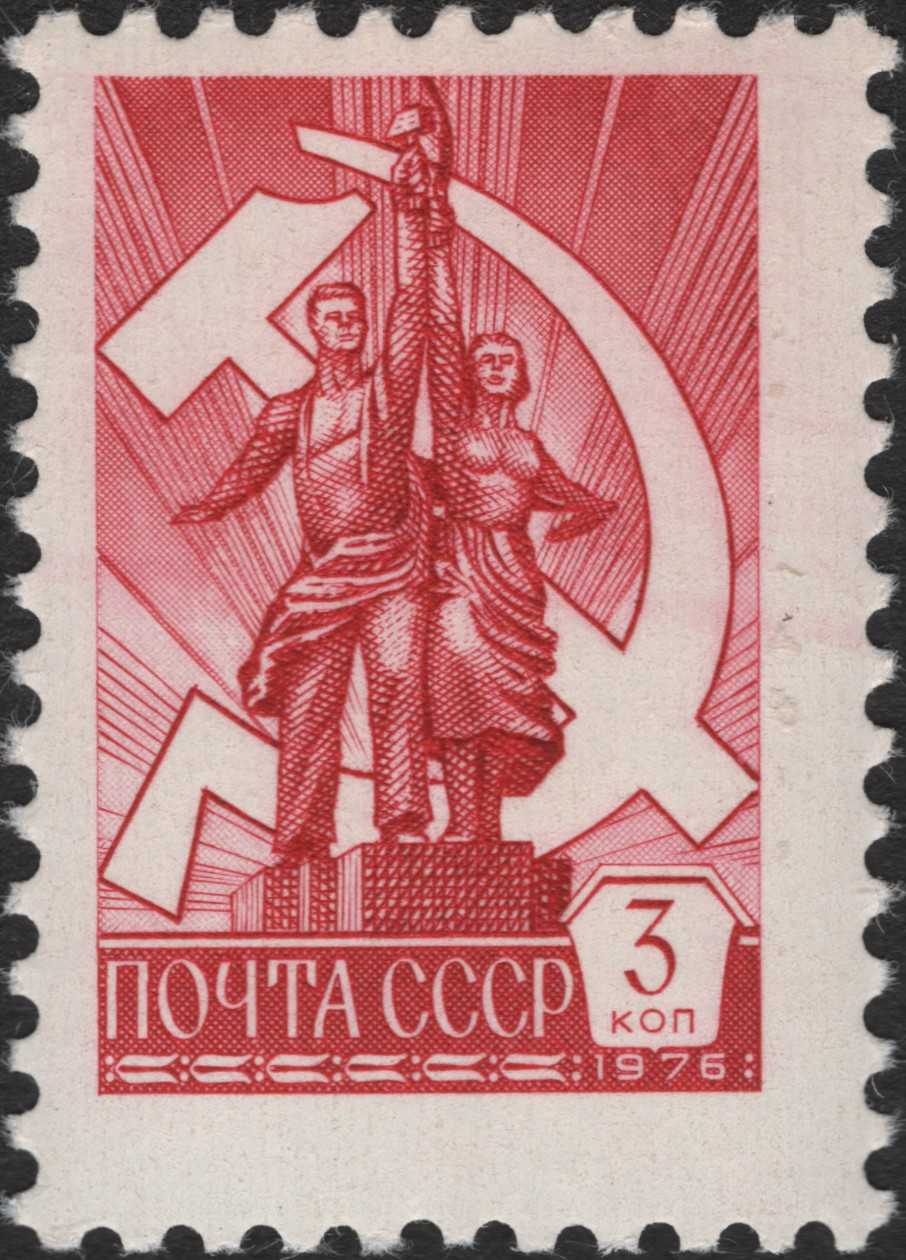
Stamp depicting the iconic Soviet statue that symbolized union of a male worker and a kolkhoz woman, which represented the ideal of equality under Communism.

=== Feminism in Soviet society ===
Vladimir Lenin, who led the Bolsheviks to power in the October Revolution, recognized the importance of women's equality in the Soviet Union (USSR) they established. "To effect [woman's] emancipation and make her the equal of man," he wrote in 1919, two years after the Revolution, following the Marxist theories that underlaid Soviet communism, "it is necessary to be socialized and for women to participate in common productive labor. Then woman will be the equal of man."

In practice, Russian women saw massive gains in their rights under Socialism. Women's suffrage was granted. Abortion was legalized in 1920, making the Soviet Union the first country to do so; however, it was banned again between 1936 and 1955. In 1922, marital rape was made illegal in the Soviet Union. Generous maternity leave was legally required, and a national network of child-care centers was established. The country's first constitution recognized the equal rights of women.

Though the prevailing Soviet ideology stressed total gender equality, and many Soviet women held jobs and advanced degrees, they did not predominantly participate in core political roles and institutions. While propaganda claimed, accurately, that more women sat in the Supreme Soviet than in most democratic countries' legislative bodies combined, only two women, Yekaterina Furtseva and (in its last year of existence) Galina Semyonova, were ever members of the party's Politburo, arguably the most important component of country's government.

By the 1970s, while women's liberation was a mainstream term in American public discourse, no comparable movement existed in the Soviet Union, despite gender-based income inequality and a rate of additional work in the household greater than that experienced by American women. There were also double standards in social norms and expectations. "A man can fool around with other women, drink, even be lackadaisical toward his job, and this is generally forgiven," wrote Hedrick Smith, former Russian correspondent for The New York Times, but "if a woman does the same things, she is criticized for taking a light-hearted approach toward her marriage and her work." In an open letter to the country's leadership shortly before he was expelled from it in 1974, the dissident writer Alexander Solzhenitsyn talked about an alleged heavy burden placed on women to do the menial work in Soviet society: "How can one fail to feel shame and compassion at the sight of our women carrying heavy barrows of stones for paving the street?"

Smith wrote that many women he talked to complained that their emancipation had in fact been exploitation, since economic circumstances effectively compelled them to work while they retained their domestic responsibilities at home, and they were often tired; and that in contrast to Western women, Soviet women regularly saw their idea of liberation as working less and having more opportunity to stay at home. He recounted a popular joke:

Under capitalism, women are not liberated because they have no opportunity to work. They have to stay at home, go shopping, do the cooking, keep house and take care of the children. But under socialism, women are liberated. They have the opportunity to work all day and then go home, go shopping, do the cooking, keep house and take care of the children.

In addition, as Soviet feminist, Ekaterina Alexandrova wrote in her article "Why Soviet Women Want to Get Married".

...Soviet women work at the most varied jobs, and many of them are well educated, have a profession, and are financially independent of men. And yet, in this very society among these very women, a patriarchal social order and its psychology thrive.

Sexist attitudes still prevailed across Soviet society. Men in the leadership often did not take women or their ideas seriously, and excluded them from many discussions. Yet, sociological studies at the time found that Soviet women tended not to see their inequality as a problem.

== Glasnost and post-Soviet Russia ==
In the mid-1980s Mikhail Gorbachev instituted glasnost, allowing greater freedom of speech and organization than ever before in the USSR. This openness generated a burst in women's political action, academic research, and artistic and business ventures. Additionally, women were aware that the new government would offer little assistance with their economic and social struggles. Citizens of the Soviet Union could file complaints and receive redress through the Communist Party, but the post-Soviet government had not developed systems of state recourse. Women began to form their own networks of resource sharing and emotional support, which sometimes developed into grassroots organizations.

During glasnost and after the fall of the Soviet Union, feminist circles began to emerge among intelligentsia women in major cultural centers like Moscow and St. Petersburg. In the 1990s, Russian women were hesitant to use the term "feminist" to describe themselves, because they believed it to have negative connotations throughout Russian history, and especially after the Revolution, when it was equated with the "proletariat" woman who only cares for her career, not her family. Russian women's activism in the 1990s was not explicitly feminist; women attempted to improve their financial and social conditions through any practical means. From this struggle emerged female communities which empowered many women to assert themselves in their pursuit of work, equitable treatment and political voice.

Political and economic transformation in post-Soviet Russia caused deep economic decline in the 1990s and particular financial struggles for women. Although many held jobs, women were also expected to be homemakers. Soviet working women often received extensive employment benefits, such as long child-care leaves, which pushed women into the role of housewife. In the 1990s domestic work grew increasingly demanding as acquiring goods became more time-consuming in the restructured economy. Women's benefits also made them less attractive employees, and during privatization many companies fired women. While 90% of women were in the labor market in the 1980s, by 1991 women made up 70–80% of unemployed Russians. Those jobs available to women in the 1990s were often in low-wage sectors, and many job descriptions specified that only young, attractive women need apply. Employed women often received significantly less pay than men doing the same work.

== 21st century ==
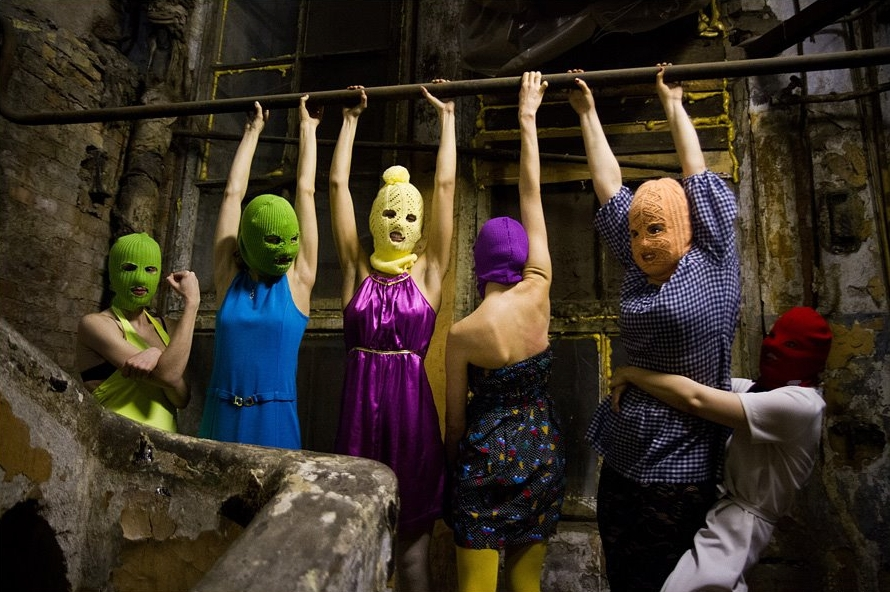
Members of Pussy Riot, a feminist Russian punk rock band

In 2003, 43 percent of local administrators in St. Petersburg were women.

In 2012, the feminist punk rock band Pussy Riot performed publicity stunts to show their opposition to Vladimir Putin, and have faced criticism from the Russian Orthodox Church and the Putin administration. Three members of the group were arrested in March 2012 after performing a "punk-prayer" against Putin in the Cathedral of Christ the Saviour in Moscow. During their trial for hooliganism, they talked about being feminists and stated that this was not incompatible with Russian Orthodoxy. However, Larisa Pavlova, the lawyer representing the Church, insisted this view "does not correspond with reality" and called feminism a "mortal sin".

In 2022, Feminist Anti-War Resistance launched itself with a manifesto opposing the Russian invasion of Ukraine, and organizing a symbolic laying of flowers at Soviet war memorials on International Women's Day.

== See also ==
- Gender roles in post-communist Central and Eastern Europe
- Women in Russia
- Alexandra Kollontai – Russian feminist politician in the Soviet Union
- Olgerta Kharitonova – Russian feminist author and magazine editor.
