= Filosofov =

Filosofov (feminine: Filosofova) (Russian: Философов) is a Russian surname of two possible origins. One is the Russian noble Filosofov family allegedly deriving its lineage from a 10th-century Marko Philosoph (Russian: Марк Христофорос "Философ" Македонин). Another suggestion is that it may be an artificial Russian surname originated in clergy given to a diligent theological student, from φιλόσοφος, "wisdom lover".

Notable people with the surname include:

- Anna Filosofova (1837–1912), Russian feminist and activist
- Dmitry Filosofov (1872–1940), Russian author, literary critic, newspaper editor and political activist
