= Russian grassroots women's organizations =

Russian women's grassroots organizations were organizations formed by women during glasnost and the post-Soviet era in Russia. Eschewing an overtly feminist agenda, these organizations focused on providing better economic support and social services for women in Russia, and lobbied for awareness on women's issues. The organizations differed in their tactics, with some more dedicated to political action than others, but they shared a reluctance to uproot traditional gender norms.

== History ==
In the mid-1980s Mikhail Gorbachev instituted glasnost, allowing greater freedom of speech and organization than ever before in the USSR. This openness generated a burst in women's political action, academic research, and artistic and business ventures. Additionally, women were aware that the new government would offer little assistance with their economic and social struggles. Citizens of the Soviet Union could file complaints and receive redress through the Communist Party, but the post-Soviet government had not developed systems of state recourse. Women began to form their own networks of resource sharing and emotional support, which sometimes developed into grassroots organizations.

== Focus and tactics ==
Russian women's grassroots organizations in the 1990s took a variety of forms, focusing on academic study, self-help, raising public awareness, political lobbying, professional development and economic issues. Some organizations had very specific aims, while others intended mainly to provide an empathic, supportive women's community.

Many groups organized around a particular issue, such as the Committee of Soldiers' Mothers of Russia, which advocated for and educated concerning the rights of soldiers and their families. Some organizations formed around particular constituents, such as Tol'ko Mama, a single mothers' support organization, and Aviatrisa, which opposed professional barriers for female aviators. Russian grassroots women's organizations shared a commitment to making practical improvements in the lives of women.

The tactics and activities of post-Soviet women's organizations depended on each group's focus and goals. A number engaged in political work, staging protests and directly lobbying representatives. Russian women's organizations presented representatives with petitions, educational materials and proposed amendments to legislative bills. As incentive, they sometimes campaigned for politicians who backed policies that they supported. Some organizations educated women on their civil rights and provided free legal advice, empowering women through legal agency. Taruskoe Ob'edinenie Zhenshchin (Association of Women of Tarusa) combated judiciary corruption by gathering many women in court during a woman's hearing, demonstrating that discrimination would be noticed and protested.

Many women wanted to avoid overtly political tactics. Some organizations acquired monetary and material aid to distribute among members. Several groups launched commercial ventures and job-creation schemes, such as a garment-manufacturing business that allowed disabled women to work from home, to support their organization and constituents. Some economically focused groups, such as Klub Zhenskikh Initsiativ (Club for Women's Initiative) provided members with lists of job openings, skill-training workshops, assistance with job applications and counseling on assertiveness and confidence. Community-focused organizations offered crisis support and created spaces for women seeking refuge, information, and connection.

Organizations hosted workshops, themed social events and lectures on issues of concern to women. They published writings on conditions facing Russian women, in Western or academic journals. Some groups publicized through newspapers, television and radio, but many women distrusted the media. Material written about and by women was rarely published in mainstream media. While censorship had eased by the 1990s, women were aware that editors, who were mostly men, retained tight control over media content. Because women, particularly feminists, were often objectified or negatively portrayed in the media, women had well-founded concerns that editors would distort the material they submitted to reflect negatively on their work. For many organizations, media was crucial to recruitment and consciousness-raising and critical for political leverage, so some groups assigned members to focus expressly on crafting press releases and media strategies.

== Funding, fate, and ideological differences ==
All of this work occurred despite a perpetual lack of resources. The Russian government did not offer funding for women’s organizations, so women devoted significant energy to seeking office space, equipment and money for salaries. Typically, members volunteered their time and homes, but this could be unsustainable for organizations that were, by nature, populated by women facing financial struggles. A lack of funding led to the dissolution of some organizations.

The funding that was available came from international women's funding organizations. This money kept many Russian women's organizations running, but it also caused dissension among groups. Western organizations expected their recipients to pursue Western feminist aims, which seemed irrelevant to many Russian women. To receive international funding, Russian organizations adopted Western feminist language, which bred resentment and allegations of elitism made by the unfunded women's organizations. Funded organizations often inadvertently excluded unpaid activists from their conferences and initiatives. As a result, funding issues could prevent cooperation between women’s organizations.

The goals of Western funders and Russian recipients conflicted because the majority of Russian grassroots women's organizations did not have explicitly feminist aims. Most Russian women associated feminism with Western privilege and, with the exception of those in contact with international funders, seldom used terms such as "discrimination, women's rights, or inequality." Some women's organizations even saw equal gender treatment as a violation of the inherent differences between men and women. Even those who did consider themselves feminists, focused primarily on the immediate issues facing women and believed that "pursuing these would be the only means of subsequently convincing members of the value of concepts like equal rights and opportunities." Grassroots organizations concentrated on making improvements in women's lives, not uprooting societal conceptions of gender. For example, it did not bother most Russian women to pursue better conditions via a husband's wage. Careful not to foist a particular brand of emancipation on all women, Russian women's organizations fought less against mainstream views of women and more for women’s freedom of choice.

Though feminism, as defined by the Western tradition, was not their goal, the actions that Russian women took to support themselves and one another often challenged conventional notions of gender and promoted gender equality. By assertively pursuing jobs, demanding acknowledgment for their marketable skills and advocating for state support, women demonstrated traits, such as management, independent decision making, leadership, strategic thinking, that challenged traditional views of Russian women as modest and family-oriented. Russian culture maintained a very clear, restricted definition of femininity, which did not include political organizing or asserting oneself outside the home. Until women joined grassroots organizations, many saw the impulse to make change as a personal deficiency; whether "feminist" or not, grassroots organizations showed many women that they were not alone in the pursuit of empowerment in a patriarchal society.
