= Women in Russia =

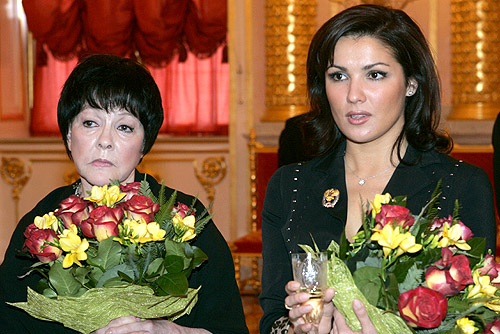
- The poet Bella Akhmadulina (to the left) and Anna Netrebko

General statistics
- Maternal mortality (per 100,000): 34 (2010)
- Women in parliament: 16% (2017)
- Women over 25 with secondary education: 93.5% (2010)
- Women in labour force: 66.1% employment rate, data from OECD, 2018

Gender Inequality Index
- Value: 0.203 (2021)
- Rank: 50th out of 191

Global Gender Gap Index
- Value: 0.706 (2020)
- Rank: 81st

Women in Russia have had a rich and varied history during numerous regimes over the centuries. Since Russian society is multicultural, the experiences of women in Russia vary significantly across ethnic, religious, and social lines. The life of an ethnic Russian woman can be dramatically different from the life of women in minority groups like the Bashkirs, and the life of a woman from a lower-class rural family can be different from the life of a woman from an upper-middle-class urban family. Nevertheless, a common historical and political context provides a framework for speaking about women in Russia in general.

== History ==
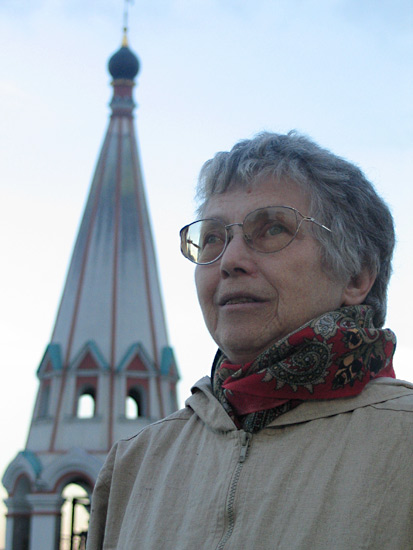
Natalya Gorbanevskaya in Moscow, 2005.

Archaeological evidence suggests that the present day territory of Russia was inhabited since prehistoric times: 1.5-million-year-old Oldowan flint tools were discovered in the Dagestan Akusha region of the North Caucasus, demonstrating the presence of early humans in Russia from a very early time. The direct ancestors of Russians are the Eastern Slavs and the Finnic peoples. For most of the 20th century, the history of Russia is essentially that of the Soviet Union. Its fall in 1991 led, as in most of the former communist bloc countries of Eastern Europe, to an economic collapse and other social problems.

Women in Russia are not a monolithic group, because the country itself is very diverse: there are almost 200 national/ethnic groups in Russia (77.7% being Russians - as of 2010), and although most of the population is (at least nominally) Christian Orthodox, other religions are present too, such as Islam (approximately 6% - see Islam in Russia).

Famous women in Russian history include Anna of Russia, Elizabeth of Russia, Catherine the Great, and Yekaterina Vorontsova-Dashkova.

=== Eighteenth century ===
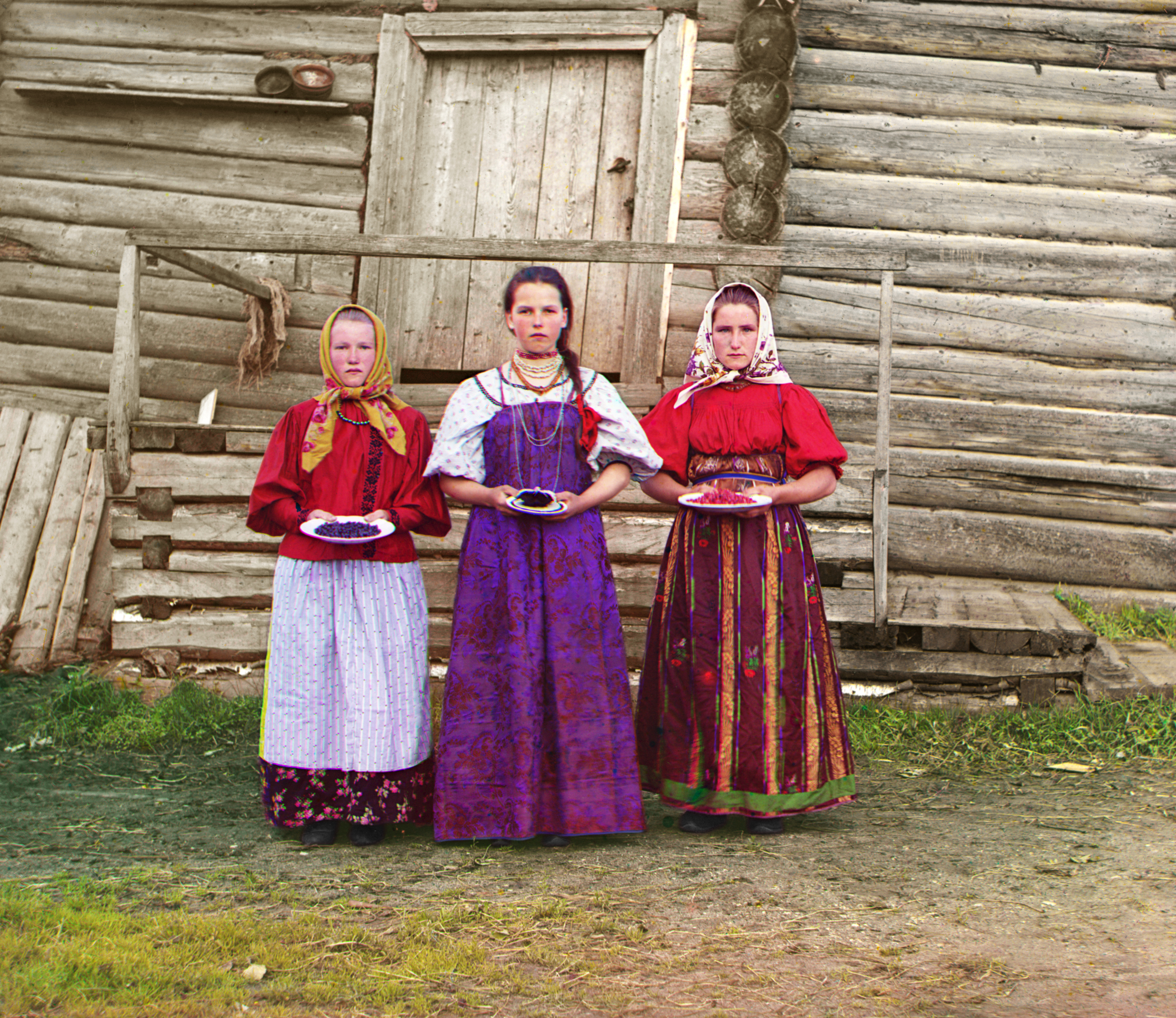
Young women offer berries to visitors to their izba home, 1909. Photograph by Sergey Prokudin-Gorsky.

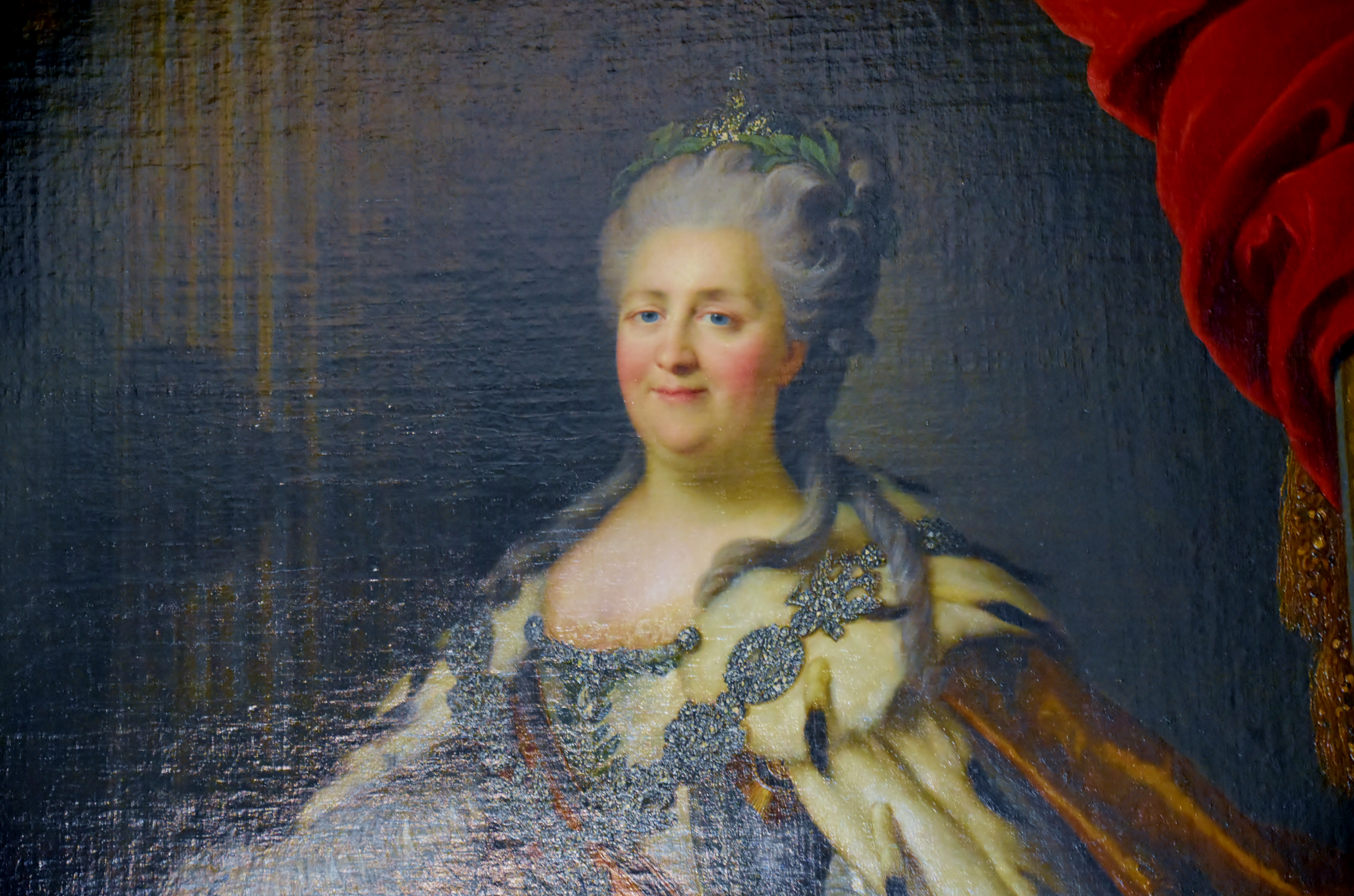
A portrait of Catherine the Great, located inside the State Hermitage Museum which she founded in St. Petersburg.

Women of eighteenth-century Russia were luckier than their European counterparts in some ways; in others, the life of a Russian woman was more difficult. The eighteenth-century was a time of social and legal changes that began to affect women in a way that they had never before experienced. Peter the Great ruled Russia from 1682 to 1725 and in that time brought about many changes to Russian culture, altering the Orthodox traditions that had been observed since the fall of the Byzantine Empire in the 1450s. The three major social classes present during these reforms experienced changes in varying degrees according to their proximity to the tsar and urban settings where reforms could be more strictly enforced. Large cities underwent the westernization process more rapidly and successfully than the outlying rural villages. Noblewomen, merchant class women, and peasant (serf) women each witnessed Petrine reforms differently. For the lower classes it was not until the end of the eighteenth-century (during the time of Catherine the Great's reign) that they began to see any changes at all. When these reforms did begin to change women's lives legally, they also helped to expand their abilities socially. The Petrine reforms of this century allowed for more female participation in society, when before they were limited to roles as wives and mothers. “The change in women's place in Russian society can be illustrated no better than by the fact that five women ruled the empire, in their own names, for a total of seventy years.”

==== Legal changes ====
Arguably the most important legal change that affected women's lives was the Law of Single Inheritance instituted by Peter the Great in 1714. The law was supposed to help the tax revenue for Russia by banning the allowance of noble families to divide their land and wealth among multiple children. This law effectively ended the practice of excluding women from inheriting patrimonial estates. The Law of Single Inheritance was clarified in the decree of 1725. It sought to address the question of married daughter’ inheritance rights. The law mandated that if a man was survived by unmarried daughters, the eldest daughter would inherit his estate, while the remaining sisters would divide his movable property. His married daughters would receive nothing, however, since they would have received dowries at the time they married.

In 1730 Anna Ivanova revoked the Law of Single Inheritance, as it had been a major point of contestation among the nobility since Peter first announced it in 1714. After 1731, property rights were expanded to include inheritance in land property. Women also gained greater power over the estates that had been willed to them, or received in their wedding dowry.

==== Education for women ====
In pre-Petrine centuries the Russian tsars had always been concerned with educating their people, neither the wealthy nor the serfs. Education reforms were a large part of Petrine Westernization; however, it was not until Catherine II's reforms that education rights applied to both men and women of each class. Education for girls occurred mainly in the home because they were focused on learning about their duties as wife and mother rather than getting a full education. “The provision of formal education for women began only in 1764 and 1765, when Catherine II established first the Smolny Institute for girls of the nobility in St. Petersburg and then the Novodevichii Institute for the daughters of commoners.”

==== Women in the nobility ====
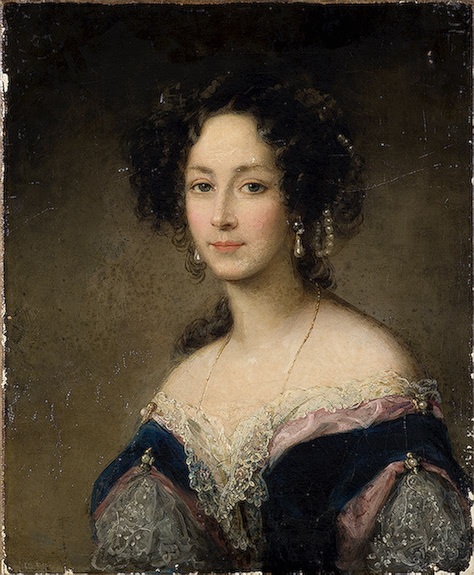
Zinaida Ivanovna Yusupova in 1840

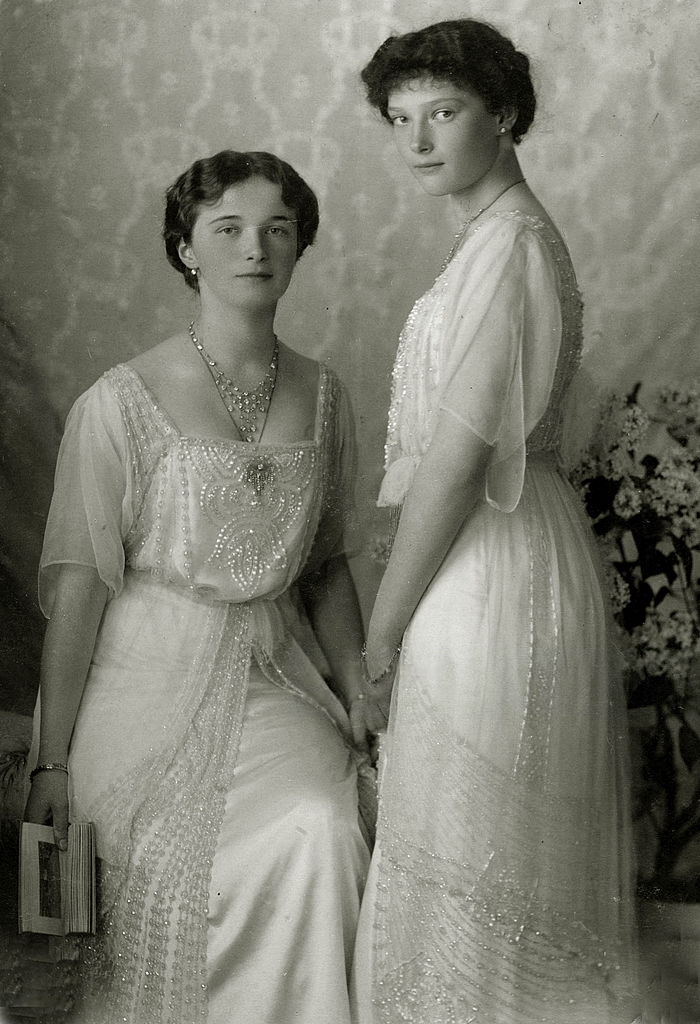
Grand Duchess Olga Nikolaevna and Grand Duchess Tatiana Nikolaevna in 1913

In the eighteenth-century Petrine reforms and enlightenment ideas brought both welcome and unwelcome changes required of the Russian nobility and aristocratic families. Daughters in well-to-do families were raised in the terem, which was usually a separate building connected to the house by an outside passageway. The terem was used to isolate girls of marriageable age and was intended to keep them "pure" (sexually inexperienced). These girls were raised solely on the prospect of marrying to connect their own family to another aristocratic family. Many rural and urban lower class houses had no space to separate young women so there was no designated terem to keep them isolated. Women of lower classes lived and worked with their brothers, fathers, and ultimately, husbands, as well as manage all household matters along with them. Marriage customs changed gradually with the new reforms instituted by Peter the Great; the average marriageable age increased, especially in the cities among the wealthier tier of people closest to the tsar and in the public eye. “By the end of the eighteenth-century, brides in cities were usually fifteen to eighteen years old, and even in villages young marriages were becoming more and more rare.” Marriage laws were a significant aspect of the Petrine reforms, but had to be corrected or clarified by later tsars because of their frequent ambiguities. In 1753, a decree was issued to assure that noble families could secure their daughter's inheritance of land by making it a part of the dowry that she would have access to once she was married. The Petrine reforms precipitated a number of changes that could be confusing to navigate. Family as well as marriage disputes often went to the court system because of the confusion about the dowry, and the rights it was supposed to ensure, in the event of a father's death or in disputed divorces. For women, the right to own and sell property was a new experience that only came about because of Russia's gradual westernization in the eighteenth century.

==== Women in the merchant class ====
Merchant class women also enjoyed newly granted freedoms to own property and manage it; with this new right, upper-class women gained more independence from their patriarchal restrictions. Wives of merchant class men had more independence than wives of the nobility or peasants because of the nature of their husband's work, especially when their husbands were away from home on government service, as they were frequently and for long periods of time. The rights of married women from the nobility and merchantry to own and manage their own property offered them an opportunity to become involved in commercial and manufacturing ventures.

==== Women in the peasantry ====
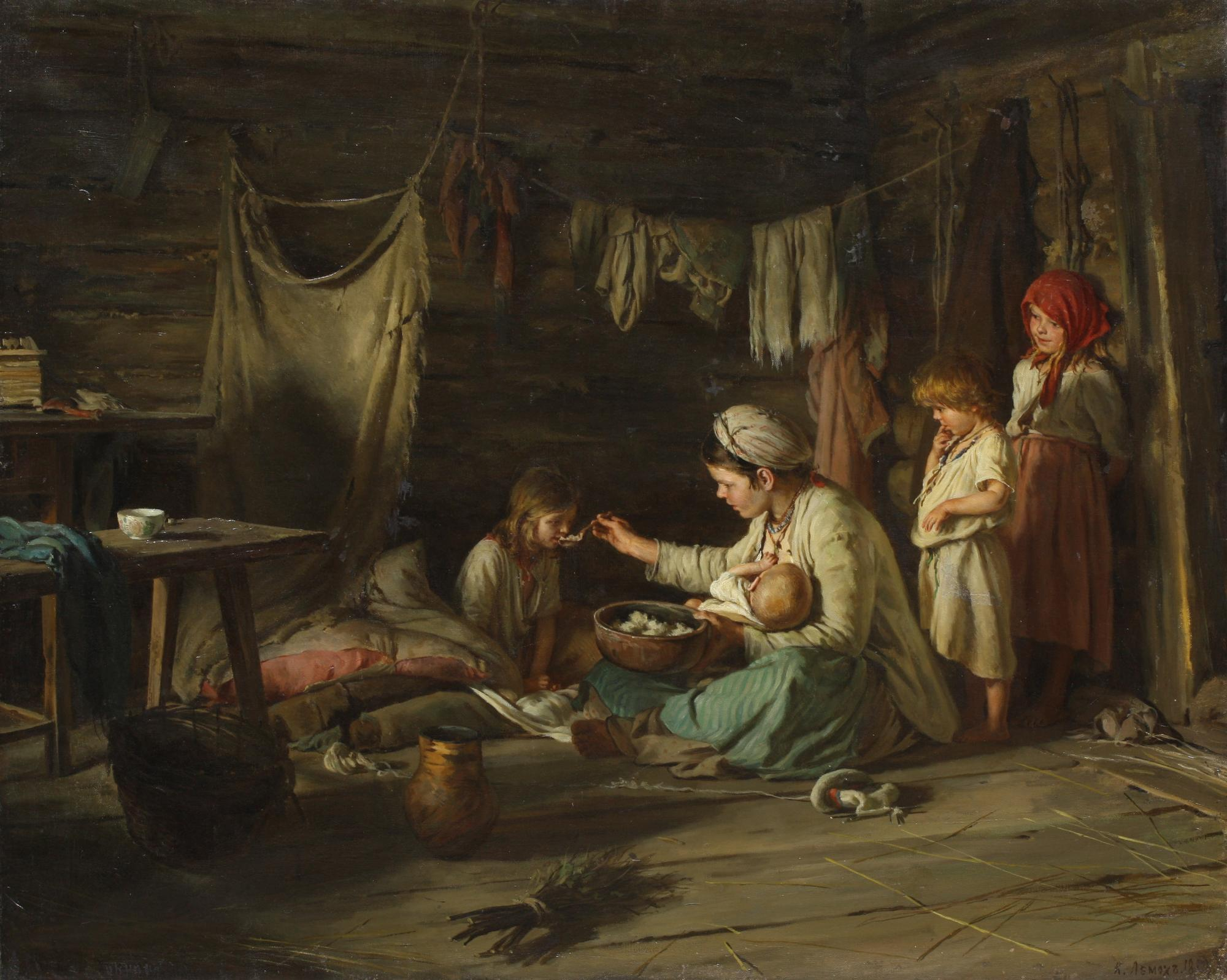
Russian peasant woman and her children, 1889

A life among the peasant class was hard whether that peasant was male or female; each led lives filled with strenuous labor. They participated in work in the fields and in the making of handicrafts. Women were expected to do domestic work such as cooking, weaving clothes, and cleaning for their families. During planting and harvest time, when help was needed in the fields, women worked with their husbands to plow, sow seeds, then collect and prepare the crops. Early in the eighteenth-century, the average age for peasant girls to marry was around twelve years old. At this time they were still learning what would be expected of them as wives and also needed their parent's consent to marry. “The requirement of the law code of 1649 that girls not marry before the age of fifteen was rarely observed.” Various permissions for marriage were required; widows and unmarried women living on government owned property had to obtain the permission of the village assembly before they could marry anyone. Young peasant women (like other Russian women) spent far more of their child-bearing years as married women than their counterparts in Western Europe did. Childbirth was dangerous for both mother and child in the eighteenth-century but if a peasant woman was able to, she could potentially give birth, on average, to seven children. In the harsh climate of the Russian steppe, and a life of labor from an early age, perhaps half of all children would live to adulthood. “The birth of her first child, preferably a son, established her position in her husband's household. As she continued to bear sons, her status further improved.” Russian peasant families needed help in the fields and to manage the household; not being able to hire anyone for these tasks, children were the only way to get the help they needed. Having a son ensured that the family name would continue as well as any property they might own, though as Petrine reforms came into effect, it began to be equally profitable to have a girl. However, women of any class could turn infrequently to the ecclesiastical courts to resolve their marital conflicts.

=== 1850 to 1917 ===
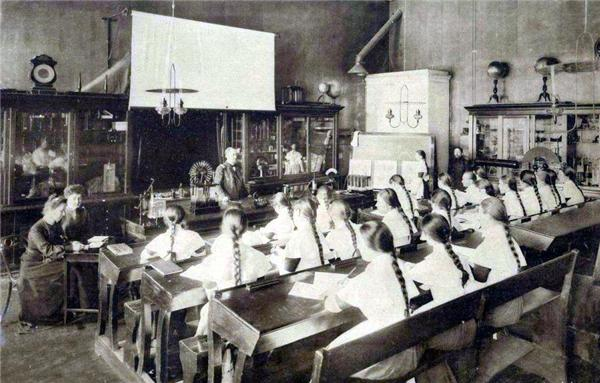
A lesson at Smolny Institute school for girls, 1913-1914

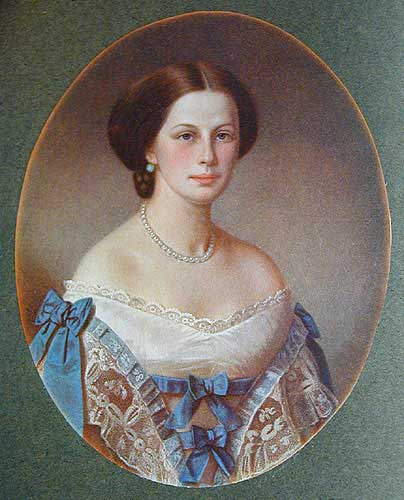
Anna Filosofova

By the mid-nineteenth century, West European notions of equality were starting to take hold in Russia. In 1859, Saint Petersburg Imperial University allowed women to audit its courses, but the policy was revoked just four years later. In the 1860s in Saint Petersburg, a feminist movement began to coalesce, led by Anna Filosofova (1837–1912), Nadezhda Stasova (1835–1895), and Mariia Trubnikova (1835–1897), together known as the "triumvirate". Along with members of the Saint-Petersburg literati, such as Evgenia Konradi (1838–1898), they petitioned universities to educate women and wrote to prominent male figures to support their cause. This group also founded organizations to help unattached women become financially self-sufficient, and in 1878 they helped to establish the Bestuzhev Courses, which for the first time gave Russia's women reliable access to higher education. By the early 1900s Russia boasted more female doctors, lawyers, and teachers than almost any country in Europe—a fact noted with admiration by many foreign visitors. However, most educational benefits were reaped by urban women from the middle and upper classes. While literacy rates were slowly growing throughout the Russian Empire, educational and other opportunities for peasant remained relatively few. Their main role was to have children.

In 1910 Poliksena Shishkina-Iavein (1875–1947), the first female gynecologist in Russia, became president of the Russian League for Women's Rights. The League made universal women's suffrage its primary goal, and under Shishkina-Iavein's leadership the women's suffrage movement gained a great deal of popular support, both in Russia and abroad. In March 1917 the Provisional Government, which had replaced Emperor Nicholas II's autocracy, granted Russia's women the right to vote and to hold political office. It was the first such reform enacted by a major political power.

=== Soviet era: feminist reforms ===
The Constitution of the USSR guaranteed equality for women - "Women in the USSR are accorded equal rights with men in all spheres of economic, state, cultural, social, and political life." (Article 122).

During the 70 years of the Soviet era, women's roles were complex. Women in Soviet Russia became a vital part of the mobilization into the work force, and this opening of women into sectors that were previously unattainable allowed opportunities for education, personal development, and training. The responsibilities of the ideal industrial Soviet woman meant that she matched working quotas, never complained, and did everything for the betterment of Soviet Russia. These expectations came in addition to the standards demanded of women in the domestic sphere.

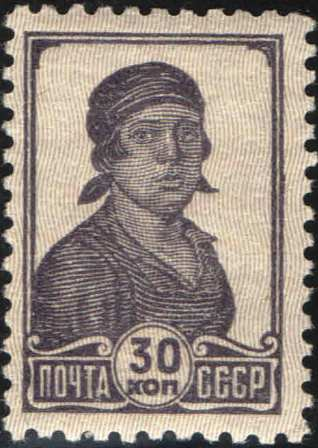
Female worker on a 1930 stamp. Socialist realist art glorified ordinary workers, and women were often not depicted in a traditionally feminine manner.

The Russian Revolution of 1917 established legal equality of women and men. Lenin saw women as a force of labor that had previously been untapped; he encouraged women to participate in the communist revolution. He stated: "Petty housework crushes, strangles, stultifies and degrades [the woman], chains her to the kitchen and to the nursery, and wastes her labor on barbarously unproductive, petty, nerve-racking, stultifying and crushing drudgery." Bolshevik doctrine aimed to free women economically from men, and this meant allowing women to enter the workforce. The number of women who entered the workforce rose from 423,200 in 1923 to 885,000 in 1930.

To achieve this increase of women in the workforce, the new communist government issued the first Family Code in October 1918. This code separated marriage from the church, allowed a couple to choose a surname, gave illegitimate children the same rights as legitimate children, gave rights to maternal entitlements, health and safety protections at work, and provided women with the right to a divorce on extended grounds. In 1920 the Soviet government legalized abortion. In 1922 marital rape was made illegal in the Soviet Union. Labor laws also assisted women. Women were given equal rights in regard to insurance in case of illness, eight-week paid maternity-leave, and a minimum wage standard that was set for both men and women. Both sexes were also afforded paid holiday-leave. The Soviet government enacted these measures in order to produce a quality labor-force from both of the sexes. While the reality was that not all women were granted these rights, they established a pivot from the traditional systems of the Russian imperialist past.

To oversee this code and women's freedoms, the All-Russian Communist Party (bolsheviks) set up a specialist women's department, the Zhenotdel in 1919. The department produced propaganda encouraging more women to become a part of the urban population and of the communist revolutionary party. The 1920s saw changes in the urban centers of family policy, sexuality, and women's political activism. The creation of the "new soviet woman", who would be self-sacrificing and dedicated to the revolutionary cause, paved the way for the expectation of women to come. In 1925, with the number of divorces increasing, the Zhenotdel created the second family plan, proposing a common-law marriage for couples that were living together. However, a year later, the government passed a marriage law as a reaction to the de facto marriages that were causing inequality for women. As a result of the policy implementation of the New Economic Policy (NEP) of 1921–1928, if a man left his de facto wife, she was left unable to secure assistance. Men had no legal ties and as such, if a woman got pregnant, he would be able to leave, and not be legally responsible to assist the woman or child; this led to an increase in the number of homeless children. Because a de facto wife enjoyed no rights, the government sought to resolve this through the 1926 marriage law, granting registered and unregistered marriages equal rights and emphasized the obligations that came with marriage. The Bolsheviks also established "women's soviets" (Russian: женсоветы, romanized: zhensoviety - singular: Russian: женсовет, romanized: zhensoviet) to cater for and support women.

In 1930 the Zhenotdel disbanded, as the government claimed that their work was completed. Women began to enter the Soviet workforce on a scale never seen before. However, in the mid-1930s there was a return to more traditional and conservative values in many areas of social and family policy. Abortion became illegal, homosexuality was declared a crime, legal differences between legitimate and illegitimate children were restored, and divorce once again became difficult to attain. Women became the heroines of the home and made sacrifices for their husbands and were to create a positive life at home that would "increase productivity and improve quality of work". The 1940s continued the traditional ideology - the nuclear family was the driving force of the time. Women held the social responsibility of motherhood that could not be ignored.

Some local women's organizations also existed. For example, a group of Azeri Bolshevik women in the Azerbaijan Soviet Socialist Republic founded (1920) the Ali Bayramov Club, a women's club dedicated to the unveiling of Muslim women, promoting female literacy, giving women opportunities for vocational training and employment, and organizing leisure and cultural events.

During the Stalinist era (1927–1953), women also fell victim to the purges that plagued the country. From 1934 to 1940 the number of women imprisoned in the Gulag system rose from 30,108 to 108,898. Women were not sent to hard-labor camps, but rather worked at camps that were textile- or sewing-factories, and were only forced to perform hard labor as a punishment. Women in the camps were often subjects of violence and/or sexual abuse. At the same time, "Thank you literature" arose as a result of the personality cult that Stalin had implemented, and articles in women's magazines would praise Stalin for the work that he had done for women.

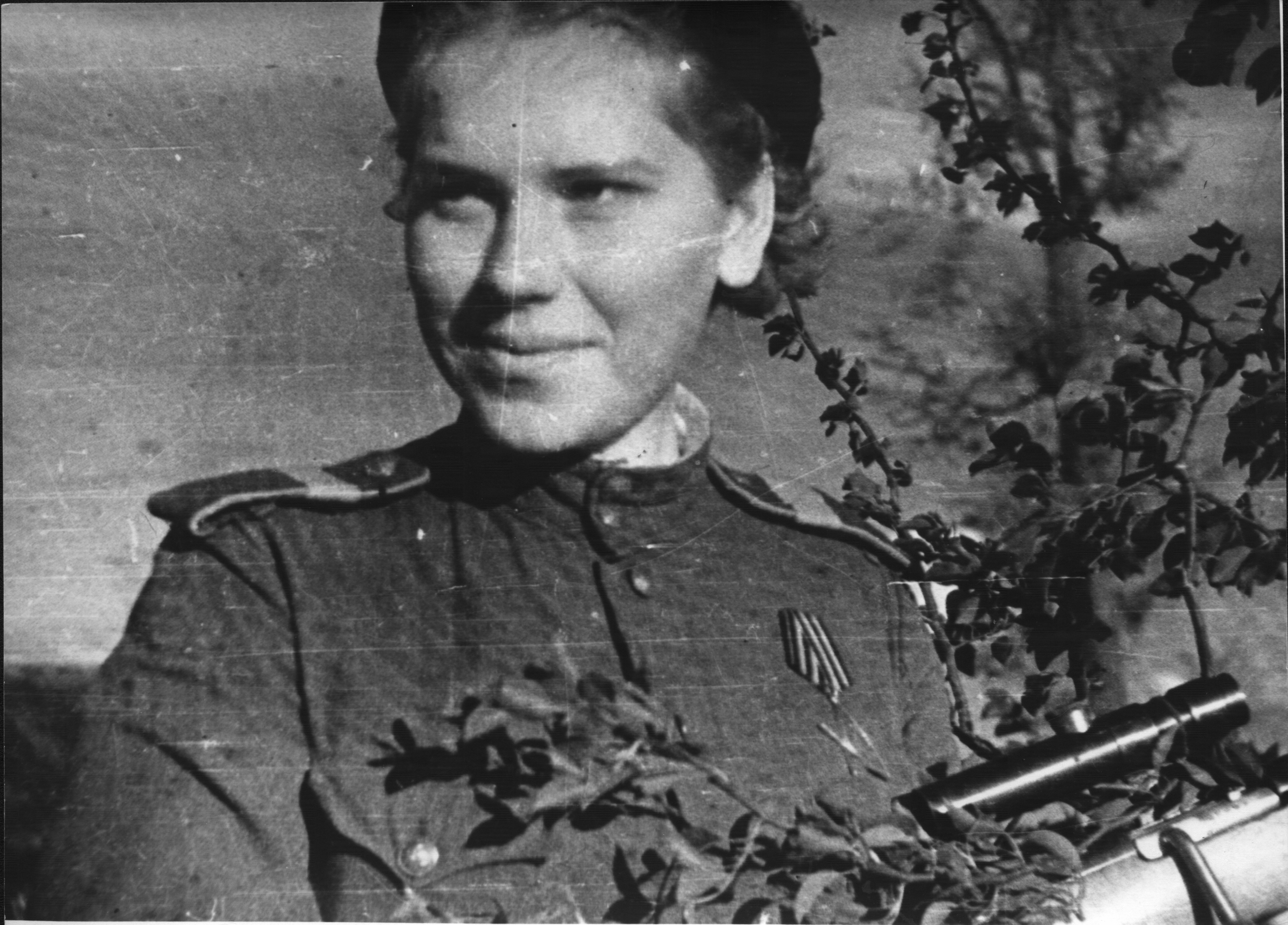
Soviet sniper Roza Shanina in 1944

During the Soviet Union's participation (1941–1945) in World War II, women exemplified the motherland and patriotism. Many became widowed during the war, making them more likely to become impoverished. As men were called away to assist with the fighting, women stepped in - some took charge of state farms and large collective farms. In 1942 women made up over half of the agricultural labor force. Soviet women not only assumed roles in industry and agriculture: 8,476 girls joined the Red Army or the Soviet Navy to assist in the Great Patriotic War. The motto of the time became: "Soviet women gave all their strengthen to the motherland… no difficulties arising on the path to building peace could frighten them."

The Soviet authorities repealed the ban on abortion in 1955 - after almost 20 years of prohibition, abortion became legal again. After Stalin's death in March 1953, the Soviet government revoked the 1936 laws and issued a new law on abortion.

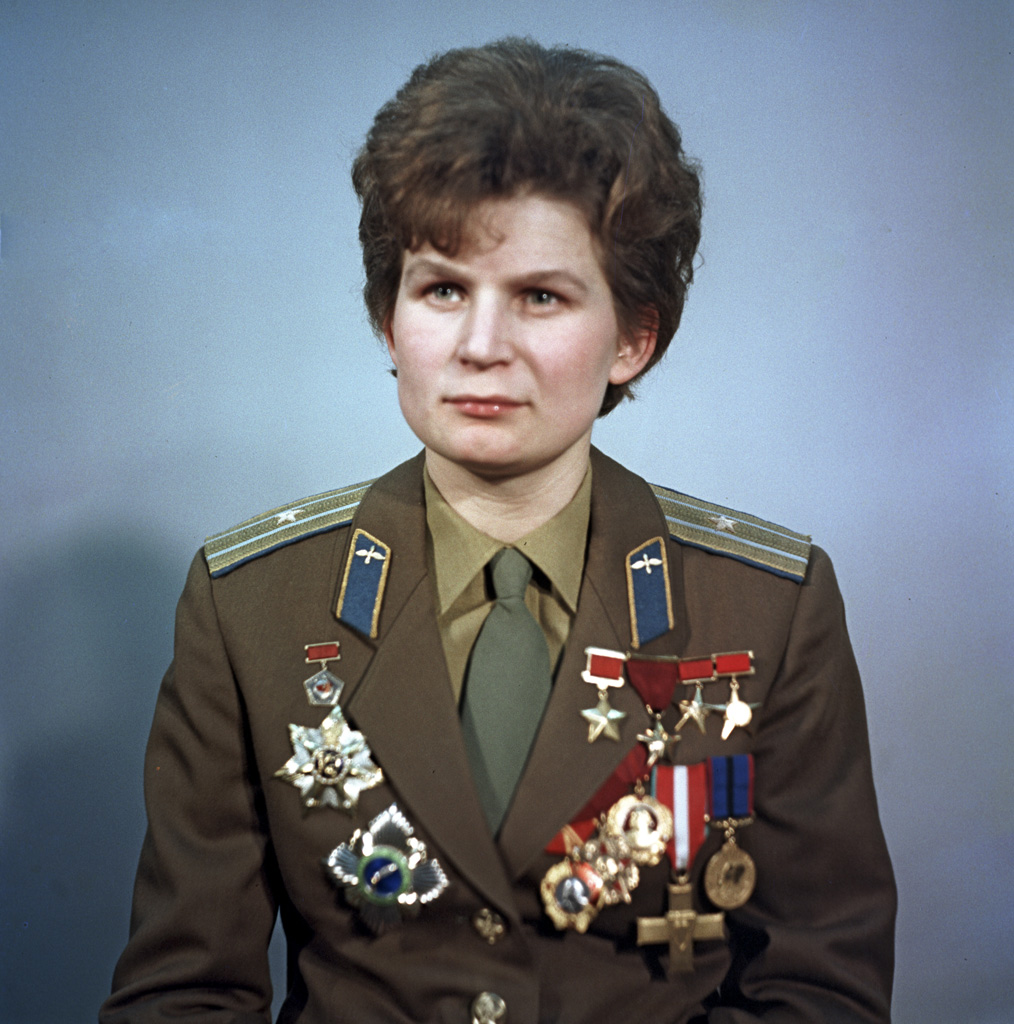
Valentina Tereshkova in 1969

Valentina Vladimirovna Tereshkova (Russian: Валентина Владимировна Терешкова; born 6 March 1937) was the first woman to fly in space, having been selected from more than four-hundred applicants and five finalists to pilot the Vostok 6 mission on 16 June 1963. Before her recruitment as a cosmonaut, Tereshkova was a textile-factory assembly-worker and an amateur skydiver. In order to become a cosmonaut, Tereshkova was only honorarily inducted into the Soviet Air Force, and thus she also became the first civilian to fly in space. During her three-day mission, she performed various tests on herself to collect data on the female body's reaction to spaceflight.

The 1977 Soviet Constitution supported women's rights both in public life (Article 35) and in family life (Article 53). The Constitution made clear the multiple roles of a woman: to educate herself, and to work for the benefit of society, as well as, to be a mother and raise the next generation of Soviet citizens.

=== 1990s ===
Women in post-Soviet Russia lost most of the state benefits that they had enjoyed in the USSR. However, as in the Soviet era, Russian women in the 1990s predominated in economic sectors where pay is low, and they continued to receive less pay than men for comparable positions. In 1995 men in health care earned an average of 50 percent more than women in that field, and male engineers received an average of 40 percent more than their female colleagues. Despite being better educated than men on average, women remained in the minority in senior management positions. In the later Soviet era, women's wages averaged 70 percent of men's; by 1995 the figure was 40 percent, according to the Moscow-based Center for Gender Studies. According to a 1996 report, 87 percent of employed urban Russians earning less than 100,000 rubles a month were women, and the percentage of women decreased consistently in the higher wage-categories.

According to reports, women generally are the first to be fired, and they face other forms of on-the-job discrimination as well. Struggling companies often fire women to avoid paying child-care benefits or granting maternity leave, as the law still requires. In 1995 women constituted an estimated 70 percent of Russia's unemployed, and as much as 90 percent in some areas.

==== Abuse ====
Sociological surveys show that sexual harassment and violence against women increased at all levels of society in the 1990s. More than 13,000 rapes were reported in 1994. In 1993 an estimated 14,000 women were murdered by their husbands or lovers, about twenty times the figure in the United States and several times the figure in Russia five years earlier. More than 300,000 other types of crimes, including spousal abuse, were committed against women in 1994; in 1996 the State Duma (the lower house of the Federal Assembly, Russia's parliament) drafted a law against domestic violence.

==== Women's organizations ====
Independent women's organizations, a form of activity suppressed in the Soviet era, formed in large numbers in the 1990s at the local, regional, and national levels. One such group is the Center for Gender Studies, a private research-institute. The center analyzes demographic and social problems of women and acts as a link between Russian and Western feminist groups. A traveling group called Feminist Alternative offers women assertiveness training. Many local groups have emerged to engage in court actions on behalf of women, to set up rape and domestic-violence awareness programs (about a dozen of which were active in 1995), and to aid women in establishing businesses. Another prominent organization is the Women's Union of Russia, which focuses on job-training programs, career counseling, and the development of entrepreneurial skills with a view to enabling women to compete more successfully in Russia's emerging market economy. Despite the proliferation of such groups and programs, in the mid-1990s most Russians (including many women) remained contemptuous of their efforts, which many regard as a kind of Western subversion of traditional (Soviet and even pre-Soviet) social values.

==== Employment ====
The ending of Soviet assurance of the right to work caused severe unemployment among both men and women. After the 1991 fall of the USSR, many women who had previously worked as engineers, scientists and teachers, had to resort to prostitution in order to feed themselves and their families. The most frequently-offered job in new businesses is that of sekretarsha (secretary/receptionist), and advertisements for such positions in private-sector companies often specify physical attractiveness as a primary requirement (a condition that is illegal in governmental organizations). Russian law provides for as much as three years' imprisonment for sexual harassment, but the law is rarely enforced. Although the Fund for Protection from Sexual Harassment has blacklisted 300 Moscow firms where sexual harassment is known to have taken place, demands for sex and even rape are still common on-the-job occurrences.

Russian labor law lists 98 occupations that are forbidden to women, as they are considered too dangerous to female health, especially reproductive health (until 2019 the figure was 456).

==== Political participation ====
At the national level, the most notable manifestation of women's newfound political success has been the Women of Russia party, which won 11 percent of the vote and twenty-five seats in the 1993 national parliamentary election. Subsequently, the party became active in a number of issues, including opposition to the military campaign in Chechnya that began in 1994. In the 1995 national parliamentary election the Women of Russia bloc chose to maintain its platform unchanged, emphasizing social issues such as the protection of children and women rather than entering into a coalition with other liberal parties. As a result, the party failed to reach the 5 percent threshold of votes required for proportional representation in the new State Duma, gaining only three seats in the single-seat portion of the elections. The party considered running a candidate in the 1996 presidential election but remained outside the crowded field.

A smaller organization, the Russian Women's Party, ran as part of an unsuccessful coalition with several other splinter-parties in the 1995 elections. A few women, such as Ella Pamfilova of the Republican Party of Russia, Russian Socialist Workers' Party chief Lyudmila Vartazarova, and Valeriya Novodvorskaya, leader of the Democratic Union, established themselves as influential political figures. Pamfilova has gained particular stature as an advocate on behalf of women and elderly people.

==== Soldiers' Mothers Movement ====
The Soldiers' Mothers Movement formed in 1989 to expose human-rights violations in the armed forces and to help youths resist the draft. The movement gained national prominence through its opposition to the 1994-2009 wars in Chechnya . Numerous protests have been organized, and representatives have gone to the Chechen capital, Groznyy, to demand the release of Russian prisoners and to locate missing soldiers. The group, which claimed 10,000 members in 1995, also has lobbied against extending the term of mandatory military service.

==== Government officials ====
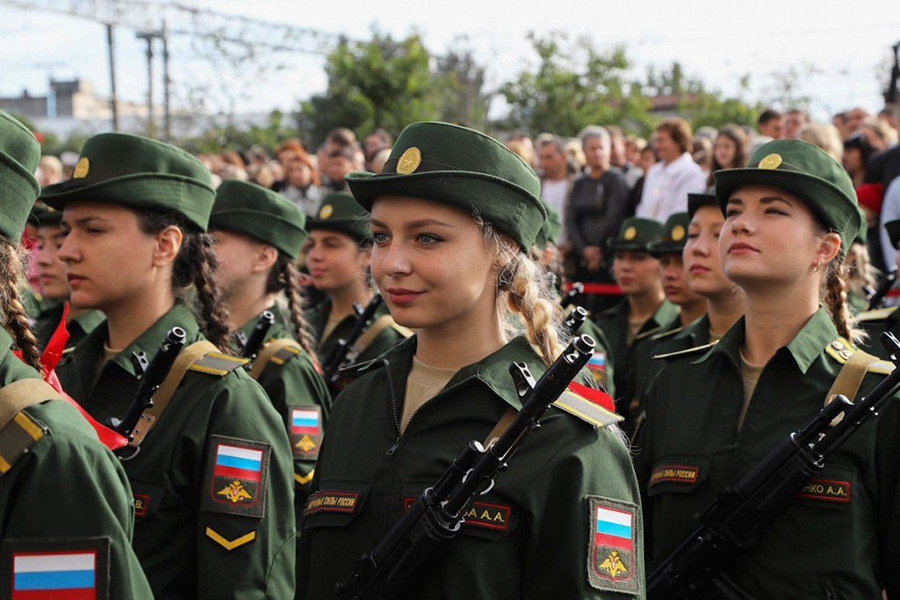
Women in the Russian Armed forces

Women have occupied few positions of influence in the executive branch of Russia's national government. One post in the Government (cabinet), that of Minister of Social Protection, has become a "traditional" women's position; in 1994 Ella Pamfilova was followed in that position by Lyudmila Bezlepkina, who headed the ministry until the end of President Boris Yeltsin's first term in mid-1996. Tat'yana Paramanova was acting chairman of the Russian Central Bank for one year before Yeltsin replaced her in November 1995, and Tat'yana Regent served as head of the Federal Migration Service from its inception in 1992 until 1999. Prior to the 1995 elections, women held about 10 percent of the seats in parliament: fifty-seven of 450 seats in the lower-house State Duma and nine of 178 seats in the upper house of parliament, the Federation Council. The Soviet system of filling legislative seats had generally allocated about one-third of the seats in republic-level legislatures and one-half of the seats in local soviets to women, but those proportions shrank drastically with the first multiparty elections of 1990.

== Contemporary situation ==
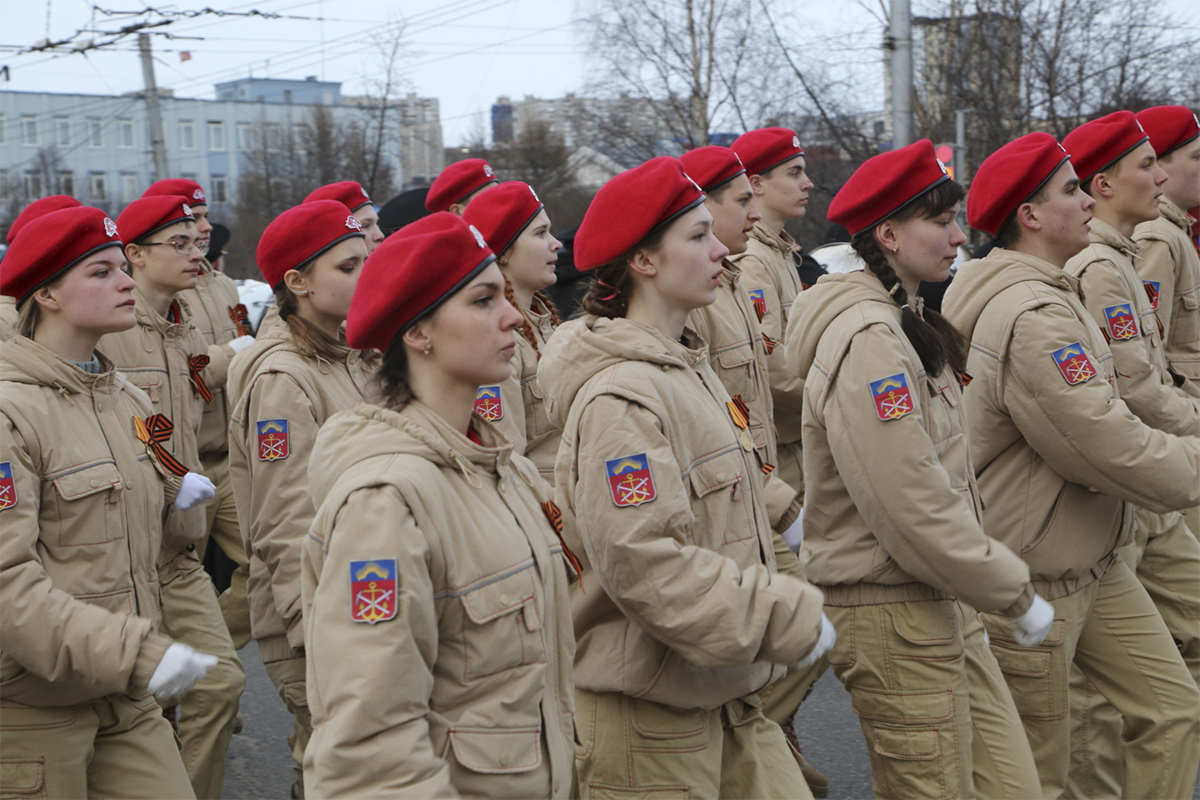
Russian girls in Putin's Young Army in Murmansk, 2018

Article 19 of the 1993 Constitution of Russia guarantees equal rights to women and men. Under the Labour law, women have the right to paid maternity leave, paid parental leave, and unpaid parental leave, that can be extended until the child is 3.

Women now have for generations worked outside the home; dual income families are the most common: the employment rate of women and men is 66.1% and 76.2% respectively (age 15–64, as of 2018). Nevertheless, women often face discrimination in the labour market; and the law itself lists 100 occupations that are forbidden to women, as they are considered too dangerous to their health, especially reproductive health (until 2019 the figure was 456). Despite this, many Russian women have achieved success in business.

The total fertility rate of Russia is 1.61 as of 2015, which, although below replacement rate of 2.1, is still higher than in the 1990s.

During the Russo-Ukrainian war, Russian women served in a frontline assault units.

=== Contemporary situation for female politicians in Russia ===
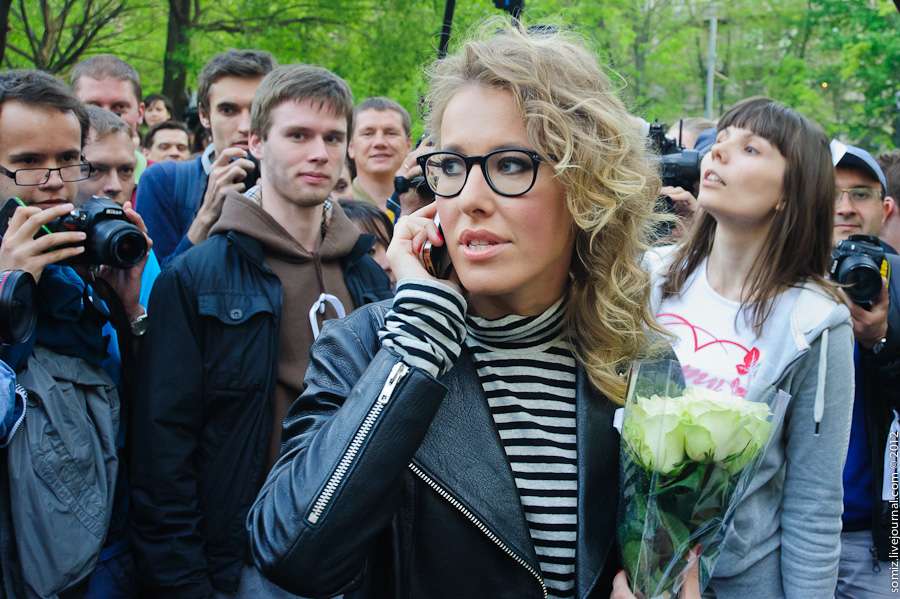
Russian politician Ksenia Sobchak at a demonstration in Moscow in May 2012

In 1999, there were only four (at most) women named as part of the Nezavisimaya gazeta's monthly ranking of influential Russian politicians, the highest-ranking being Tatyana Dyachenko, the daughter of Boris Yeltsin. The number of women in Russian politics has increased; at the federal level, this is partially due to electoral victories by Women of Russia bloc in the Duma. The 1990s saw an increase in female legislators; another notable increase occurred during the 2007 elections, when every major political party increased its number of female candidates. While there has been an increase in the share of women in politics in Russia, this has not led to increased gender equality in Russian society overall. A 2016 study argues that women's descriptive representation in Russian politics will not align with an ability for them to demonstrate substantive representation because female politicians in Russia are "boxed in by informal rules and by parallel institutions and posts, with virtually no opportunities to advocate for women's interests. Furthermore, female politicians are portrayed in Russian media in a very specific manner which further reveals their purpose as silly props, rather than legislators who should be taken seriously by the public. The women of the Duma are frequently photographed putting on makeup on the floor of the legislature, as well as being kissed on the hand by their male counterparts, to name two examples of their gendered portrayal. Putin's regime has promoted women to be “stand ins” during times of crisis or change, “loyalists” and “showgirls” when the regime needs to showcase elections and representation, and “cleaners” when the appearance of corruption threatens the regime." Putin's choice to use female politicians as "cleaners" may reflect the regime's focus on image. Interestingly, political science research shows that female politicians are largely perceived to be less corrupt than their male counterparts (though there is no evidence that this perception reflects the reality of whether gender has any significant impact on a person's likelihood to engage in corrupt behavior).

There is significant modern public sentiment that opposes the presence of women in Russian politics. The findings of a 2017 independent research study reveal a culture "not ready" for female leaders. In 2017, one in three Russians "do not approve of women in the political sphere." In 2016, only twenty percent of respondents felt this way. The same study also concluded that the 2017 response against gender equality among the "high echelons of power" was stronger (38%), comparatively, than in 2016, when only 28% of respondents submitted these sentiments. Furthermore, only 33% of respondents would welcome a female president.

== Decriminalization of domestic violence ==
External videos
- Her husband cut off her hands, now she wants tougher laws -CBC News National

In January 2017, the lower house of the Russian legislature decriminalized first time domestic violence. This applies to first offenses which do not cause serious injury, decreasing from a maximum penalty of two years imprisonment to a maximum of fifteen days in police custody. It became an administrative offense, with the penalty for first offenses falling under the Administrative Code, these usually being fines or suspended sentences if the accused is a family member, which constitutes the vast majority of domestic violence cases. For second offense and beyond, it is considered a criminal offense, prosecuted under the Criminal Code. The move was widely seen as part of a state-sponsored turn to traditional values under Putin and shift away from liberal notions of individual and human rights. President Putin signed the bill into law in February 2017. The Guardian reported in February 2017 that "according to some estimates, one woman dies every 40 minutes from domestic abuse." Human Rights Watch responded extremely critically to this legislation, presenting recommendations to the Russian legislature to reverse course by increasing protections for victims of domestic violence. To substantiate this recommendation, Human Rights Watch cites an independent study which concludes Russian women are three times as likely to encounter violence at the hands of a family member or loved one than a stranger. Furthermore, Human Rights Watch observed that only 3% of domestic violence cases in Russia go to trial, and notes that the 2017 decriminalization makes it even harder to prosecute abusers.

The 2017 decriminalization of domestic violence opposed over two decades of activism in favor of increased penalties for abusers. In 1993, upon the first State Duma, the Women of Russia party drafted a bill against domestic violence; a petition in favor of codifying a stance against such abuse received 884,000 signatories nationwide. A 2012-2016 effort to craft a bill which allowed for victims of domestic violence to file restraining orders against their abusers, as well as fund shelters and "guarantee judicial and psychological help," was ultimately rejected. In 2019, a group of women's rights activists and female politicians, including Vice-Speaker of Russia's Federation Council Galina Karelova, promoted another bill against domestic violence. Ultimately, this effort was rejected as well, most notably by the Russian Orthodox Church, whose "Patriarchal Commission on the Family and Protection of Motherhood and Childhood" lobbied against the bill, labeling it "anti-family" and "reducing the rights and freedoms of people who have chosen a familial way of life and birth and the raising of children." The commission further claims that the bill "unjustly overburdens families and parents" and "introduces punishment for family life." Protesters want to keep government interference away from the home, however, a study by St. Petersburg State University finds that 90% of domestic violence cases take place within the home, and that 85-91% of victims of marital violence are women.

Lockdowns due to the COVID-19 pandemic trapped many women at home with their abusers. Russia initially denied a spike in domestic violence, despite national domestic violence organizations reporting their inability to keep up with a steep increase in calls from victims. Women were fined for breaking quarantine in order to escape their abusers until May 2020, when the government finally declared domestic violence an emergency in which breaking quarantine was acceptable. In March 2020, Putin signed a bill increasing the severity of punishments for breaking quarantine, which include fines up to US$640 (more for companies and public officials). If their actions caused others health issues or even death, those who break quarantine would receive a minimum of 5-7 extra years in prison and fines worth up to US$4,800. Meanwhile, under Russia's domestic violence legislation, only abuse that results in a victim's hospitalization is criminal; first-time offenders are punished with a fine worth merely US$88.

== Sports ==
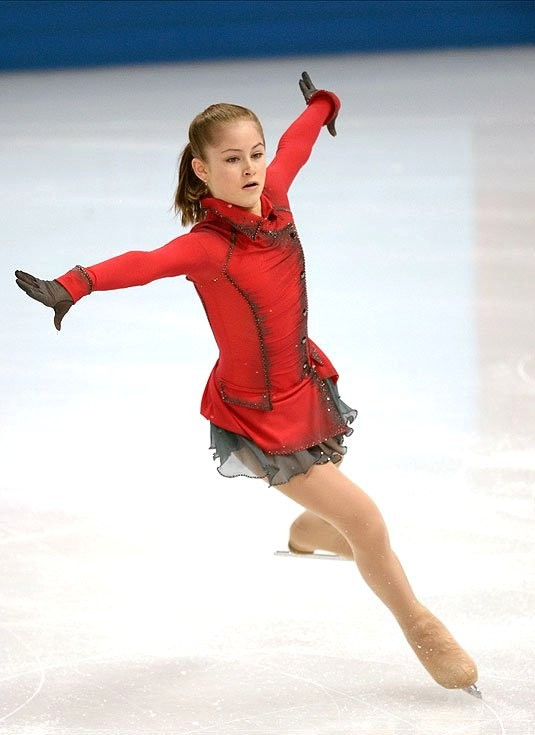
Julia Lipnitskaia

Russia has a long history of successful female skaters and gymnasts. Figure skating is a popular sport; in the 1960s the Soviet Union rose to become a dominant power in figure skating, especially in pairs skating and ice dancing; and this continued even after the fall the USSR. Artistic Gymnastics are among Russia's most popular sports; Svetlana Khorkina is one of the most successful female gymnasts of all time. One of the most famous tennis players is Maria Sharapova who became the No. 1 tennis player in the world at only the age of 18. Russian women are also internationally successful in many other sports, such as athletics, basketball, tennis and volleyball.

== Human trafficking ==
As in other former communist countries, the fall of the state planned economy after the collapse of the USSR, led to increased socioeconomic problems, such as unemployment, insecurity and crime. This created a fertile ground for human trafficking, especially sex trafficking.

Women and children who live in poverty are at most risk of becoming trafficking victims. Prostitution in Russia has spread rapidly in recent years, with women from small towns and rural areas migrating (willing or unwillingly) to big cities such as Moscow, St. Petersburg, Omsk, or Yekaterinburg to engage in prostitution. Russian women are also lured abroad with sham promises of jobs such as dancers, models, waitresses or domestic helpers and end up caught in forced prostitution situations. However, Russia has ratified the UN Trafficking Protocol, and has taken steps to curb this phenomenon.

== See also ==
- Women in the Russian Revolution
- Women in the Russian and Soviet military
- Women's reproductive health in Russia
- Soviet women in World War II
- Gender pay gap in Russia
- Gender roles in post-communist Central and Eastern Europe
- Women in Europe
- Mother Heroine (1944–1991)
- Mother Heroine, (2022–present)
