= Rochelle Goldberg Ruthchild =

American historian

- Born: Rochelle L. Goldberg; 1940 (age 85–86); New York, U.S.
- Other name: Sarah Matilsky
- Education: Hofstra University (BA); University of Rochester (MA, PhD)
- Occupation: Historian

Rochelle L. Goldberg Ruthchild (born 1940) is an American historian and women's rights activist. Her research primarily focuses on Russian women's history and women's movements.

== Early life and education ==
Ruthchild was born to Samuel A. and Ruth Goldberg in 1940; her father was a high school teacher and her mother a homemaker. Of Belarusian and Polish descent, her grandparents immigrated to America in the early 1900s. Ruthchild attended high school in Levittown, New York. She earned a Bachelor of Arts degree in History and Mathematics from Hofstra University in 1962 and a Master of Arts and PhD degrees in history from the University of Rochester in 1964 and 1976.

Ruthchild additionally studied as an exchange student at the University of Leningrad for a period of time. Her PhD dissertation was entitled "The Russian Women’s Movement, 1859–1917". In the 1970s, after a failed marriage to a man and her own involvement in the feminist movement, she changed her surname to "Ruthchild" in honor of her mother. Ruthchild lived in Northern California in the late 1960s before moving to Boston, Massachusetts, where she taught courses at Cardinal Cushing College (1969–72), the Cambridge-Goddard Graduate School for Social Change (1971–78), and Goddard College (1979–81). In 1971, she participated in the Boston International Women's Day March and subsequent ten-day occupation of 888 Memorial Drive in Cambridge. These events led to the creation of the Cambridge Women's Center, of which she was a co-founder and served as the second president.

== Career ==
Ruthchild is Professor Emerita at Union Institute & University and is a research associate at Davis Center for Russian and Eurasian Studies at Harvard University. She has also served as the coordinator of the Davis Center's Socialism and Post Socialism Working Group and as the Director of the Russian School at Norwich University from 1988 to 1994. In addition, she is a visiting scholar at Brandeis University's Women's Studies Research Center and has been a member of the Aspasia editorial board since 2009.

In 1986, Ruthchild helped to establish the Women's Studius Caucus at the Association for Slavic, East European, and Eurasian Studies. In 1988, she helped found the Association of Women in Slavic Studies, serving as its first president from 1988 to 1990. In 1994, she compiled an annotated bibliography of works on Russian women's history, entitled Women in Russia and the Soviet Union: An Annotated Bibliography. She has written a book, Equality and Revolution: Women’s Rights in the Russian Empire, 1905-1917, which was given honorary mentions for the 2011 Reginald Zelnik Book Prize in History awarded by the Association for Slavic, East European, and Eurasian Studies, and the Heldt Prize awarded by the Association of Women in Slavic Studies.

Ruthschild was an executive producer for the documentary film Left on Pearl. The film won the Director's Choice Award at the Black Maria Film Festival. She is a member of The 888 Women's History Project and the Boston chapter of The Workers Circle. She is additionally a former member of Bread and Roses.

In 2018, Ruthchild was honored with the Association for Women in Slavic Studies' Outstanding Achievement Award.

== Personal life ==
Ruthchild married Robert Ziegler in 1968; they divorced the following year. She later came out as a lesbian. Ruthchild married her longtime partner Vicki Gabriner in 2004; they stayed together until Gabriner's passing.

== Bibliography ==
- Women in Russia and the Soviet Union: An Annotated Bibliography (1994; compiler)
- Equality and Revolution: Women’s Rights in the Russian Empire, 1905-1917 (2010)
