= Gender pay gap in Russia =

In Russia the wage gap exists (after 1991, but also before) and statistical analysis shows that most of it cannot be explained by lower qualifications of women compared to men. On the other hand, occupational segregation by gender and labor market discrimination seem to account for a large share of it.

Eurostat defines the (unadjusted) gender pay gap (or wage gap) as the difference between average gross hourly earnings of male paid employees and of female paid employees as a percentage of average gross hourly earnings of male paid employees. In other words, it is the difference between 1 and the gender pay ratio (gender pay ratio = (women's average earnings/men's average earnings)*100%).

It serves to some extent as an indicator of gender inequality level within a country, but even more so for the unequal opportunities faced by women and men in the labor market. Also the indicator reflects the incompatible requirements of career and family as well as the poverty risk of single parent households, both problems which mostly women face.

The October Revolution (1917) and the dissolution of the Soviet Union in 1991 have shaped the developments in the gender wage gap. These two main turning points in the Russian history frame the analysis of Russia's gender pay gap found in the economic literature. Consequently, the pay gap study can be examined for two periods: the wage gap in Soviet Russia (1917–1991), and the wage gap in the transition and post-transition (after 1991).

== Soviet Russia ==
Under communism women's participation in the labor market was encouraged. The rapid industrialization and egalitarian ideology pressed for women to leave their homes and join the ranks of the working class. In 1936, Article 122 of the new Soviet Constitution decreed equal rights for women and their equal standing with men in all spheres of economic, political, social and cultural life.

Women also enjoyed various benefits, including fully paid maternity leaves, free childcare provided by enterprise or state owned kindergartens, as well as legal protection from overly physical and dangerous work. Some researchers conclude that it was partly due to theses type of laws that gender differences in earnings never ceased to exist in Russia and in the whole Soviet Union.

=== The gender pay gap: Evidence ===
Soviet authorities did not publish data on wages and salaries classified by sex. As a result, only a partial perspective on gender pay gap is possible based on small scale studies. Nevertheless, they can be useful as they offer a benchmark.

One of the economists who provides some data on the gender wage gap in Soviet Russia is A. Rashin (1928). According to him, the gender pay gap in the textile industry for Leningrad (today's Saint Petersburg) in 1928 was 27.4%, while in Ivanovo Oblast it was as small as 5.5%. However, according to Khrachev (1964), these figures tend to underestimate the gender wage gap. His argument is that in those days the textile industry was known for paying a generous salary to women but not to men, hence on the aggregate level the pay gap would be much higher than what Rashin presented.

Despite the lack of official statistics, McAuley (1981) managed to get data on wage differentials from a variety of sample surveys conducted in multiple regions of the country. For 1940 his estimates of the gender wage gap range between 47% and 53%. By 1958 seemed to improve and the wage gap declined to 39.5%.

He also finds that between 1960 and 1965 the gender earnings gap (specifically for Leningrad) was around 30.7%. Very similar estimates were found by L. Migranova and M. Mozhina (1991), who estimated for Taganrog a female to male pay gap of 33% for 1968 and 32% for 1977–1978. For 1972 – 1976 McAuley (1981) assumes that the wage gap must have declined due to the wage revision performed in those years pushing the gender earnings gap down to 20–25%. However, in the last years of the Soviet Union the pay gap according to K. Katz (2001) increased again to 36%, while according to Newell and Reilly's calculations this ratio was higher – 70.9%.

Comparing these statistics to those from Western and Scandinavian countries one would have to conclude that while Soviet Russia had similar wage differentials to those in Western countries, the Scandinavian countries did definitely better than Soviet Russia. Other socialist countries in Eastern Europe had slightly lower statistics than those in Soviet Russia.

Year	Country and Labor Force Group	Gender wage gap (unadjusted)
1953	Great Britain	46%
1968	Great Britain	47%
1975	Great Britain	38%
1969	Norway:manufacturing	26%
1968	Sweden: industrial workers	21%
1966	France: employees	37%
1964	Switzerland: workers	37%
1959	Czechoslovakia: socialist sector	33.8%
1970	Czechoslovakia: socialist sector	32.9%
1972	Poland: socialist sector	33.5%
1972	Hungary: state sector	27.5%
SOURCE: McAuley, A. (1981) Women's Work and Wages in the Soviet Union, (p. 21)

=== Sources of the gender pay gap ===
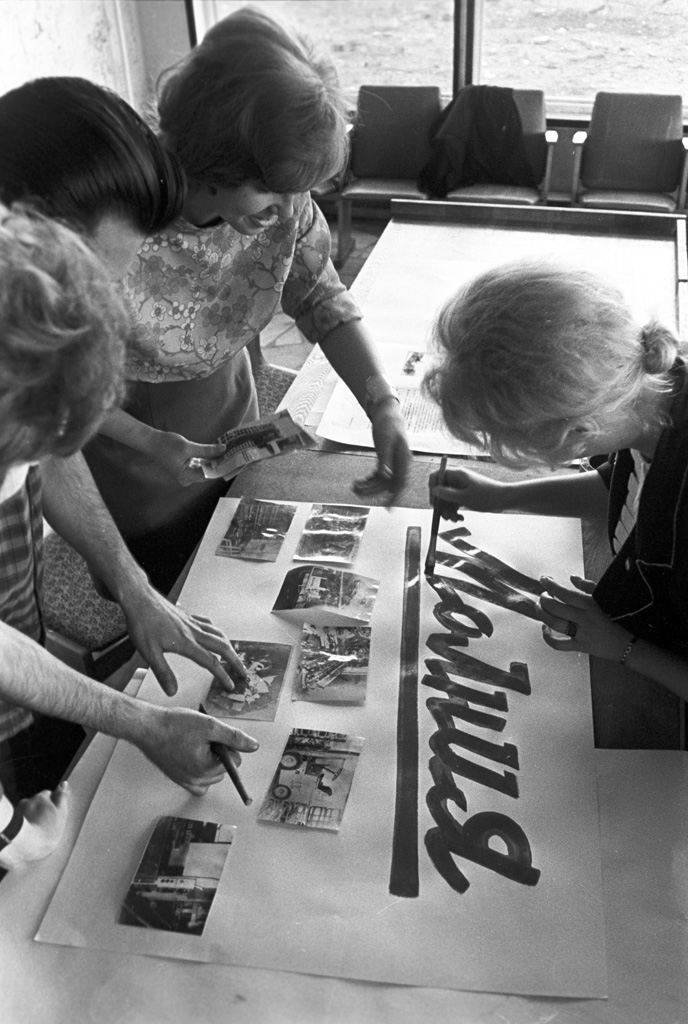
Watchdog "Komsomol Searchlight" members making the Thunderbolt wall newspaper at Leninist Komsomol auto works, 1973

Even though the female labor force participation in the Soviet Union was higher than in Western countries (For 1960–1988: Austria – 60.7%, France – 72%, Italy – 54.2%, Ireland – 44.7%, Portugal – 67.4%, Soviet Union around 90%), throughout its history women were regarded as a "specific labor force" and occupational segregation was a lived reality. C. G. Ogloblin (1999), for instance, mentions that protective legislation restricted women's employment in jobs that were considered dangerous or physically demanding and encouraged their entrance into jobs that suit their "biological and psychological peculiarities" and their "moral ethical temperament".

Women hence ended up in such sectors as education, healthcare, trade, food and light industry, while men were mostly concentrated in the heavy industry, mining, construction and engineering. Such segregation was one of the main forces that drove the gender wage gap in the Soviet Russia. This was due to the fact that in the centralized wage system, where market forces did not interfere, earnings within sectors were determined by the perception of a certain sector's productivity, laboriousness and social usefulness.

Since Marxist ideology considers the productive sphere (manufacturing) superior to the unproductive one (services, office jobs), the blue-collar wages always tended to be higher than the white-collar wages. Women in Russia were highly concentrated in the white-collar jobs therefore their earnings were on average lower than those of men throughout the whole Soviet Union's history.

Nevertheless, occupational segregation was not the only contributor the wage gap during the soviet times, as labor market discrimination, even though forbidden by law, was well set afoot and contributed in big measure to wage differentials. Ogloblin (1999) writes: "Since household and family responsibilities were explicitly treated as women's domain, women often chose to sacrifice career interests to family responsibilities. Furthermore, since both creativity and authority were identified with men, women who tried to pursue managerial or professional careers encountered subtle but effective resistance to their promotion".

His text suggests that glass ceilings were present in the Soviet Union and deeply rooted in people's perceptions of women's role and gender norms. Newell and Reilly (2000) similarly mention that, despite high labor force participation, women held few senior positions mostly due to two reasons: first, since Russia never went through the revolution in gender relations that took place in the West, the slow but fundamental shift in household division of labor did not happen; second and as a consequence, working women had to carry a double burden as the domestic duties remained entirely on their shoulders leaving them less time to pursue a career.

A. McAuley (1981), on the other hand, identifies an additional reason for the persistence of wage gaps in Russia – the "differential participation" of women. Differential participation is nothing else but the idea that women worked shorter hours than men and in some sense supplied less labor. McAuley (1981) mentions that this was mostly due to the fact that domestic work was viewed as being almost exclusively women's responsibility.

== Economic transition: Soviet Russia to Russian Federation ==
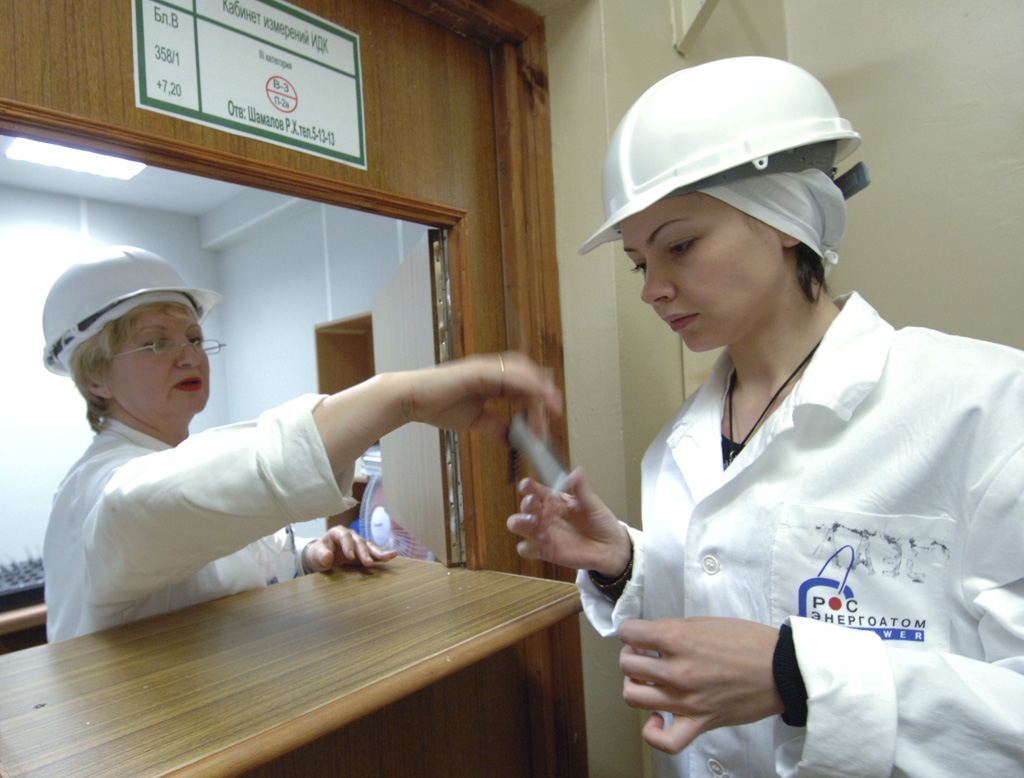
Employees at the Leningrad Nuclear Power Plant, 2008

The dissolution of the Soviet Union and the transition from a centrally planned economy to a market economy led to significant changes in all spheres including the labor market. The elimination of most controls on prices, wages, trade and currency exchange, enforcement of restrictions on enterprise subsidies, and exposure to international competition influenced in great measure the labor market institutions and regulations. Economic restructuring required the reallocation of the labor force from the obsolete sectors to the more productive ones.

Therefore, the state priorities shifted from heavy industry to oil and gas production for international consumption, banking and finance, marketing and importation of consumer goods.

Some changes were introduced prior to transition. For instance, in 1987 the Law on the State Enterprise was adopted, which allowed enterprises in the "productive" sphere to become self-financing. This meant that goods-producing enterprises had to meet their wage payment obligations from their own revenue.

While this change scarcely affected women, as women were still concentrated in the "nonproductive" sector, it did affect the pay gap between women and men. The nonproductive sector, encompassing such sectors as education and healthcare, was still financed from the state budget and was therefore at greater risk of budgetary cuts, which were inevitable in the difficult transitory period.

Ogloblin (1999) for instance wrote that due to the budget deficit and state's continuing neglect of the nonproductive sector, wages and salaries in this sphere were set at a significantly lower level than those set by self-financed enterprises (i.e. where men were highly concentrated). It is reasonable to expect that the transition contributed to an increase in the wage differentials between genders.

The dissolution of the former regime also increased overall income inequality. Since women who are usually concentrated in the lower tier of the income distribution, are most vulnerable to this kind of changes, it is very plausible that rising inequality had an adverse effect on the gender pay differentials during the transition years. Hansberry and Gerry, Kim and Li provide evidence that the increase in dispersion of incomes brought about by liberalization had a negative impact on the gender wage gap in Russia.

In addition, the social safety nets suffered from the neoliberal policies pursued by the Russian government. Reconstruction brought significant cuts in spending of inefficient production enterprises, which reduced their welfare responsibilities. The network of enterprise childcare centers that existed in the Soviet Russia were now too costly to be maintained and had to close due to lack of funding.

This, plus the budget cuts mentioned earlier, contributed in great measure to the reduction in the female labor force participation reported by the World Bank in Russia (from around 80–90% in the Soviet period to 59% in 1991, 58% – 1992, 56% – 1993, 54% – 1994, 53% – 1995, 52% – 1996).

Another peculiar feature of the Russian labor market in transition was the emergence of such practices as wage arrears and payments in kind. Since the social safety net was inadequate to cope with high unemployment, enterprise managers, under the guidance of the government, chose to retain a large labor force rather than add to the numbers of unemployed.

While layoffs existed, in most cases workers would not be fired but forced to take unpaid leave or shorter working hours and the ones who worked full-time were frequently not paid for months. Gerry, Kim, and Li (2004) estimate that "Wage arrears accumulated rapidly between 1994 and 1998, accounting to 275% of the monthly wage bill of employees in receipt of wage arrears." Such developments had a surprisingly positive impact on the gender pay gap, as women were less affected by wage arrears than men.

All of these changes had a rather contradictory influence on the development of the gender pay gap after the fall of the Soviet Union. And while some researchers found that the pay gap did not experience major changes, others show in their analyses that the wage differentials increased considerably during the transition years. Despite these contradictions no researcher found that the wage gap decreased after 1991.

=== The gender pay gap: Evidence ===
Most researches use data from the same source – the Russian Longitudinal Monitoring Survey (RLMS) to analyze trends and patterns in the gender pay gap in the post 1991 period. However, the estimation techniques differ among studies, which could be the cause of slight inconsistencies in the reported statistics.

A. Newell and B. Reiley (2000) use the RLMS data for 1992 and 1996 to estimate the gender pay gap. They find no significant change in the gender pay gap for the transitional years and report an average gap of 32.5% for 1992 and 30.5% for 1996. Katz (1999) finds a 37.9% wage gap for 1993, which compared to her estimate for 1989 (43.9%) suggests a relative worsening of women's position in comparison to that of men. For 1994–1998 Ogloblin (1999) finds an average gap of 28.3%.

This is consistent with Hansberry's analysis (2004) who wrote: that the average earnings for both men and women increased between 1996 and 1998 "but women's average wages have increased 38 percent compared to an increase of 35 percent for men's wages". Hence from her text it is clear that the wage gap shrank between those years.

Nevertheless, in the subsequent years she finds a reverse of trend with a peak in 2000 and 2001 when the wage differential reached 31.7% and 31.2% respectively. In 2002 there was a sharp increase in women's average earnings, which led to a decline in the women – men earnings differential, which was now only 23% according to Hansberry's estimations.

Another analysis of the gap between 1996–2002 finds stability in the gender wage gap without any obvious trend of growth. The gender pay gap estimates from this analysis correspond roughly to the estimates provided by Hansberry: 1996 – 30%, 1998 – 28%, 2000 – 37% and 2002 – 34%.

== Human capital factors ==
The typical neoclassical economic approach appeals to differences in human capital between women and men in estimating the factors that drive gender pay gaps around the world. The main hypothesis of the human capital theory is that women might earn lower wages because they have on average lower education, less training and less work experience.

The neoclassical explanation usually relies on women's deliberate choices to acquire less education, invest less into their training and choose shorter working hours. The heterodox approach, mostly the feminist approach, by contrast, emphasizes the effect of gender socialization on skill acquisition and labor market discrimination. Despite these divergences, both schools agree that differences in human capital might be to some extent responsible for pay differentials between men and women.

The case of transitional Russia does not support the human capital theory. Kazakova (2007) for instance, found that in 1996–2002 the work experience difference between women and men in Russia was not significant and its influence on the wage gap was minuscule. She also mentions that Russian women's average education level is higher than that of men and therefore it cannot explain the men–women pay differentials.

Ogloblin (1999) reaches the same conclusion. Contrary to the human capital hypothesis, women in Russia are actually at an advantage when it comes to human capital endowments and that the gross gender differential would have been even higher if women's human capital endowments were the same as men's. Other researchers who analyzed the pay gap in transition Russia reach similar conclusions.

== Job segregation ==
It is a well-established fact that globally occupations and industries disproportionately staffed by women workers pay lower wages to both men and women in comparison to male-dominated occupations and industries. Therefore, gender segregation in occupations and industries must serve as a key explanation for the existence of the gender wage gap.

This appears to be also the case of Russia. Most researches estimate very high occupation and industry segregation indexes for Russia. They also find that a considerable part of the gender pay gap can be explained by women's concentration in low paid industries and jobs. Hansberry (2004), for example, shows that occupational segregation accounts for 22% to 52% of the gender wage gap for the years between 1996 and 2002.

The explanations for women concentrating in low paid industries and occupations center on the idea of gender socialization and discrimination. Under the influence of patriarchal traditions and gender stereotyping women often choose occupations that are considered by society to be appropriate for them and not necessarily the ones that offer better career perspectives and higher wages.

Ogloblin (1999) noted that when talking about women's preference for the low paid sectors it is necessary to stress out that these preferences are not exogenous, they are influence by learned social and cultural values that stereotype occupations as "male" or "female" and discriminate against the latter. This has a feedback effect, as the choices of both workers and employers strengthen the stereotype of "male" and "female" occupations, which are then reinforced further through legislation and labor market policies such as reduced work hours and flexible working conditions.

== Discrimination ==
Blau, Ferber and Winkler (2010) define labor market discrimination as the situation when "two equally qualified individuals are treated differently solely on the basis of gender (race, age, disability, etc)".(Note that this definition is different from the one offered by feminist economists) Analysis of the pay gap in Russia shows that discrimination is one of the major factors that account for the magnitude of wage differentials between men and women.

Hansberry (2004) argues that a high level of discrimination against mothers and women in general is reflected in job advertisements, where employers state openly their preferences for males or women without children. Gerry, Kim and Li (2004) bring suggestive evidence of discrimination in the wage setting system. They estimate in their sample that between 87% and 94% of women received lower wages than they could have received if there was a non-discriminatory pay structure; men on the other hand would be worse off (the percentage of men who would be worse off ranges between 83% and 97%).

Newelly and Reilly (2000) also report on discrimination in their study. They perform the Oaxaca–Blinder decomposition of the wage gap and include in the list of factors, that determine the explained wage gap, industrial and occupational segregation. The share of the unexplained wage gap the two authors estimate is significant, but if taking into consideration that it is possible for both occupation and industry segregation by gender to be a result of discrimination then in this case there would be an underestimation bias in the coefficient for discrimination (i.e. the level of labor market discrimination in reality would be higher than the one estimated by their unexplained share of the pay gap).

== Laws and policies ==
Two most important sources of legislation regarding gender equality and discrimination issues after the collapse of the Soviet Union are:

1. Constitution of the Russian Federation (1993), mainly article 19.2-3, which among other things advocates equal rights to both men and women and equal opportunities to exercise them as well as article 37.3, which sets out the right to labor remuneration without any discrimination and not lower than minimum wages and salaries established by federal law.
2. Labor code of the Russian Federation (2001) – article 64 prohibits unjustified refusals to complete a labor contract based on sex, skin color, nationality, language, origin, etc. and article 132 forbids any discrimination when setting or changing wage levels and other remuneration terms. Other Laws and codes that formally insure gender equality include the Civil code adopted in November 1994, the Code of Administrative Offences (2001), as well as the Educational Law (1992). Russia also ratified the ILO Equal Remuneration Convention (No. 100) in April 1951 as well as the Discrimination, Employment and Occupation Convention (No. 111) in May 1961.

After 1991, despite the relative stability in the gender wage gap, the overall gender inequality in the labor market increased due to a drop in women's labor force participation rate. Most policies therefore were targeting an increase in women's labor force participation rather than a reduction in the gender pay gap.

For instance, in 1991 there was adopted the Law on Employment of the Population, which was supposed to restructure the Federal Employment Service to serve as a genuine employment service similar to the ones in Western countries. Provisions were made for counseling, training and retraining, distribution of unemployment benefits, however these were of limited duration and of limited quantity given the low budgeting. EU, OECD, UN and other Western associations established consulting organizations and offered grants, which were supposed to help fulfill the restructuring of the Federal Employment Service.

With their policies a large share of women was included in the "vulnerable categories" to receive additional support through special programs, support groups and retraining. However, these programs did not attract too much of public attention and the main professional retraining offered to women were in accounting, massage therapy, hairdressing, tailoring and childcare. Even though these professions were in demand such requalification did not help women to move out of the low paying occupations and narrow the existing gender wage gap.
