= Women's reproductive health in Russia =

Women's reproductive health in Russia refers to the set of physical, mental, and social health issues and services available to women in Russia. It includes the rights, laws, and problems experienced by women and their families regarding proper reproductive health. Women account for over half of the Russian population and are considered a vulnerable population due to political and social problems from inequalities in gender, age, socioeconomic status, and geographical location that affect access to comprehensive health care. As Russia struggles with a decreasing birthrate and increase in STIs, HIV, and poor reproductive health care, the need for government financed services and international programs is essential to successfully reach this vulnerable population. Currently, women in Russia access care through government funded free services, private insurance, and NGO programs.

== Issues ==
=== Female and gynecologic cancers ===
Breast cancer is one of the most common causes of death for women in Russia, particularly among the 45- to 55-year-old age group. As of 2003, there were approximately 50,000 reported cases per year. Though Russia has over 2,150 mammogram machines, there is no national screening program and poor education for women regarding early detection, treatment, and counseling. Much of this comes from a lack of social and psychological assistance from the medical sphere, family, and Russian society.

Gynecologic Cancers (including, but not limited to breast, cervical, uterine, and ovarian) – Of screening services, cervical screenings are common in Russia, though a woman must be referred by a gynecologist. The Center for Reproductive Rights reports that 91.7% of women in Russia have had at least one appointment in their lives, but this is often insufficient to ensure early detection. Like breast cancer, there are no national screening programs.

=== STIs and HIV/AIDS ===
The prevalence of STIs, particularly among young women, has been steadily increasing since the fall of the Soviet Union in 1991. STIs have increased from increased promiscuity and lack of knowledge about prophylactics and treatment, especially among teens. Lack of treatment in youth has led to reproductive issues later in life.

HIV/AIDS in Russia drastically increased through intravenous drug use and sexual promiscuity that flourished in the post-Soviet era; the incidence of HIV has steadily increased over the years. Women are particularly vulnerable to the disease, contracting it through partners, prostitution, incest, rape, and sex trafficking. There is also a significant problem of Russian mothers abandoning HIV-positive babies. The government has rolled out a series of programs since the 1990s, but women encounter problems with access to protection and care due to gender discrimination and family rejection.

=== Contraception and sterilization ===
In Russia, there is a social norm that women are responsible for contraception. This increases vulnerability as many women have not received any formal sex education and do not know where to acquire contraception (or that it is necessary). Under the Soviet Union, federal programs provided condoms, IUDs and estrogen pills, and allowed abortion as a form of contraception. Additionally, communist health care had family planning services and maternal child care manuals available. Currently, women rely on a combination of traditional and modern contraceptive methods and lack some of the services once provided by the Soviet Union. Sterilization is legal for women only if they are over age 35, have had two or more children, or if there is medical need (such as cancer). This policy is due to Russia’s need to increase the population following sharps declines after 1991.

=== Abortion ===
Abortion in Russia is legal up to the 12th week of pregnancy. As a pronatalist country, legislation as of 2003 forbids abortion after week 12 except in cases of rape, imprisonment, death or disability of husband, and loss of “parental rights”. Russia is still struggling to change the social norm of abortion as a primary form of contraception, and abortion remains one of the biggest challenges to women’s reproductive health because of post-abortion mental and physical health problems and lack of proper care.

=== Family planning services, prenatal and postnatal care ===
These free services are available through the Ministry of Health. There are strong incentives for women in Russia to have multiple children due to depopulation, so the government provides health care to ensure healthy babies are born. However, women report loneliness, depression, and dissatisfaction with their maternal health care providers. Over 75.2% of women see a provider less than 3 times during a pregnancy. After giving birth, many women report a lack of psychological and practical help.

=== Maternal and infant mortality ===
The Russian Federation is considered a developing country by the World Bank. Maternal and infant mortality rates account for some of this categorization. As of 2011, the maternal mortality rate was 24 per 100,000 births, with an infant mortality rate of 9 per 1000 births.

=== Mental health services ===
Mental health services for reproductive health involve psychological counseling and services for issues including abortion, postpartum depression, abandoned and unwanted babies, spousal abuse, and suicide. Russian women cite psychological issues from the transition out of a communist system and the challenges of identifying their new role in society. Lack of programming has led to untreated mental health problems that extend to physical reproductive health and well-being.

== Social issues ==
Much of the vulnerability of Russian women in accessing reproductive health care stems from social issues.

=== Sex education ===
Sex education is not compulsory in Russian schools and under 5% of Russian teens have been educated on proper contraception and family planning. The “Children of Russia” federal program has created family planning programs and voluntary sex education programs at health clinics for those under 17. However, there is social stigma attached to the utilization of clinics and most young women remain uneducated. Often, young women do not know how to protect themselves, leading to high rates of pregnancy and abortion.

=== Access to care ===
Many Russian women are unaware of where to access care. Additionally, issues of reproductive health care in rural areas is a huge concern for Russian women. Much of the population is clustered in cities, but for the millions of Russian women living in rural areas, reproductive health care is extremely limited. On average there are 38 physicians and 95 nurses per 10,000 inhabitants, but these numbers can halve in rural areas. Additionally, specialty clinics, including maternity and gynecologic clinics have declined in number in the post-Soviet era.

=== Religious issues ===
The Russian Orthodox Church emphasizes the need for an increase in the birth rate and is openly opposed to abortion. Some of the problems with access to reproductive health care stem from Church-State ties, that hinder support and funding for contraceptive and abortion services.

=== Domestic violence ===
Domestic violence in Russia fosters the vulnerability of women. Often out of fear, women fail to seek contraception or abortion. In some families, women accept domestic violence as a norm and are unaware of the services available to them. Especially among poor and rural populations, lack of education and socioeconomic status lead to failures to seek reproductive healthcare if the husband forbids it.

== Reproductive health rights and Russian law ==
=== Federal and local laws ===
Women's Reproductive Health Care is protected by the "Fundamentals of Legislation on Public Health Care", part of the Constitution of Russia. The Ministry of Health (Russia) oversees women’s reproductive health care services, which are provided through a combination of free care packages and compulsory private insurance. Insurance costs have created a burden for poor women and lead to inequality in services. These discrepancies have left women vulnerable and increased health care failures in the issues for free care, health services suffer from an uneven distribution of providers, convoluted regulations regarding patient rights and privacy, and difficulty transferring providers.

== Sexual harassment, rape and sex trafficking ==
The Russian Criminal Code outlines laws against sexual crimes, but these issues are commonly underreported among Russian women. As few as 5-10% of rape survivors report their rape, and many women do not tell their families. This leads to complications in seeking mental and physical care, as well as access to abortion. Human trafficking in Russia has increased the vulnerability of women through increases in underage forced prostitution and sexual violence. Over two-thirds of trafficked girls are under age 25, and have no access to care. The government has increased efforts to crack down on trafficking, but there is also documentation of tacit complicity with the practice.

== International aid for women's reproductive health ==
A number of NGOs have begun to administer programs for women in reproductive health service areas, including:

WHEP – Administered by Susan G. Komen, “Women’s Health Empowerment Program” serves as a psychosocial support service for Russian women and their families. The program focuses on public education in early detection as well as peer support, educational talks and materials, and training of healthcare professionals.

Women’s Wellness Centers – USAID and AIHA developed centers in the Soviet Union in 1992 that provide primary care and educational outreach programs. They have been very important for improving women’s reproductive health, especially in St. Petersburg, due to their “women friendly” environment.

WHO – The World Health Organization has put a large focus on improving maternal healthcare in Russia including education, training healthcare professionals, and strengthening trust and security in doctors. The program has been met with varied success, as issues of forcing democratic ideals, cultural differences, and lack of involvement by actual patients have gotten in the way of effective changes.

== Other issues ==
Other social and health issues that should be considered in developing successful health policy for women’s reproductive health in Russia include:

- Decreasing the wage gap between men and women
- Decreasing the education gap between men and women as well as between urban and rural women
- Improving LGBTQ reproductive health and rights
- Improving marriage civil Rights for women including laws regarding divorce, custody, and property rights
- Improving Russian women's empowerment

== See also ==
- LGBT rights in Russia
- Healthcare in Russia
- Demographics of Russia
- Russian Cross
- Ministry of Health (Russia)
