= Dmitry Filosofov =

Russian writer, critic, editor, and activist (1872–1940)

- Дмитрий Философов
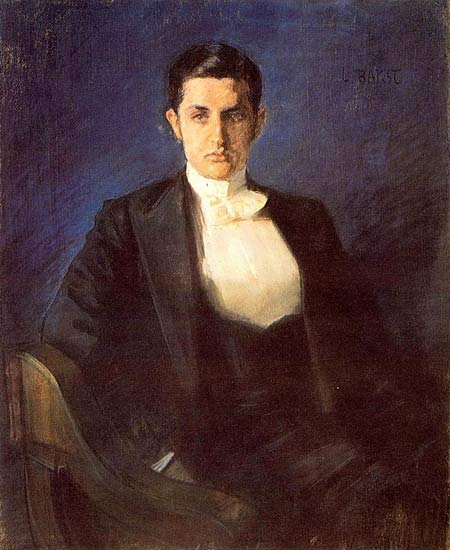
- Born: Dmitry Vladimirovich Filosofov; 7 April [O.S. 26 March] 1872; Saint Petersburg, Russian Empire
- Died: 4 August 1940 (aged 68); Otwock, German-occupied Poland
- Education: Saint Petersburg State University
- Occupations: Literary critic; essayist; editor; political activist
- Years active: 1897–1940
- Relatives: Anna Filosofova (mother); Sergei Diaghilev (cousin)

Dmitry Vladimirovich Filosofov (Note: In this name that follows East Slavic naming customs, the patronymic is Vladimirovich and the family name is Filosofov.) (Russian: Дми́трий Влади́мирович Филосо́фов; 7 April [O.S. 26 March] 1872 – 4 August 1940) was a Russian author, essayist, literary critic, religious thinker, newspaper editor and political activist, best known for his role in the influential early 1900s Mir Iskusstva circle and part of quasi-religious Troyebratstvo (The Brotherhood of Three), along with two of his closest friends and spiritual allies, Dmitry Merezhkovsky and Zinaida Gippius.

Following the Bolshevik Revolution he emigrated to Poland.

== Biography ==
The son of feminist and philanthropist Anna Filosofova and Vladimir Dmitriyevich Filosofov, a powerful official in the Ministry of War and Defence, Dmitry Filosofov was educated first in the private Karl May School (where he first met Alexandre Benois and Konstantin Somov), then in the Saint Petersburg University, studying law. After a couple of years spent abroad, he started working as a journalist, writing for Severny Vestnik and Obrazovanye. With the inception of Mir Iskusstva magazine, Filosofov became the editor - first of literary, then of literary criticism sections. It was at this time that his close friendship with Dmitry Merezhkovsky and Zinaida Gippius began; soon he joined them to form "Troyebratstvo", a quasi-religious group which some saw as a domestic sect, claiming to aim at renovating the Christian values along the new, modernist lines.

Along with Merezhkovskys he was one of the initiators and practical organizers of - first the Religious-Philosophical Society, then the Novy Put magazine, which he edited in 1904, the last year of its existence. Years 1906-1908 he spent with Merezhkovskys in Paris; when back in Russia he continued writing, contributing to Slovo and Russkaya Mysl among others.

Sharing Merezhkovskys' hostility towards Bolshevist Russia, in December 1919 he fled the country but refused to follow the couple down to Paris. Instead, along with Boris Savinkov, the notorious terrorist-turned-novelist he struck up a friendship with, Filosofov chose to stay in Warsaw to begin working on the reformation of the White Army on the territory of Poland. He was a coordinator of Russian Political Committee, one of the leaders of the People's Union for the Defence of Motherland and Freedom, and Józef Piłsudski's counsellor. Choosing to stay in Poland, but visiting Paris occasionally, Filosofov edited numerous Russian immigrant newspapers, including Svoboda (Freedom, 1920–1921), Za Svobodu (1921–1932), Molva (People's Talk, 1932–1934), co-edited Paris-Warsaw magazine Myech (Sword, 1934–1939).

Dmitry Filosofov died in Otwock near Warsaw on 4 August 1940 and is buried at the Orthodox Cemetery in Warsaw.
