= Evgenia Konradi =

Russian writer, journalist, and translator (1838–1898)

- Евгения Ивановна Конради
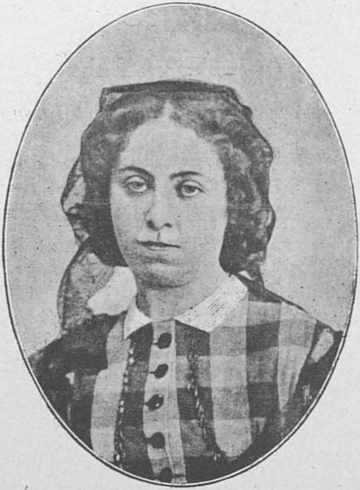
- Born: Evgenia Ivanovna Bochechkarova; April 21, 1838; Moscow, Russian Empire
- Died: October 7, 1898 (aged 60); Paris, France
- Occupations: Writer, journalist, translator, advocate for female education
- Spouse: P. F. Konradi
- Writing career
- Language: Russian
- Notable work: Ispoved' materi (Confessions of a mother)

Evgenia Ivanovna Konradi (Russian: Евгения Ивановна Конради, née Bochechkarova, Russian: Бочечкаровa) was a Russian writer, journalist, and translator. She was first an editor, then owner of the newspaper Nedelya (Week), in which she published articles on society in foreign countries.

== Biography ==
Evgenia Bochechkarova was born in Moscow in 1838. Toward the end of the 1850s, she moved to St Petersburg and married P. F. Konradi, a doctor and journalist. Between 1866 and 1868, Konradi published articles in the journal Zhensky Vestnik (Women's Herald), a publication dedicated to the position of women in society. Konradi wrote predominantly for the section dedicated to life for women in foreign countries. In 1868, Konradi became editor of the political and literary newspaper Nedelya, before buying the paper in 1869 with P. A. Gaideburov and Yu. A. Rossel. In 1873, Nedelya had approximately 2,500 subscribers. Konradi left Nedelya in 1874, after which she suffered financial hardship.

In 1885, Konradi took one of her sons to Switzerland for medical care for his consumption, but he died. After his death, Konradi never returned to Russia, dying in a public hospital in Paris in 1898.

== Women's rights advocacy ==
Konradi participated in the 1860s women's rights movement of the political left, alongside Anna Filosofova, Maria Trubnikova, and Nadezhda Stasova. Konradi wrote a letter in December 1867 to the first Congress of Russian Natural Scientists, arguing for the need to educate women and requesting their support in petitioning the government for systematic female education. In March and May 1868, Konradi joined 400 other petitioners requesting the rector of St Petersburg University to allow women access to higher education there.

== Written works ==
- Черные богатыри. Жизнь рудокопов под землей [Dark heroes. The life of miners below the earth] (in Russian). St Petersburg. 1884.
- Общественные задачи домашнего воспитания. Книга для матерей [Social tasks for home education. A book for mothers] (in Russian). St Petersburg. 1883.
- Исповедь матери [Confessions of a mother] (in Russian). St Petersburg. 1876.
