= Anna Filosofova =

Russian activist (1837–1912)

- Анна Философова
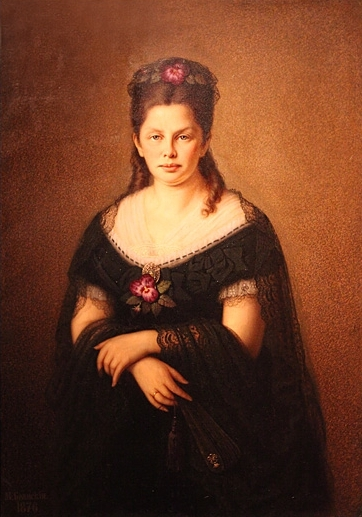
- 1876 portrait
- Born: Anna Pavlovna Diaghileva; 5 April 1837; Saint Petersburg, Russia
- Died: 17 March 1912 (aged 74); Saint Petersburg, Russia
- Occupations: Activist; philanthropist
- Movement: Feminism in Russia
- Children: 6, including Dmitry
- Relatives: Sergei Diaghilev (nephew)

Anna Pavlovna Filosofova (Note: In this name that follows East Slavic naming customs, the patronymic is Pavlovna and the family name is Filosofova.) (Russian: Анна Павловна Философова; née Diaghileva; 5 April 1837 – 17 March 1912) was a Russian feminist and activist of the 19th and early 20th centuries.

Born into a wealthy, noble family, she married Vladimir Filosofov and they had six children. Initially concerned with the plight of serfs, Filosofova became a feminist in the late 1850s after joining the salon of Maria Trubnikova, who educated her on the subject. Alongside Trubnikova and Nadezhda Stasova, Filosofova was one of the earliest leaders of the Russian women's movement. Together, the three friends and allies were referred to as the "triumvirate". They founded and led several charitable organizations designed to promote women's cultural and economic independence, such as the Society for Cheap Lodgings and Other Benefits for the Citizens of St. Petersburg. Filosofova served as the president of that organization for several years.

Subsequently, the triumvirate pressured government officials to allow higher education for women, resulting in the creation of the Vladimirskii courses and the Bestuzhev Courses. Continuing opposition meant that their successes were sometimes limited or reversed. Filosofova also founded a mixed-gender school at her own family's estate. From 1879 to 1881, Filosofova was briefly exiled on suspicion of revolutionary sympathies. After her return to Russia, she continued to work as an activist and philanthropist in support of Russian women. Outliving both Trubnikova and Stasova, she survived to participate in the Russian Revolution of 1905 and chair the first Russian women's congress in 1908, becoming a revered feminist figure. Filosofova died in 1912.

== Early life and education ==
Anna Pavlovna Diaghileva was born on 5 April 1837 in Saint Petersburg to a rich and aristocratic family. Diaghileva was the oldest of nine children. Her father, Pavel Diaghilev, retired from a role with the Ministry of Finance in 1850 and opened a distillery. Her mother, Anna Ivanovna, ran the distillery after 1855, as Pavel had become fanatically religious.

As was typical for aristocratic Russians, Diaghileva was educated at home; she later wrote that all she learned was "French, German, and curtseying". In 1855, she married Vladimir Filosofov, a high-ranking official in the Ministry of War and Defence who was seventeen years her senior. Their first child was born in 1858; they eventually had six, three girls and three boys (including Dmitry, who became a well-known writer). The scholar Rochelle Ruthchild writes that Filosofova was "almost constantly pregnant" between 1858 and 1872, although it did not appear to significantly affect her health or work.

Filosofova's husband came from a serf-owning family, and after their marriage she made frequent visits to the Filosofov estate near Bezhanitsy in Pskov Oblast. The visits had a powerful effect on Filosofova, whose family did not keep serfs. Filosofova's father-in-law is described as a "tyrannical figure" by the academic Marianna Muravyeva; he sexually abused the serfs under his control. Filosofova began to contemplate social issues, and especially the plight of poor peasants and serfs. Upon Russia's liberation of the serfs in 1861, Filosofova wrote that it was a "holy day".

In the late 1850s, Filosofova met Maria Trubnikova through the latter's salon. Trubnikova gave her books on women's issues and Filosofova credited this mentorship with helping develop her beliefs. She later said of Trubnikova that "she was an angel, gentle and patient. She developed me, read with me. This was hard, since I didn't know anything." The two became close friends and allies, along with Nadezhda Stasova, and were referred to by their contemporaries as the "triumvirate". The three became leaders of the feminist movement in the Russian Empire, though they did not describe themselves as feminists. The historian Richard Stites describes the triumvirate as "the three major [feminist] figures", who drew on support from wider circles of dozens of women who "moved in and out" of various roles. The later author Ariadna Tyrkova-Williams wrote that "[The triumvirate's] members perfectly complemented one another. The plans and will came from Trubnikova. Stasova's part was the performance, the persistence in doing the job. Filosofova embodied spirituality and ethics."

In contrast to the contemporaneous Russian nihilist movement, Filosofova and the other members of the triumvirate were not radical in public style or fashion, and retained their stations in the good graces of the upper class. Criticized by a nihilist adherent for dressing like "a doll" at an important meeting, Filosofova replied that "clothes do not make the woman", according to Ruthchild. Filosofova and her husband maintained a close relationship, even as her work sometimes resulted in setbacks for his governmental career. She did not wish to be subordinated, writing to him that "to yield to you is beyond my power".

== Activism and career ==
Through Trubnikova's salon, Filosofova became connected with a large group of wealthy women concerned with the economic and educational status of women in Russia. The triumvirate, alongside several other women, founded the Society for Cheap Lodgings and Other Benefits for the Citizens of St. Petersburg in 1859. The group, focused on assisting needy women and their children, had two factions, the "German party" and the "Russian party", which differed on their preferred approach. (Note: The "Germans" were primarily descended from German or Baltic aristocratic families, according to Richard Stites, a professor of Russian history at Georgetown University.) The "Germans" favored a then-traditional method of philanthropy that involved close supervision of the poor. The "Russians" focused on self-help and direct aid, attempting to avoid patronization and maintain the privacy of those aided. The society underwent "two years of planning and experimentation" before getting underway, according to Stites.

In early 1861, the new organization split in two, with the Stasova–Trubnikova–Filosofova triumvirate leading the "Russians". A charter for their society, now smaller, was approved by the Tsarist government in February 1861. The society soon acquired its own building and a large contract for sewing work from the military. It provided housing and work as seamstresses to its clients (primarily widows and wives whose husbands had abandoned them). The organization also operated a day care center and a communal kitchen. Trubnikova was the first president; Filosofova also served as president of the society for several years before its closure in 1879. Filosofova was clear in her goal, which she once expressed in a letter to Anatoly Koni: "giving women the opportunity for an autonomous path to employment and a morally and materially independent status." She also provided support for a proposed large-scale Society for Women's Labor in 1865, but the organization was never incorporated.

The triumvirate and Anna Engelhardt founded the Russian Women's Publishing Cooperative in 1863. Employing upwards of thirty women, the cooperative focused on writing and translation. It published a wide variety of books, including textbooks, scientific works and children's stories, such as Darwin's On the Origin of Species and Hans Christian Andersen's fairy tales. Although it was initially successful, the cooperative never received governmental approval and suffered financial difficulties after Trubnikova and Stasova went abroad and its bookselling partner went bankrupt. Nevertheless, under Filosofova's management, it lasted until 1879.

=== Women's education ===
In 1867, the triumvirate began pushing for Russian universities to create courses for women. The campaign began with a meeting at Trubnikova's home between scores of interested women and (male) scholars, where a plan of action was agreed upon. The women wrote a petition to Karl Fedorovich Kessler, the rector of the St. Petersburg University. With a particular talent for organizing widespread support, they gathered over 400 signatures among middle- and upper-class women; Filosofova served as chairwoman of the organizing committee. Seeking the establishment of a women's university, the triumvirate received support from Kessler to create "regular, serious courses" open to women, in the words of the historian Christine Johanson.

The next step was to obtain approval from Dmitry Andreyevich Tolstoy, who was responsible for the education system as the Minister of National Enlightenment. However, there was widespread opposition to the education of women. Tolstoy argued that women would abandon education after being married, and dismissed the signatories by stating that they were "sheep" merely following the latest fashion. He rejected the petition in late 1868, stating among other reasons that women were not prepared for advanced instruction. The triumvirate persuaded some academics to offer preparatory lectures, known as the Alarchin Courses, beginning in April 1869. Filosofova also opened a local school at her husband's Bezhanitsy estate, which survived well into the 20th century.

In Tsarist Russia, state policy was poorly coordinated and inconsistent due to the competing interests of rival ministers, and the triumvirate looked for another path to support higher education for women. They appealed to the more liberal war minister Dmitry Alekseyevich Milyutin, who, persuaded by his wife, daughter, and Filosofova, agreed to host medical courses for women in Saint Petersburg. Filosofova's husband was at that time serving as a chief aide to Milyutin. Tolstoy countered by permitting the classes, but at his own quarters, where he could monitor them. The triumvirate continued to push for more opportunities for higher education, and by October 1869, the Russian government, as a compromise, permitted a limited set of lectures for women on advanced subjects (including chemistry, history, anatomy, zoology, and Russian literature). The lectures began in January 1870. Attended by over 700 women, they became known as the Vladimirskii lectures, after their eventual host, the Vladimir college.

The Vladimirskii lectures, although circumscribed, were nevertheless shut down in 1875. Filosofova began a campaign for their reopening. Tolstoy, meanwhile, had become concerned about the number of Russian women going abroad for education, particularly to Switzerland. In April 1876, at Tolstoy and Filosofova's urging, Alexander II permitted the creation of courses for higher education for women, although admission to men's universities was still barred. The resulting Bestuzhev Courses (after their nominal head, Konstantin Bestuzhev-Ryumin) were organized by Stasova and Filosofova. They began in Saint Petersburg in 1878. By 1881, the courses covered a full four-year university schedule. Tolstoy limited the funding available; government support provided only 7 percent of the budget, and tuition was therefore expensive. The radicalism of some of the students led to criticism, and the Bestuzhev Courses were temporarily shut down in 1886, before reopening under stricter government control in 1889.

== Exile and return ==
Filosofova was known for her kindness and generosity, and occasionally provided aid to the families of exiled or imprisoned revolutionaries. Her sympathies were unpopular with Russian officials. In 1879, she was exiled abroad for raising money for groups "connected with Land and Liberty", per Stites, along with other offenses (such as giving her husband's military coat to an internee being deported to Siberia). Filosofova traveled to Wiesbaden in Germany, and was introduced to Theosophy there, becoming a major financial supporter and proponent of the new philosophy. She was only allowed to return to Russia in 1881. After the conservative backlash following the assassination of the Tsar the same year, Filosofova was further isolated, and her husband's official position was also weakened because of her revolutionary connections. The family was forced to live at a lower income level.

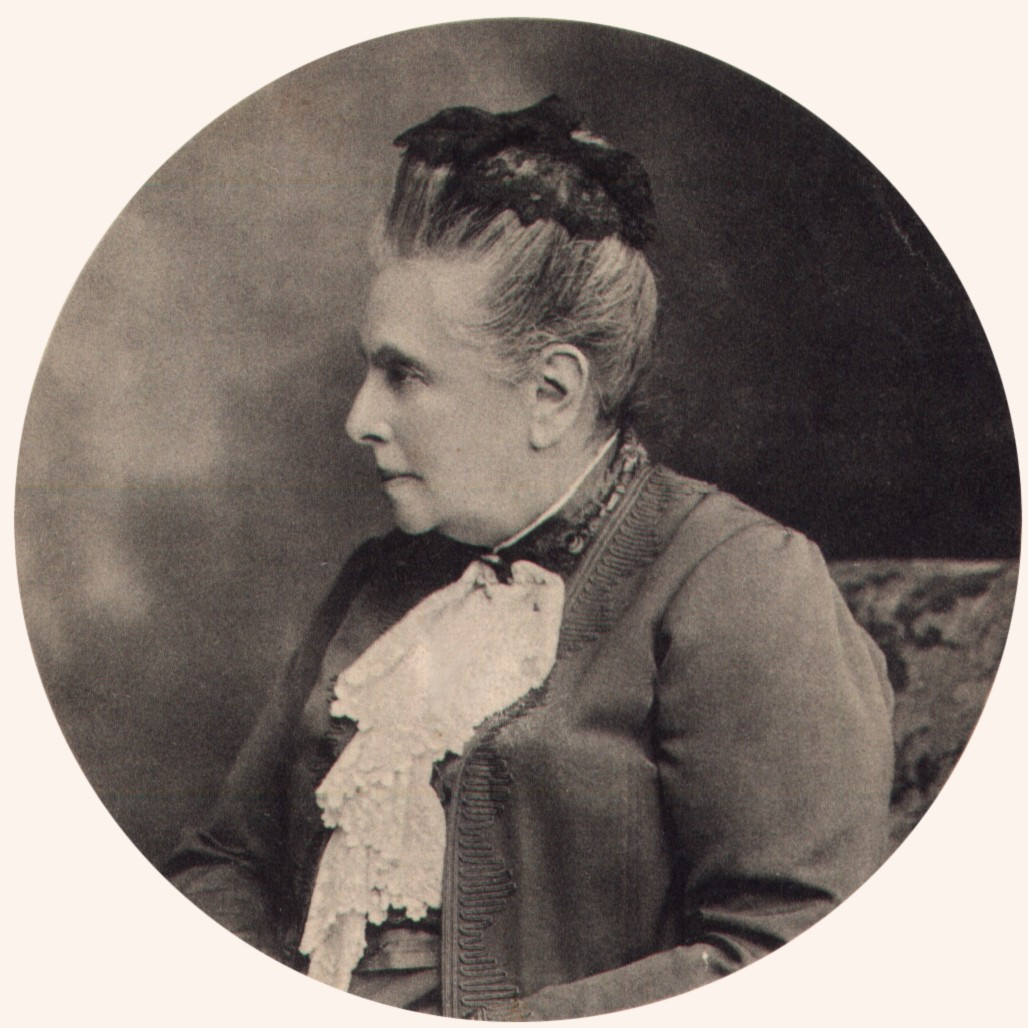
Filosofova in later life

Filosofova resumed her activities at the end of the 1880s, with charitable work to aid the famine-struck Volga Region. In 1892, she joined the Saint Petersburg Committee for the Promotion of Literacy. In 1895, Filosofova, along with Stasova and others, founded the Russian Women's Mutual Philanthropic Society, which, under the restrictive laws of the Tsarist autocracy, was limited to philanthropic ventures such as a kindergarten, hostel, and employment service. Filosofova was recognized by Tsar Nicholas II in 1904 for her work with the Society for Assistance for Higher Women's Courses. In 1905, the universities of Russia were opened to women and the women's university courses were no longer necessary.

=== Revolution of 1905 and acclaim ===
Filosofova was elected chairwoman of the International Council of Women in 1899, attending its meeting in London. She took part in the Russian Revolution of 1905, joining the Constitutional Democratic Party. After the revolution, she helped organize and acted as chairwoman of the first Russian women's congress in 1908. However, Filosofova's goal for the meeting, to unify the Russian women's movement, was largely unrealized. After the congress, Filosofova and some of her associates received hostile letters from the ultra-conservative Duma deputy Vladimir Purishkevich; he called it "an assembly of whores". Filosofova published the letter and took legal action against Purishkevich; he was punished with a month in jail.

By this time one of the most prominent Russian leaders of the theosophical movement, Filosofova served as the philosophy's delegation head to the Congress of Russian Spiritualists in 1906, and two years later helped establish the Russian Theosophical Society. Three years later, in 1911, a celebration was held to commemorate the fiftieth anniversary of the start of Filosofova's career. Scores of women's organizations, both from Russia and beyond, dedicated speeches to Filosofova, while Duma members celebrated her at the Mariinsky Palace. Muravyeva writes that Filosofova had become a "living legend" for younger generations of feminists, as a symbol of progress and the "last living founder" of the movement. (Note: Trubnikova suffered from mental illness and largely retired from active life in 1878, dying in 1897; Stasova died in 1895.) She died in Saint Petersburg on 17 March 1912, and her funeral drew thousands of attendees. She was buried next to her husband in the family crypt at their estate in Bezhanitsy.
