= List of polyglots =

This is a list of notable people with a knowledge of six or more languages.

== Deceased ==
=== Antiquity and Middle Ages ===
- Mithridates VI (135–63 BC), King of Pontus. According to Pliny the Elder, Mithridates could speak the languages of all of the twenty-two nations that he ruled.
- Cleopatra (69–30 BC), Queen of Egypt. According to Plutarch, Cleopatra spoke many languages in addition to her native language, Greek, including Latin, Egyptian, Ethiopian, Trogodyte, and the languages of the Hebraioi, Arabes, Syrians, Medes, and Parthians.
- Al-Farabi (870–950), Islamic philosopher. He was reputed to know seventy languages.
- Frederick II (1194–1250), King of Sicily and Holy Roman Emperor. He knew Sicilian, French, Latin, Greek, German, and Arabic.

=== Modern age, pre-18th century ===
- Mehmed II (1432–1481), Sultan of the Ottoman Empire. In addition to his native language, Turkish, he learnt Arabic, Hebrew, Persian, Latin, and Greek.
- Elizabeth I (1533–1603), Queen of England and Ireland. She is thought to have known English, Welsh, French, Spanish, Italian, Latin, Greek, and some German.
- Athanasius Kircher (1602–1680), German Jesuit scholar. He was said to know twelve languages.
- John Milton (1608–1674), English poet. He knew English, Italian, Latin, Greek, and Hebrew, and to a lesser extent Dutch, French, Spanish, Aramaic, and Syriac.
- Wojciech Bobowski (1610–1675), Polish musician held captive by the Ottoman Empire. He is said to have known Polish, English, German, French, Italian, Latin, Ancient Greek, Persian, Arabic, Hebrew, and Turkish.
- Alexander Mavrokordatos (c. 1641–1709), Ottoman Greek physician and Grand Dragoman of the Porte. He knew Greek, Ottoman Turkish, Arabic, Persian, Latin, Italian, French, Old Church Slavonic, and possibly German.
- Dimitrie Cantemir (1673–1723), Prince of Moldavia. He spoke Romanian, Italian, Latin, Modern Greek, Russian, Persian, Arabic, and Ottoman Turkish, and had an understanding of French, Ancient Greek, and Old Church Slavonic.

=== 18th century ===
- Thomas Jefferson (1743–1826), third president of the United States. He spoke English, French, Italian, and Latin, and could read Spanish and Greek. He may also have had some knowledge of German.
- William Jones (1746–1794), British philologist and jurist. He knew twenty-eight languages to varying degrees: English, Dutch, German, Swedish, Welsh, Russian, French, Spanish, Portuguese, Italian, Latin, Greek, Sanskrit, Pali, Hindi, Bengali, Persian, Middle Persian, Zoroastrian Dari, Arabic, Hebrew, Syriac, Geʽez, Coptic, Turkish, Chinese, Tibetan, and the various forms of early Germanic preserved in runic inscriptions.
- John Oswald (c. 1760–1793), Scottish revolutionary. He learnt Latin and Greek in his youth, and later studied French, Italian, Spanish, Portuguese, and Arabic.
- Giuseppe Caspar Mezzofanti (1774–1849), Italian cardinal. One of his contemporaries recorded that he knew seventy-two languages to varying degrees; another calculated that he knew sixty or sixty-one. Both agreed that there were thirty languages that he had fully mastered: Italian, Spanish, Portuguese, French, Latin, English, Dutch, Flemish, German, Danish, Swedish, Russian, Polish, Czech, Illyrian, Greek, Romaic, Albanian, Ancient Armenian, Modern Armenian, Persian, Hungarian, Turkish, Hebrew, Rabbinical Hebrew, Arabic, Maltese, Aramaic, Coptic, and Chinese.
- Carl Friedrich Gauss (1777–1855), German mathematician. He wrote in Latin and could read Greek. In addition to his native language, German, he knew a number of modern European languages. At the age of sixty-two, he began studying Russian and mastered it within two years.
- Jean-François Champollion (1790–1832), French Egyptologist. He knew Latin, Greek, Sanskrit, Persian, Arabic, Hebrew, Aramaic, Syriac, Amharic, and Coptic.
- Helmuth von Moltke the Elder (1800–1891), Prussian field marshal. He knew seven languages, but was habitually taciturn, so that he was said to be "silent in seven languages". Among the languages he knew were German, English, Danish, French, Italian, and Turkish.

=== 19th century ===
- William Rowan Hamilton (1805–1865), Irish mathematician. Encouraged by his uncle, he learnt many languages while still young, including Latin, Greek, Hindustani, Bengali, Marathi, Sanskrit, Persian, Arabic, Hebrew, Aramaic, Syriac, and Malay.
- Henry Wadsworth Longfellow (1807–1882), American poet. He knew Latin, Italian, French, Spanish, Portuguese, and German. He also had some knowledge of Dutch, Danish, Swedish, Icelandic, and Finnish.
- Jan Prosper Witkiewicz (1808–1839), Polish-Lithuanian explorer and diplomat. He spoke Polish, Russian, English, German, French, Persian, Pashto, Kazakh, and Chagatai Turkish.
- Solomon Caesar Malan (1812–1894), British clergyman. He was conversant with around eighty languages, including German, Spanish, Italian, Latin, Sanskrit, Hebrew, Arabic, Chinese, and Tibetan.
- Otto von Bismarck (1815–1898), Prussian statesman. In addition to his native language, German, he spoke English and French, and to a lesser extent Italian, Russian, Polish, and Plattdeutsch. He also had some knowledge of Latin.
- Herschell Filipowski (1816–1872), Lithuanian-born British actuary and editor. He was conversant with Polish, Russian, German, English, French, Spanish, Latin, Hebrew, Arabic, and Chinese.
- Karl Marx (1818–1883), German political theorist. He spoke German, English, and French, and could read Greek, Latin, Italian, Spanish, Romanian, and Russian.
- C. V. Runganada Sastri (1819–1881), Indian civil servant. The Dictionary of Indian Biography states that he knew English, German, French, Latin, Greek, Persian, Sanskrit, Hindustani, Marathi, Tamil, Malayalam, Kannada, Telugu, Arabic, and some Hebrew. Other sources suggest he also knew Italian.
- Friedrich Engels (1820–1895), German political theorist. He spoke German, English, Danish, French, Italian, and Spanish, and to a lesser extent Russian, Polish, and Romanian. He also studied a number of other languages, including Greek, Latin, Portuguese, Dutch, Frisian, Gothic, Irish, Czech, Slovenian, Serbian, Persian, Hebrew, Turkish, and Japanese.
- Richard Francis Burton (1821–1890), British explorer and writer. He knew twenty-nine languages and eleven dialects, including Greek, Latin, Italian, Spanish, French, Provençal, Béarnais, Persian, Sanskrit, Hindustani, Gujarati, Punjabi, Sindhi, Marathi, Telugu, Toda, Arabic, Somali, and Swahili.
- Heinrich Schliemann (1822–1890), German businessman and archaeologist. He knew eighteen languages, including German, Dutch, English, French, Italian, Spanish, Portuguese, and Russian.
- Herman Neubronner van der Tuuk (1824–1894), Dutch linguist. He knew a wide range of languages, including Malay, Javanese, Malagasy, Chinese, Arabic, Persian, Sanskrit, Latin, and Greek.
- Pedro II (1825–1891), last emperor of Brazil. He spoke Portuguese, Spanish, French, Italian, Latin, German, Hebrew, and Tupi-Guarani, and could read Provençal, Greek, Sanskrit, and Arabic.
- Pashko Vasa (1825–1892), Albanian writer. He spoke Albanian, Italian, French, Greek, and Turkish. He also knew some English and Serbo-Croatian, and in his later years learnt Arabic.
- Georg Sauerwein (1831–1904), German translator and private tutor. He spoke and wrote twenty-six languages.
- Pétrus Ký (1837–1898), Vietnamese scholar. He spoke eight languages and had reasonable competence in several others.
- James Murray (1837–1915), Scottish lexicographer. He was familiar with a wide range of languages and dialects, including Latin, Italian, Spanish, Portuguese, French, Catalan, Provençal, Vaudois, Anglo-Saxon, Mœso-Gothic, German, Dutch, Flemish, Danish, Russian, Persian, Sanskrit, Hebrew, Syriac, Aramaic, Phoenician, and Coptic.
- Nikodim Milaš (1845–1915), Serbian Orthodox bishop and saint. He could read Serbian, Russian, German, English, French, Italian, Latin, and Greek.
- Naim Frashëri (1846–1900), Albanian writer. He wrote in Albanian, Greek, Persian, and Turkish. He also knew French, Italian, and Arabic.
- Sami Frashëri (1850–1904), Albanian writer. He knew Albanian, Greek, French, Italian, Persian, Arabic, and Turkish.
- Eduardo Toda y Güell (1852–1941), Spanish diplomat. He spoke seven languages.
- Emilio Kosterlitzky (1853–1928), Russian-born Mexican soldier. He spoke Russian, Polish, Spanish, French, Italian, English, German, Danish, and Swedish.
- Arthur Rimbaud (1854–1891), French poet. He spoke and wrote five European languages: French, Italian, Spanish, English, and German. He also knew Arabic, Amharic, Harari, Oromo, and Somali, and may have had some knowledge of Argobba, Tigrinya, and a now-extinct language named Kotou.
- Robert Dick Wilson (1856–1930), American Bible scholar. He learnt twenty-six languages and dialects, including Latin, Italian, French, Spanish, Portuguese, German, Hebrew, Aramaic, Syriac, and Arabic.
- Nikola Tesla (1856–1943), Serbian-American inventor. He spoke eight languages, including Serbo-Croatian, English, German, French, and Italian.
- Heinrich von Coudenhove-Kalergi (1859–1906), Austro-Hungarian diplomat. He spoke sixteen languages, including Japanese, Russian, Turkish, and Hebrew.
- L. L. Zamenhof (1859–1917), creator of Esperanto. He spoke Russian, Polish, Yiddish, German, and French natively or at a native level. He also spoke English, but not well. He knew four classical languages, Latin, Greek, Hebrew, and Aramaic, and two constructed languages, Volapük and Esperanto, and may have had some knowledge of Italian and Lithuanian.
- José Rizal (1861–1896), Filipino writer and nationalist. He spoke or could read Tagalog, Visayan, Ilocano, Cebuano, Subanen, Malay, Spanish, Portuguese, Italian, French, Catalan, Latin, English, Dutch, German, Swedish, Russian, Greek, Sanskrit, Hebrew, Arabic, Japanese, and Chinese.
- Emil Krebs (1867–1930), German diplomat. By the time he left school, he could speak twelve languages. In 1914, he calculated that he could translate to and from German in thirty-two languages. Later he was said to know sixty or sixty-five languages, including English, Dutch, Icelandic, Norwegian, Danish, Swedish, Latin, Italian, Spanish, Portuguese, French, Catalan, Romanian, Russian, Ukrainian, Polish, Czech, Slovak, Serbo-Croatian, Slovenian, Bulgarian, Lithuanian, Latvian, Irish, Greek, Albanian, Armenian, Persian, Sanskrit, Hindi, Urdu, Gujarati, Hungarian, Finnish, Estonian, Georgian, Basque, Arabic, Hebrew, Syriac, Assyrian, Babylonian, Sumerian, Coptic, Swahili, Turkish, Tatar, Mongolian, Manchu, Japanese, Korean, Chinese, Tibetan, Burmese, Thai, Malay, and Javanese.
- Minakata Kumagusu (1867–1941), Japanese scholar. He could read eighteen or nineteen languages, including Latin, Greek, Persian, and Arabic.
- Rıza Tevfik Bölükbaşı (1869–1949), Turkish politician. He knew Turkish, English, German, French, Spanish, Italian, Latin, Albanian, Armenian, Persian, Arabic, and Hebrew.
- Ahatanhel Krymsky (1871–1942), Ukrainian scholar. At the age of twenty-five, he was proficient in seventeen languages.
- Sri Aurobindo (1872–1950), Indian philosopher. He could speak, read, and write Bengali, English, and French; read and write Sanskrit, Latin, and Greek; speak and read Gujarati, Marathi, and Hindi; and read German, Italian, and Spanish.
- Harold Williams (1876–1928), New Zealand journalist. He knew more than forty languages, including Maori, Samoan, Tongan, Fijian, Ilocano, Russian, Ukrainian, Polish, Old Church Slavonic, Lithuanian, Latvian, Greek, Armenian, Persian, Sanskrit, Hungarian, Finnish, Estonian, Georgian, Turkish, Tatar, Buryat, Japanese, and Chinese.
- Hrachia Acharian (1876–1953), Armenian linguist. Among the languages he knew were Armenian, Greek, English, German, French, Italian, Latin, Persian, Sanskrit, Hebrew, and Laz.
- Harinath De (1877–1911), Indian scholar. He knew Hindi, Urdu, Bengali, Oriya, Marathi, Gujarati, Sanskrit, Pali, Persian, German, French, Spanish, Italian, Latin, Greek, and Arabic. He also had some knowledge of Danish, Dutch, Anglo-Saxon, Old and Middle High German, Portuguese, Romanian, Provençal, Hebrew, Turkish, and Chinese.
- Martin Buber (1878–1965), Austrian philosopher. He spoke German, Yiddish, English, French, Italian, Polish, and Hebrew, and could read Dutch, Spanish, Latin, and Greek.
- Muhammad Shahidullah (1885–1969), Bengali linguist. He knew twenty-four languages.
- Ho Chi Minh (1890–1969), Vietnamese statesman. In addition to his native language, Vietnamese, he knew French, English, Russian, Cantonese, and Mandarin.
- Ahmad Kasravi (1890–1946), Iranian scholar. He knew Persian, Middle Persian, Armenian, English, Arabic, and Esperanto.
- J. R. R. Tolkien (1892–1973), British writer. Among modern languages, he knew German, French, Spanish, Italian, Welsh, and Finnish; among pre-modern languages, he knew Old English, Middle English, Old Norse, Gothic, Latin, Greek, and Medieval Welsh. He also had a working knowledge of Lombardic, Dutch, Danish, Norwegian, Swedish, Russian, and Serbian.
- Edmund Wilson (1895–1972), American literary critic. He studied French and Italian at university, and later learnt to read German, Russian, Hebrew, and some Hungarian.
- Roman Jakobson (1896–1982), Russian linguist. He knew around twenty languages, including Russian, Czech, Bulgarian, French, and German.
- William James Sidis (1898–1944), American child prodigy. He knew English, German, Russian, French, Latin, Greek, Armenian, and Turkish.
- Paul Robeson (1898–1976), American singer and activist. He spoke ten languages, including Russian, German, French, Spanish, and Chinese, and had knowledge of a further ten. He sang in more than fifty languages.

=== 20th century ===
==== 1900s ====
- Sukarno (1901–1970), Indonesian politician. He spoke Javanese, Sundanese, Balinese, Indonesian, Dutch, German, English, French, Arabic, and Japanese.
- Dora Bloch (1902–1976), Israeli hostage. She spoke Hebrew, Arabic, Russian, German, English, and Italian.
- Steven Runciman (1903–2000), British historian. He began learning French, Latin, Greek, and Russian at a young age, and later learnt Bulgarian, Old Church Slavonic, Armenian, and some Turkish. He may also have had some knowledge of Arabic and a number of other languages.
- John von Neumann (1903–1957), Hungarian mathematician. He spoke Hungarian, English, German, and French, and also knew Latin and Greek.
- Syed Mujtaba Ali (1904–1974), Bangladeshi writer. He knew Bengali, Urdu, Hindi, Gujarati, Marathi, Sanskrit, Persian, Pashto, English, German, French, Italian, and Arabic.
- Pent Nurmekund (1906–1996), Estonian linguist. He could read over eighty languages and could speak a great many of them.
- H. S. David (1907–1981) Sri Lankan priest. He reportedly knew thirty-three languages: Tamil, Telugu, Kannada, Malayalam, Tulu, Kui, Brahui, Sinhalese, Hindi, Vedic, Sanskrit, Prakrit, Pali, Avestan, English, Dutch, German, Danish, Norwegian, Swedish, French, Spanish, Portuguese, Italian, Latin, Greek, Lithuanian, Russian, Malay, Arabic, Hebrew, Assyrian, and Sumerian.
- Muhammad Hamidullah (1908–2002), stateless scholar. He knew ten languages and published works in seven of them (Urdu, Persian, English, German, French, Arabic, and Turkish).
- João Guimarães Rosa (1908–1967), Brazilian novelist. He spoke Portuguese, Spanish, Italian, French, English, German, Esperanto, and some Russian, and could read with the aid of a dictionary Swedish, Dutch, Latin, and Greek. He studied the grammar of a number of other languages, including Sanskrit, Lithuanian, Polish, Czech, Danish, Finnish, Hungarian, Arabic, Hebrew, Japanese, and Tupi.
- Kató Lomb (1909–2003), Hungarian interpreter. She spoke Hungarian, Russian, German, English, and French, and to a lesser extent Spanish, Italian, Polish, Japanese, and Chinese. She could also translate from Dutch, Swedish, Norwegian, Danish, Ukrainian, Czech, Bulgarian, Romanian, Portuguese, and Latin.
- Uku Masing (1909–1985), Estonian scholar. He reputedly knew around sixty-five languages.

==== 1910s ====
- Hugh Nibley (1910–2005), American scholar. He knew fourteen languages.
- Lyuba Kutincheva (1910–1998), Bulgarian traveller. She spoke Bulgarian, Russian, Romanian, French, Turkish, Arabic, and Esperanto.
- Enoch Powell (1912–1998), British politician and classical scholar. He spoke English, German, French, Italian, Modern Greek, and Urdu, and had a reading knowledge of Spanish, Portuguese, Russian, and Welsh. Among classical languages, he knew Ancient Greek, Latin, Hebrew, and Aramaic.
- George L. Campbell (1912–2004), British linguist. He spoke forty-four languages and had a working knowledge of perhaps twenty others.
- Meredith Gardner (1912–2002), American linguist and codebreaker. He spoke German, French, Italian, Spanish, Russian, Lithuanian, and Japanese, and could read Latin, Greek, Sanskrit, Old High German, Middle High German, and Old Church Slavonic.
- Willy Brandt (1913–1992), German politician. He spoke German, English, Norwegian, Swedish, French, and Italian.
- Toshihiko Izutsu (1914–1993), Japanese scholar. He knew more than thirty languages, including Arabic, Hebrew, Turkish, Persian, Sanskrit, Pali, Hindustani, Russian, Greek, and Chinese.
- Aziz Ahmad (1914–1978), Pakistani novelist. He spoke Urdu, Persian, English, German, French, Italian, Arabic, and Turkish.
- Charles Berlitz (1914–2003), American publisher and author. He learnt to speak English, German, French, and Spanish as a child, and ultimately came to speak thirty-two languages with varying degrees of fluency.
- Vernon A. Walters (1917–2002), American soldier and diplomat. He spoke English, Dutch, German, French, Italian, Spanish, Portuguese, and Russian.
- Anthony Burgess (1917–1993), British novelist and composer. He spoke English, German, French, Italian, Spanish, Russian, Chinese, and Malay.
- Nabi Bakhsh Baloch (1917–2011), Pakistani scholar. He wrote in Sindhi, Seraiki, Urdu, Balochi, Persian, English, and Arabic.
- Henryk Szeryng (1918–1988), Polish violinist. He spoke Polish, English, German, French, Italian, Spanish, and Portuguese.
- Omeljan Pritsak (1919–2006), Ukrainian scholar. He spoke twelve languages.
- Shūichi Katō (1919–2008), Japanese scholar. He spoke Japanese, Chinese, English, German, French, and Italian.
- Fazlur Rahman Malik (1919–1988), Pakistani scholar. In addition to his native language, Urdu, he knew Arabic, Persian, English, German, French, Latin, and Ancient Greek.

==== 1920s ====
- Pope John Paul II (1920–2005), former leader of the Catholic Church. In addition to his native language, Polish, he knew Latin, Italian, Spanish, Portuguese, French, English, and German.
- Ahmad Hasan Dani (1920–2009), Pakistani archaeologist. He spoke fifteen languages, including French, Tamil, and Turkish.
- Peter Ustinov (1921–2004), British actor. He spoke English, German, French, Italian, Spanish, and Russian, and had some knowledge of Greek and Turkish.
- Alessandro Bausani (1921–1988), Italian scholar. He had a good knowledge of as many as thirty languages, including Persian, Urdu, Arabic, Turkish, Indonesian, and Basque.
- P. V. Narasimha Rao (1921–2004), Indian politician. He spoke seventeen languages, including English, German, Spanish, and French.
- Max Mangold (1922–2015), Swiss linguist. He spoke almost forty languages.
- Christopher Lee (1922–2015), British actor. He spoke English, German, French, Italian, and Spanish, and had some knowledge of Swedish, Russian, and Greek.
- Michael Ventris (1922–1956), British architect and decipherer of Linear B. By the age of ten, he spoke English, German, Swiss German, French, and Polish. As an adult, he learnt Swedish, Danish, Italian, Spanish, Russian, Modern Greek, and some Turkish.
- Stephen Wurm (1922–2001), Hungarian-born Australian linguist. "He was a genuine rapid language learner, and before he was 40, was fluent in five of the Germanic languages, five of the Romance languages, three Slavic languages, in Arabic, Swahili, Turkish, Uzbek, Mongol, Mandarin, Tok Pisin, and Police Motu, and could get by in perhaps 30 other languages—over 50 in all."
- Jambuvijaya (1923–2009), Jain monk. He could read twenty-two languages, including Sanskrit, French, German, and Japanese.
- Pope Benedict XVI (1927–2022), former leader of the Catholic Church. In addition to his native language, German, he spoke English, Italian, French, Spanish, and Latin, and could read Ancient Greek and Biblical Hebrew.
- Hans Eberstark (1929–2001), Austrian interpreter. He interpreted into English and German from Dutch, French, Italian, Spanish, and Catalan. He also had some knowledge of Portuguese, Danish, Swedish, Norwegian, Surinamese Creole, Haitian Creole, Papiamento, Yiddish, several varieties of Swiss German, Albanian, Hebrew, and Amharic.

==== 1930s ====
- Jo Bonnier (1930–1972), Swedish racing driver. He spoke six languages.
- Barry Farber (1930–2020), American radio host. When inducted into the army, he qualified for work in fourteen languages. He had some knowledge of twenty-five languages in total.
- George Fernandes (1930–2019), Indian politician. In addition to his mother tongue, Konkani, he spoke Marathi, Hindi, Urdu, English, Tamil, Malayalam, Kannada, and Tulu. He also knew Latin.
- P. B. Sreenivas (1930–2013), Indian singer. He spoke eight languages, including Kannada, Urdu, and English.
- Abdul Rahman Ghassemlou (1930–1989), Iranian politician. He spoke Kurdish, Persian, English, German, French, Russian, Czech, Slovak, Turkish, Azerbaijani, and Arabic.
- Jon Elia (1931–2002), Pakistani poet. He knew Urdu, Sanskrit, Persian, English, Arabic, and Hebrew.
- Corazon Aquino (1933–2009), former president of the Philippines. She spoke Kapampangan, Tagalog, English, Spanish, French, and Japanese.
- Kenneth L. Hale (1934–2001), American linguist. He spoke over fifty languages, including Spanish, Portuguese, French, Dutch, Irish, Polish, Basque, Turkish, Hebrew, Chinese, Japanese, Navajo, Jemez, Hopi, Oʼodham, Wômpanâak, Ulwa, Miskitu, Warlpiri, and Lardil.
- Jeong Su-il (1934–2025), Chinese-born North Korean spy. He spoke Korean, Chinese, Japanese, Tagalog, Malay, Arabic, Persian, Russian, French, Spanish, German, and English.
- William Fulco (1936–2021), American Jesuit priest and scholar. He knew nine languages, including Latin, Greek, German, Aramaic, and Hebrew.
- Pope Francis (1936–2025), former leader of the Catholic Church. Born in Argentina and of Italian descent, he spoke Spanish and Italian natively. In addition, he knew Latin, and could converse in German, French, Portuguese, and English.
- Madeleine Albright (1937–2022), former U.S. secretary of state. She spoke Czech, Polish, Serbo-Croatian, Russian, English, German, and French.
- Ivan Argüelles (1939–2024), American poet. He knew most of the Romance languages (including Spanish, French, Italian, Portuguese, Catalan, Provençal, and Romanian) and a number of Indic languages (Hindi, Bengali, Sinhala, and Nepali), as well as Persian, German, Russian, Arabic, and some Chinese. He also studied Latin, Ancient Greek, Sanskrit, Old Scandinavian, and Old Icelandic.

==== Post-1930s ====
- Michael Henry Heim (1943–2012), American literary translator. He knew twelve languages and translated from eight of them: Russian, Czech, Serbo-Croatian, German, Dutch, French, Romanian, and Hungarian.
- John Boswell (1947–1994), American historian. He spoke or read several Scandinavian languages, Old Icelandic, German, French, Spanish, Italian, Latin, Greek, early and modern Russian, Old Church Slavonic, Armenian, Persian, Arabic, Hebrew, Syriac, and Akkadian.
- Daniel Kane (1948–2021), Australian linguist. He knew English, Italian, French, Spanish, Latin, Russian, Chinese, Jurchen, Khitan, and Esperanto.
- J. Jayalalithaa (1948–2016), Indian politician and actress. She spoke Tamil, Malayalam, Kannada, Telugu, Hindi, and English.
- Robert Hübner (1948–2025), German chess grandmaster. He spoke a dozen languages.
- Sergei Starostin (1953–2005), Russian linguist. He spoke Russian, Polish, English, German, and French, and could read a further thirteen Slavic languages, as well as Chinese, Japanese, Dutch, Spanish, Italian, Latin, Greek, and Sanskrit. Through his research, he had some knowledge of a wide range of other languages.
- Dikembe Mutombo (1966–2024), Congolese basketball player. He spoke English, French, Spanish, Portuguese, Tshiluba, Swahili, Lingala, and two other Central African languages.
- Shahab Ahmed (1966–2015), Pakistani scholar. He mastered around fifteen languages.
- Moses McCormick (1981–2021), American YouTuber. He spoke around twenty languages at a basic conversational level.

== Living ==
=== Africa ===
- Peter Turkson (1948–), Ghanaian Catholic cardinal. In addition to his native language, Fante, he speaks a number of other Ghanaian languages, as well as English, French, Italian, German, and Hebrew. He also knows Latin and Greek.
- Mohamoud Dirir Gheddi (1959–) Ethiopian politician. He speaks Somali, Oromo, Amharic, Harari, Arabic, English, French, and some Tigrigna.
- Trevor Noah (1984–), South African comedian. He speaks English, Afrikaans, Zulu, Xhosa, Tswana, Tsonga, and some German.

=== Asia ===
- Lokesh Chandra (1927–), Indian scholar. He knows Sanskrit, Pali, Hindi, Avestan, Old Persian, Greek, Latin, French, German, English, Russian, Chinese, Tibetan, Mongolian, Japanese, and Indonesian.
- Mickey Curtis (1938–), Japanese actor and singer. He speaks Japanese, English, German, French, Italian, and Thai.
- Bartholomew I (1940–), Ecumenical Patriarch of Constantinople. He knows Turkish, Greek, English, German, French, Italian, and Latin.
- Levon Ter-Petrosyan (1945–), former president of Armenia. He speaks Armenian, Russian, French, English, German, Arabic, and Assyrian. He also knows a number of ancient languages.
- Gloria Macapagal Arroyo (1947–), former president of the Philippines. She speaks Tagalog, Kapampangan, Ilocano, Cebuano, Spanish, and English.
- Malcolm Ranjith (1947–), current archbishop of Colombo. He speaks Sinhala, English, German, French, Spanish, Italian, Tamil, and Indonesian. He also knows Latin, Greek, and Hebrew.
- Péter Frankl (1953–), Hungarian mathematician, now living in Japan. He speaks eleven languages, including Hungarian, Japanese, Chinese, English, and French.
- Kamal Haasan (1954–), Indian actor. He speaks Tamil, Malayalam, Kannada, Telugu, Hindi, Marathi, and English.
- Shabnam Mausi (1955–), Indian politician. She speaks twelve languages.
- Naela Chohan (1958–), Pakistani diplomat. She speaks Urdu, Punjabi, Bengali, Persian, English, French, and Spanish.
- Prakash Raj (1965–), Indian actor. He speaks Kannada, Tulu, Tamil, Malayalam, Telugu, Hindi, and English.
- Hikmat Hasanov (1975–), Azerbaijani military officer. He speaks Azerbaijani, Turkish, Armenian, Russian, English, and Persian.
- Asin Thottumkal (1985–) Indian actress. She speaks Malayalam, Tamil, Telugu, Hindi, English, and French.
- Priya Anand (1986–), Indian actress. She speaks Tamil, Telugu, Hindi, Bengali, Marathi, Spanish, and English.
- Henrikh Mkhitaryan (1989–), Armenian footballer. He speaks Armenian, Russian, English, German, French, and Portuguese.

=== Europe ===
- John C. Wells (1939–), British phonetician. He studied Latin and Ancient Greek at university, and speaks English, German, Welsh, French, Spanish, Italian, Modern Greek, and Esperanto with varying degrees of fluency. He also has some knowledge of Polish, Russian, Swedish, Danish, Norwegian, and Japanese.
- Werner Herzog (1942–), German filmmaker. In addition to his native Bavarian, he knows German, English, Ancient Greek, Modern Greek, Latin, Spanish, French, and some Italian.
- Queen Silvia of Sweden (1943–), spouse of King Carl XVI Gustaf. The daughter of a German father and a Brazilian mother, she speaks German and Portuguese natively. She also knows Spanish, French, English, and Swedish, and has some knowledge of Swedish sign language.
- André Rieu (1949–), Dutch violinist and conductor. He speaks Dutch, English, German, French, Spanish, and Italian.
- Arsène Wenger (1949–), French football manager. He speaks French, German, English, Spanish, and Italian, and has some knowledge of Japanese.
- Noel Malcolm (1956–), British historian. He speaks most Western and Eastern European languages.
- Ranga Yogeshwar (1959–), Luxembourgish physicist and science journalist. He speaks Luxembourgish, German, English, French, Hindi, Tamil, Kannada, and Malayalam.
- Johan Vandewalle (1960–), Belgian linguist. In 1987, at the age of twenty-six, he won the Polyglot of Flanders/Babel Prize, after demonstrating communicative competence in nineteen languages (Arabic, Azerbaijani, Bashkir, Dutch, English, French, German, Italian, Kyrgyz, Persian, Russian, Swahili, Tajik, Tatar, Turkish, Turkmen, Tuvan, Uyghur, and Uzbek).
- Frans Timmermans (1961–), Dutch politician. He speaks Dutch, English, German, French, Italian, and Russian.
- Sigrid Kaag (1961–), Dutch politician. She speaks Dutch, English, German, French, Spanish, and Arabic.
- Elia Wallgrén (1961–), Finnish Orthodox archbishop. He speaks Finnish, Estonian, Swedish, English, German, Spanish, Czech, Polish, and Russian with varying degrees of fluency.
- José Mourinho (1963–), Portuguese football manager. He speaks Portuguese, Spanish, Italian, French, Catalan, and English.
- Ioannis Ikonomou (1964–), translator at the European Commission. He speaks thirty-two modern languages, including twenty-one of the twenty-four official languages of the European Union (the three exceptions being Estonian, Maltese, and Irish). Among the other languages that he speaks are Russian, Bengali, Persian, Turkish, Arabic, Hebrew, Amharic, and Mandarin. He has also studied a number of ancient languages, such as Old Church Slavonic, Classical Armenian, Sanskrit, Sogdian, and Assyro-Babylonian.
- Karin Kneissl (1965–), Austrian diplomat and politician. She speaks German, English, French, Italian, Spanish, and Arabic, and has some knowledge of Russian, Hungarian, and Hebrew.
- Connie Nielsen (1965–), Danish actress. She speaks Danish, Norwegian, Swedish, English, German, French, Italian, and some Spanish.
- Anatoly Moskvin (1966–), Russian linguist, arrested in 2011 after twenty-six mummified bodies were discovered in his home. He has studied thirteen languages.
- Mikheil Saakashvili (1967–), former president of Georgia. He speaks Georgian, Russian, Ukrainian, English, and French, and has some command of Spanish and Ossetian.
- Gianni Infantino (1970–), current president of FIFA. Born in Switzerland to Italian parents, he speaks Italian, French, and Swiss German natively. He also knows English, Spanish, Portuguese, and Arabic.
- Toto Wolff (1972–), Austrian motorsport executive. He speaks German, English, French, Italian, Spanish, and Polish.
- Željko Joksimović (1972–), Serbian singer-songwriter. He speaks Serbian, Russian, Polish, Greek, English, and French.
- Clarence Seedorf (1976–), Dutch footballer. He speaks Dutch, English, Italian, Portuguese, Spanish, and Surinamese.
- Vladimir Samsonov (1976–), Belarusian table tennis player. He speaks Belarusian, Russian, Serbian, English, German, and Spanish.
- Richard Simcott (1977–), British language consultant. He speaks sixteen languages (English, French, Spanish, Welsh, German, Macedonian, Swedish, Italian, Serbian, Portuguese, Czech, Catalan, Russian, Dutch, Romanian, and Albanian) and can use around fifty languages in total to some degree.
- Zdeno Chára (1977–), Slovak ice hockey player. He speaks Slovak, Czech, Polish, Russian, Swedish, German, and English.
- Daniel Tammet (1979–), British author. In his book Born on a Blue Day, he states that he knows ten languages: English, German, Icelandic, French, Spanish, Romanian, Welsh, Lithuanian, Finnish, and Esperanto.
- Victor Bayda (c. 1981–), Russian linguist. He speaks Russian, Irish, Scottish Gaelic, Welsh, Icelandic, Swedish, English, Dutch, German, and French.
- Philip Crowther (1981–), Luxembourgish journalist. He speaks Luxembourgish, German, English, French, Spanish, and Portuguese.
- Mikel Arteta (1982–), Spanish football manager. He speaks Basque, Spanish, Catalan, Portuguese, French, Italian, and English.
- Novak Djokovic (1987–), Serbian tennis player. He speaks Serbian, English, German, French, Italian, and Spanish.
- Ivan Rakitić (1988–), Croatian footballer. He speaks Croatian, English, German, French, Italian, and Spanish.
- Miralem Pjanić (1990–), Bosnian footballer. He speaks Bosnian, Luxembourgish, German, English, French, and Italian.
- Romelu Lukaku (1993–), Belgian footballer. He speaks Dutch, English, German, French, Spanish, Portuguese, Italian, and Lingala.

=== North America ===
- Powell Janulus (1939–), Canadian court interpreter. According to the 1986 Guinness Book of World Records, he "has worked with 41 languages in the Provincial Court of British Columbia, Vancouver, Canada."
- Stephen Krashen (1941–), American linguist. He knows English, German, Yiddish, Spanish, French, Hebrew, and Amharic.
- Steve Kaufmann (1945–), Canadian businessman. He has some understanding of twenty languages, although his ability to speak and write these languages varies to a considerable degree. Some of the languages he has studied are French, Spanish, Portuguese, German, Swedish, Russian, Japanese, Mandarin, and Cantonese.
- Pope Leo XIV (1955–), leader of the Catholic Church. He speaks English, Italian, Spanish, Portuguese, and French, and can read Latin and German.
- Viggo Mortensen (1958–), Danish-American actor. He grew up bilingual in English and Spanish, and later learnt Danish, Italian, and French. He also has some knowledge of Arabic.
- Julie Payette (1963–), former governor general of Canada. She speaks French and English natively, and can converse in Spanish, Italian, Russian, and German.
- Alexander Argüelles (1964–), American linguist. He speaks most of the Germanic and Romance languages (in particular, German, Dutch, Swedish, French, Spanish, Portuguese, and Italian), as well as Russian, Korean, and Arabic, and he has a reading knowledge of many more languages, such as Persian and Old Norse.
- Alberto Lati (1978–), Mexican sports journalist. He speaks Spanish, English, Hebrew, Portuguese, German, Italian, Mandarin, Japanese, French, Greek, and Zulu with varying degrees of fluency.
- Pete Buttigieg (1982–), American politician. He speaks English, Norwegian, Spanish, French, Italian, Maltese, Arabic, and Dari with varying degrees of fluency.
- Zohran Mamdani (1991–), American politician. He speaks English, Spanish, Hindi/Urdu, Bengali, Luganda, and Arabic with varying degrees of fluency.
- Timothy Doner (1995–), American foreign-policy analyst. He speaks English, German, French, Persian, Arabic, and Hebrew, and has some knowledge of a number of other languages, including Dutch, Yiddish, Italian, Latin, Russian, Croatian, Hindi, Pashto, Kurdish, Turkish, Indonesian, Mandarin, Hausa, Swahili, Xhosa, and Ojibwe.

=== Oceania ===
- Sam Lim (1961–), Malaysian-born Australian politician. He can speak ten languages, including Malay, Indonesian, Mandarin, and Burmese.
- Ghil'ad Zuckermann (1971–), Israeli linguist, now living in Australia. He can speak eleven languages, and has some knowledge of eleven more.

=== South America ===
- Martha Argerich (1941–), Argentine pianist. She speaks Spanish, Portuguese, French, Italian, German, and English.
- Ziad Fazah (1954–), Liberian-born Lebanese language teacher, now living in Brazil. He is famous for claiming to speak more than fifty languages, and for a time was listed in The Guinness Book of Records. It is unclear how many languages he can in fact speak.
- Andrew Divoff (1955–), Venezuelan actor and producer. He speaks Spanish, Portuguese, Catalan, French, Italian, English, German, and Russian. At one time he also knew Romanian, but forgot it through lack of use.
- Sérgio Meira (1968–), Brazilian linguist. He speaks Portuguese, French, Italian, Spanish, Romanian, English, German, and Esperanto, and to a lesser extent Catalan, Dutch, Russian, and Tiriyó. He can read with a dictionary Swedish, Latin, and Greek (both classical and modern), and has considerable knowledge of Volapük.
- Shakira (1977–), Colombian singer. She speaks Spanish, Portuguese, Catalan, French, Italian, and English with varying degrees of fluency.
