= Pskov electoral district =

Pskov
- Former Civilian constituency for the All-Russian Constituent Assembly
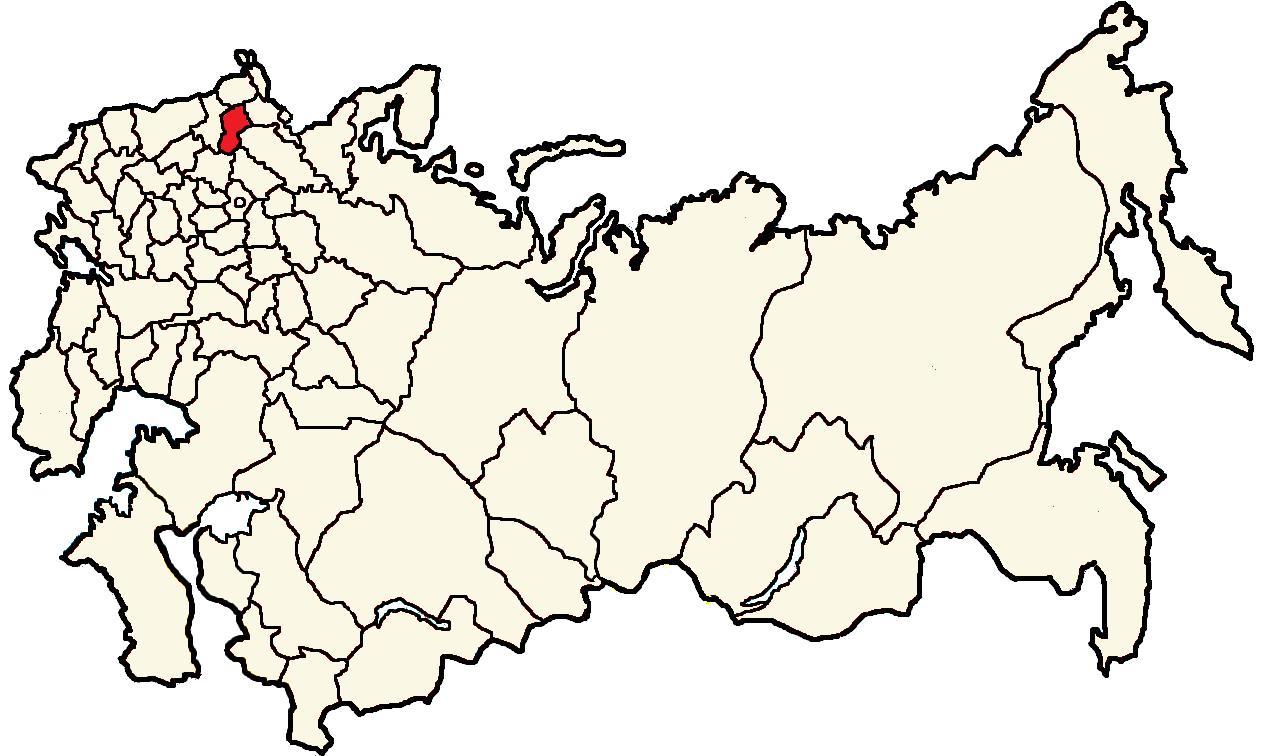

Former constituency
- Created: 1917
- Abolished: 1918
- Number of members: 8
- Number of Uyezd Electoral Commissions: 8
- Number of Urban Electoral Commissions: 1
- Number of Parishes: 136

The Pskov electoral district (Russian: Псковский избирательный округ) was a constituency created for the 1917 Russian Constituent Assembly election. The electoral district covered the Pskov Governorate.

== Electorate ==
At the time of the election Pskov Governorate had an estimated population of 1,264,900. The great majority lived in rural areas, the Governorate had some 120,000 town-dwellers. The number of eligible voters were some 854,000.

== District Election Commission ==
Per the electoral regulation the District Election Commission should have been chaired by the head of the newly elected provincial zemstvo, but no such election had been held. Instead, the Pskov District Election Commission was chaired by S. M. Schilling, member of the Pskov District Court. The Commission held its first meeting on September 9, 1917, and elected local Kadet leader A. P. Melnikov as Deputy Commission Chairman. 8 uezd-level local election commissions were formed.

The district was divided into precincts: Pskov city 6 precincts, Pskov uezd 138, Ostrov town 1, Ostrov uezd 12, Porkhov town 1, Soltsy town 1, Porkhov uezd 22, Velikiye Luki town 6, Velikiye Luki uezd 137, Toropets town 2, Toropets uezd 18, Novorzhev town 1, Novorzhev uezd 90, Kholm town 1, Kholm uezd 177, Opochka town 1, Prigorod Krasny 1 and Opochka uezd 15.

== Candidates ==
The 2nd Pskov Provincial Congress of Soviets of Soldiers and Workers' Deputies was held on September 26–28, 1917 and the 2nd Pskov Provincial Congress of Soviets of Peasants Deputies was held October 6–10, 1917. Socialist-Revolutionary Party leaders Victor Chernov and Catherine Breshkovsky addressed the peasants' congress. At these and other meetings preparations for the elections and drafting of candidate lists were done.

Out of 13 lists that were submitted to the electoral authorities, 4 were barred from contesting. The accepted lists were,

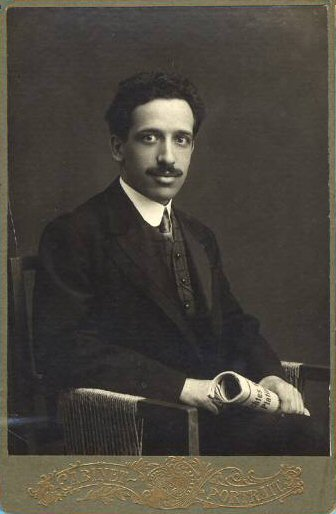
List No. 1 - Popular Socialists (Trudoviks) - List was headed by Pyotr Shaskolsky (pictured), head of the National Division at the Ministry of Internal Affairs, Assistant Professor at Petrograd University and a Central Committee member of the party. Other prominent candidates included the Provincial Commissar I. N. Nikitin, the town mayor of N. S. Arbuzov and the Northern Front commissar D. V. Savitsky.

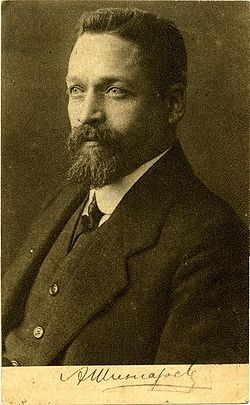
List No. 2 - Kadets - List was headed by Andrei Ivanovich Shingarev (pictured).

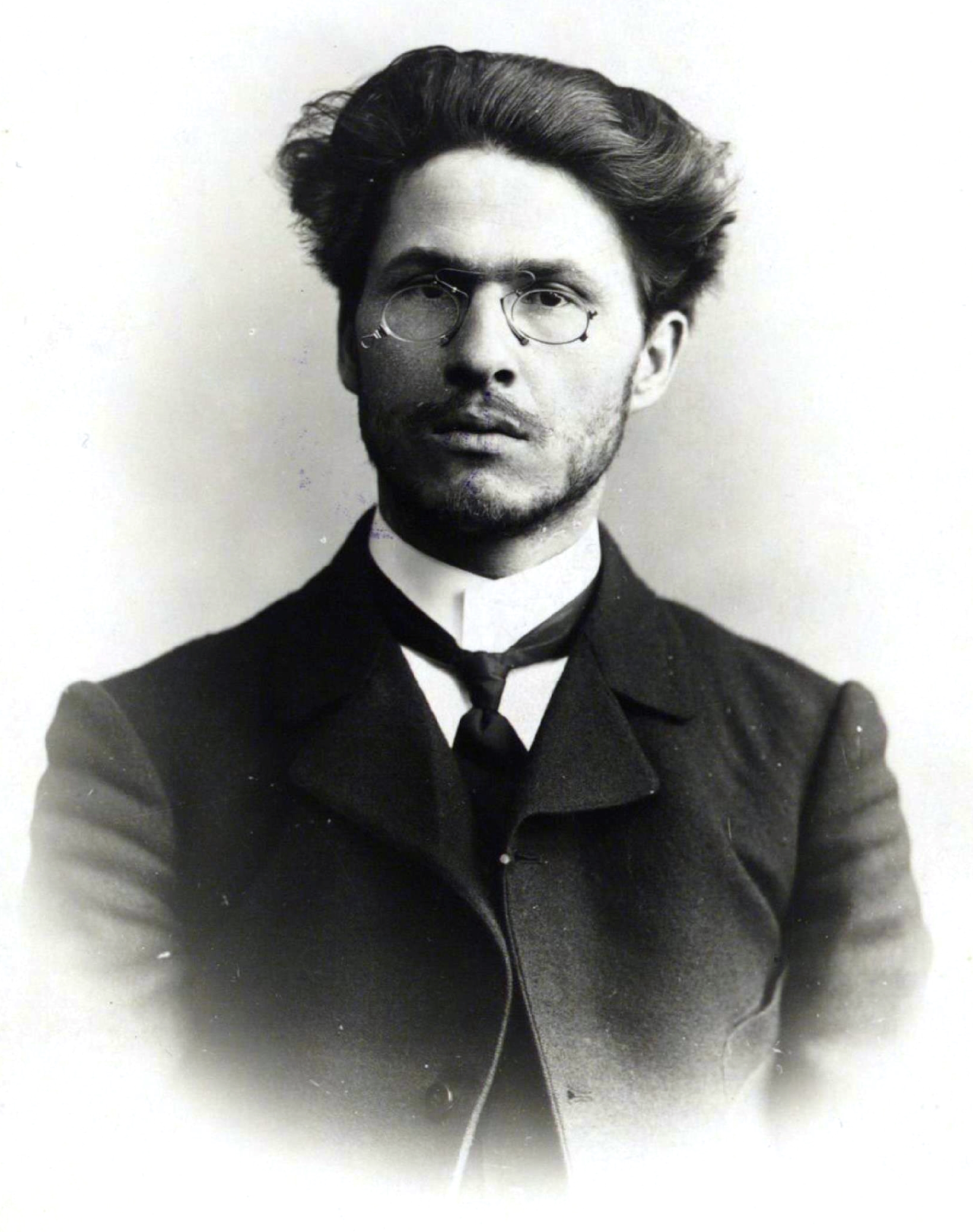
List No. 3 - Pskov Provincial Organization of the Socialist-Revolutionary Party and the Pskov Provincial Council of Peasant Deputies - List headed by G. K. Pokrovsky (pictured). The SR list was dominated by Left SR elements.

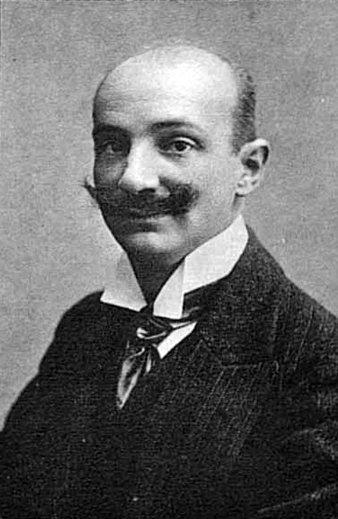
List No. 5 - Pskov Provincial Union of Landowners - List headed by Vasily Shulgin (pictured).
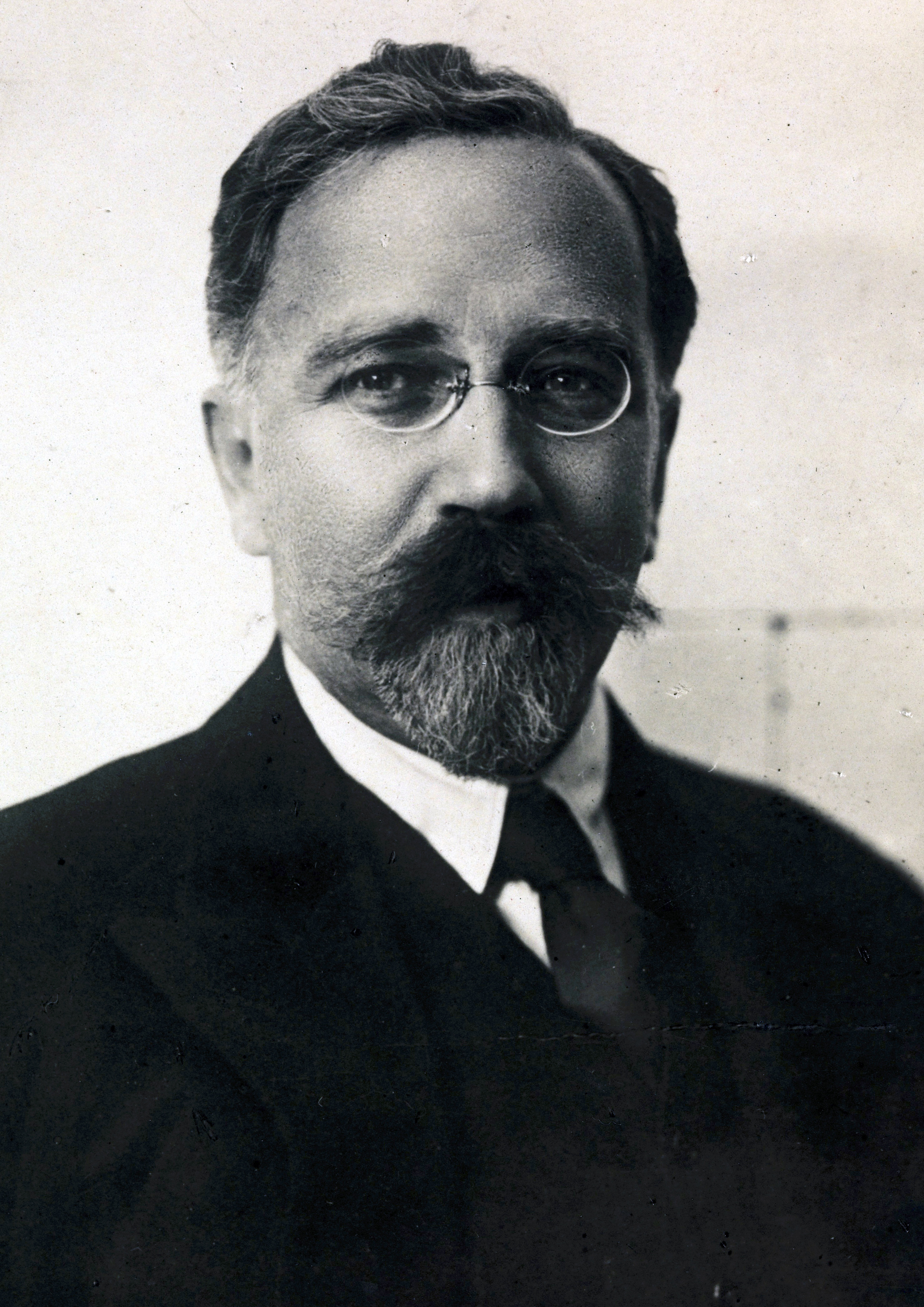
List No. 6 - Russian Social Democratic Labour Party (Bolsheviks) - List headed by Lev Kamenev (pictured).

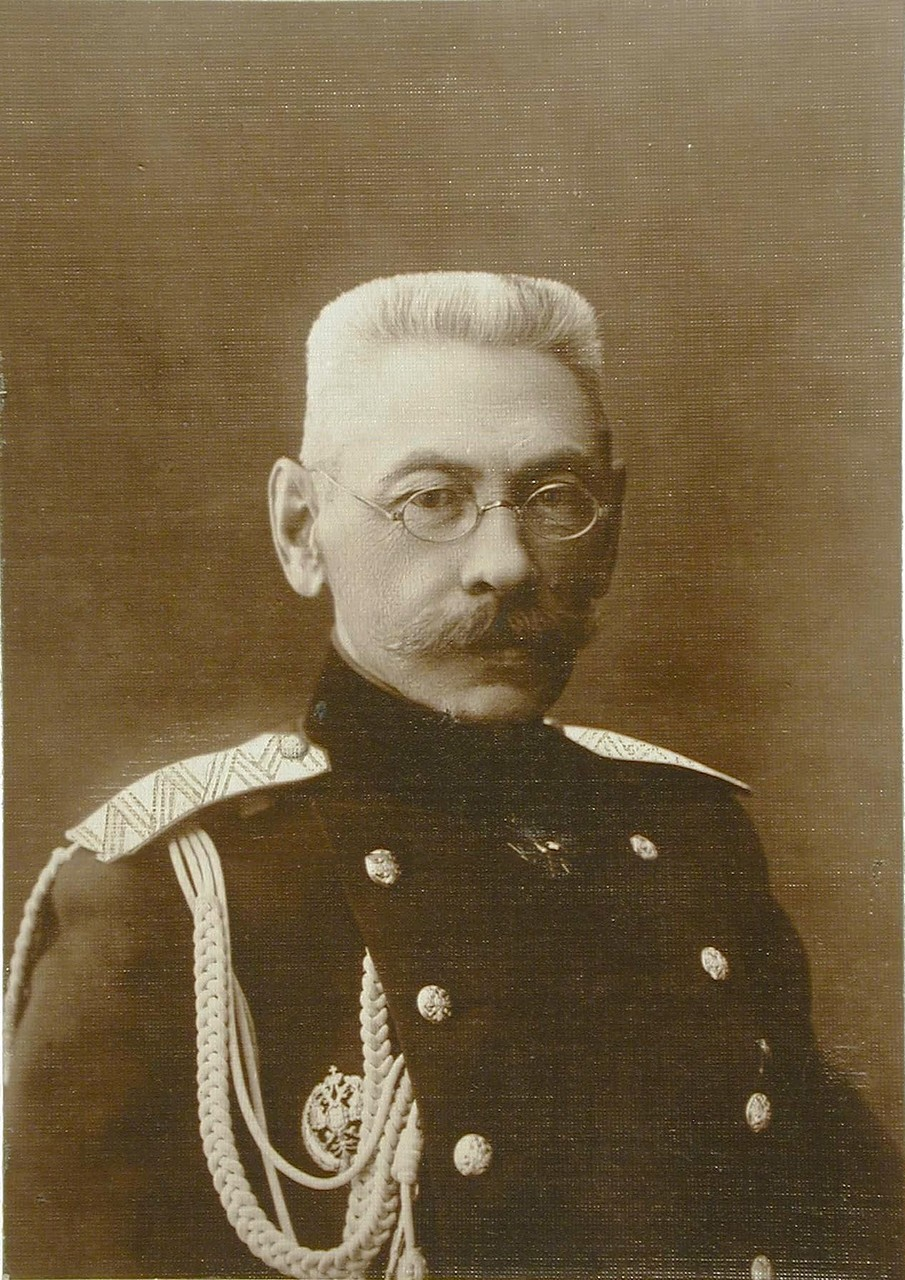
List No. 7 - Pskov United Democratic Groups of Townspeople, Peasants and Workers - List headed by General Nikolai Ruzsky (pictured). The third candidate on the list was S. M. Shilling, the chair of the Pskov District Election Commission.

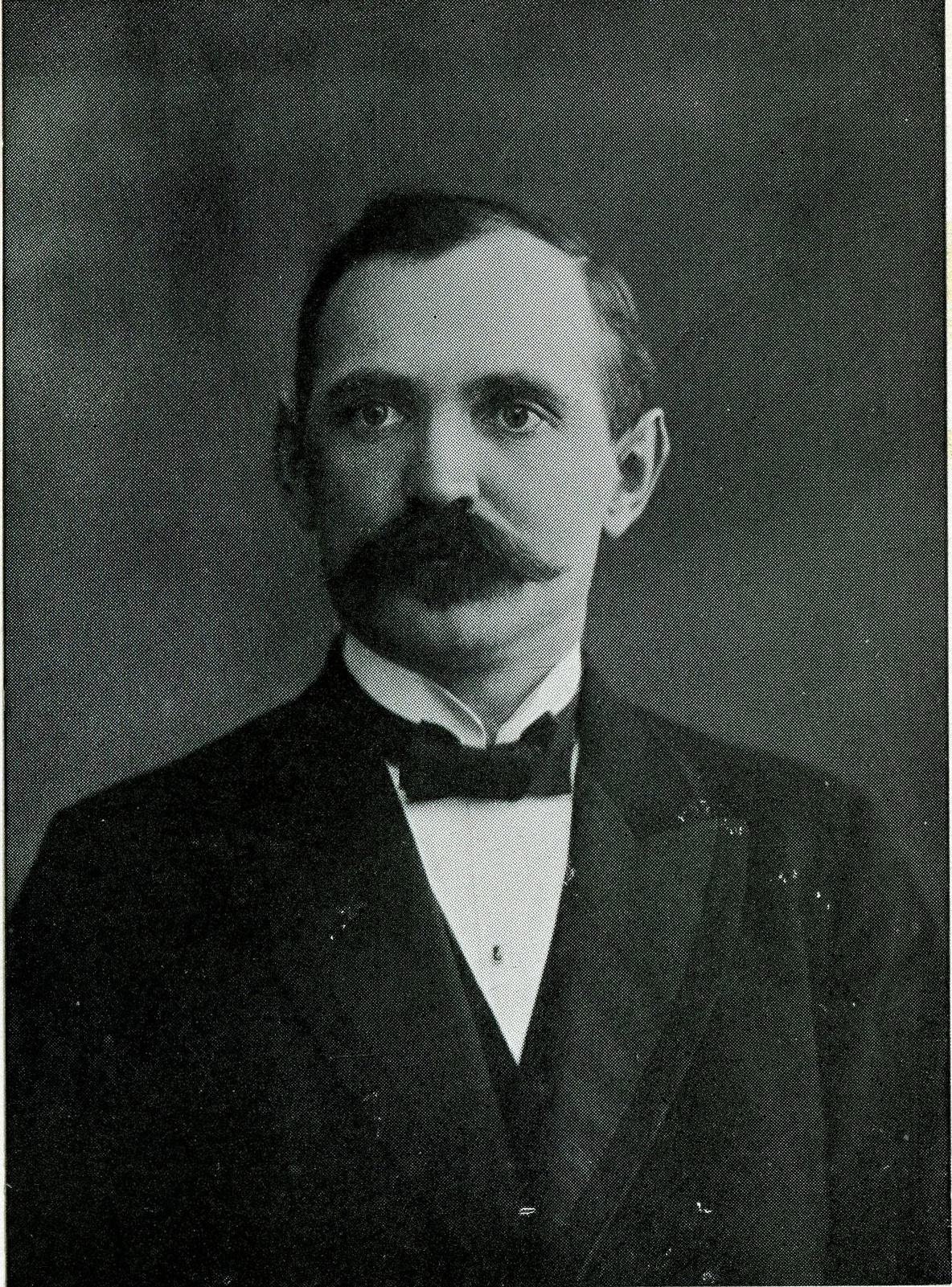
List No. 8 - Lettish Peasant Union and the Lettish Radical Democratic Party - List headed by Jānis Goldmanis (pictured). The two other candidates on the list were Jānis Zālītis and Zigfrīds Anna Meierovics.

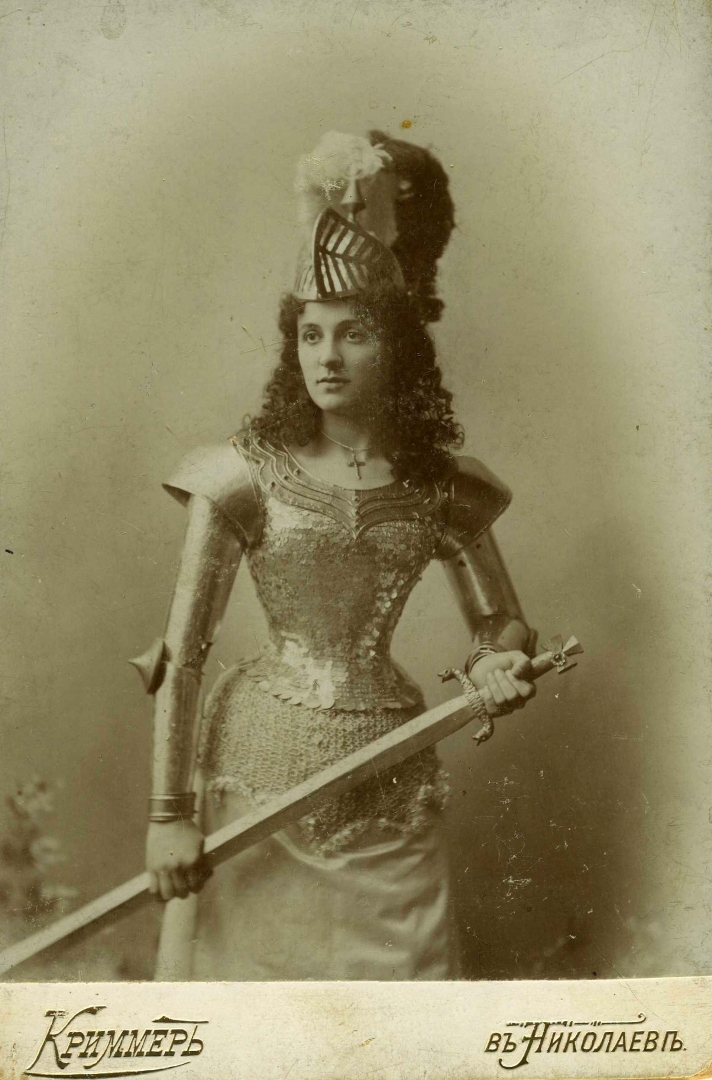
List No. 9 - Ostrov Branch of the All-Russian League for Women's Equality - List headed by Poliksena Shishkina-Iavein (pictured). Ekaterina Shchepkina was the fifth (and last) candidate on the list.

== Voting ==
The Socialist-Revolutionaries won the election in Pskov electoral district. Only in Toropetsky uezd did the Bolshevik list win, where it obtained 58.7% of the vote. There was a 60.3% voter turnout in the district.

Five SR deputies and three Bolshevik deputies were elected. Out of the SR deputies, all but Pokrovsky were Left Socialist-Revolutionaries. The head of the Bolshevik list, Kamenev, had been elected from four different electoral districts, and opted not to represent Pskov. Likewise, Mikhail Lashevich, the second candidate on the Bolshevik list was also elected from the Western Front electoral district, and opted to represent his military constituency. So the Pskov seats were given to candidates 3, 4 and 5 on the Bolshevik list.

Pskov
Party	Vote	%	Seats	%
List 3 - Socialist-Revolutionaries and Soviet of Peasants Deputies	295,012	57.25	5	62.50
List 6 - Bolsheviks	173,631	33.69	3	37.50
List 2 - Kadets	25,961	5.04		
List 4 - Mensheviks	4,870	0.95		
List 1 - Popular Socialists and Toiling Peasants	4,059	0.79		
List 8 - Lettish Peasant Union and Lettish Radical Democratic Party	3,859	0.75		
List 5 - Pskov Provincial Union of Landowners	3,209	0.62		
List 9 - All-Russian League for Women's Equality	2,366	0.46		
List 7 - Pskov United Democratic Groups of Townspeople, Peasants and Workers	2,337	0.45		
Total:	515,304		8	

Deputies Elected
Bekleshov	SR
Olkhin	SR
Pokrovsky	SR
Safonov	SR
Utkin	SR
Joffe	Bolshevik
Usharnov	Bolshevik
Yurov (Okhotin)	Bolshevik

A priest was killed in connection with the election day, one of few violent incidents across the country.
