= Olga Volkenstein =

Russian journalist and suffragist (1875–1942)

Olga Akimovna Volkenstein
- Ольга Акимовна Волькенштейн
- Born: 27 February 1875; Kishinev, Russian Empire
- Died: March 1942 (aged 67); Leningrad, Soviet Union
- Resting place: Piskarevsky Cemetery
- Occupations: journalist, suffragist and a leader of the women's rights movement
- Employer: Russian Thought
- Organization: Union for Women's Equality
- Political party: Social Revolutionary Party

Olga Akimovna Volkenstein (also spelled Volkenshteyn; Russian: Ольга Акимовна Волькенштейн; 27 February 1875 – March 1942) was a Russian journalist, suffragist and a leader of the women's rights movement in pre-revolutionary Russia.

== Early life ==
Volkenstein was born in Kishinev on 27 February 1875. Her father was military doctor Akim Filippovich Volkenstein, who was granted hereditary nobility in 1897, and her mother was Augusta Aronovna Volkestein (née Rabinovich). Her younger brother Fyodor, born in 1876, became a prominent lawyer.

== Career ==
Volkenstein worked as a journalist for the newspaper Russian Thought. She was a member of the Saint Petersburg Literary Society. She published under both her own name and various pseudonyms including: V.; V—n, O.; V—ъ, O.; Viktorova, O. I.; O. V.; Olgovich and W—n, O.

== Activism ==
Volkenstein was a left wing committee member of the Union for Women's Equality, which demanded equal political and voting rights for women. She hoped to mobilize female factory workers to the cause, was critical of the "well-to-do ladies" of the Union, and organised lecture tours to give talks on the early history of the women's movement.

She served as a delegate to the International Woman Suffrage Alliance (IWSA) Congress in Copenhagen in 1906, and organised the first All-Russian Women's Congress. The Union was succeeded by the League for Women's Equality. Volkenstein also became a member of the Social Revolutionary Party.

== Death ==
Volkenstein died in Leningrad, Soviet Union (USSR) in March 1942 and was buried at Piskarevsky Memorial Cemetery.
