= Zhenskii vestnik =

Zhenskii vestnik (Russian: Женский вестник, lit. 'Women's herald') may refer to:

- Zhenskii vestnik magazine, 1866–1867
- Zhenskii vestnik magazine, 1904–1917
