= Harold Williams (linguist) =

New Zealand journalist, editor and polyglot (1876–1928)

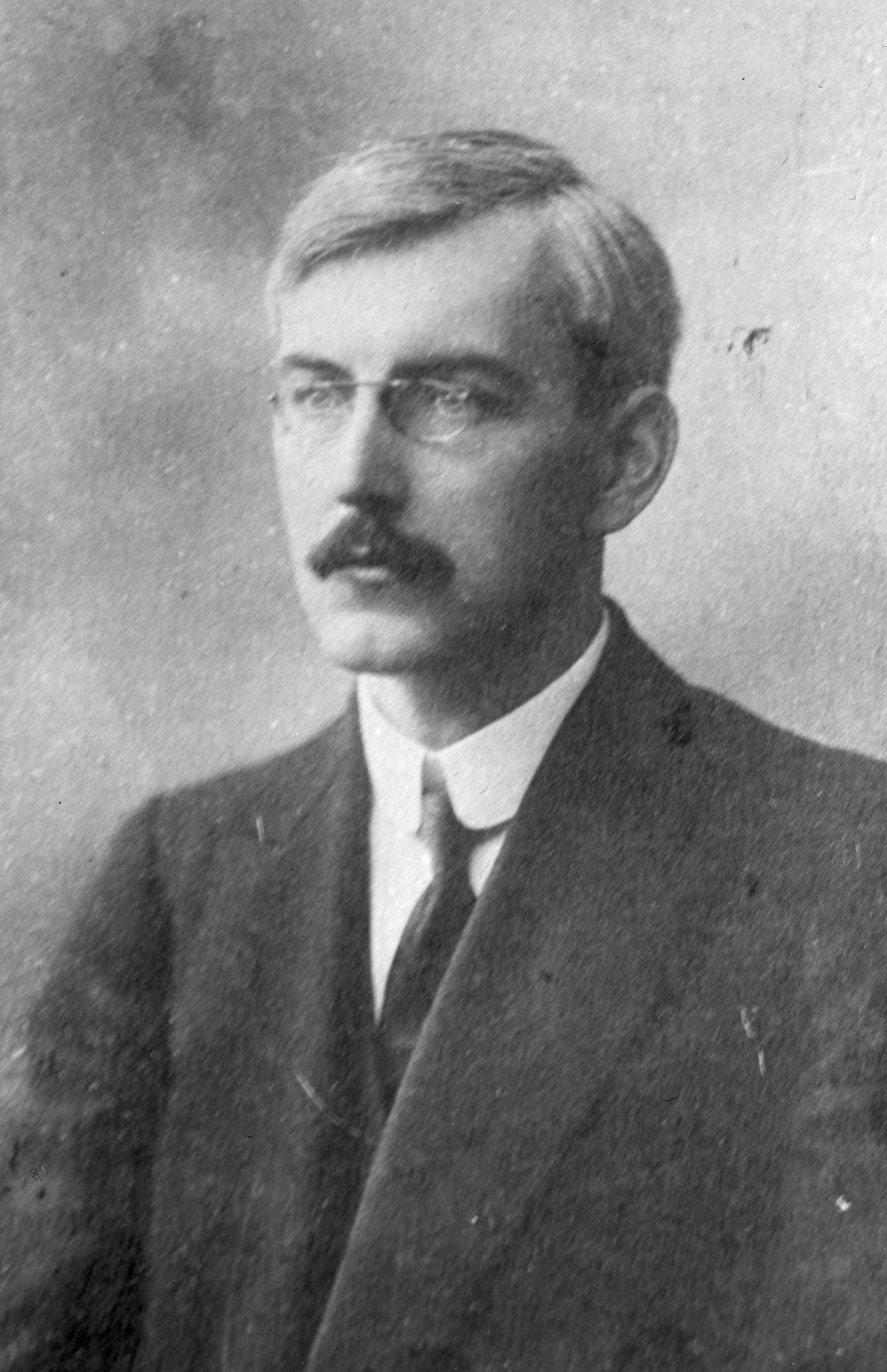
- Williams in c. 1920
- Born: 6 April 1876; Auckland, New Zealand
- Died: 18 November 1928 (aged 52); London, England
- Occupations: Linguist; Journalist
- Spouse: Ariadna Tyrkova-Williams

Harold Whitmore Williams (6 April 1876 – 18 November 1928) was a New Zealand journalist, foreign editor of The Times and polyglot who is considered to have been one of the most accomplished polyglots in history. He is said to have known over 58 languages, naturally including his native English. He "proved to know every language of the Austrian Empire", Hungarian, Czech, Albanian, Serbian, Romanian, Swedish, Basque, Turkish, Mandarin Chinese, Japanese, Tagalog, Coptic, Egyptian, Hittite, Old Irish, and other dialects.

== Life ==
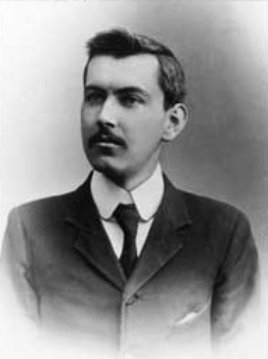
Williams as a young man

Williams was born in Auckland on 6 April 1876, the oldest of seven sons. His parents had emigrated from Cornwall, England, and his father, the Reverend W. J. Williams, was one of the early leaders of the Methodist church in New Zealand, for many years editing the Methodist Times. Williams senior was well-read and gave Harold early instruction in the classics. Like most youngsters his age, Williams was not possessed by a voracious appetite for learning, but he recalled that, when he was about seven, "an explosion in his brain" occurred and from that time his capacity to learn, in particular languages, grew to an extraordinary degree. He began with the study of Latin, one of the great root languages, and hungrily acquired others.

As a schoolboy he constructed a grammar and vocabulary of the New Guinea language Dobu from a copy of St Mark's Gospel written in that language. Next he compiled a vocabulary of the dialect of Niue Island, again from the Gospel written in that language, and was published in the Polynesian Journal. Williams spent his pocket money purchasing New Testaments from an obliging Christchurch bookseller in as many languages as he could. By the end of his life he had studied the Bible in twenty-six languages, including Zulu, Swahili and Hausa. Before attending Christchurch Boys' and Timaru Boys' High Schools he had managed to teach himself Latin, Ancient Greek, Hebrew, French, German, Spanish, Italian, Māori, Samoan, Tongan, Fijian and other Polynesian languages.

In 1893 the Williams family moved to Auckland, where the teenage Williams would visit ships at the Auckland wharves so that he could converse with Polynesian and Melanesian crewmen in their own tongues.

He sat for his BA at Auckland University, but was failed because of an inability to sufficiently master mathematics, and, on the instruction of his father, entered the Methodist Ministry at the age of 20. After appointments in St Albans, Christchurch, and Inglewood, Taranaki, he went to the Northern Wairoa district around Dargaville where there were crowds of gumdiggers of diverse nationalities. He quickly absorbed their languages and then began to study Russian and Polish, inspired in part by an interest in the Russian novelist Leo Tolstoy.

As Williams wrote to a Christchurch friend Macie Bevan Lovell-Smith, he was "struggling with reading Tolstoy in his native tongue". His admiration for Tolstoy was not only literary, but philosophical. He enjoyed preaching despite having a stammer. Some members of his congregation were suspicious of his socialist views and pacifism. Conservative members of the clergy also harboured suspicions, as Eugene Grayland writes in Famous New Zealanders, "His clerical superiors distrusted his views and disapproved of some of the heterodox books in his library, touching on evolution and such matters."

=== "Slavonic Crazes" ===
In June 1899 Williams wrote, "I have had rather slavonic crazes lately." One of these crazes would eventually be the compulsion for him to leave New Zealand. In 1900, aged 23, he decided to "embark on a pilgrimage" determined to visit the home of Tolstoy at Yasnaya Polyana. With a grant of £50 to cover the voyage (from a director of the New Zealand Herald who had been informed of his talents), and no scholarships or other assistance, he set off for Europe. He went first to Berlin and by the time he arrived at Berlin University he already knew twenty languages. There, and at the Ludwig-Maximilians-Universität München (LMU), he studied philology, ethnology, philosophy, history and literature. These years as a student were marked by poverty—his money from New Zealand had quickly run out—and he was forced to sell his books and the prizes he had won at school. He taught English part-time to make some money and he often had only a few hours each day to pursue his studies. There were days when he had nothing to eat, but he persevered and gained his PhD (on a grammar of the Ilocano language) from the Ludwig-Maximilians-Universität München in 1903.

Williams next undertook the study of Slavic languages and as a result became interested in Russian affairs and Tolstoy's Christian socialism. He toyed with becoming an academic, but instead entered journalism. The Times correspondent in Saint Petersburg, D. D. Braham, had been expelled and was organising a news service from adjacent countries. He appointed Williams as a special correspondent to work with Petr Struve an exiled Russian liberal in Stuttgart. The city had become the centre of organised political opposition by Russian political refugees working towards reform in their own country. Here Williams met Ariadna Tyrkova, the ‘Madame Roland’ of Russia. In October 1904 he had moved from Paris, in December to St Petersburg and Williams began to send by post dispatches to Reuters. Williams corresponded with the Dutch Frederik van Eeden about translations of his work.

In January 1905 Williams obtained positions with the Manchester Guardian in Russia, and worked towards Anglo-Russian rapprochement together with Bernard Pares. As a special correspondent for the Morning Post in 1908 and in the Ottoman Empire in 1911. Williams and his wife settled in Istanbul after their flat was searched by the Okhrana. In August 1914 he was writing for the Daily Chronicle dispatching telegrams and feature articles from all over the Russian Empire. He was in constant pursuit of his avowed quest "to serve the great cause of liberty".

His work in Russia enabled him, in 1905, to meet Leo Tolstoy, and they talked of politics, literature and morality. Reportedly Tolstoy asked him why he had learnt Russian and received the reply, "Because I wanted to read Anna Karenina in the original." Tolstoy insisted on the languages Williams spoke being enumerated. The interview was published in the Manchester Guardian on 9 February 1905, but for Williams the meeting was not a success. He was disappointed with Tolstoy's withdrawal from the world of political reality and the consequences of contemporary events. Williams found himself sympathetic towards the left-wing reformers, the Cadets and Liberals.

His "wife" (it is not known they ever married, perhaps in February 1918) was elected to the Russian Duma and was a misandrist. At this time, events and conditions that he encountered tested some of Williams' early views. He gave up being a vegetarian, and soon afterwards his pacifist ideals, but remained throughout his life a practising Christian, though with a belief guided by a general sense of the spiritual rather than the dogmatic. As he declared in his final sermon in New Zealand: "Whatever ye do, do it heartily as to the Lord, and not unto men."

=== Authority on Russian affairs ===
His remarkable knowledge of Russia soon established him as an authority on Russian affairs. He had freely travelled into every part of the country accumulating an immense amount of knowledge about Russia—its people, history, art and politics—augmented no doubt by his acquisition of Finnish, Latvian, Estonian, Georgian and Tatar. He also acquired a grasp of Russian grammar that was better than that of most of his Russian friends. His dispatches were thus more than disinterested journalism—they were the personal accounts of an observer living intimately in a society. His book, Russia and the Russians, reflected not only Williams' knowledge, but his astute mind, as H. G. Wells appreciated in a glowing 1914 review for the New York Daily News:

"In a series of brilliant chapters, Doctor Williams has given as complete and balanced an account of present-day Russia as any one could desire ... I could go on, sitting over this book and writing about it for days ... it is the most stimulating book upon international relations and the physical and intellectual being of a state that has been put before the English reader for many years."

Williams was always liberal in sharing his knowledge (the title of Tyrkova's biography of him is Cheerful Giver), and it was his many interests, broad and esoteric, that initially led to associations with eminent writers of the time, his friend Wells, Frank Swinnerton, and Hugh Walpole, associations that would develop into enduring friendships. In September 1914 Walpole arrived in Russia, and he met Williams in Petrograd. After the outbreak of war, both accompanied the Russian Army into the Carpathians. Williams was the only foreign correspondent to take part in Cossack raids penetrating over the Hungarian frontier. From there he dispatched to the British public authoritative reports on military, political and social conditions. Williams had changed his view on war; no trace of Tolstoyan belief in non-resistance remained.

These reports enhanced Williams' reputation and revealed his prophetic vision, leading to him becoming the chief source of information for the British Embassy. He also became chief confidant to the British Ambassador Sir George Buchanan.

Williams and Ariadna assisted the young Arthur Ransome when he arrived in Russia, as Williams thought he had the making of a good journalist and became a father-figure to him (see Brogan). Williams got him a job as Daily News correspondent. But they fell out with Ransome in 1918 over Allied intervention in Russia, which Ransome opposed in despatches and three books.

=== Advisor to statesmen ===
In 1916, Walpole and Williams, on the instruction of the Foreign Office, set up a British Propaganda Office in Petrograd. In August 1916, he returned briefly to Britain to give a special lecture at Cambridge University, entitled, "Russian Nationalities".

As the war progressed, Williams foresaw the coming Russian Revolution of 1917, insistently reporting to British Ambassador Buchanan that discontent was growing. Williams often acknowledged the romantic quality of his yearning to see international peace realised, and began also to see that the war had obscured vast tears in the fabric of the Russian domestic environment.

Throughout 1917, as the events of the Bolshevik revolution unfolded, he sent regular dispatches to the Daily Chronicle, up until 18 March 1918, the date of the Brest-Litovsk Peace Treaty by the All-Russian Council of Soviets. The scholar Sir Bernard Pares noted in 1931, that Williams' accurate and vivid articles "are amongst the sources of Russian history".

In 1918, increasingly violent events forced Williams and his wife to flee their beloved Russia, and he was immediately recruited as part of the Committee on Russian Affairs, along with Buchanan, Walpole, Bernard Pares and others. An advocate of liberal reform, Williams advocated Allied intervention in the revolution, and he was sought after as one of the few people who knew the Soviet leaders intimately, recounting to the British Prime Minister Lloyd George that Trotsky's last words to him before he left Russia were, "It will be the happiest day of my life when I see a revolution in England." Lloyd George disregarded his advice of intervention in Russia, even as Williams' prophecies were being realised. Williams continued to write for the Daily Chronicle and addressed a more influential reading public with his contributions to New Europe. He met Frank Swinnerton at the Lyceum Club. Swinnerton like Walpole, reviewed for Rhythm and The Blue Review – two avant-garde journals run by Katherine Mansfield and John Middleton Murry. Later in his autobiography Swinnerton would affectionately regard Williams as "the sort of friend who told me his affairs without disguise and received my domestic news as if they had affected himself." And wrote of his qualities as a journalist:

"...one who seemed by instinct to go where the raw material of the news was occurring, who if one walked with him in any street or town, would often dart across the road to buy another newspaper; but he found time to hear of and read all sorts of unlikely books in multitudinous languages, and would often give one unexpectedly humorous summaries of what he had been reading which threw glancing lights upon the irony underlying his simple faith ... one thought of him as a scholar and a visionary as well as a journalist. He combined a serenely happy-go-lucky air with an unembittered sadness at the fate of Russia."

When Germany surrendered in 1918, Williams was sent by the Daily Chronicle to Switzerland, and the following year was back in Russia, at the request of the British Military Mission, reporting for The Times from the headquarters of the White Russians. When opposition to the Bolsheviks crumbled, he and Ariadna escaped in a refugee ship, first to Turkey, then to Serbia, where he astounded the local Serbs by speaking their language fluently in just two days.

=== Down and out in Fleet Street ===
On his return from Russia he taught himself Japanese, Old Irish, Tagalog, Hungarian, Czech, Coptic, Egyptian, Hittite, Albanian, Basque and Chinese. He mastered the Cuneiform inscriptions and a book of 12,000 Chinese Mandarin characters.

Back in London, Williams felt underemployed and despondent. Despite the fact that he had witnessed several wars and revolutions first-hand, and was applauded as one of the great journalists of his age, he now found himself jobless.

=== Foreign editor for The Times ===
In 1921, his luck changed. The editor of The Times, Wickham Steed (who himself spoke several languages), offered Williams a position as a lead writer. In May 1922, he was appointed foreign editor (or as The Times would phrase it, 'Director of the Foreign Department'). Although his interest in Russia never waned, in this influential position he was now responsible for interpreting and passing judgement on political events all over the world for the pre-eminent newspaper of the time. As always, he was outspoken on issues that he believed were morally right, commenting on European affairs, but also those in Asia, China, the United States, Japan, India and the Commonwealth. The impetus of his leader articles always gestured towards a desire to preserve peace through the creation of European security. Aspiring towards "moral disarmament", he did much to promote the Treaty of Locarno of December 1925.

Typically, he used his knowledge as a tool of diplomacy and was able to talk to every delegate of the League of Nations in their own language. Williams held the position of foreign editor for six years before his untimely death in 1928. He had been unwell, but was about to go to Egypt on an assignment for The Times, when he collapsed. He had blood transfusions and seemed to rally, but died on 18 November 1928, after taking the sacraments of the Russian Orthodox Church the night before.

=== A cheerful giver mourned ===
The Times, a newspaper normally careful to project an aura of objectivity through its policy of maintaining staff anonymity, devoted an entire column to Williams' obituary.

"His literary ability and political judgement were abundantly manifested in the numerous leading articles which he contributed to the Times until within the last fortnight of his life ... to the Times indeed, his loss is irreparable. Not only was his knowledge of international affairs most extensive and accurate, but he had a remarkable gift of sympathy which enabled him to write of them both definitely and without offence, while his origin as a New Zealander always preserved him from too narrow a regard for the politics of Europe. He had many friends in the diplomatic world, where he was as much respected for his kindness as he was for his experience and his grasp of the essential factors of the most complicated situations."

Williams' pacific openness was exemplified in his relationship with H. G. Wells. Despite marked differences of opinion and philosophy over the direction events in Russia had taken, they had an understanding based on mutual respect. As Tyrkova-Williams writes in Cheerful Giver, "they understood each other at half a word, at a glance even." In a letter before Williams died, Wells refers to his "old friend", and after Williams' death he wrote that his admiration for him remained "very great indeed."

Williams traversed the edges of the globe, literally and linguistically. His parents came from Cornwall to New Zealand and as Eugene Grayland writes, "their boys inherited their love of the sea. Harold Williams' wife has said that whenever Harold looked at the sea his light blue eyes would grow more tender and darker." Williams went from New Zealand to devour the world. He stood, absorbing, on the edge of countries, civilisations and cultures, offering a life to match the expanse of his experience. The poet Maurice Baring wrote these lines as a tribute to Harold Williams:

Upon the bread and salt of Russia fed,
His heart her high sorrow seared and bled;
He kept the bitter bread and gave away
The shining salt, to all who came his way.

Sir Austen Chamberlain, the Secretary of State for Foreign Affairs, described Williams' death as "in a very real sense a national loss." He walked with the most prominent figures of his day, yet remained unassuming; The Times' obituary called him, "a very lovable man, modest to a fault."

== Vegetarianism ==
Williams became a vegetarian in 1891 after reading articles written by Leo Tolstoy and Lady Paget. He originally converted to vegetarianism over political and social ideals, but later became convinced of its ethics, considering it morally wrong to kill for food. He authored a four-page article describing his conversion to vegetarianism. Williams received criticism and social disapproval for his vegetarianism.

In 1896, he preached in Christchurch’s St Albans circuit where he met other vegetarians including Will and Jennie Lovell-Smith of Upper Riccarton. In 1900 after leaving New Zealand, Williams began eating meat again. He stated that he found it too difficult to maintain a vegetarian diet.

== Sources ==
- Harold Williams
- Charlotte Alston (2004) Russian Liberalism and British Journalism: the life and work of Harold Williams (1876–1928)
- Cheerful Giver: The Life of Harold Williams by Ariadna Tyrkova-Williams (Peter Davies, London, 1935) has a preface by Sir Samuel Hoare, who quotes about her that 'the Cadet party had one good man, and he was a woman'. She acknowledges advice on the book from Philip Graves and Sir Bernard Pares.
- Grayland, Eugene. (1967) Famous New Zealanders, 'Dr Harold Williams: Linguist With Amazing Powers' Whitcombe and Tombs Ltd, New Zealand.
- The Guinness Book of World Records . Note: Williams' listing as the greatest polyglot ever to have lived is probably incorrect—he is likely to have been surpassed by others including Giuseppe Mezzofanti, Hans Conon von der Gabelentz and István Dabi; and equalled by Ziad Fazah, Kenneth Hale, Georg Sauerwein, Robert Stiller and Uku Masing. See List of polyglots
- Brogan, Hugh (1984) The Life of Arthur Ransome (Jonathan Cape, London)
