= Powell Janulus =

Canadian polyglot (born 1939)

- Born: Powell Alexander Janulus; 1939 (age 86–87); Vancouver, British Columbia, Canada
- Education: University of British Columbia
- Known for: Fluency in 42 languages

Powell Alexander Janulus (born 1939) is a Canadian polyglot who lives in White Rock, British Columbia, and entered the Guinness World Records in 1985 for fluency in 42 languages. To qualify, he had to pass a two-hour conversational fluency test with a native speaker of each of the 42 languages he spoke at that time.

== Early life ==
Powell Janulus was born in Vancouver, British Columbia, Canada. He was exposed to many Slavic languages as a child. His Polish mother spoke six languages while his Lithuanian father spoke at least four. He could speak 13 languages fluently at the age of 18. He attended Asian Studies at the University of British Columbia where he attempted to learn Mandarin. In an interview, he stated that he struggled with the academic teaching style. He became curious about the process of language learning and in the way that children learn languages so easily. He attempted to learn Chinese by having conversations and talking with as many Mandarin speakers as possible.

When Janulus was in his early 20s, he began to develop his methodology for fast language acquisition. In his 30s, he became a court translator and was paid for each language he could translate. He worked to learn two or three languages per year, as each language allowed him to earn more. He was authorized by the Provincial Court of British Columbia, as a court translator in 28 languages. He later became interested in language variations and could quickly learn related languages such as Spanish and Portuguese. In his 40s, he learned less common languages such as Tibetan, Romani, Inuit and Swahili. Later in life, he opened the Geneva Language Institute, a language school in Vancouver.

== World record holder for fluency ==
In 1985, Janulus entered into the Guinness World Records for spoken fluency in 42 languages. To qualify, he took a two-hour conversational fluency test with a native speaker of each language he spoke at that time. This testing took place over one month. Powell said that he considers himself skilled in 64 languages and that he had studied at least 80. He said that the Canadian actor John Candy hired him to help him speak Punjabi for the 1989 film Who's Harry Crumb?. He appeared on The Tonight Show where talk show host Johnny Carson invited speakers of 48 languages to test Janulus.

It was reported that Powell speaks the following 41 languages (excluding English, which is his native language), and the many other languages in which he has some proficiency:

1. Armenian
2. Belarusian
3. Bulgarian
4. Cantonese
5. Croatian
6. Czech
7. Danish
8. Dutch
9. Finnish
10. French
11. Frisian
12. German
13. Greek
14. Hindi
15. Icelandic
16. Italian
17. Japanese
18. Kashubian
19. Korean
20. Kurdish
21. Lusatian
22. Macedonian
23. Mandarin
24. Norwegian
25. Persian
26. Polish
27. Portuguese
28. Punjabi
29. Romanian
30. Russian
31. Serbian
32. Sinhala
33. Slovak
34. Slovenian
35. Spanish
36. Swedish
37. Tibetan
38. Turkish
39. Ukrainian
40. Urdu
41. Wendish

== Recent years ==
Powell was reported to have died in 2006, however he later explained in an interview that his disappearance was due to a stroke he suffered at that time. He reported that he lost his ability to speak English, due to brain damage. He claimed to have regained his English spoken ability by speaking Dutch with a nurse. As of 2015, Powell is retired and living in White Rock, British Columbia. In August 2013, he was again the subject of a language testing event during which he spoke at least 20 languages and modeled the learning process with Korean and Tagalog.

== See also ==
- List of polyglots
