= Olga Shapir =

Russian writer and feminist (1850–1916)

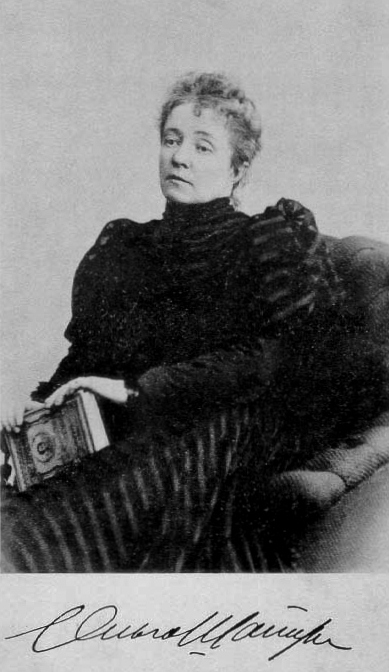
- Born: September 10, 1850; Oranienbaum, Russia
- Died: July 13, 1916 (aged 65); Saratov Governorate, Russia

Olga Andreyevna Shapir (Russian: Ольга Андреевна Шапир; born Kisliakova; September 10, 1850 – July 13, 1916) was a Russian writer, activist, and outspoken feminist.

== Early life and family ==
Olga Shapir was born on September 10, 1850, in Oranienbaum, Russia (now Lomonosov), a town on the Gulf of Finland. She was one of nine children born to a peasant family. Her father, Andrei Petrovich Kisliakov, was a former serf and employed as a military official in the commandant's headquarters in Oranienbaum under the Decembrist leader Pavel Pestel. Her mother, Lizaveta (Abramovich) Kisliakova, had aristocratic roots and was of German and Swedish descent.

Shapir notably attended Alexandrovskaia gymnasium from 1863 to 1865, one of the first public secondary schools for Russian girls, founded by Emperor Alexander I, where she earned a gold metal as a top student in the class. Shapir's intellectual curiosity led her to attend public lectures in 1870, including the “Vladminirskie Courses” which were created as a limited opportunity for Russian women to continue their education and participate in academic circles. Fluent in German and French, she translated articles from these languages into Russian to earn an income.

At the age of twenty-one in 1871, Shapir declared independence from her family. One year later in 1872, Shapir married Lazar Shapir, who was expelled from the Medical-Surgical Academy in St. Petersburg for his active membership in the Nardonaia rasprava ("Popular Punishment") led by Sergei Nechaev. She was able to get her husband reinstated, and he graduated in 1874. The couple moved to the Tsaritsynsky District of the Saratov Governorate where he practiced medicine as a zemstvo doctor. They lived for a time communally in St. Petersburg and established connections with the Kornilova sisters' circle, which plotted against Tsar Alexander II. The couple had two children together, Liudmila and Nikolai. Lazar granted Shapir permission to complete a formal education, which was atypical for women of the time. Shapir went on to challenge gender norms through her writing and by financially supporting her family.

== Career and writing genre ==
As a young adult, Shapir aspired to earn her own income and wrote short articles and translations for Russian newspapers Bizhevye vedomosti ("Stock Exchange News") and Novoe vremia ("New Times"). Once she separated from her family, she also managed Aleksandr Cheresov's Vasileostrovsky Library.

While living in the Saratov Governorate with Lazar, Shapir began writing her first unpublished story Sgoriacha(In the Heart of Passion). The work was denied by publishers due to its subject matter and Shapir burned the draft in frustration. Shapir's writing can be thematically evaluated through distinct periods of time. Her first novel, entitled Na poroge zhizne (On the Threshold of Life) was published in 1879. Between 1879 and 1887, her novels, including A High Price to Pay: A Family Story (Dorogoi tsenoi: iz semeinoi prozy, 1882) and Funeral Feast (Pominki, 1886) critiqued female oppression depicting protagonists who sacrificed personal or professional ambitions for family obligation. The protagonists abandon their own personal or professional ambitions to take care of her family. Then between 1879 and 1904, Shapir featured "the new woman" in her books, a concept developed by Aleksandra Kollontai, giving female heroines autonomy and control over the story's plot. Integral novels displaying this character include Mirages (Mirazhi, 1889), She Returned (Vernulas’, 1892), The Settlement, Avdot’ia’s Daughters, the story ‘Dunechka’ (‘Dunechka’, 1904) and In the Stormy Years, which is perhaps her best-known work. In the Stormy Years pulls on Shapir's own experiences as a member of Nechaev's radical group and spoke out to protect Dostoevsky and his novel, The Devils.

Her writing focused on the working and struggling class as well as women's rights. Despite her social and political activism, she was primarily regarded as a pulp romantic fiction writer, and her political and theoretical writings did not receive the same recognition. Many works were published in popular journals of the time, including Otechestvennye Zapiski, Severny Vestnik, and Vestnik Evropy.

Shapir also published an autobiography in 1907 that is available in Russian. In addition to speaking about the development of her prose and the influence of her upbringing, she documents how feminism shaped her focus as a writer. She says, "I recognized that the only way in which I could make a contribution of any value was to write from a woman's perspective and to reveal what only women can see in the eternal problem of love, in family relations, and in women's lack of rights in society" (p. 54).

== Politics ==
A member of Komitet po organizatsii zhenskoi manifestatsii mira ("Committee for the Organization of Women's Peace Manifest"). Shapir was politically aligned with the left like many other women prose writers known as a liberal feminist. Shapir referred to her feminist ideology as "Ravenstvo pri razlichii"(feminist of distinction). As a respected public speaker and writer to equal rights feminists (ravnopravki) in Russia. She argued that while men and women deserved equal rights, their core differences should be acknowledged in social change. She believed that maternal instincts and motherhood gave women unique perspectives and values essential to society. Although she did not identify as a socialist, Shapir sympathized with many socialist ideologies and often found common ground with their broader calls for social reform. Believing many larger social conflicts stemmed from gender inequality and that addressing these differences was key to broader societal reform. Advocating that women should not aspire to the same set of standards as men. Shapir believed many larger conflicts could be traced back to inequity between sexes.

== Activism and philanthropy ==
In 1895, Shapir joined the Russian Women's Mutual Philanthropic Society and held a number of leadership positions including manager of the Commission on Fundraising, manager of the Society's Department of Abstracts and member of the governing Council that decided on the organization's policies. Shapir considered the Society to be a place for females to convene and discuss their shared experiences and hardships. They focused on ways to empower the ongoing Russian women's movement. Members largely consisted of educated, upper-class individuals who sought to improve their own status while providing aid to those who were less fortunate. Shapir's disagreement with the Society's administrative leader, Anna N. Shabanova, on charitable projects led her to resign from the Council but continue working in the Suffrage Department to plan the First All-Russian Women's Congress in 1908.

Shapir also joined the Women's Equal Rights Union in 1905, born out of the first Russian Revolution, which focused on securing women's suffrage. The group aligned with left-wing Russian political organizations and parties and played an active role in civil disobedience.

Shapir played a monumental role in the First All-Russian Women's Congress held in 1908. The congress was a significant moment in Russian history, as it gathered thousands of female delegates of varying backgrounds to chart a path forward toward a more equitable future. It was composed of majority middle-class citizens with many well-established organizers. The congress drew inspiration from both the International Women's Movement conference in Chicago in 1903 and the Russian liberation movement. While it was originally planned for 1905, it was postponed three years because governor-general, Trepov, required the speeches be censored amidst ongoing tension between Russian society and the government. By 1908, the congress was granted permission to widen the conversation to include the economic and social position of women and their involvement in civil rights movements.

Shapir compiled a report entitled "Ideals of the Future," where she argued to the cohort that women's worldviews are of equal importance to men's. Other topics discussed during the congress included the woman's role in the family, access to education, and employment. With so many opinions present, the congress was unable to reach unanimity about an intervention and so no direct action resulted at a grand scale. Still, Shapir's large involvement in its production spurred provocative discourse and encouraged women to come together and share their experiences during the old régime. She continued to advocate for women's rights until resigning from the Congress in 1912 due to illness.

== Legacy ==
Together with Ekaterina Letkova, Valentina Dmitryeva, and Anastasiya Vervitskaya, Shapir was at the forefront of feminist thought. Shapir's literary and theoretical works reached a diverse audience of citizens and Russian feminists alike. During her long career, she was published in renowned journals and magazines, and used her platform to speak about the female experience. She differentiated herself from other Russian writers by challenging stereotypes and displaying high-achieving women in her work. Shapir's contribution to the Suffrage Department of the Russian Women's Philanthropic Society played an essential role in crafting legislature adopted by the State Duma that directly awarded females their inheritance separate from their husband.

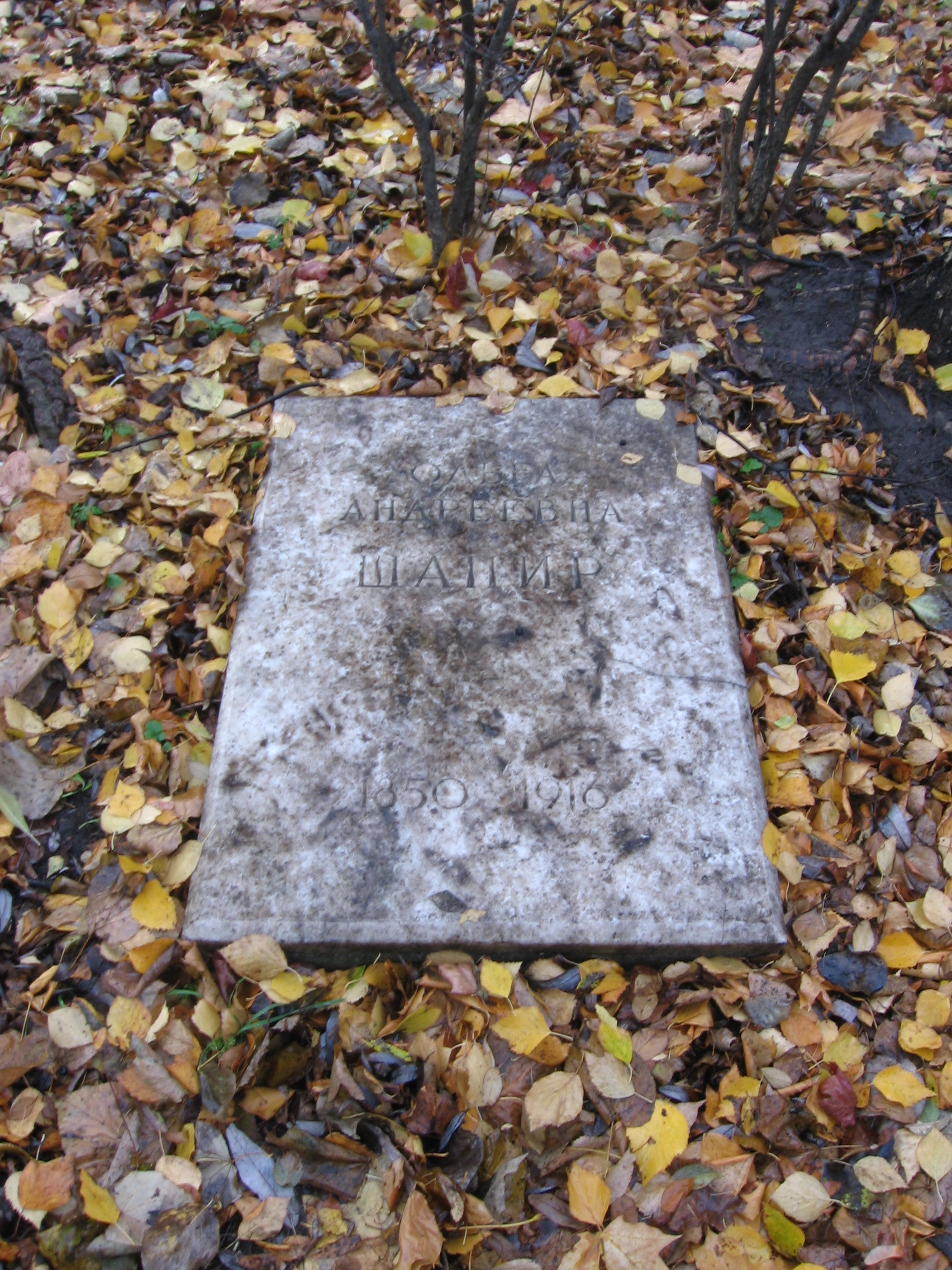
Shapir's Gravestone

Shapir died on July 13, 1916, of illness in Saint Petersburg and is buried in the Literatorskie Mostki of Volkovskiy Orthodox Cemetery.

Her work remains relevant today. In 2020, artist Pipilotti Rist dedicated an installation, Peeping Freedom, to Shapir, showcasing red window shutters behind which a video is projected.

== Published books ==
- Antipody, 1882
- Na raznykha iazykakh, 1884
- Povesti i rasskazy, 1889
- Bez livbui, 1890
- Ee siatel'stuvo, 1891
- Mirazhi, 1892
- Vernulas'!, V slobodke. Deti otkazali, 1894
- Liubou', 1896
- Starye pesni, 1990
- Avdot'iny dochki, 1901
- Zakonnye zheny, 1902
- Drug destuvo, 1903
- Invalidy i novobrantsy, 1905
- Ne proverili, 1905
- V burnye gody, 1907
- Sonina khatva, 1908
- Chuzhoi, 1908
- Roza Sarona, 1910
- V temnote, 1910
- Sobranie sochineniia, 1910-1912

=== English translations ===
- The Settlement, from An Anthology of Russian Women's Writing, 1777-1992, Oxford University Press, 1994.

== See also ==
- Anna Filosofova

== Sources ==
- "Шапир, Ольга Андреевна" . Brockhaus and Efron Encyclopedic Dictionary (in Russian). 1906.
