= Anna Kalmanovich =

Anna Andreevna Kalmanovich
- Occupations: Feminist, writer and suffragette
- Spouse: Samuil Kalmanovich

Anna Andreevna Kalmanovich (fl. 1893–1917) was a Russian feminist and suffragette. Her public activities began with philanthropy in the 1890s and moved to radical feminism over the next several decades. It is not known if she survived the Bolshevik-led October Revolution of 1917.

== Life and activities ==
Kalmanovich was married to Samuil Eremeevich Kalmanovich, "a prominent defense lawyer involved in many of the major political trials leading up to, and during the 1905 Revolution." They had children, but nothing is known about them. While living in Saratov, she founded the Saratov Hebrew Society for the Care of the Sick (Saratovskoe Evreiskoe Popechitel’stvo o Bol’nykh) in 1893 and served as its President until 1904. She made her first public speech in December of that year, a report on that year's congress of the International Council of Women in Berlin. Attacks by the anti-semitic and ultra-nationalist Black Hundreds forced them to flee Saratov into exile, where Kalmanovich was able to attend congresses of the International Woman Suffrage Alliance in 1906 and 1908 and was able to lecture on the women's movement to groups of Russian exiles in Switzerland.

Upon her return to Russia in 1908, Kalmanovich joined the All-Russian Union for Women's Equality (Russian: Всероссийский союз равноправия женщин) and began writing for the magazines Union of Women (Soiuz Zhenshchin) and Woman's Herald (Zhenskii vestnik). She addressed the 1908 All-Russian Women's Congress in a speech that she entitled, The Women's Movement and how the Parties Relate to It (Zhenskoe Dvizhenie i Otnosheniia Partii k Nemu). She then joined the All-Russian League for Women's Equality (Russian: Всероссийская лига равноправия женщин) later in 1908.
