= Zinaida Ivanova =

Russian feminist author and translator (1865–1913)

Zinaida Sergeevna Ivanova
- Born: 1865; Sychyovsky Uyezd, Smolensk Governorate, Russian Empire
- Died: 24 August 1913 (aged 48–49); Vladykino (near Moscow), Russian Empire
- Occupations: Author and translator
- Writing career
- Pen name: 'N. Mirovich', 'Zinaida Mirovich'
- Subjects: Women's rights and education

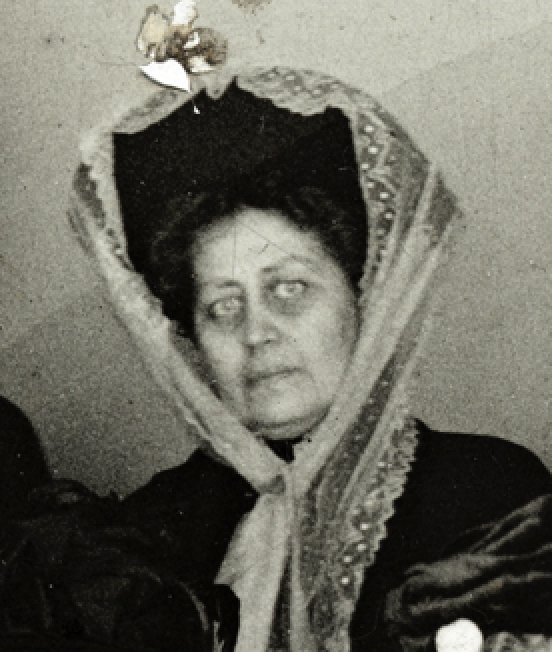
Zinaida Ivanova at the Suffrage Alliance Congress, London 1909. Taken from a group shot of attendees.

Zinaida Sergeevna Ivanova (1865 – 24 August 1913) was a Russian feminist author and translator, under the pen-names of N. Mirovich and Zinaida Mirovich.

== Life ==
Zinaida Ivanova was born 1865 in Sychyovsky Uyezd, in the Smolensk Governorate of the Russian Empire. She grew up in Moscow, graduating from the Courses Guerrier for Women in 1897. Shortly afterwards, she married and began to volunteer with the Moscow Commission on the Organization of Home Reading (Moskovskaia Kommissiia po Organizatsii Domashnego Chteniia). Fluent in English, French, German, Norwegian, Finnish and Russian, she began freelance writing and translating. As that dried up in the early years of the first decade of the 20th century, she turned to lecture tours to supplement her income. Ivanova died on 24 August 1913, at Vladykino, a suburb of Moscow.

== Activities ==
She began writing on women's issues, especially with reference to the French Revolution, shortly after her marriage, sometimes using the pseudonyms 'N. Mirovich' and 'Zinaida Mirovich', and translated several of the Norwegian playwright Henrik Ibsen's best-known plays into Russian. Ivanova attended the London congress of the International Council of Women in 1899 and twice addressed congresses of the International Woman Suffrage Alliance (1904 and 1906) on the status of the Russian women's movement. Her fluency in English and Anglophilia allowed her to spend a lot of time in Britain, speaking at women's suffrage rallies in Hyde Park, London, and translating the English philosopher John Stuart Mill's essay, The Subjection of Women, into Russian. Ivanova was one of the founders of the All-Russian Union for Women's Equality (Russian: Всероссийский союз равноправия женщин) during the Russian Revolution of 1905 and joined the All-Russian League for Women's Equality (Russian: Всероссийская лига равноправия женщин) after the Union disbanded in 1908.
