= Ioannis Ikonomou =

Greek translator

- Ιωάννης Οικονόμου
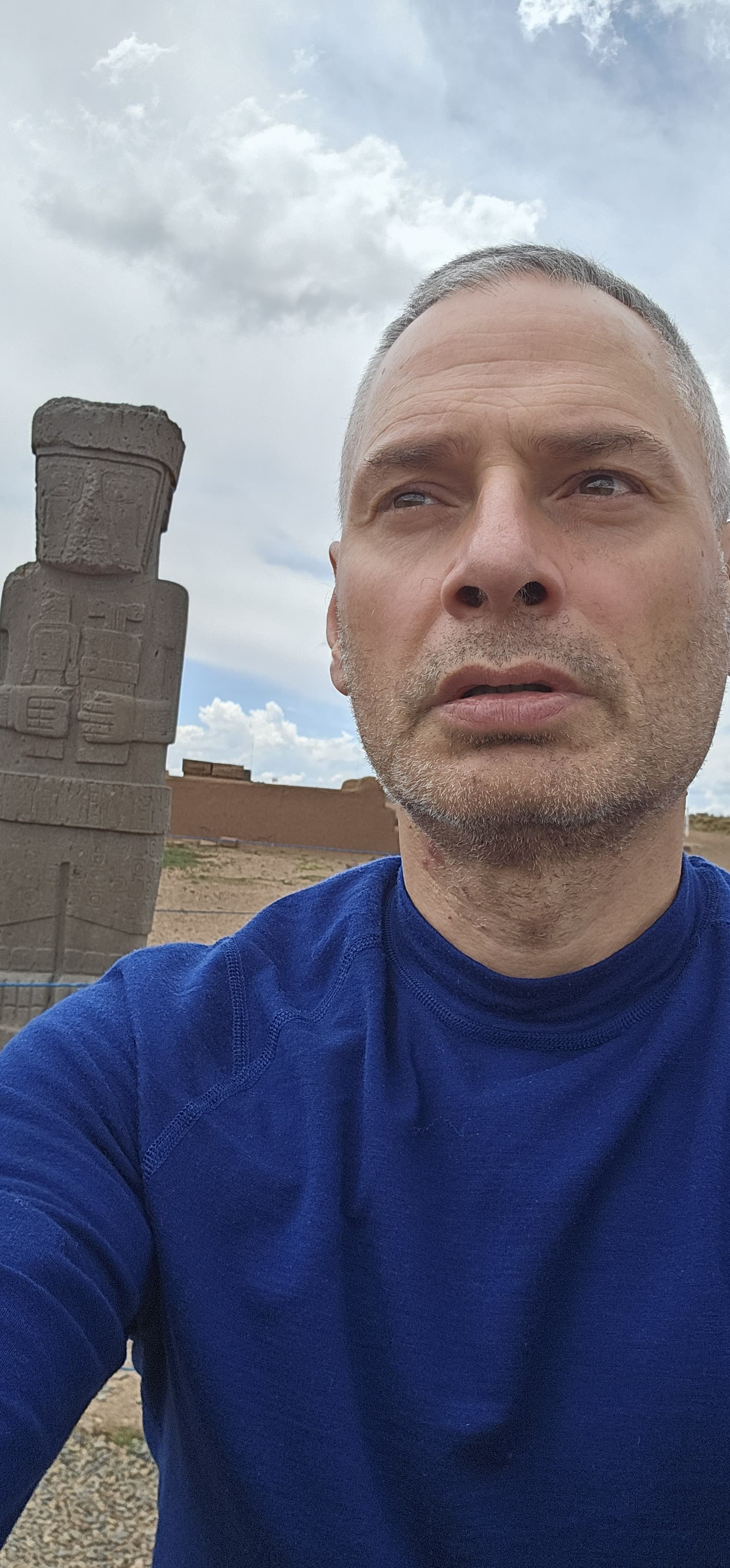
- Ioannis Ikonomou in 2024
- Born: 1964 (age 61–62); Heraklion, Crete, Greece
- Education: University of Thessaloniki (B.A.); Columbia University (M.A.); Harvard University (Ph.D.)
- Occupation: Translator
- Employer: European Commission (Belgium)
- Known for: Polyglottism

Ioannis Ikonomou (Greek: Ιωάννης Οικονόμου; born 1964) is a Greek translator who has been working for the European Commission in Brussels since 2002.

== Early life and education ==
Inspired by foreign tourists visiting Crete, he began to study foreign languages at a young age: English at age five, when he moved to Athens with his family, German at seven, Italian at ten, Russian at thirteen, Swahili at fourteen, and Turkish at sixteen. He had learned 15 languages by the age of twenty.

He studied linguistics at the University of Thessaloniki before pursuing an MA in Middle Eastern languages and cultures at Columbia University in the United States. He continued with a PhD in Indo-European linguistics at Harvard University. The subject of his doctoral dissertation at Harvard was a text by Zarathustra written in Avestan, a form of Old Iranian.

== Career ==
Considered a notable contemporary example of a polyglot, he knows 32 living languages, including Greek, English, German, Italian, Spanish, French, Finnish, Danish, Russian, Swahili, Hebrew, Arabic, Mandarin, and Bengali, and reportedly as many as 47 languages including dead languages like Old Church Slavonic. He speaks 21 out of 24 official EU languages. He considers the Mandarin language as the most complicated language to learn. Chinese is also his favourite language. He is the only in-house translator of the European Commission who is trusted to translate classified Chinese documents.

== Personal life ==
He is gay and is married to Tomek Malarski, who is Polish. To maintain his language skills, he chats online with native speakers from around the world.

== See also ==
- List of polyglots
