= Zhenskii vestnik (1904) =

Monthly feminist magazine in Russia (1904–1917)

- Categories: Feminist magazine
- Frequency: Monthly
- Founder: Mariia Ivanovna Pokrovskaia
- Founded: 1904
- First issue: September 1904
- Final issue: 1917
- Country: Russian Empire
- Based in: Saint Petersburg
- Language: Russian

Zhenskii vestnik (Russian: Women's Herald) was a Russian language monthly feminist magazine which was published in Saint Petersburg in the period 1904–1917. Its subtitle was Soiuz zhenshchin, Jus suffragii. The magazine billed itself as monthly social scientific and literary journal on equality and advancement of women.

== History and profile ==
Zhenskii vestnik was established by the Russian feminist Mariia Ivanovna Pokrovskaia in 1904. The first issue appeared in September that year. It was published on a monthly basis. Until 1907 the magazine of which both editor and publisher was Pokrovskaia acted as the official organ of the Union of Women. In each issue of the magazine the recurring topics included: women must have less expectations from men; in the struggle for their emancipation women should not rely on man and women pursue their interests independent of any political movement led by men. Pokrovskaia also express her belief in women’s natural superiority to men and her opposition to the views of Leo Tolstoy on the 1905 revolution in her articles.

Some of the major contributors were Ariadna Tyrkova, Liubov Gurevich, Mariia Chekhova, Anna Miliukova and Anna Kalmanovich. The magazine folded in 1917 shortly after the Bolshevik revolution.
