= Ekaterina Shchepkina =

Russian feminist, historian and journalist (1854–1938)

Ekaterina Nikolaevna Shchepkina
- Born: 1854
- Died: 1938 (aged 83–84)
- Education: Courses Guerrier; Bestuzhev Courses
- Occupations: Feminist, historian and journalist

Ekaterina Shchepkina (1854–1938) was a Russian and later Soviet feminist, historian and journalist.

== Life ==
Ekaterina Nikolaevna Shchepkina was born in 1854 and attended the Courses Guerrier in Moscow and the Bestuzhev Courses in St Petersburg as a protégé of the director, the historian Konstantin Bestuzhev-Ryumin. She taught history classes for workers at the Imperial Technical Society (Imperatorskoe Technicheskoe Obshchestvo) from 1890 and later taught history at the Bestuzhev Courses in the latter half of the 1890s. She also wrote a history of Russia, two historical monographs and articles on women's history and issues. Shchepkina was one of the founders of the All-Russian Union for Women's Equality in February 1905 and joined the All-Russian League for Women's Equality after the Union dissolved at the end of the Russian Revolution in 1906. Shchepkina gave a talk at the 1908 All-Russian Women's Congress (Pervyi Vserossiisskii Zhenskii S’ezd) and was one of the League's ten candidates for the Russian Constituent Assembly after the February Revolution of 1917. She published a history of the women's movement during the French Revolution in 1921 with an introduction by Alexandra Kollontai. Little is known about Shchepkina's activities after 1926. She died in 1938.
