= Lyuba Kutincheva =

Bulgarian traveler

- Люба Кутинчева
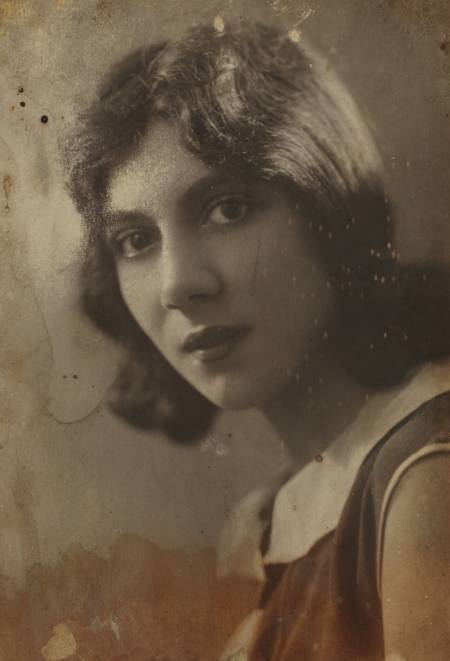
- Born: 15 May 1910; Tarnovo
- Died: 20 September 1998 (aged 88); Sofia, Bulgaria
- Occupations: Traveler, Esperantist
- Spouse: Alexander Konstantinov Dagorov

Lyuba Kutincheva (Bulgarian: Люба Кутинчева; 15 May 1910 – 20 September 1998) was a Bulgarian traveller and polyglot who was known to speak at least seven languages. She travelled for almost a decade (1929–1938) in the Middle East, Far East, northern Africa and Europe.

== Biography ==
=== Earliest years ===
Kutincheva was born in Tarnovo in the Kingdom of Bulgaria on 15 May 1910 into a family of intellectuals. After 1913, the family lived in Southern Dobruja, which was historically part of Bulgaria but was held at that time by Romania. While she was still a student, she participated in the Internal Dobrujan Revolutionary Organisation with her father, which was a communist organization of Bulgarians dedicated to freeing their territory from Romania.

Lyuba graduated from a French high school in Bucharest, Romania. By that time, she had become an engaging speaker who enjoyed telling stories of her home region and pleading for its separation from Romania. In the company of someone from her family (father or uncle) she went to Turkey, where she toured big cities to entertain audiences with tales of Bulgarian history, literature, poetry, manners and customs, and about the situation in Dobruja under Romanian rule. Her talks were "aimed at the Romanian authorities' attempts to assimilate the population of Dobruja." She was able to speak Bulgarian, French, Romanian and Turkish. Her talks were very well attended and, using the money she earned from them, she began her travels in 1929 when she was only 19 years old.

=== Travels ===
According to a 2016 Bulgarian state exhibit that presented artefacts from her trips between 1929 and 1939, Kutincheva (accompanied by her father or uncle) travelled to: Syria, Palestine, Transjordan (now Jordan), Egypt, Abyssinia (Ethiopia and Eritrea), Sudan, Saudi Arabia, Iraq, Persia (Iran), Afghanistan, Oman, India, Burma (Myanmar), Ceylon (Sri Lanka), Borneo, Sumatra, Philippines, Formosa (Taiwan), Siam (Thailand), China, Japan, Southern Sakhalin, Algeria, Spanish Morocco, Tunisia and Libya. Throughout her travels, she told stories of Bulgarian life and "wore a Bulgarian tricolor on her hat."

Archives from her trips include detailed notes and numerous photographs, showing her with notable local figures. According to Tsankova, "It remains a mystery how she managed to get to such high-ranking persons, in the company with whom she is photographed." Her archives show her with kings, ministers, religious figures and even Mahatma Gandhi and Jawaharlal Nehru in India.

One source, Borisov, says that while travelling in Shanghai, China, Kutincheva was abducted with two British women. She was reportedly released after payment was made of $5,000. Researchers, noting the substantial ransom paid, have suggested that in addition to being a traveller, Kutincheva visited these wildly exotic places as a spy.

=== Education ===
After travelling for many years, Kutincheva went to Paris in 1935 to continue her education, studying journalism and French philology. She spent a one-year internship as a correspondent for the periodical Le matin and as a photojournalist for La femme, after which she began another journey through Spain and Morocco. In early 1939 she returned to France, where she completed her higher education. Finally, after a ten-year absence from home, she returned to Bulgaria in poor health.

In 1939, she married journalist Alexander Konstantinov Dagorov, and she is sometimes known as Lyuba Kutincheva Dagorova.

=== Mysteries remain ===
The exact circumstances of Kutincheva's financial backing for her trips have never been identified. Other aspects of her life and travels also remain unclear: What were the real purpose of her travels? Why did she collect such careful notes and photographs? According to Pavlovich,

Unfortunately, it is still unclear how Lyuba paid for her long stays abroad, although she reportedly sometimes lectured or worked in various places. It is equally unclear what the purpose of the trip was, as well as the notes she carefully collected from the authorities in each city she visited. One of the most curious hypotheses is that Lyuba was a spy funded by the Communist International.

Borisov also raises questions:

It has certainly been established that Lyuba was in close contact with Soviet diplomats, but the nature of her visits is not entirely clear. However, her profile makes the spy version very believable - in addition to traveling a lot, she speaks French, Romanian, Turkish and Russian, and later learns Arabic and Esperanto.

Even though she lived a long life, there is no record that she ever acknowledged a subversive purpose for her extensive travels. She donated her archives to the State Archives in Sofia where they are stored in section 1328K.

Kutincheva died on 20 September 1998 in Sofia, Bulgaria.

== Published work ==
- Kutincheva, L. "Japan - personal impressions, observations and research," Stara Zagora, Rodina Printing House, 1942
