= Hans Eberstark =

Austrian linguist

- Born: 27 January 1929; Vienna
- Died: 19 December 2001 (aged 72)

Hans Eberstark (27 January 1929, Vienna – 19 December 2001) was an Austrian linguist and translator, known as a mental calculator, multilinguist and interpreter.

== Life ==
Eberstark often lectured on language and translation in Europe and was known for asking someone whose first language was a small local dialect of German (particularly Swiss German, of which there are countless dialects) to speak with him (during the lecture); after a few minutes Eberstark would suddenly start speaking fluently in that dialect.

Eberstark was of Viennese Jewish origin. He spent eight years in Shanghai during World War II, with many other displaced people from all over Europe. It was there that he was exposed to many different languages. He once told science writer Jeremy Bernstein that to his "eternal disgrace" he had not learned to speak Chinese "properly" while there, but Bernstein noted that Eberstark's standards for speaking a language were "different from most people's."

Eberstark was living in Vienna, Austria, when he joined Mensa International. After he moved to Geneva, Switzerland, in 1965 to work as an interpreter with the International Labour Organization, he founded Mensa Switzerland. He took early retirement in 1967 and became a free-lance and also taught courses in translating and interpreting at the University of Geneva.

Eberstark was prepared to interpret into English and German and from French, Dutch, Italian, Spanish and Catalan. He also knew how to speak Surinamese Creole, Haitian Creole and Papiamento, from the Netherlands Antilles, as well as Yiddish, several varieties of Swiss German, Albanian and Hebrew.

In the late 1960s he was married with two children. He once told a group of friends that he "knew" the date he would die.

He also is known for having once recited 11,944 successive digits of the mathematical quantity of pi from memory. During an earlier attempt he had intended on reciting roughly half that many but had made a mistake. He was angry with himself for the mistake so he memorized even more.

Eberstark once wrote that the "external rewards" of excelling in mental arithmetic were "Making friends, making money, showing off, and giving pleasure."

== Bibliography ==
- "Verba Volant, Scripta Manent: Dolmetachen und Ubersetzen: Gemeinsamkeiten und Unterschiede."
