= League for Women's Equality =

Business card of the League for Women's Equality (in both Russian and French)

All-Russian League for Women's Equality (Russian: Всероссийская лига равноправия женщин) was the most important women's organization in the Russian Empire from 1907 to the October Revolution of 1917. It was officially registered on 6 March 1907. Its membership was restricted to women and generally varied between 1,500 and 2,000 members with main branches in Moscow and Saint Petersburg and several smaller regional chapters, including those in Kharkov and Tomsk. It was governed by a 16-member council serving three-year terms. Many former members and leaders of the Union for Women's Equality joined the league, including Zinaida Mirovich, Anna Kalmanovich, Liudmila Ruttsen, Ariadna Tyrkova-Williams, Jekaterina Shchepkina, and Olga Shapir.

The league combined philanthropic goals, education and mutual aid, with political agenda of equal rights. The league lobbied State Duma and succeeded in passing laws equalizing inheritance rights and removing passport restrictions for married women, but despite multiple efforts failed to pass laws on women's suffrage. The league organized women congresses, including the First All-Russian Women's Congress on 23–29 December 1908 and the First All-Russian Congress on Women's Education on 26 December 1912 – 4 January 1913 in Saint Petersburg. The February Revolution of 1917 and the celebration of the International Women's Day invigorated the league. On 20 March, the league organized a mass demonstration with approximately 40,000 women marching from the City Duma to State Duma. Under the leadership of Poliksena N. Shishkina-Iavein, the League also submitted a Petition to the Russian Provisional Government demanding equal voting and other rights for women under the new regime. Two days later the women received a promise of women's suffrage from Prince Georgy Lvov, head of the Russian Provisional Government. The law was passed on 20 July 1917. The league disintegrated soon after the October Revolution.
