= Richard Simcott =

British polyglot

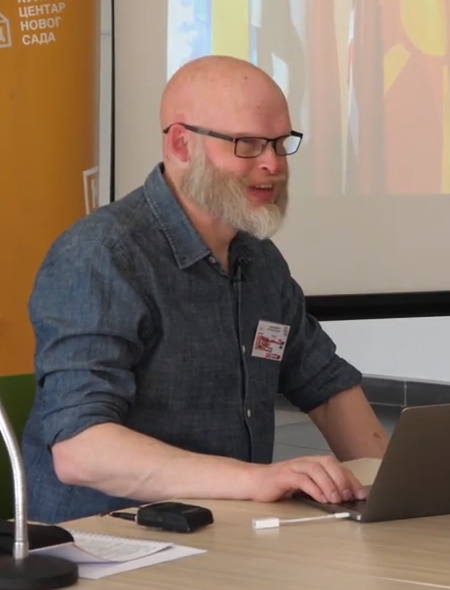
- Born: 1976 or 1977 (age 49–50)
- Known for: Polyglottism

Richard Simcott (born 1976/1977) is a British polyglot who lives in Skopje, North Macedonia. Described by HarperCollins as "One of the most multilingual people from the United Kingdom", he speaks at least 30 languages.

Simcott was a production manager for E-moderation and the languages director for Polpeo, a tool that simulates on-line communication crises. He is the current head of the international Polyglot Conference.

== Early life and background ==
Originally from Chester, Simcott's first language was English. He began learning French in school at the age of five, and since he grew up near the England–Wales border in a family of joint English and Welsh heritage, he learnt Welsh as well. After his father remarried to a Thai woman, he started to learn Thai during his teenage years after visiting Thailand.

Simcott expressed the desire to learn German in school but his teachers would not permit him to learn it along with French. In high school he joined a geography trip to Germany, just to be exposed to the language. He obtained a Spanish GCSE and A-level and did a combined course in French, Spanish, Italian and Portuguese at the University of Hull. He sat in on lectures in Swedish and Old Icelandic and did language exchanges in Romanian and Catalan. He spent time immersing French, Spanish and Italian in Lyon, Málaga and Verona respectively.

After graduation he worked as an au pair in Germany, and cycled to the Netherlands to learn Dutch. While in the Netherlands he took Greek lessons in Rotterdam and Arabic lessons in Leiden. He later studied Czech in Prague. He states that "it turned out that speaking a language abroad with local people was an ideal way to learn, especially in a time before the internet." In 2003 he met his future wife, a Macedonian native with a south-east Slavic languages and literature degree, while on a train through the Balkans, and subsequently moved to Skopje, where he has since become fluent in Macedonian and numerous other languages of southeastern Europe.

== Career ==
Simcott has worked with languages in the UK diplomatic service, and was a production manager for Emoderation as well as being the languages director for Polpea. He has also hosted a range of Polyglot conferences internationally, and is the current head of the annual Polyglot Conference, which he established in 2013, after meeting another polyglot and YouTuber, Luca Lampariello, in Poznań, Poland.

Simcott was interviewed by 16×9 for a short television programme about polyglots. He runs his own blog "Speaking Fluently" and has published a book on French Short Stories. In 2015, the Goethe Institut named him Ambassador for Multilingualism.

== Language abilities ==
Simcott has a knowledge of over 50 languages to various degrees of ability, though regularly speaks around 30 languages in total. He is fluent in at least 16 of them. He speaks English, Macedonian, French, German, Dutch, Spanish, Welsh, Italian, Portuguese, Catalan, Swedish, Romanian, Czech, Russian, Serbian, Serbo-Croatian, Bulgarian, Albanian, Bosnian, Esperanto, Greek, Turkish, Polish, Hebrew, Chinese, Thai, Icelandic, Arabic, Maltese, and Estonian. He is often mistaken for a native speaker in Macedonian, French, German, Dutch and Spanish.

Simcott continues to study languages in a university environment, which differs from other polyglots. In the 2020s he has been learning Korean, Northern Sámi, Scots, Irish, and Cornish.
