= Ariadna Tyrkova-Williams =

Russian feminist revolutionary (1869–1962)

- Historical photo of Tyrkova-Williams
- Born: 13 November 1869; Saint Petersburg, Russian Empire
- Died: 12 January 1962 (aged 92); Washington, D.C., U.S.
- Resting place: Rock Creek Cemetery; Washington, D.C., U.S.
- Other names: Ariadna Borman
- Occupation(s): Politician, journalist, writer, and feminist
- Spouse: Harold Williams
- Children: 2

Ariadna Vladimirovna Tyrkova-Williams (Russian: Ариадна Владимировна Тыркова; November 13, 1869, Saint Petersburg – January 12, 1962, Washington, DC; Ariadna Borman during the first marriage) was a liberal politician, journalist, writer and feminist in Russia during the revolutionary period until 1920. Afterwards, she lived as a writer in Britain (1920–1951) and the United States (1951–1962).

== Biography ==
=== Revolutionary beginnings ===
Ariadna Vladimirovna Tyrkova was born on 13 November 1869, the daughter of Vladimir Tyrkov, a landowner whose hereditary estate was Vergezhi in the Novgorod region. She studied in Saint Petersburg.

There she married A. N. Borman, an engineer, and with him had a son, Arcadiy (b. 1891). In the early 1900s, she became active among liberal opposition groups linked to Pyotr Struve's periodical, Osvobozhdenie ('Liberty'), and in 1904 was arrested while trying to smuggle 400 copies of Osvobozhdenie into Russia. Later the same year, she was arrested again, sentenced to 30 months in prison and fled to Stuttgart, where she met Williams; together they moved to Paris. At the end of the year Williams was sent to St Petersburg. His wife would follow. Returning to Russia under the general amnesty granted by the October Manifesto during the Russian Revolution of 1905, she helped found the Constitutional Democratic party (also known as the Kadet Party), and in 1906 became a member of its Central Committee.

=== Between the Revolutions ===
In 1906, she married Harold Williams (1876–1928), a New Zealand-British Slavist who was working as a journalist in Saint Petersburg for the Morning Post. The same year she joined the All-Russian Union for Women's Equality and, with Ekaterina Kuskova, became a leading campaigner for equal rights for women, prompting the Constitutional Democratic party to add women's suffrage to its platform.

After the defeat of the revolution in late 1907, Tyrkova-Williams moved to the far Right of the Constitutional Democratic party, and advocated an alliance with the Progressive faction in the State Duma and the Left wing of the Octobrist party.

In 1911, the family was briefly embroiled in controversy, when Harold Williams was accused of espionage, supposedly as a result of Russian secret police machinations.

During World War I, she worked in the All-Russian Union of Cities. She also spent a year in Turkey and wrote a book about her experiences there (Staraya Turtsia, 1916).

=== 1917 Revolution and emigration ===
On March 17, 1917, immediately after the February Revolution, Tyrkova-Williams was elected a member of the Petrograd Committee of the Kadet party. She coordinated party publications in Petrograd, and in the summer of 1917 was elected to the Petrograd Duma, where she led the Constitutional Democratic faction. In August, she became a member of the Democratic Conference, and in September was elected to the Pre-Parliament. After the Bolshevik seizure of power during the October Revolution of 1917 she ran for the Constituent Assembly in November elections, and, with Alexander Izgoev, briefly edited the newspaper, Borba, until it was shut down by the Bolshevik government.

After the dissolution of the Constituent Assembly by the Bolsheviks, she helped organize anti-Bolshevik resistance in southern Russia. But in the spring of 1918, she emigrated to Britain, and in 1919 published an account of the first year of the Russian revolution, From Liberty to Brest-Litovsk, before returning to Russia in the spring, when Harold Williams was sent to the areas controlled by Gen. Anton Denikin to report on the progress of the White Movement. By then, she had moved further to the Right, and wrote:

We must support the army first and place the democratic programs in the background. We must create a ruling class and not a dictatorship of the majority. The universal hegemony of Western democracy is a fraud, which politicians have foisted upon us. We must have the courage to look directly into the eye of the wild beast—which is called the people.

In late 1919, General Denikin was defeated, and Tyrkova-Williams returned to Britain in 1920.

In London, she became a founder of the London-based Russian Liberation Committee, edited its publications, and raised money for Russian orphans. In November 1928, her husband died. Afterwards she wrote a biography of Alexander Pushkin (Zhizn' Pushkina, 2 vols., 1928–1929), and a book about her late husband (Cheerful Giver, 1935).

After the second World War, in March 1951, she migrated to the United States of America and later published three volumes of memoirs (1952, 1954, 1956) in Russian.

Ariadna Tyrkova-Williams died on 12 January 1962 in Washington DC and was buried there in Rock Creek Cemetery.

== Sources ==
- See Shmuel Galai. The Liberation Movement in Russia 1900-1905, Cambridge University Press, ISBN 978-0-521-52647-0 p. 192.
- See Barbara Alpern-Engel. "Women in Revolutionary Russia, 1861-1926" in Political and Historical Encyclopedia of Women, ed. Christine Faure, Routledge, 2003, ISBN 978-1-57958-237-1 p. 255. (First edition as Encyclopédie politique et historique des femmes, Paris, Presses Universitaires de France, 1997, ISBN 978-2-13-048316-8)
- See Adele Marie Barker and Jehanne M. Gheith. A History of Women's Writing in Russia, Cambridge University Press, 2002, ISBN 978-0-521-57280-4 p. 177
- See Melissa Stockdale. "The Constitutional Democratic Party" in Russia Under the Last Tsar, edited by Anna Geifman, Blackwell Publishers Ltd, 1999, ISBN 978-1-55786-995-1 pp. 164–169.
- See Keith Neilson. "Only a d...d marionette? The influence of ambassadors on British Foreign Policy, 1904-1914" in Diplomacy and World Power: Studies in British Foreign Policy, 1890-1951, eds. Brian J. C. McKercher and Michael L. Dockrill, Cambridge University Press, 1996, ISBN 978-0-521-52934-1 p. 66
- See Ariadna Tyrkova-Williams. Staraya Turtsia i Mladoturki: god v Konstantinopole, Petrograd, Tip. B. M. Volfa, 1916, p. 179
- Quoted in Ronald Grigor Suny. The Soviet Experiment: Russia, the USSR, and the Successor States, Oxford University Press, 1998, ISBN 978-0-19-508105-3 p. 80
- See the Tyrkova-Williams Collection at the British Library
- For a comparison of Tyrkova-Williams' biography of Pushkin with the one published in the Soviet Union by Yuri Tynianov at the same time, see Alexandra Smith. "Conformist by Circumstance v. Formalist at Heart: Some Observations on Tynianov's Novel Pushkin", in Neo-Formalist Papers: Contributions to the Silver Jubilee Conference to Mark 25 Years of the Neo-Formalist Circle, eds. Joe Andrew and Robert Reid, Amsterdam-Atlanta, Rodopi B. V., 1998, ISBN 978-90-420-0631-7 p. 305

== Works ==
- Staraya Turtsia i Mladoturki: God v Konstantinopole, Petrograd, Tip. B. M. Volfa, 1916, 179p.
- From Liberty to Brest-Litovsk, the First Year of the Russian Revolution, London, Macmillan, 1919, 526p.
  - Second edition Westport, CT, Hyperion Press, 1977, ISBN 0-88355-448-8, 526 p.
- Cheerful Giver: The Life of Harold Williams, by his wife, Ariadna Tyrkova-Williams, London, P. Davies, 1935, xii, 337 p.
- Na Putyakh k Svobode, New York, Izd-vo im. Chekhova, 1952, 429p.
- To, chego bol'she ne budet, Paris, Vozrozhdenie, [1954], 267p.
- Zhizn' Pushkina (Life of Pushkin) vol. 1 (1799–1824), vol. 2 (1824–1837), Paris, Sklad izd. Knizhnyi magazin Vozrozhdeniia, 1929.
  - 2nd edition, Paris, YMCA Press, 1948.
  - 3rd edition, Moscow, Molodaia Gvardiia, 1998, ISBN 5-235-02310-2 (set), ISBN 5-235-02301-3 (v. 1), ISBN 5-235-02302-1 (v. 2)

== See also ==
- Harold Williams (her husband)
