= Ziad Fazah =

Liberian-born Lebanese polyglot (born 1954)

- زياد فصاح
- Born: June 10, 1954 (age 72); Monrovia, Liberia
- Known for: His claim of being able to speak, read, and understand 59 languages

Ziad Youssef Fazah (Arabic: زياد فصاح; born 10 June 1954) is a Liberian-born Lebanese alleged hyperpolyglot. Fazah has claimed to speak 59 languages and maintains that he has proved this in several public appearances in which he supposedly communicated with native speakers of a large number of foreign languages. Fazah spoke Arabic at home and learned French and English in school. Fazah decided to study languages after encountering Armenians in Lebanon and learning Armenian. He currently lives in Brazil, having lived there since 1971.

The Guinness Book of World Records, up to the 1998 edition, listed Fazah as being able to speak and read 58 languages, citing a live interview in Athens, Greece in July 1991, but has since removed his name from any language-linked records.

== Polyglot claims ==
Ziad Fazah has claimed that he can speak, read, write and understand the following languages:

1. Albanian
2. Amharic
3. Arabic
4. Armenian
5. Azerbaijani
6. Bengali
7. Bulgarian
8. Burmese
9. Cantonese
10. Czech
11. Danish
12. Dutch
13. Dzongkha / Bhutanese
14. English
15. Fijian
16. Finnish
17. French
18. German
19. Greek
20. Hebrew
21. Hindi
22. Hungarian
23. Icelandic
24. Indonesian
25. Italian
26. Japanese
27. Khmer
28. Korean
29. Kyrgyz
30. Lao
31. Malagasy
32. Malay
33. Maltese
34. Mandarin
35. Mongolian
36. Nepali
37. Norwegian
38. Pashto
39. Papiamento
40. Persian
41. Polish
42. Portuguese
43. Romanian
44. Russian
45. Samoan
46. Serbo-Croatian
47. Shanghainese (dialect of Wu Chinese)
48. Singlish
49. Sinhala
50. Spanish
51. Standard Tibetan
52. Swahili
53. Swedish
54. Tajik
55. Thai
56. Turkish
57. Urdu
58. Uzbek
59. Vietnamese

Ziad is also proficient with reading and writing in Latin, but does not speak it.

== Viva el Lunes test ==
In 1997, Fazah's polyglot abilities were tested in the Chilean TV program Viva el lunes. The program was in Spanish and ambassadors and other guests from all over the world asked him questions in Egyptian Arabic, Finnish, Russian, Chinese, Persian, Hindi and Greek. He failed in fully understanding and properly answering all of them but the first in his native Arabic.

Selection of failed questions
Language	Original	Translated	Notes
Greek	Πόσες μέρες θα μείνετε εδώ στη Χιλή;	How many days are you going to stay here in Chile?	—N/a
Russian	Какой сегодня день недели?	What day of the week is it today?	Fazah only repeated the word "какой?".
Persian	می‌خواهم از آقای زیاد سؤال کنم که شما در آموختن زبان فارسی, فقط لغات عادی را یاد گرفتید, یا این که, سعی کردید, در فرهنگ فارسی را رخنه کرده فمثلاً, بعضی از شعرای فارسی را بشناسید؟	I want to ask Mr. Ziad if in order to learn the Persian language, did you learn only the simple words or did you try to get into Persian culture, for example, to know some Persian poets?	The ambassador also sung the song Ey Iran, the anthem of the Interim Government of Iran.
Finnish	Mm. Koko maailmassa on noin viisi miljoonaa ihmistä, jotka puhuvat suomen kieltä. Varmaan myös tiedät, että Suomessa puhutaan virallisesti suomea, ruotsia ja saamen kieltä. Tiedätte varmaan myös – tunnette suomalaista kulttuuria. Nyt kysyn teiltä, mistä pidätte eniten suomalaisessa kulttuurissa? Mikä on Suomessa parasta?	In the whole world there are about 5 million people who speak Finnish. You probably also know that the officially spoken languages in Finland are Finnish, Swedish and the Sami language. Also, you probably know about Finnish culture. Now, I ask you, what do you like the most in Finnish culture? What's best in Finland?	—N/a
Mandarin	在月球上，能够看到唯一的地球上的人造工程是什么？	What is the only man-made structure visible from the moon?	The purported answer was the Great Wall of China. (Note: This factoid has been refuted.)
Hindi	जिओ सोमवार	Long Live Monday!	Name of the show he was on, Viva el lunes.

Besides failing to understand the question or any of the spoken Persian, Fazah also failed the reading test in Persian he was given, as he pronounced the letters as one would in Arabic, which is inaccurate since the Persian alphabet is unique, with additional letters not found in Arabic.

In a 2020 interview, Fazah defended himself regarding this event, which he called a "betrayal". He claimed that the show's organizers did not inform him he would be tested and even that it would be conducted in languages other than Spanish, so he did not have time to prepare himself to properly answer the questions.

== See also ==
- List of polyglots
- Polyglotism
