= Union for Women's Equality =

Feminist organisation in the Russian Empire

All-Russian Union for Women's Equality (Russian: Всероссийский союз равноправия женщин) was a liberal feminist organisation formed in the Russian Empire during the Russian Revolution of 1905. The Union demanded equal political, particularly voting, rights to women. The Union had main centers in Moscow and Saint Petersburg and a number of local chapters in various cities of the Empire. At its peak in 1906, the Union had 8,000 members and 78 branches in 65 cities. The Union published monthly magazine Women's Union (Союз женщин) in 1907–09. The Union disintegrated soon after the end of the revolution. Despite lack of tangible feminist achievements, the Union succeeded in raising awareness and political consciousness of many women in the Russian Empire.

== Formation and goals ==
The Union was formed by 30 liberal women a month after the Bloody Sunday (22 January 1905). The founding members included Zinaida Mirovich, Anna Kalmanovich, Liubov Gurevich, and Maria Chekhova. They felt that liberal organizations, like the Union of Liberation, were indifferent about women's rights.

On 10 April, the Union called the first meeting for women in Moscow. About 1,000 attendees laid the groundwork for the first congress of the Union on 7–10 May. The congress, chaired by Anna Miliukova (wife of Pavel Milyukov), was attended by some 300 official delegates, including 70 delegates sent from 26 local chapters, who adopted a far-reaching program that underscored that liberation of women was inseparable from liberation of the society as a whole. The Union did not focus solely on women's issues and joined the wider liberal movement, consciously using the term "women's liberation" and not "feminist". The program demanded a constituent assembly elected by equal, direct, secret, and universal voting (without regard to sex, nationality or religion), national autonomy for ethnic minorities, and abolition of the death penalty in addition to more women-oriented demands of equality before law, equal rights in any land reform, law protection and welfare guarantees for women workers, and co-education at every level. The issue of national autonomy was divisive: the Russian women were surprised by the importance of the autonomy for Ukrainian, Polish, Lithuanian, Jewish, and Belarusian women. The next congress was held on 8–12 October 1905. The third congress was held on 21–24 May 1906.

== Activities ==
The Union petitioned City Dumas and zemstva to grant women voting rights. In May 1905, along with thirteen other unions, the Union became a founding member of the Union of Unions, an umbrella organization for trade and professional unions. It also joined the International Woman Suffrage Alliance and sent delegates to its congresses in Copenhagen (August 1906) and Amsterdam (June 1908). In various cities women organized meetings, wrote petitions, collected signatures, and presented them to various political institutions, including the State Duma. They lobbied various organizations to add women's suffrage to their agenda, but reception among male organizations was lukewarm as many supported women's rights in principle, but argued that in practice it was an inopportune moment to raise the issue. At the request of some sympathetic Duma delegates, the Union prepared specific recommendation on amending the legal code to incorporate women's rights, but the Duma was dissolved before further action could be taken.

During the height of the revolution, including the Moscow Uprising of 1905, members of the Union actively supported the revolutionaries by fundraising, organizing first aid stations and canteens, marching in demonstrations and maintaining the barricades. Women also worked with other organizations, such as Red Cross, Union of Unions, and Unemployment Commission. The Union's budget for 1905–06 was 3,800 rubles, of which 1,000 rubles designated to support other organizations and strikers. In Fall 1906, the Saint Petersburg branch organized an agitation lecture tour; most popular lectures attracted audiences of up to 800. In 1907, the Union distributed 10,000 pamphlets and books in the countryside. Since not all women were literate, joint readings were organized.

== Disintegration ==
While the Union's program reflected attempts to include issues relevant to both working class (welfare guarantees) and peasant women (equality in land reform), it had difficulty in attracting their participation and retaining their loyalty. The class solidarity was more important than gender unity. Internal disagreements and introduction of reactionary repressions by the Tsarist authorities led to quick dwindling of the Union. The Union was never officially registered as an organization. The journal Women's Union was discontinued in December 1909. It its mission, the Union was succeeded by the League for Women’s Equality.
