= Timeline of Omsk =

General chronology of events and population

The following is a timeline of the history of the city of Omsk, Russia.

== Prior to 20th century ==
- 1716 - Omsk fortress established.
- 1782 - Omsk becomes a city by this time.
- 1792 - The Lutheran Church of the Holy Catherine built.
- 1804 - Town chartered.
- 1808 - Siberian Cossack Army headquartered in Omsk.
- 1813 - Cossack school founded.
- 1823 - Fire.
- 1825 - A group of Decembrists are exiled to Omsk. Notable among the exiles was Fyodor Dostoevsky.
- 1827 - Agricultural research institute established.
- 1839 - Capital of western Siberia relocated to Omsk from Tobolsk.
- 1843 - St. Nicholas Cossack Cathedral built.
- 1876 - Omsk Drama Theatre established.
- 1877 - Russian Geographical Society's west Siberian branch established.
- 1878 - Omsk History Museum founded.
- 1881 - Population: 31,000.
- 1887 - Population: 33,847.
- 1895 - Trans-Siberian Railway begins operating.
- 1897 - Population: 37,470.
- 1898 - Assumption Cathedral consecrated.
- 1900 - Population: 53,050.

== 20th century ==
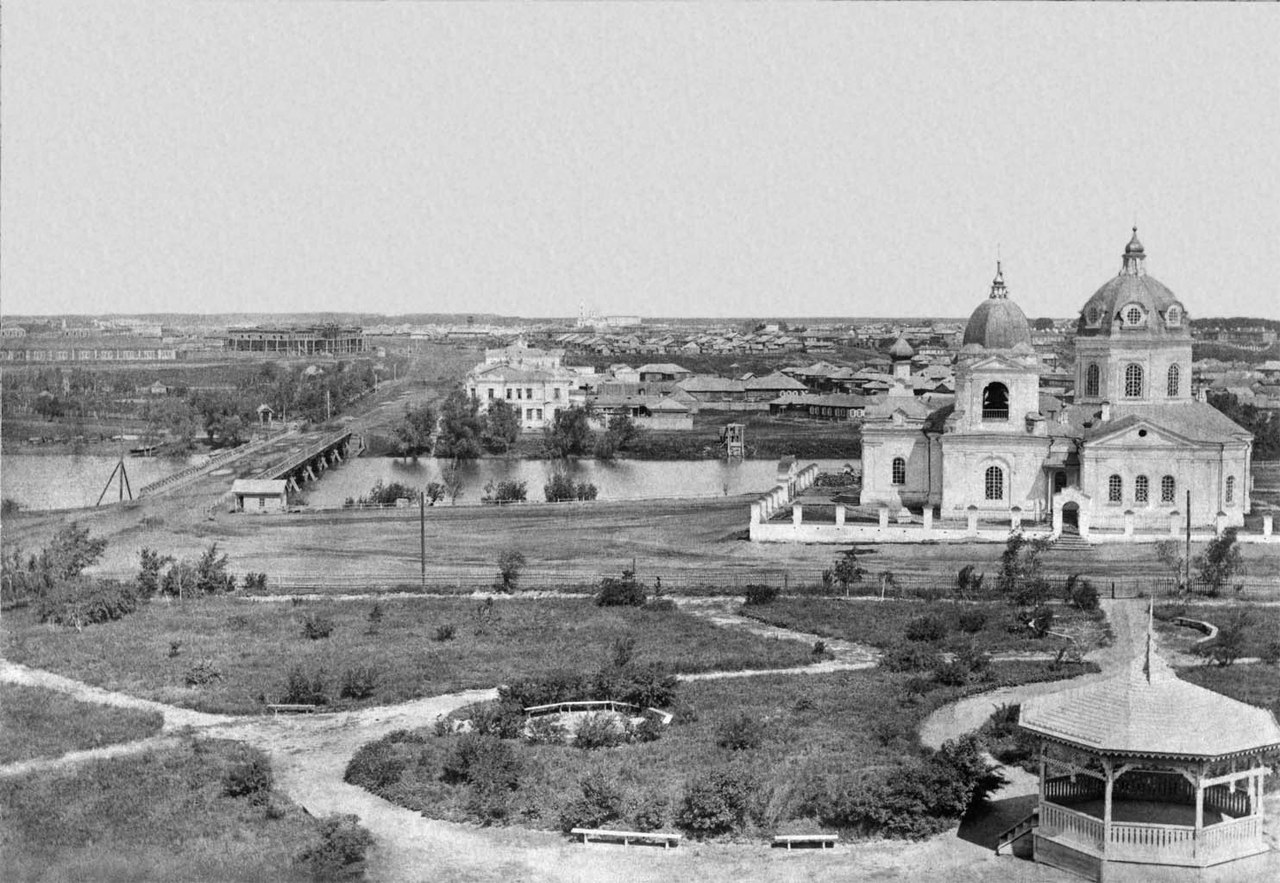
Omsk before 1905

- 1913 - Population: 135,800.
- 1917 - 25 April–7 May: Congress of Kazakhs of the Akmolinsk Oblast held.

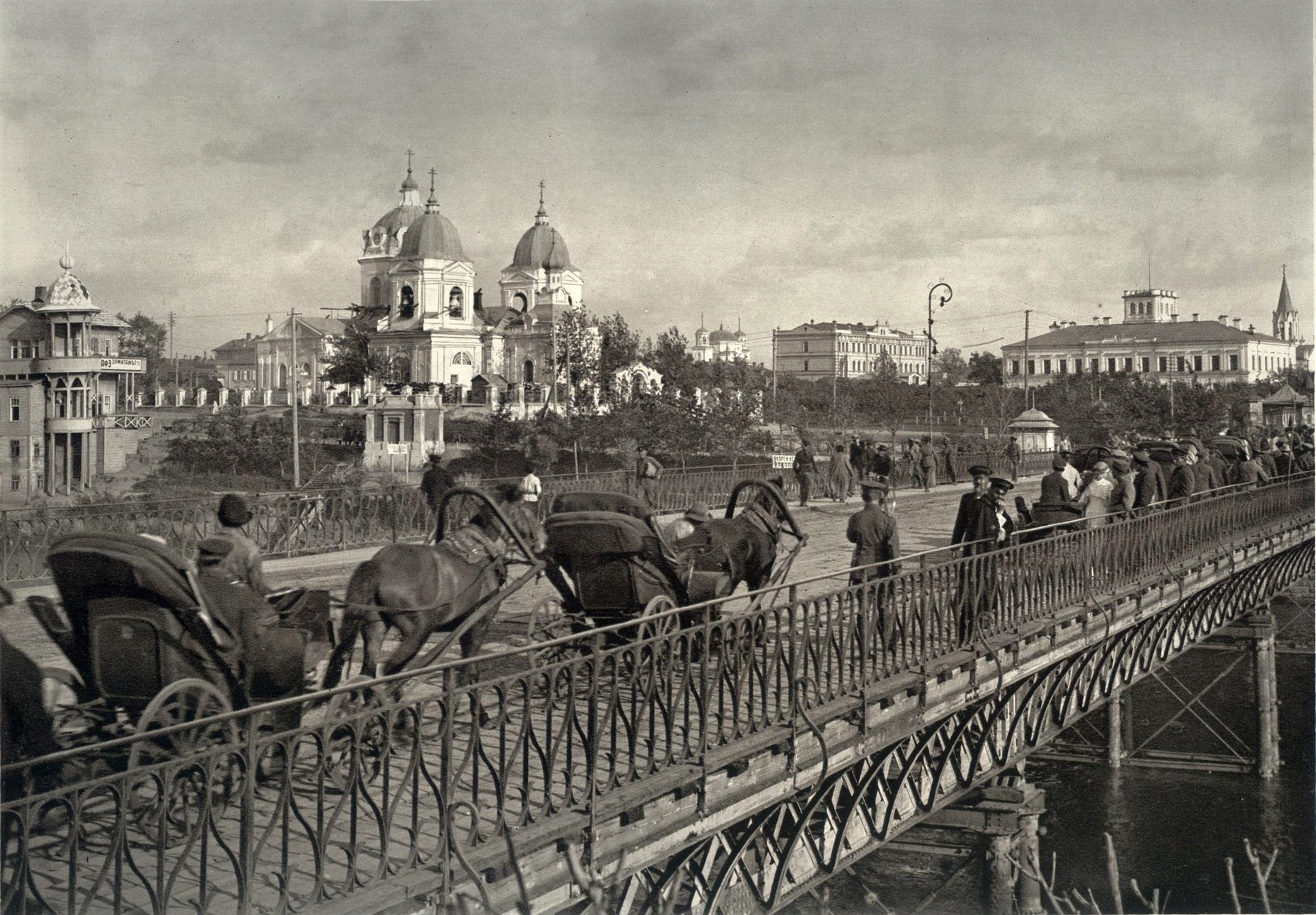
Omsk in 1918

- 1918 - November: Provisional All-Russian Government headquartered in Omsk.
- 1919
  - Kazakh newspaper Kazakh Sozi published in Omsk.
  - 14 November: Red Army takes city.
  - Union of Chinese Workers formed.
- 1927 - Agricultural Institute's Botanical Garden established.
- 1929 - Omsk Tsentralny Airport begins operating.
- 1933 - Kirov District, Omsk established.
- 1934 - City becomes part of the Omsk Oblast.
- 1935 - Assumption Cathedral demolished; Pioneer's Square laid out.
- 1937 - Omsk Children's Theatre founded.
- 1939 - Population: 280,716.
- 1946 - Football Club Irtysh Omsk formed.
- 1950 - Spartak Omsk ice hockey team formed.
- 1955 - Oil refinery begins operating in vicinity.
- 1965 - Population: 721,000.
- 1966 - Red Star Stadium (Omsk) opens.
- 1973 - Omsk State Circus founded.
- 1974 - Omsk State University established.
- 1983 - Literature museum founded.
- 1985 - Population: 1,108,000.
- 1986 - Blinov Sports and Concerts Complex opens.
- 1989 - Population: 1,148,418.
- 1990 - Siberian International Marathon begins.
- 1991
  - Omsk City Art Museum founded.
  - Leonid Polezhayev becomes governor of Omsk Oblast.
  - Yuri Shoikhet becomes mayor.
- 1992 - Omsk Metro construction begins.
- 1993 - Omsk State Pedagogical University active.
- 1994 - Valerii Roshchupkin becomes mayor.
- 2000 - City becomes part of the Siberian Federal District.

== 21st century ==
- 2001 - Evgeniy Belov (Russian politician) becomes mayor.
- 2005 - Viktor Shreider becomes mayor.
- 2007
  - Arena Omsk opens.
  - Assumption Cathedral reconstructed.
- 2010 - Population: 1,153,971.
- 2012 - Vyacheslav Dvorakovsky becomes mayor.

== See also ==
- Omsk history
- History of Omsk
- Timelines of other cities in the Siberian Federal District of Russia: Novosibirsk

== Bibliography ==
- "West Siberian Railway: Omsk". Guide to the Great Siberian Railway. St. Petersburg: Ministry of Ways of Communication. 1900.
- "Omsk", Chambers's Encyclopaedia, London: W. & R. Chambers, 1901, hdl:2027/uc2.ark:/13960/t3bz6g65j – via HathiTrust
- "Omsk" . Encyclopædia Britannica. Vol. 20 (11th ed.). 1910. p. 104.
- William Henry Beable (1919), "Omsk", Russian Gazetteer and Guide, London: Russian Outlook
- Neil J. Melvin (1998). "Consolidation of a New Regional Elite: The Case of Omsk 1987-1995". Europe-Asia Studies. 50 (4): 619–650. doi:10.1080/09668139808412557. JSTOR 153780.
