= Siberian Institute of Business and Information Technology =

Non-state university in Omsk Russia

The Siberian Institute of Business and Information Technology (Russian: Сибирский институт бизнеса и информационных технологий) is a non-state university in Omsk, Russia, founded in 1996.

== History ==
The Siberian Institute of Business and Information Technology is one from the first non-state higher education institute of the Western Siberia. The institute has got the license to conduct educational activities in 1996. In 2001 it passed the first state certification and accreditation and began to issue state-recognized diplomas.

Since the beginning the institute was developing the international collaboration, especially with London Business School and Beijing University of International Business and Economics.

For today the institute develops e-learning and distance learning technologies actively and is in the top 100 Russian universities according to average salary level of its alumni^{2}.

== Training directions ==
There are bachelor's and master's programs in the institute. At bachelor's degree program there are such training directions as:

- Civil law
- Criminal law
- Accounting, analysis and audit
- Finance and credit
- Economy of organization
- Management of the oil and gas industry
- Business administration
- Management of organization
- Marketing
- Financial management
- Organization personnel management
- State and municipal management
- Applied information science in economics

At master's degree program there are such training directions as:

- Economy of the firm
- Business administration
- State and municipal management
