= 60 Years Victory Bridge =

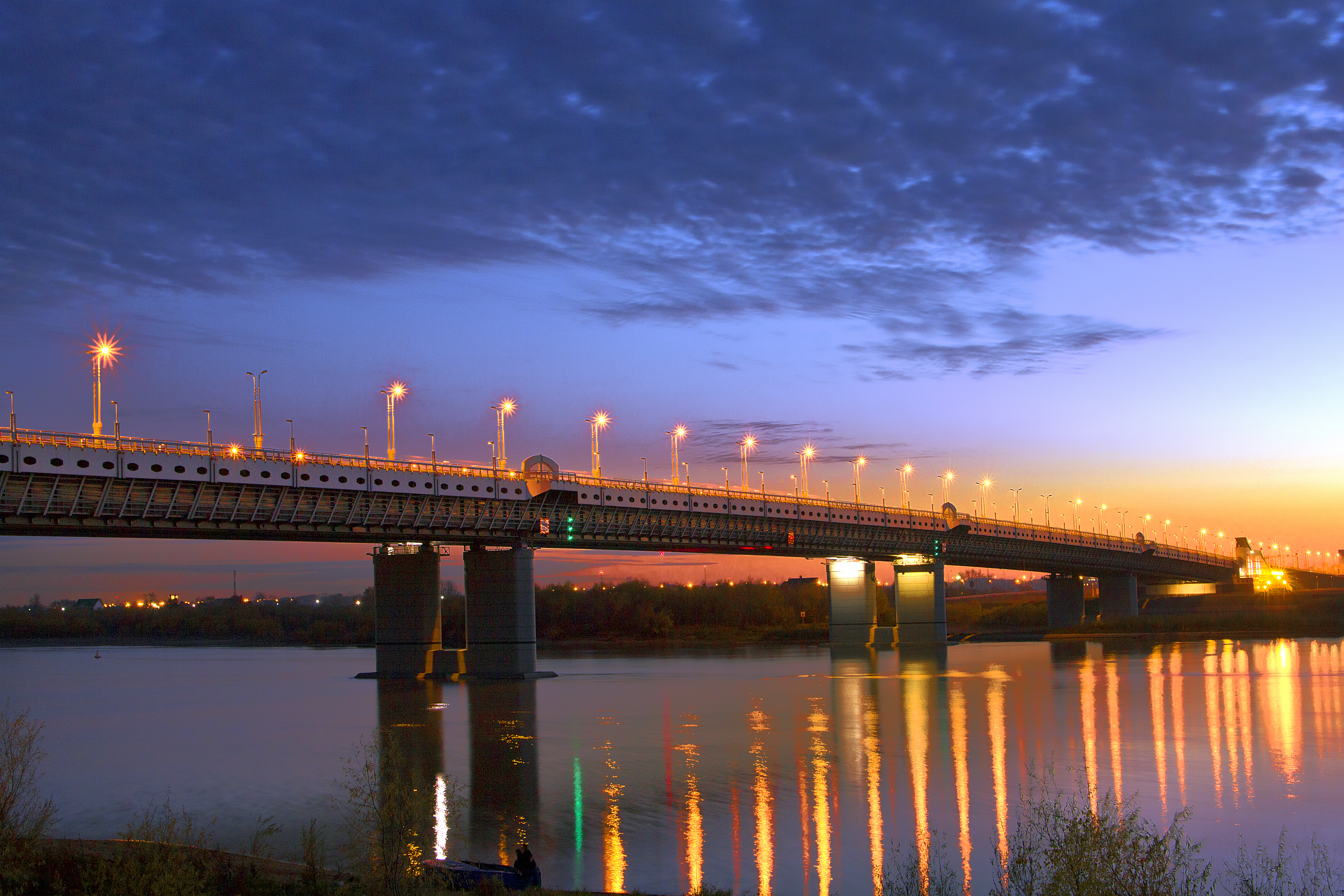
- Coordinates: 54.990°N 73.350°E
- Carries: metro, automobile
- Crosses: Irtysh
- Locale: Omsk
- Structurae ID: 20058674

Characteristics
- Design: Girder bridge
- Material: Steel
- Pier construction: Reinforced concrete
- Total length: 648 metres (2,126 ft)
- Width: 32 metres (105 ft)
- No. of lanes: Road deck: 6; Metro deck: 2

History
- Construction start: 1993
- Construction end: 2005
- Opened: October 18, 2005

Location
- Interactive map of 60 Years Victory Bridge

The 60 Years Victory Bridge (popular name "Metrobridge") is a combined automobile and metro bridge across the Irtysh River in Omsk. The bridge was intended for transportation between the Zarechnaya and Pushkin Library stations of the Omsk Metro. The automobile portion of the bridge connects Frunze and Koneva Streets.

== History ==
Construction on the bridge started in 1993, but construction was slow due to a lack of funding from the federal government. On December 28, 2000, the governor of the Omsk region allocated funds to the bridge from the regional budget, speeding up construction.

In September 2004, the governor of the Omsk region renamed the bridge to the 60 Years Victory Bridge. The bridge opened on October 18, 2005.
