= Omsk-Severnyy (air base) =

Airport in Russia

Omsk-Severnyy
- Omsk, Omsk Oblast in Russia
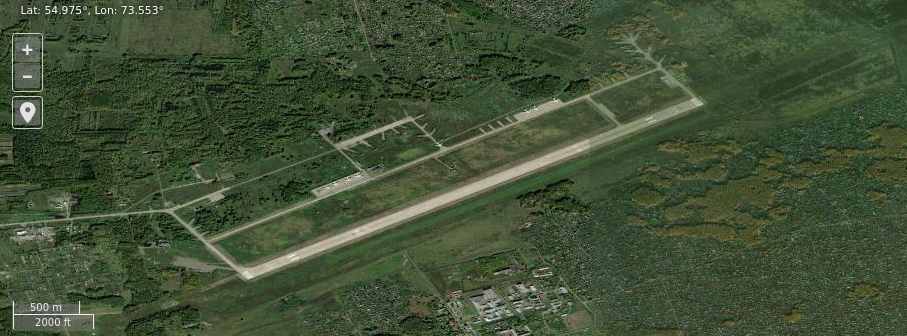
- Satellite imagery of Omsk-Severnyy airbase

Site information
- Type: Air Base
- Owner: Ministry of Defence
- Operator: Russian Air Force

Location
- Shown within Omsk Oblast Omsk-Severnyy (Russia)
- Coordinates: 54°58′31″N 73°33′09″E

Site history
- Built: 1956
- In use: 1956 - present

Airfield information
- Elevation: 10 metres (33 ft) AMSL
Runways
Direction	Length and surface
04/22	3,000 metres (9,843 ft) Concrete

Omsk-Severnyy is an airbase of the Russian Air Force located near Omsk, Omsk Oblast, Russia.

The base was home to the 64th Fighter Aviation Regiment between 1956 and 1998 with the Mikoyan MiG-31 (ASCC: Foxhound).

== See also ==
- List of military airbases in Russia
