= Omsk =

City in Omsk Oblast, Russia

Omsk Омск
- City
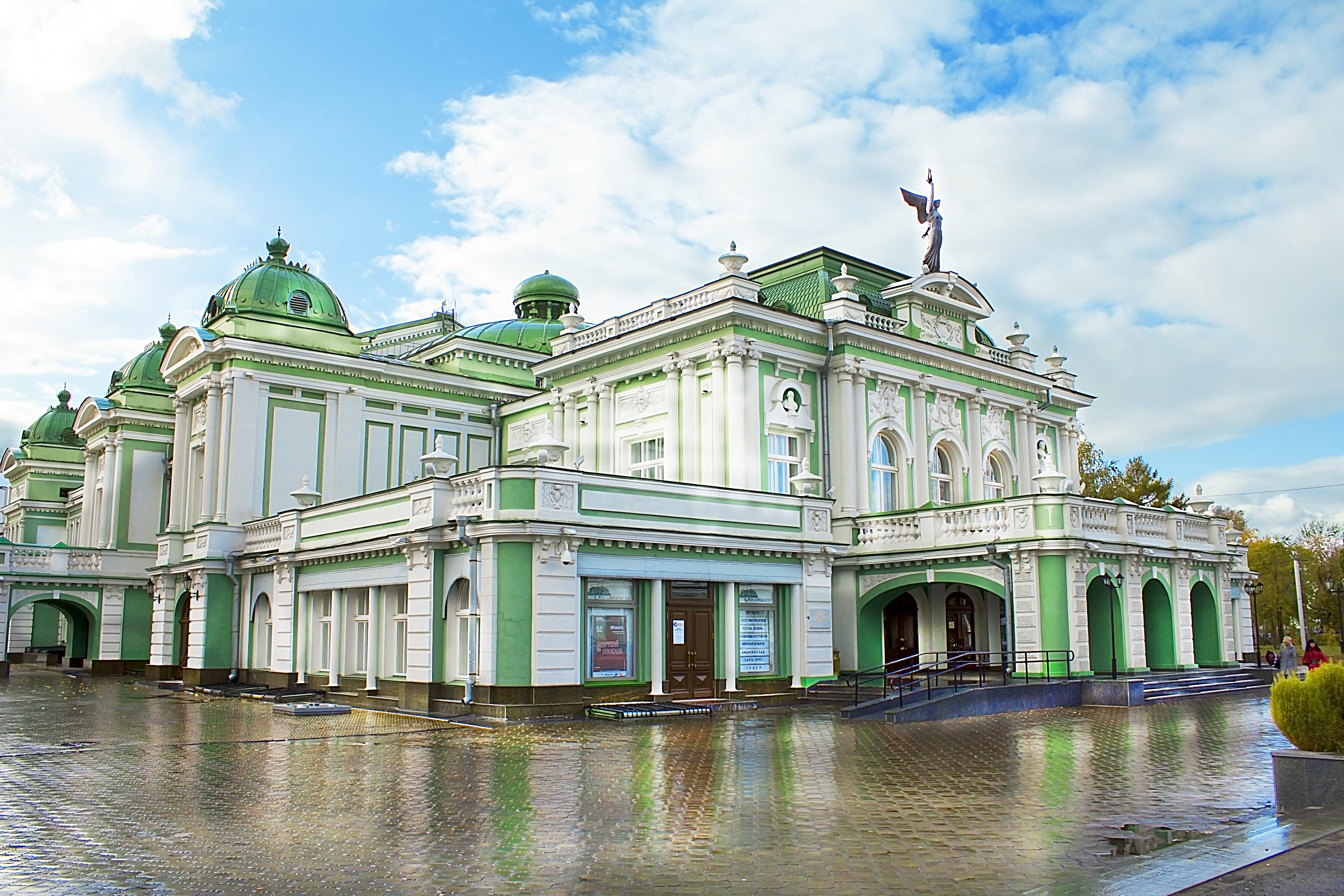
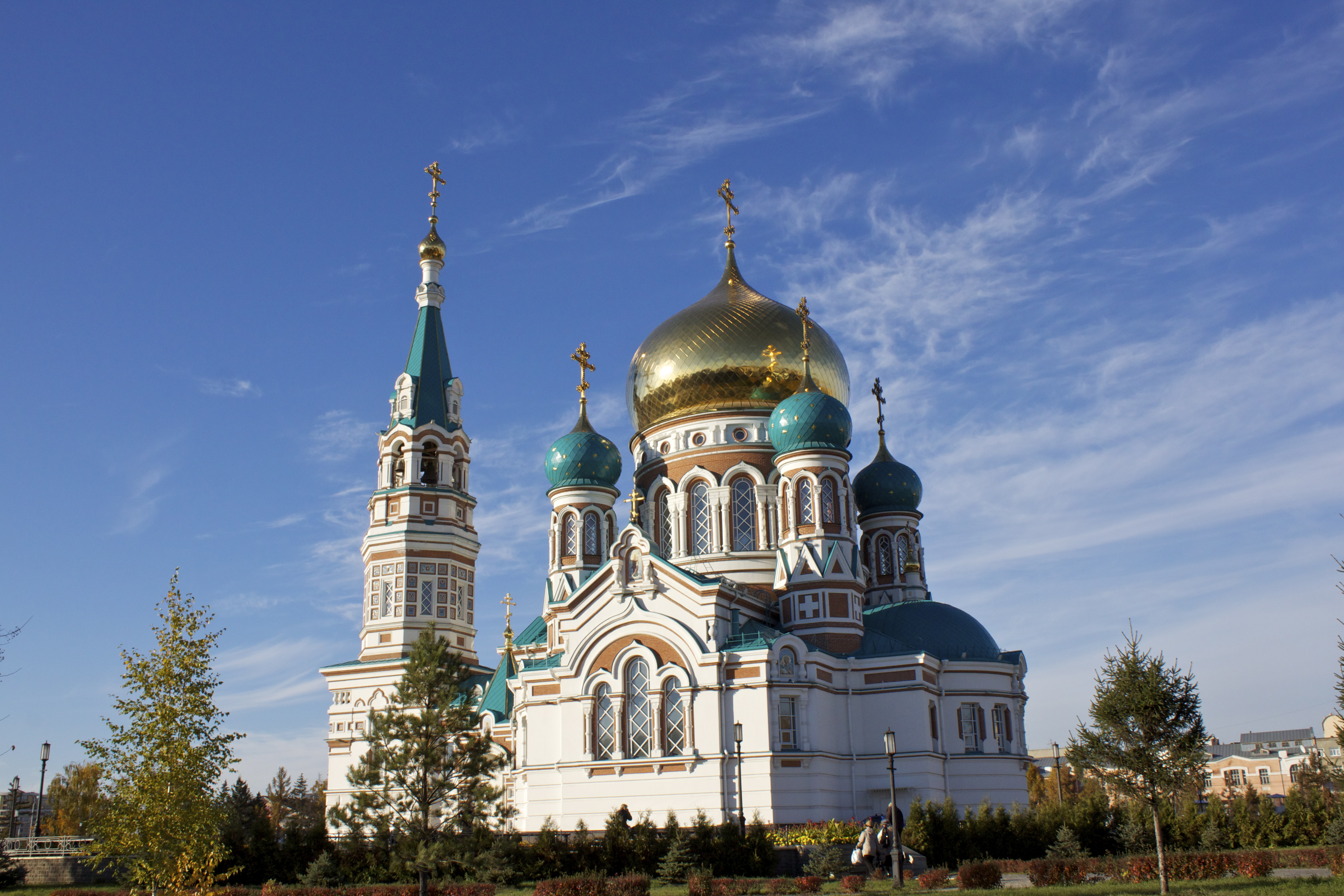
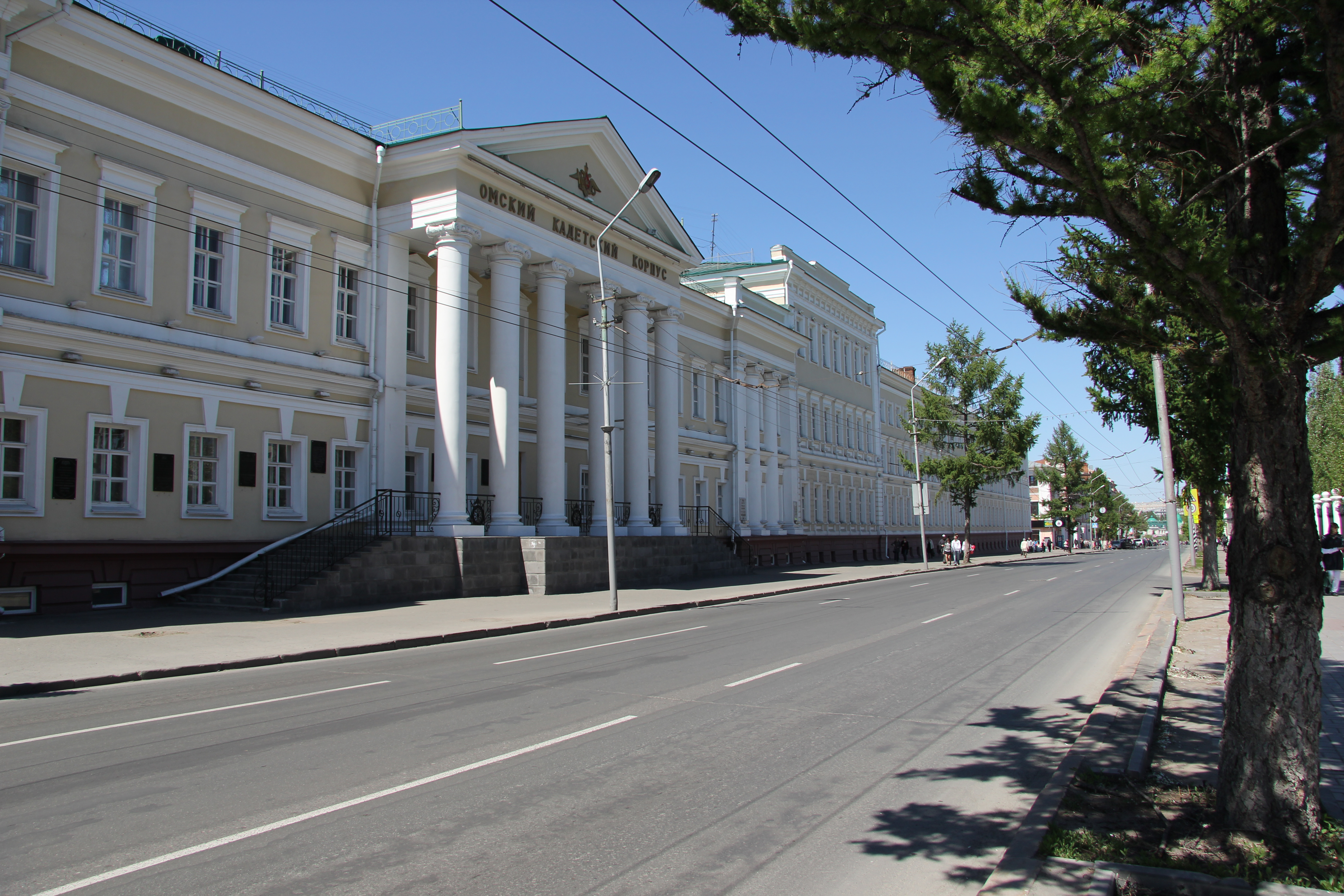
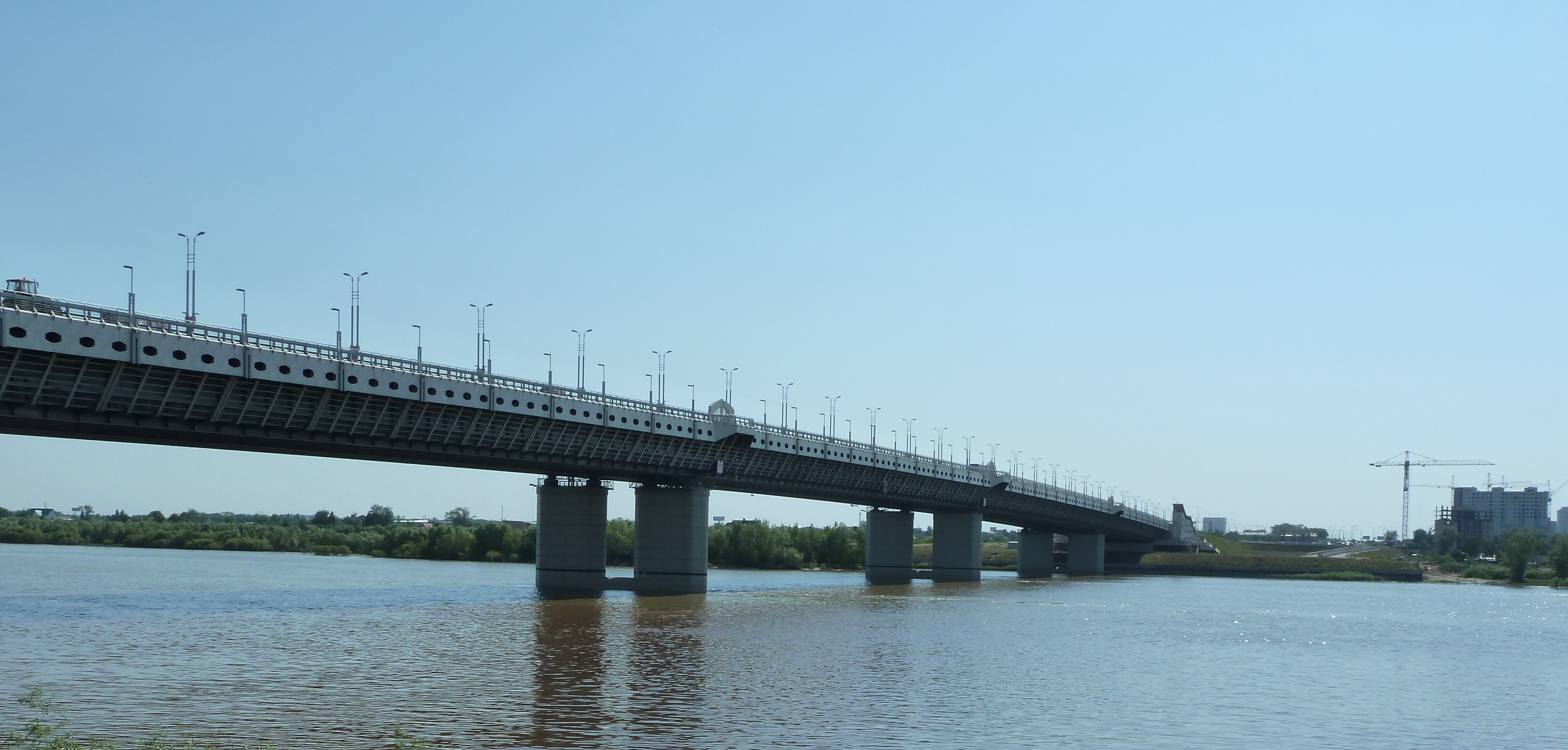
- Chokan Valikhanov Street Omsk State Academic Drama Theater Omsk railway station Dormition Cathedral Omsk Cadet Military Corps 60 Years Victory Bridge

- Flag Coat of arms
- Interactive map of Omsk
- Location of Omsk Omsk (Omsk Oblast)
- Coordinates: 54°59′N 73°22′E
- Country: Russia
- Federal subject: Omsk Oblast
- Founded: August 2, 1716
- City status since: 1782

Government
  - Body: City Council
  - Mayor: Sergey Shelest

Area
  - Total: 566.9 km^{2} (218.9 sq mi)
- Elevation: 87 m (285 ft)

Population (2010 Census)
  - Total: 1,154,116
  - Estimate (2025): 1,101,367 (−4.6%)
  - Rank: 7th in 2010
  - Density: 2,036/km^{2} (5,273/sq mi)

Administrative status
  - Subordinated to: city of oblast significance of Omsk
  - Capital of: Omsk Oblast, city of oblast significance of Omsk

Municipal status
  - Urban okrug: Omsk Urban Okrug
  - Capital of: Omsk Urban Okrug
- Time zone: UTC+6 (MSK+3)
- Postal code: 644xxx
- Dialing code: +7 3812
- OKTMO ID: 52701000001
- City Day: First Saturday of August
- Website: admomsk.ru

Omsk (Note: /ˈɒmsk/; Russian: Омск; IPA: [omsk]) is the administrative center and largest city of Omsk Oblast, Russia. It is situated in southwestern Siberia and has a population of over one million. Omsk is the third largest city in Siberia after Novosibirsk and Krasnoyarsk, and the twelfth-largest city in Russia. It is an important transport node, serving as a train station for the Trans-Siberian Railway and as a staging post for the Irtysh River.

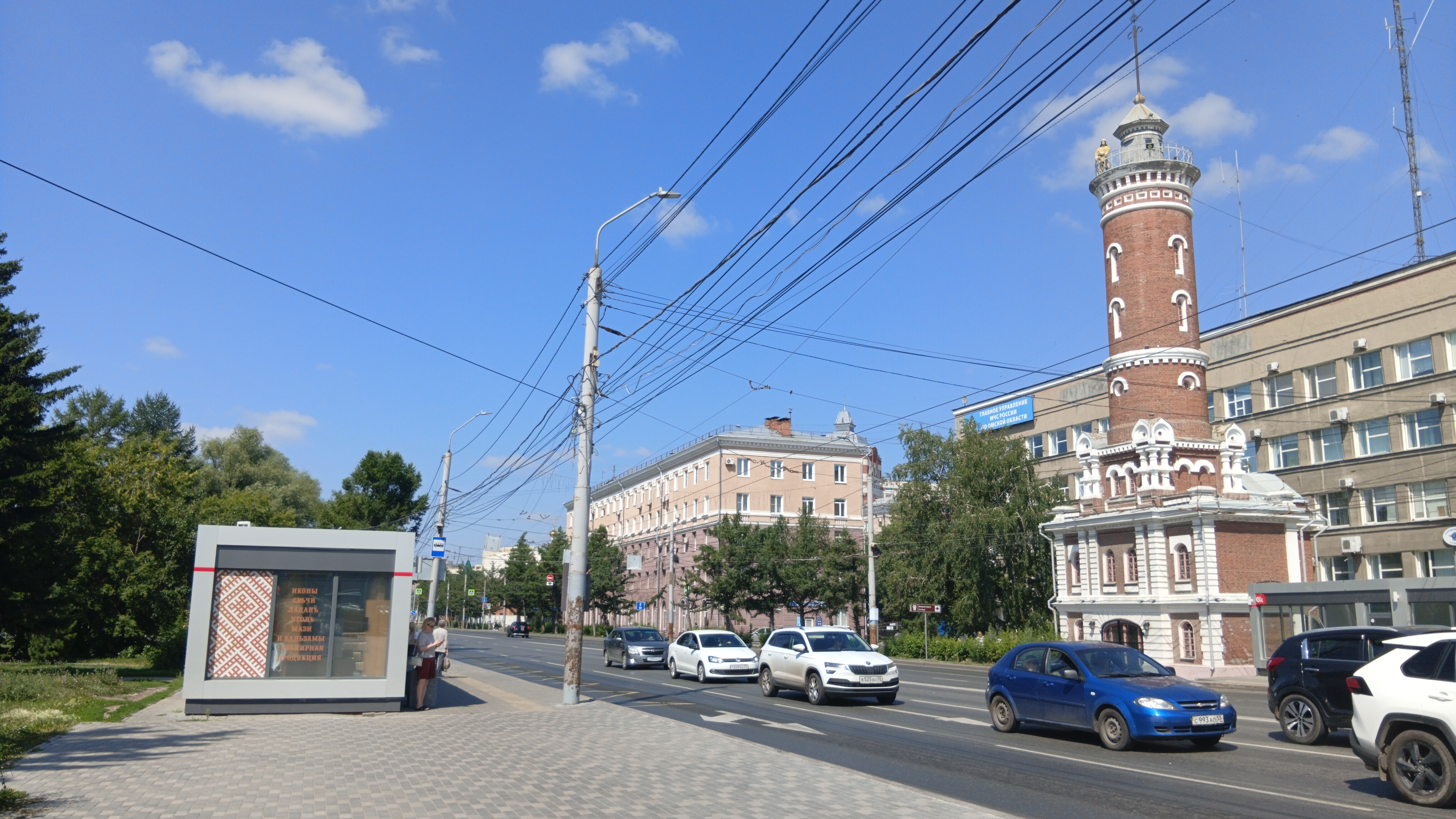
One of the central streets in Omsk

During the imperial era, Omsk was the seat of the governor general of Western Siberia and, later, of the governor general of the Steppes. For a brief period during the Russian Civil War in 1918–1920, it served as the capital of the anti-Bolshevik Russian State and held the imperial gold reserves.

Omsk serves as the episcopal see of the bishop of Omsk and Tara, as well as the administrative seat of the Imam of Siberia. The mayor is Sergey Shelest.

== Etymology ==
The city of Omsk is named after the Om river. This hydronym in the dialect of Baraba Tatars means "the quiet one".

== History ==
Timeline of Omsk
Historical affiliations

Tsardom of Russia, 1716–1721
Russian Empire, 1721–1917
Russian Republic, 1917–1918
Provisional All-Russian Government, 1918–1919
Soviet Union (RSFSR), 1919–1991
Russia, 1991–present

=== Imperial period ===
The creation of the Omsk fortress, like other Upper Irtysh fortresses, was caused by the urgent need to strengthen the trade route to China. The credit for their arrangement belongs entirely to the Siberian governor, Prince M.P. Gagarin. However, he also bears a large share of the responsibility. Gagarin, being the governor in Nerchinsk and then the head of the Siberian order and the Siberian province, devoted a lot of time and effort to trade with China. And above all, he organized the trade route to this country.

The main route passed from Tobolsk, down the Irtysh, then up the Ob, then along the Ket portage to the Yenisei, and on to the border with China. The journey was long, difficult, and expensive. There was also a second option - up the Irtysh, twice shorter and much easier. Kalmyk, Kyrgyz-Kaisak and Chinese chiefs were interested in this route as they all had their share of international trade. However, above the mouth of the Ob, trade caravans were attacked by free detachments of Kalmyks (Oirats) and Kirghiz-Kaisaks, which their rulers could not cope with. A reliable guard was needed with its placement in stationary fortifications.

In May 1714, the Siberian governor received the tsar's consent to build fortresses along the Irtysh and to the existing trade route. In his report to the tsar on May 22, 1714, Gagarin substantiated the need to build fortresses along the Irtysh to ensure communication and safety of the expedition going to the city of Yarkand for the golden sand.

The gold deposit was behind the Tien Shan ridges, on the territory of a neighboring state, in the Taklamakan Desert. Prince Gagarin understood the consequences of this adventure. With a positive result, this would threaten a military conflict with China and Dzungaria. Of course, the Siberian governor did not expect the military expedition to reach Yarkand. It was almost impossible and unnecessary. The fortresses along the trade route would remain. The tsar believed in the governor and signed a decree organizing an expedition under the command of a former captain of the Guards, Army Lieutenant Colonel Ivan Bukholts, about the construction of fortresses along the Irtysh above Yamyshev.

On January 2, 1716, Matvey Petrovich Gagarin took up his governor's duties and actively took up the construction of fortresses in Siberia including those on Lake Kosogol, and the Yenisei and Irtysh rivers. Between January 8–10, 1716, the prince met with the king and made him an offer as a golden collection from the ancient burial mounds plundered along the Ishim and Irtysh.

At the meeting, Gagarin reported to Peter about his plans for the development of Siberia and received the tsar's permission, presumably as the highest resolution. On January 27, 1716, Peter I left for Europe, where he stayed until October 1717 and ceased receiving timely and reliable information from Siberia. In January 1716, Gagarin (regarding the tsar's decree) issued his own orders for the construction of a fortress on the frontier of Kosogol Lake and in April on the construction of the fortresses on the Upper Yenisei.

On April 28, the Buholz detachment abandoned the Yamyshev fortress and moved down the Irtysh to the territory of the Tarsky district. Gagarin assessed the situation and gave instructions to Lieutenant Colonel Buholz and the Tara commandant to build a fortress at the mouth of the Om and sent recruits to reinforce them. By the end of 1716, the first fortress (fortified place) was built in the modern river station. It comprised an earthen pentagonal fortress, powder and food stores, barracks for soldiers, and houses for officers.

The first Omsk fortress (fortified place) was practically a copy of the fortress erected in 1715 near Yamyshevskoye Lake. However, it also had a significant drawback: the fortifications were scattered and the outer fence was weak. When the enemy attacked, the entire garrison would have to defend the fortress with objects separate from each other. This actually happened in 1716 during the defense of the Yamyshevskaya fortress. The unsuccessful layout of the first Yamyshev and Omsk fortresses was explained by the lack of fortification experience among the construction managers.

At the beginning of 1717, the dragoon captain, Ilya Gavrilovich Aksakov, was requested to make the trip from Russia. The Governor conferred a major on him and directed him to supervise the construction of a new (second) fortress at the mouth of the Om. In the summer of 1717, the Omsk garrison under the command of Stupin went to the upper Irtysh to build fortresses. Lieutenant Colonel Ivan Buholz categorically refused to lead a new expedition. In March 1717, he was sent from Tobolsk to the capital. There is very little information about the foundation of the Omsk settlement and the construction of the second fortress. One of the most valuable sources of information is the inventory of documents of the Tara Chancellery, copied for Professor G.F. Miller in 1734. This inventory was mentioned by Professor V.I. Kochedamov in 1960, and in 2015 it was published by the Barnaul scientists V.B. Borodaev and A.V. Kontev. However, there are no drawings and it is not known where and how the new city (fortress) was built. From Tara to the Omsk fortress, a drawing was sent "On the structure of the Omsk fortress beyond the Omya river prison and courtyards in a line."

In 1722, this drawing was used by the captain-engineer, Paul de Grange, in the plan's development of the fortress on the right bank of the Om. At the end of the summer of 1717, Gagarin ordered the production of six bells for the Yamyshevskaya and Omsk fortresses. Bells were made by the military department, in the amount of three pieces per fortress. According to the drawing of the Omsk fortress in 1717, there was a triangular guard redoubt at the mouth of the Om, a quadrangular fort at the crossing over the Om, and a pentagonal fortress in the yard. At the beginning of 1718, seven bells were made. Perhaps the seventh was intended for the Omsk Sloboda on the right bank of the Om. There is no information about whether the quadrangular fort and the triangular redoubt were built. However, it is known that the fortress (defensive structure) was built pentagonal, although not as regular as in the drawing. This is clear from the plans of 1745 and 1755. The entire settlement (Omsk fortress, including the Cossack settlement and the main defensive structure) had the shape of an irregular, broken quadrangle.

In 1768 Om fortress was moved. The original Tobolsk and the restored Tara gates, along with the original German Lutheran Church and several public buildings, are left. Omsk was granted town status in 1782.

In 1822, Omsk became an administrative capital of Western Siberia and later in 1882 the center of the vast Steppes region (today the northern part of Kazakhstan) and Akmolinsk Oblast acquiring several churches and cathedrals of various denominations, mosques, a synagogue, the governor-general's mansion, and a military academy. But as the frontier receded and its military importance diminished, the town fell into disarray. For that reason, Omsk became a major center of the Siberian exile. From 1850 to 1854, Fyodor Dostoyevsky served his sentence in an Omsk katorga prison.

Inside the Omsk settlement (the city of Omsk), a military settlement - the Omsk fortress - lived on its own for approximately 150 years. By 1845, the structures of the Omsk fortress were half destroyed, which prompted the engineering department of the military department to petition for the abolition of the fortress. In 1864, the fortress was destroyed.

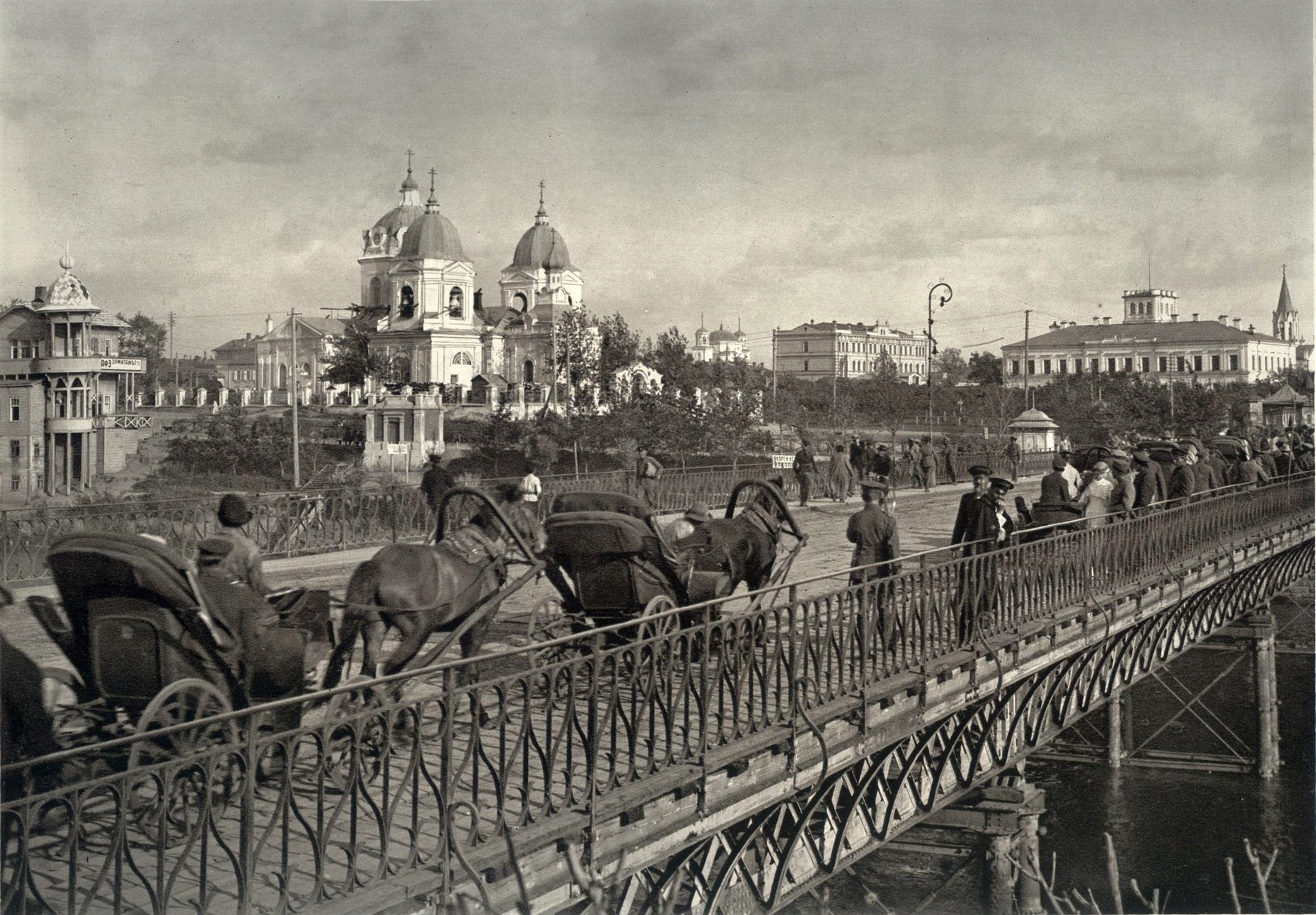
The Iron Bridge in 1918

The development of the city was generated by the construction of the Trans-Siberian Railway in the 1890s. This move led to the significance of Omsk as a logistic hub. Many trade companies established stores and offices in Omsk which came to define the character of the city center. British, Dutch, and German consulates were established roughly at the same time to represent their commercial interests. The pinnacle of development for pre-revolutionary Omsk was the Siberian Exposition of Agriculture and Industry in 1910. The popularity of the World Fair contributed to the image of Omsk as the "Chicago of Siberia."

After the October Revolution, anti-Bolshevik White forces seized control of Omsk. The "Provisional All-Russian Government" was established in Omsk in 1918, headed by the Arctic explorer and decorated war hero Admiral Kolchak. Omsk was proclaimed the capital of Russia, and its central bank was tasked with safekeeping the former empire's gold reserves. These were guarded by a garrison of former Czechoslovak POWs trapped in Siberia by the chaos of World War I and the subsequent Revolution. Omsk became a prime target for the Red Army, which viewed it as a major focus of their Siberian campaign and eventually forced Kolchak and his government to abandon the city and retreat along the Trans-Siberian eastward to Irkutsk. Bolshevik forces entered the city in 1919.

=== Soviet period ===
The Soviet government preferred the young Novonikolayevsk (later known as Novosibirsk) as the administrative center of Western Siberia, prompting the mass transfer of administrative, cultural, and educational functions from Omsk to Novonikolayevsk. This directive stunted Omsk's growth and sparked a continuing rivalry between the two cities. Omsk received a new life because of World War II. Because it was both far from the fighting and had a well-developed infrastructure, Omsk provided a perfect haven for much of the industry evacuated away from the frontlines. Contingency plans were made to transfer the provisional Soviet capital to Omsk in the event of a German victory during the Battle of Moscow (October 1941 to January 1942). At the end of the war, Omsk remained a major industrial center, subsequently becoming a leader in Soviet military production.

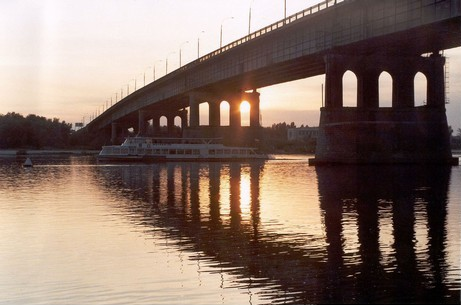
Leningrad bridge over the Irtysh

Military industries that moved to Omsk included part of the OKMO tank-design bureau in 1941, and S.M. Kirov Factory no. 185 from Chelyabinsk, in 1962. The Kirov Factory and Omsk Transmash design bureau (KBTM) produced T-80 tanks from the 1970s, and handled the BTR-T, TOS-1, and the prototype Black Eagle tank. Omsk Transmash declared bankruptcy in 2002.

In the 1950s, following the development of the oil and natural gas field in Siberia, an oil refinery complex was built, along with an entire "town of oil workers", expanding Omsk northward along the Irtysh. It is currently the largest such complex in Russia. Gazprom Neft, the parent company, is the largest employer in the city, wielding its tax rates as leverage in negotiations with municipal and regional authorities. The nearby parts of the city close to the complex were nicknamed Neftezovodskaya by refinery workers.

Omsk-Severnyy (air base), a Soviet then Russian Air Force base, is located nearby.

=== Post-Soviet period ===
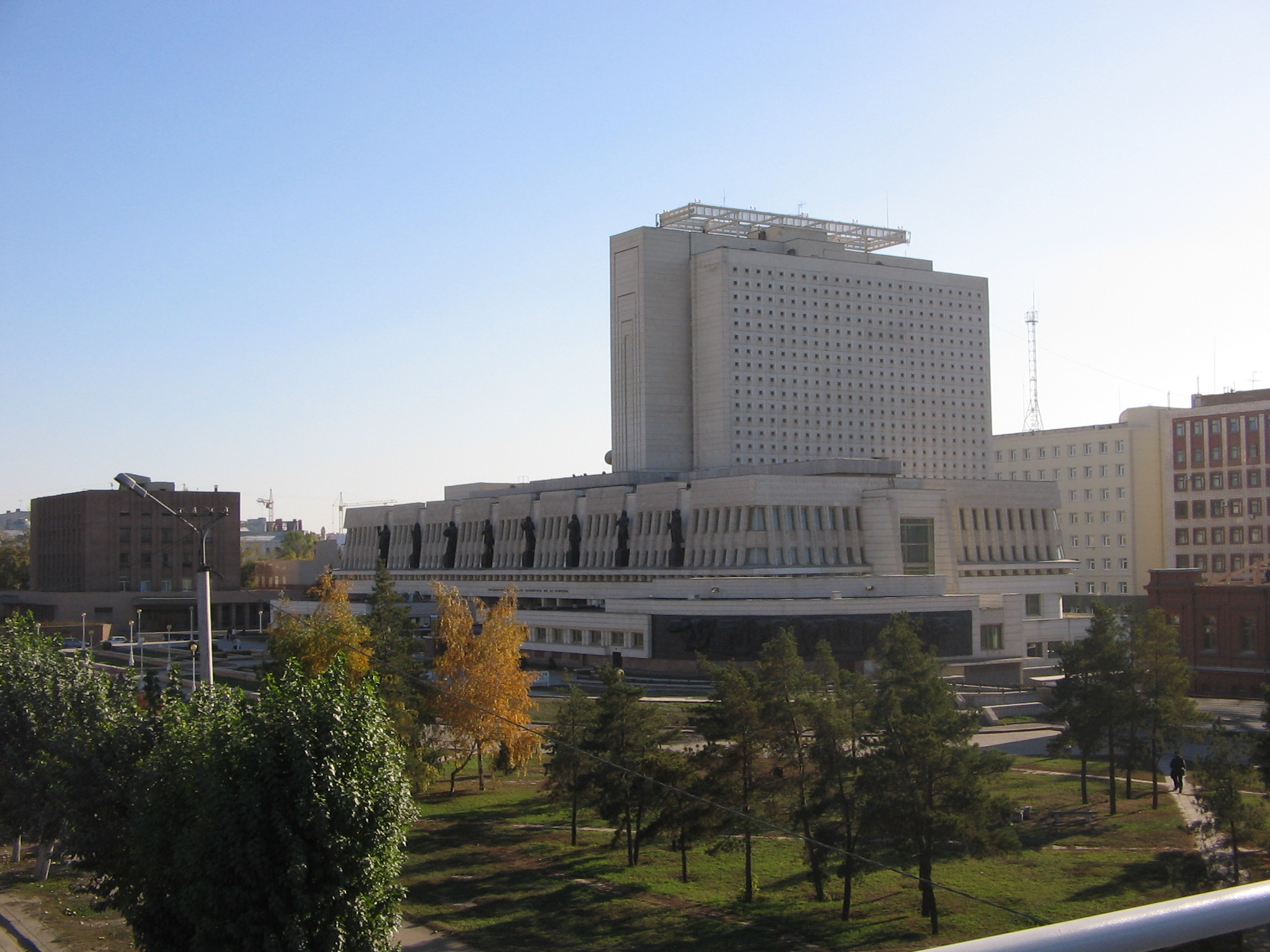
Omsk State Library

Following the dissolution of the Soviet Union, Omsk experienced a period of economic instability and political stagnation. Most of the city's large businesses, which had been state-owned, were fought over by members of the former party elite, the emerging nouveau riche, and fast-growing criminal syndicates. The most notorious cases involved the privatization of Sibneft, a major oil company. Until the end of the 1990s, political life in Omsk was defined by an ongoing feud between the oblast and city authorities. The resulting conflict developed into two points of view, which served as the impetus for some improvements to the city's infrastructure and cultural life. These improvements included the construction of new leisure parks and the renovation of the city's historic center, the establishment of the annual Siberian International Marathon, and of the annual City Days Festival. Despite this, internal political competition continued to drain the city's resources and served as a major obstacle to smooth government operations and city development.

From 1941 onwards prisoners who died in the prisons of Omsk were buried in the Staro-Severnoe cemetery. After 1944 forced settlers, including deported Kalmyks, were buried in other parts of the cemetery. On 24 May 2002 with the agreement of the city administration a memorial was erected in the cemetery to deported Kalmyks who died in the Omsk Region.

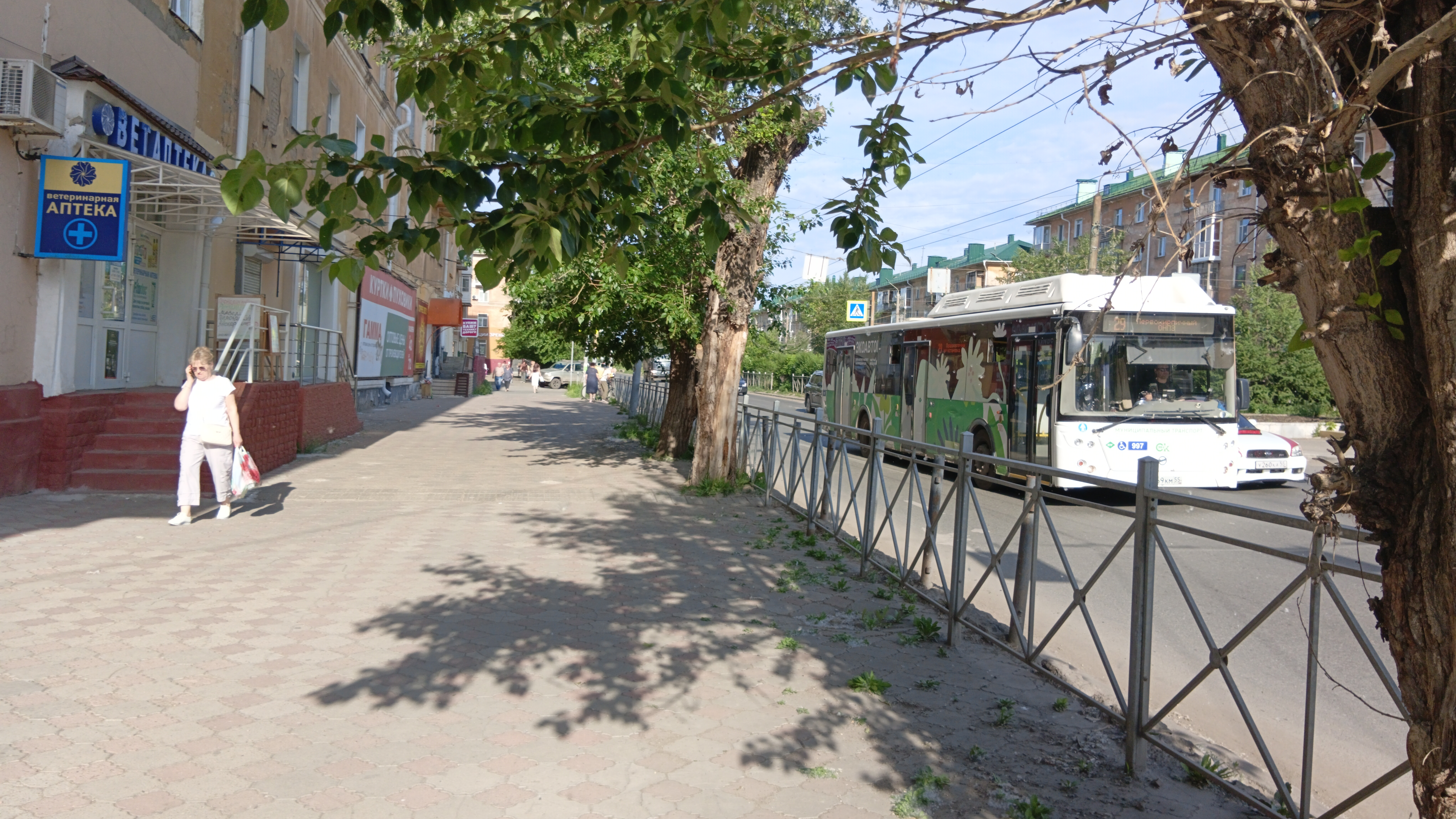
Omsk in modern days

== Geography ==
=== Location ===
Omsk is in the south of the West Siberian Plain, along the banks of the north-flowing Irtysh, at its confluence with the Om River. The city has an elevation of 87 meters (285 ft) above mean sea level at its highest point.

Omsk is an important railroad hub and is the junction point for the northern and southern branches of the Trans-Siberian Railway. The city also serves as a major hub for the regional highway network. River-port facilities handle both passengers and freight, giving the city access to navigating the extensive waterways of the Irtysh and Ob River. The waterways connect Omsk with the coal and mineral-mining towns further up the river in Kazakhstan, as well as with the oil, natural gas and lumber operations of northern Siberia. Omsk is served by the Tsentralny Airport, which offers access to domestic and international (primarily, German and Kazakh) destinations, making the city an important aviation hub for Siberia and the Russian Far East.

It is about 450 km (280 mi) north of Kazakhstan's capital Astana, and 600 km (370 mi) west of Siberia's largest city, Novosibirsk, and 2,230 km (1,390 mi) east of Russia's capital and largest city, Moscow.

=== Climate ===
Omsk has a humid continental climate (Köppen Dfb) characterized by dramatic seasonal shifts in weather: winters are long, dry, windy and very cold, and summers are short but sunny and warm, sometimes hot. Average daily temperatures, taken over the past three decades, are between +20 °C (68 °F) for July and −17 °C (1.4 °F) for January, although temperatures can reach +40 °C (104 °F) in the summer and drop to −45 °C (−49 °F) in the winter. On average, Omsk sees over 300 sunny days a year (2201 hours). The average annual precipitation is 415 millimeters (16.3 in).

Climate data for Omsk (1991–2020, extremes 1875–present)
Month	Jan	Feb	Mar	Apr	May	Jun	Jul	Aug	Sep	Oct	Nov	Dec	Year
Record high °C (°F)	4.2 (39.6)	8.0 (46.4)	14.1 (57.4)	31.3 (88.3)	35.6 (96.1)	40.1 (104.2)	40.4 (104.7)	38.0 (100.4)	32.9 (91.2)	27.4 (81.3)	16.1 (61.0)	4.5 (40.1)	40.4 (104.7)
Mean daily maximum °C (°F)	−12.7 (9.1)	−9.9 (14.2)	−2.0 (28.4)	10.1 (50.2)	19.5 (67.1)	23.8 (74.8)	24.9 (76.8)	22.8 (73.0)	16.1 (61.0)	8.3 (46.9)	−3.4 (25.9)	−10 (14)	7.3 (45.1)
Daily mean °C (°F)	−16.9 (1.6)	−14.6 (5.7)	−6.6 (20.1)	4.7 (40.5)	13.0 (55.4)	18.0 (64.4)	19.4 (66.9)	17.0 (62.6)	10.6 (51.1)	3.8 (38.8)	−6.9 (19.6)	−13.9 (7.0)	2.3 (36.1)
Mean daily minimum °C (°F)	−21 (−6)	−19 (−2)	−11.2 (11.8)	−0.2 (31.6)	6.6 (43.9)	12.1 (53.8)	14.0 (57.2)	11.7 (53.1)	5.7 (42.3)	−0.1 (31.8)	−10 (14)	−17.8 (0.0)	−2.4 (27.7)
Record low °C (°F)	−45.1 (−49.2)	−45.5 (−49.9)	−41.1 (−42.0)	−26.4 (−15.5)	−12.9 (8.8)	−3.1 (26.4)	2.1 (35.8)	−1.7 (28.9)	−7.6 (18.3)	−28.1 (−18.6)	−41.2 (−42.2)	−44.7 (−48.5)	−45.5 (−49.9)
Average precipitation mm (inches)	21 (0.8)	18 (0.7)	19 (0.7)	26 (1.0)	31 (1.2)	55 (2.2)	65 (2.6)	56 (2.2)	30 (1.2)	33 (1.3)	35 (1.4)	29 (1.1)	418 (16.5)
Average extreme snow depth cm (inches)	33 (13)	41 (16)	39 (15)	5 (2.0)	0 (0)	0 (0)	0 (0)	0 (0)	0 (0)	1 (0.4)	8 (3.1)	22 (8.7)	41 (16)
Average rainy days	1	0.4	3	10	17	17	18	19	18	13	5	1	122
Average snowy days	28	25	18	9	2	0.2	0	0	1	11	22	28	144
Average relative humidity (%)	80	78	75	63	52	61	68	70	70	73	81	82	71
Mean monthly sunshine hours	83.9	129.6	200.6	237.5	306.9	317.1	297.0	257.1	177.7	121.1	71.8	54.8	2,255.1
Source 1: Pogoda.ru.net
Source 2: NOAA

== Demographics ==
Historical population
Year	Pop.	±%
1897	37,400	—
1926	157,906	+322.2%
1939	288,855	+82.9%
1959	581,108	+101.2%
1970	821,151	+41.3%
1979	1,014,246	+23.5%
1989	1,148,418	+13.2%
2002	1,134,016	−1.3%
2010	1,154,116	+1.8%
2021	1,125,695	−2.5%
Source: Census data

The population in Omsk had been steadily rising, according to the records: from 31,000 in 1881 to 53,050 in 1900 and to 1,148,418 in 1989. The 2002 Census recorded that the population had declined to 1,134,016, but it rebounded marginally, according to the 2010 Census, which listed the population of 1,154,116. By 2021, the population had declined to 1,125,695.

As of the 2021 Census, the ethnic composition of Omsk was:

Ethnic group	Population	Percentage
Russians	876,392	90.8%
Kazakhs	35,794	3.7%
Tatars	12,422	1.3%
Ukrainians	7,417	0.8%
Germans	7,078	0.7%
Other	26,590	2.8%

== Architecture ==
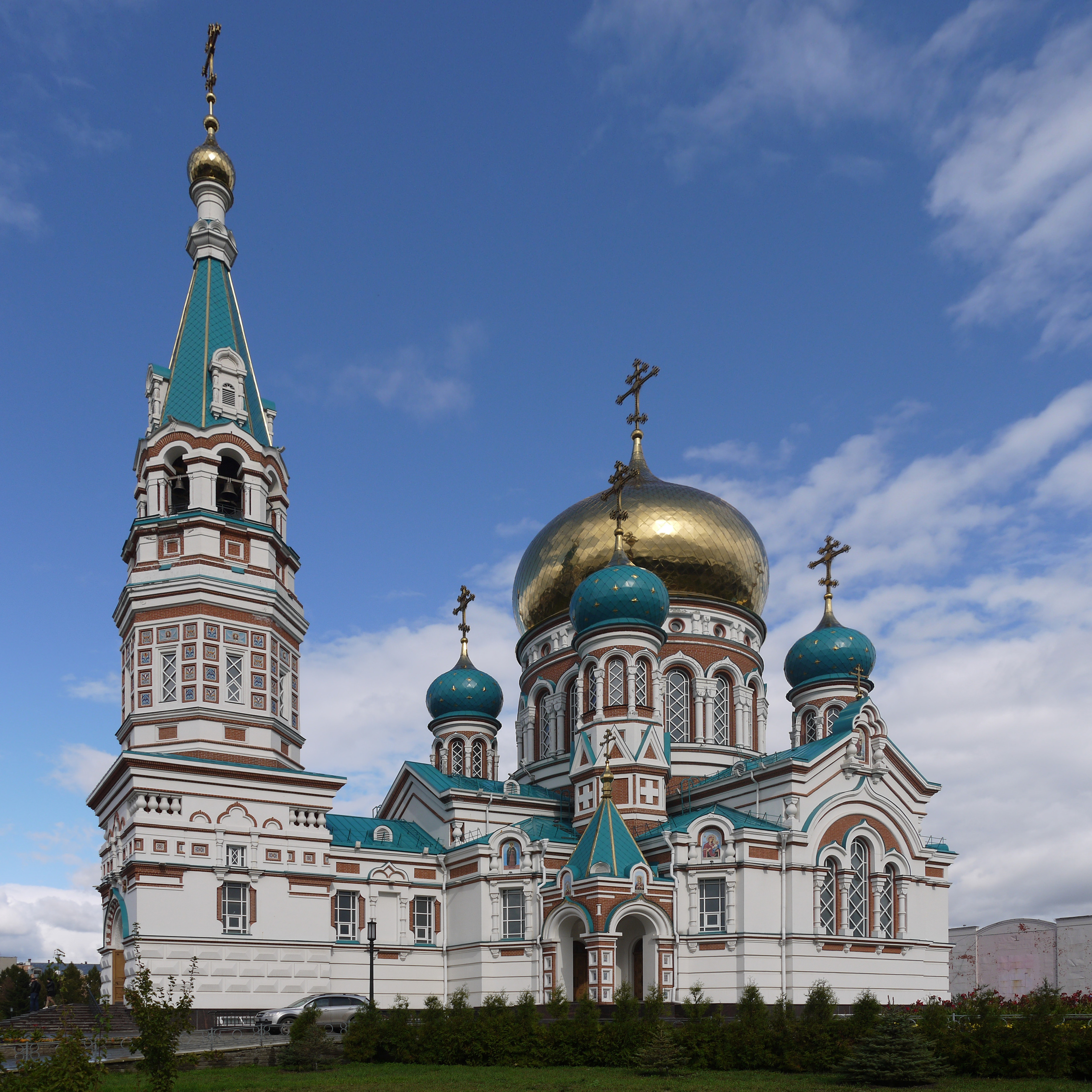
Omsk Dormition Cathedral

The architectural centerpiece of the city is an ensemble of buildings along Lyubinsky Avenue/Lenina Street, anchored by the former Gostiny Dvor, and flanked by two chapels. The area is an eclectic mix of architectural styles, dominated by Art nouveau, Neoclassical and Second Empire.

Closer to the confluence of the Om and the Irtysh are the few surviving sombre buildings of the 18th-century fortress. The largest and most opulent church in the city is the Dormition Cathedral, a five-domed edifice in the Russian Revival style, consecrated in 1896, demolished by the Soviets, and restored in the first decade of the 21st century.

Another area of interest is Nikolsky Avenue-Krasnykh Zor Street, where a line of merchants' wooden houses still stands. The street leads to the Neoclassical cathedral of St. Nicholas, which was commissioned by the Cossacks, designed by Vasily Stasov and consecrated in 1840. It contains various relics of the Siberian Cossacks.

Also, an important sigh-seen of the city is the Achair Women's Monastery in the name of the Life-giving Cross of the Lord. It is known for a mineral spring (+37 degrees) on its territory alleged to have healing properties, which was consecrated on September 14, 1993, by Patriarch Alexy II of Moscow.

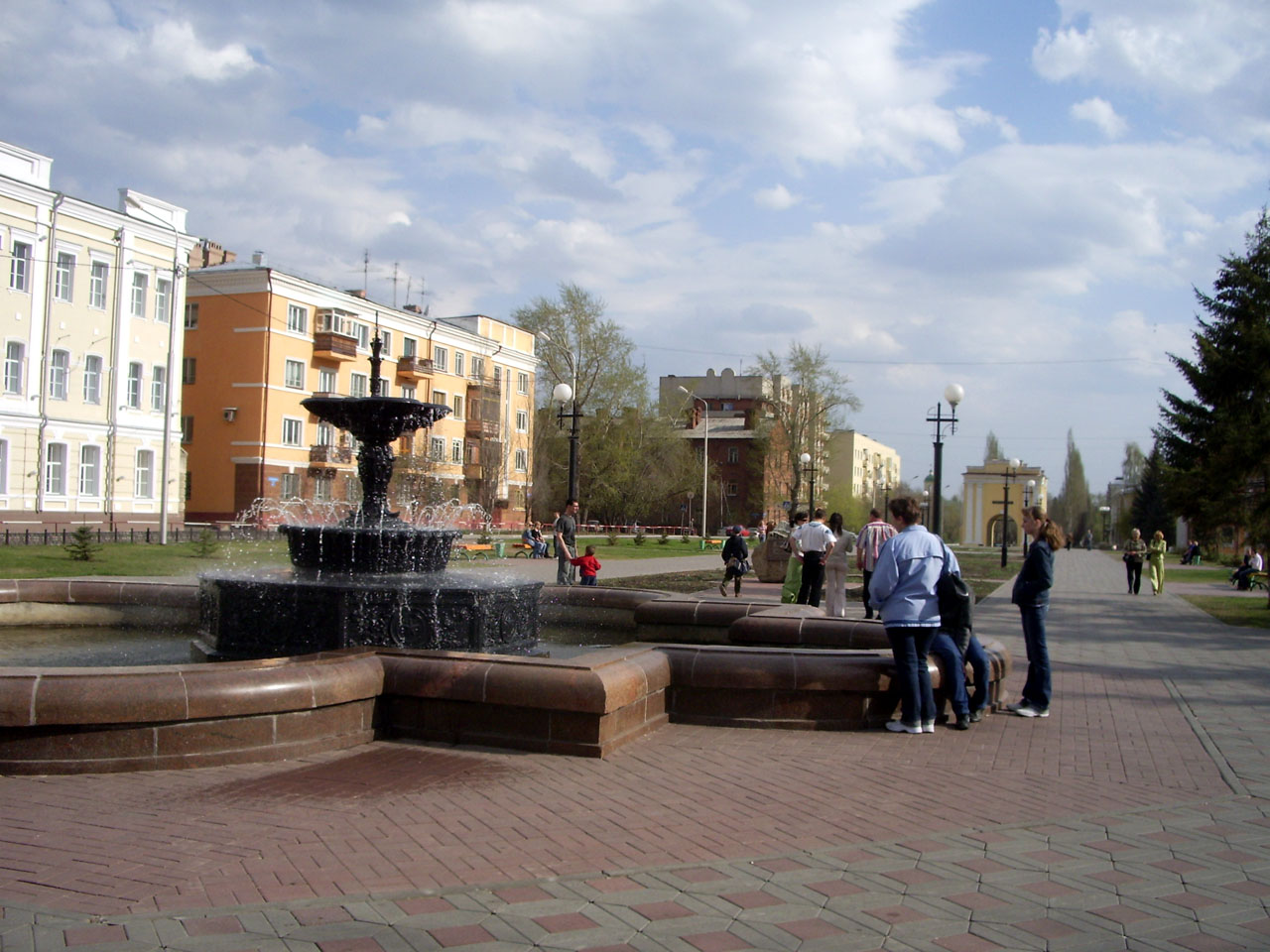
Tarskaya Street

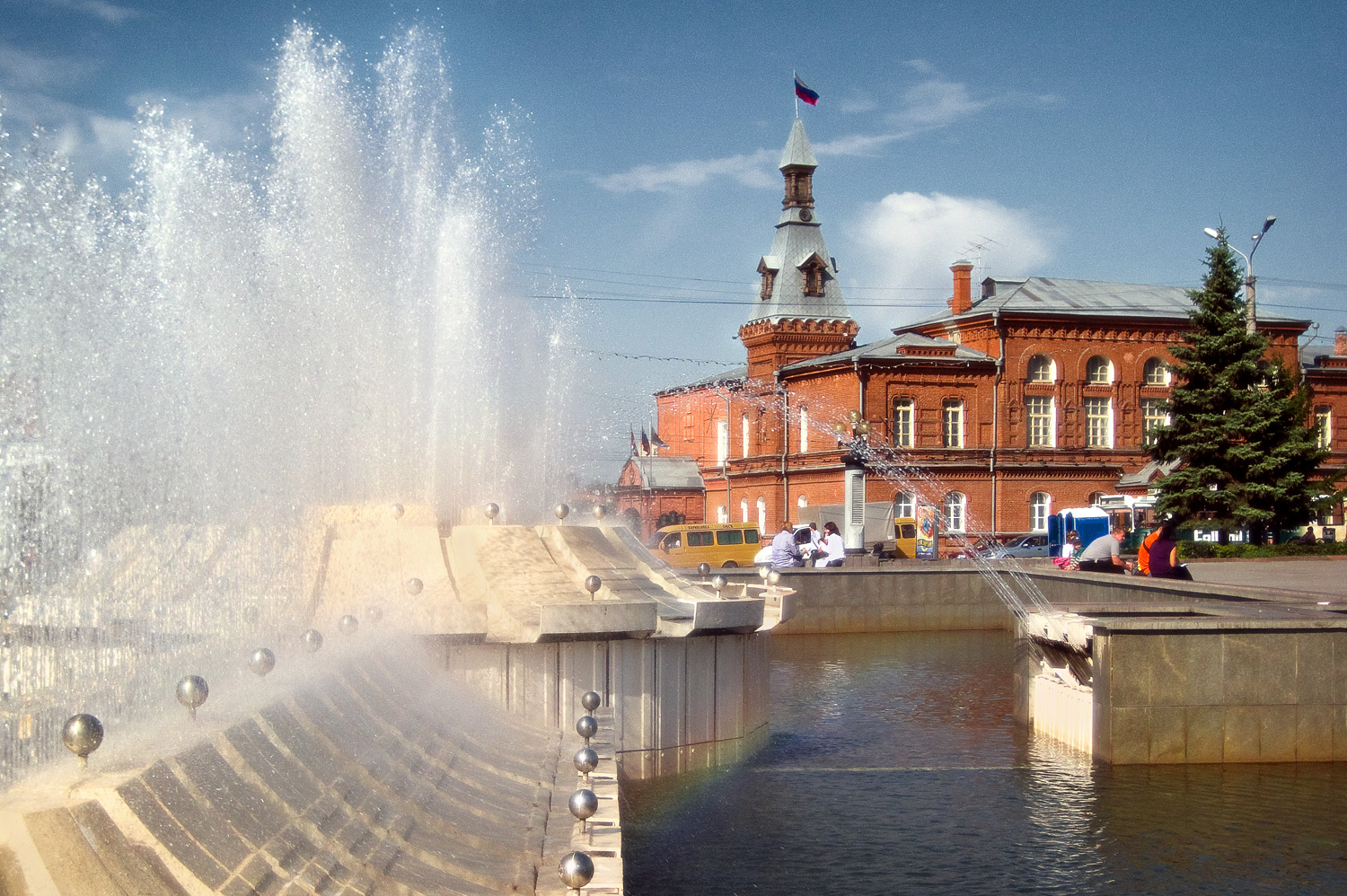
The fountain on Teatralnaya Ploshad'

== Education ==
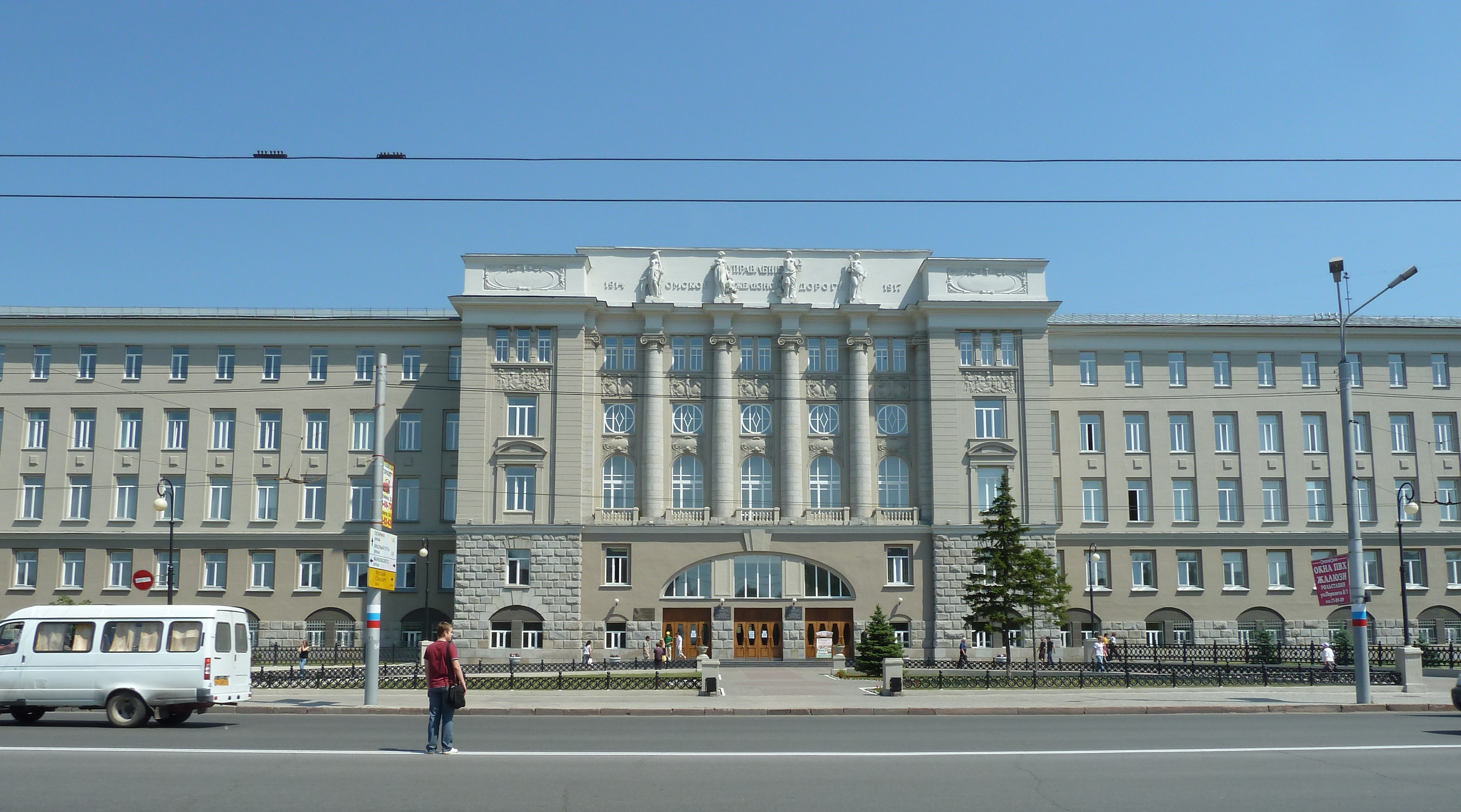
Omsk State Transport University

Omsk is home to many institutions of higher learning and several universities:

- Law and Economics Institute
- Omsk Academy of Law
- Omsk Academy of MVD Rossija
- Omsk Aviation Technical School
- Omsk Foreign Language Institute
- Omsk State Medical University
- Omsk State Transport University (1961)
- Omsk State Agrarian University (1918) (connected with Omsk State Veterinary Institute and Institute of Agribusiness and Continuing Education)
- Omsk State Pedagogical University
- Omsk State University (1974)
- Omsk Institute of Consumer Service Technology
- Omsk State Technical University (1942)
- SibADI - (Russian: Сибирский АвтоДорожный Институт) Siberian State Automobile and Highway Academy (formerly, Institute)
- SibGUFK - (Russian: Сибирский Государственный Университет Физической Культуры) Siberian Academy of Physical Culture
- Siberian Institute of Business and Information Technology
- Sovremennyi Gomunitarnyi University
- SIBNFOR - Siberian Stock Market Institute

== Culture ==
As a prominent educational center, Omsk has several museums, theaters, music venues, and educational institutions.

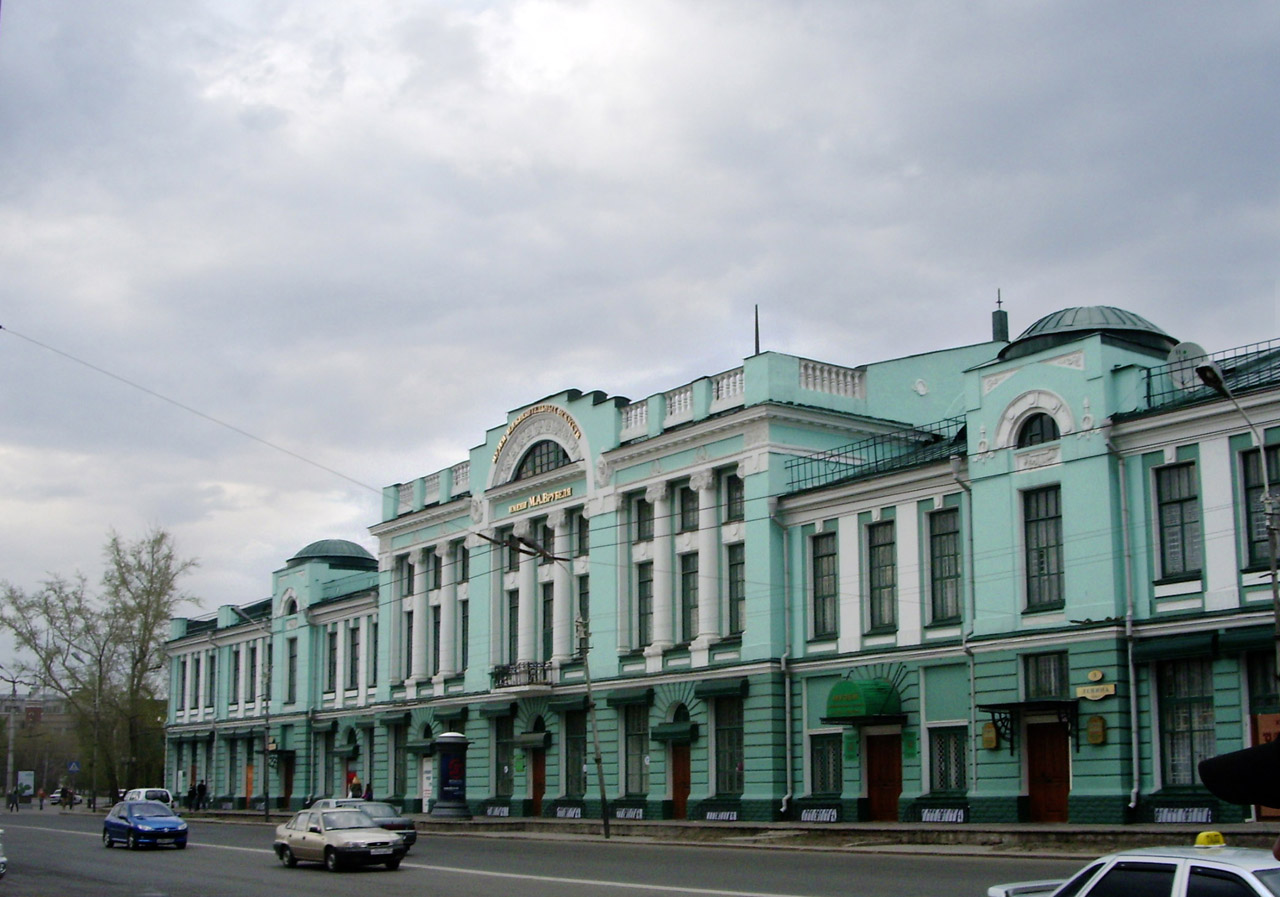
Omsk Vrubel Museum

Among Omsk's museums, the most notable are:

- The State Museum of Regional History
- The Dostoyevsky Museum of Literature
- The Vrubel Museum of Fine Arts
- The Military Museum Complex
- The Kondraty Belov Art Museum
- The Liberov Center for Art

Theaters include the Omsk Opera, The Omsk Theater of Drama, The Omsk Circus, the Omsk State Music Theater, and several smaller venues.

=== Sports ===
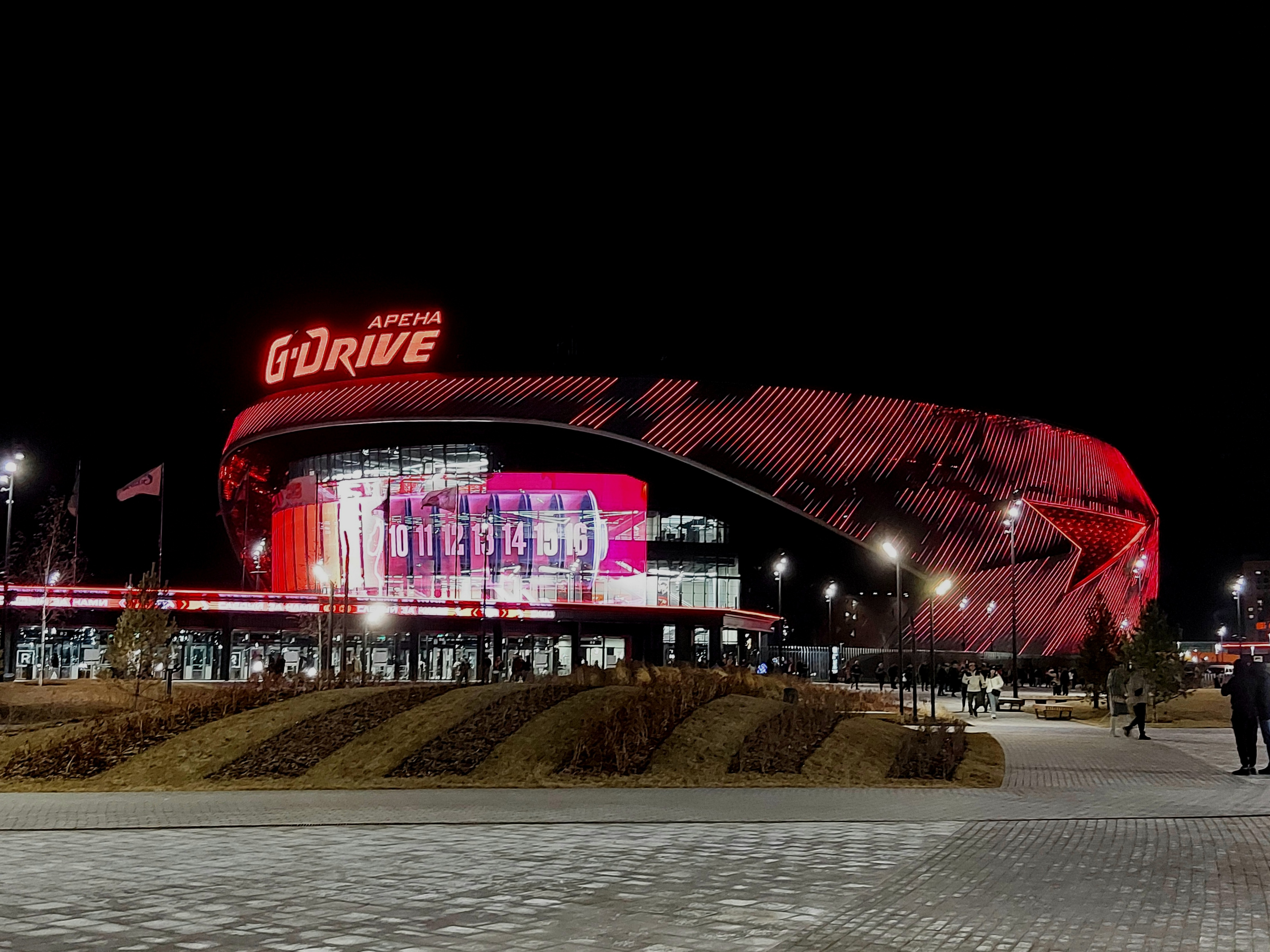
G-Drive Arena

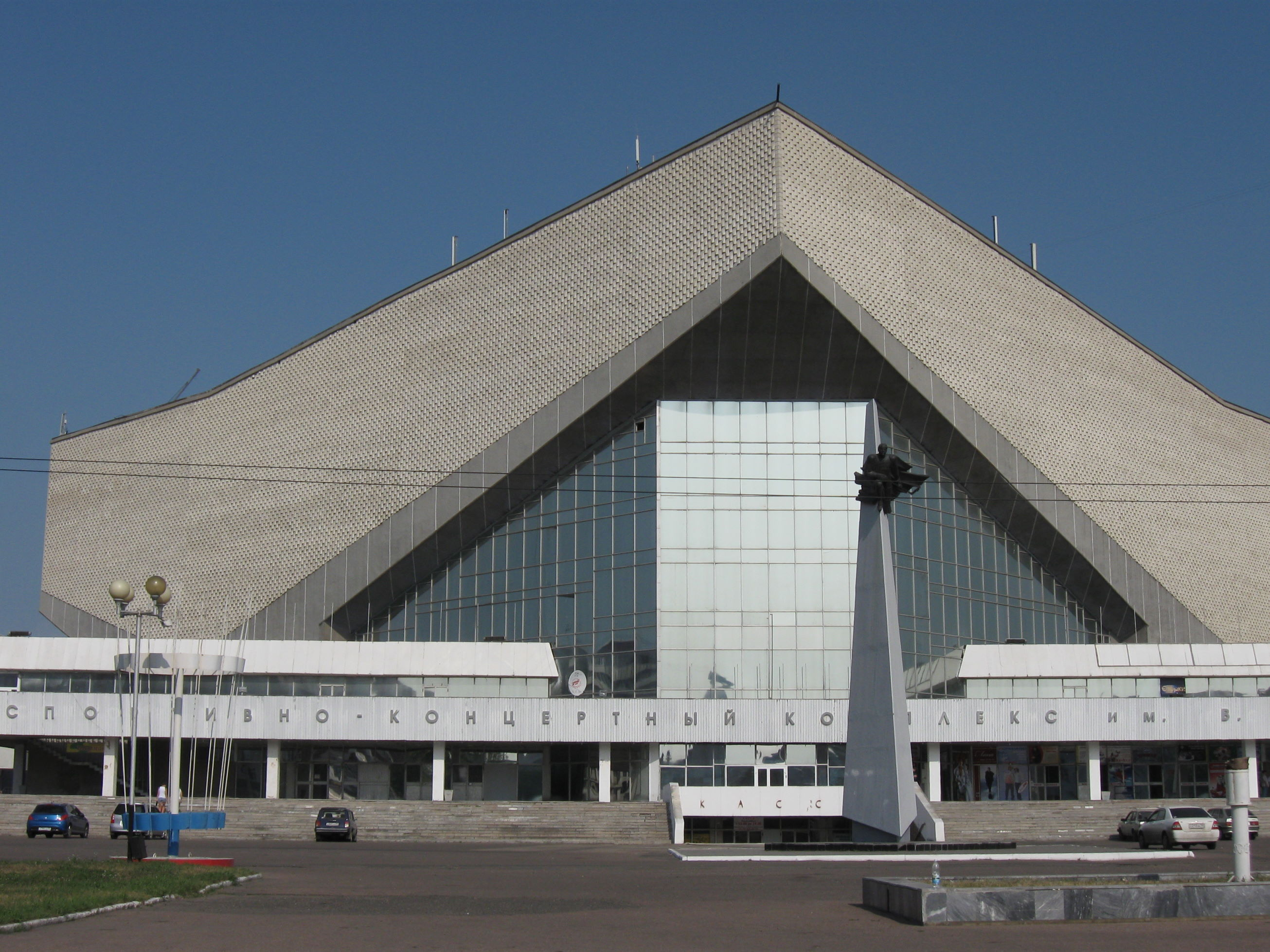
Blinov Sports and Concerts Complex

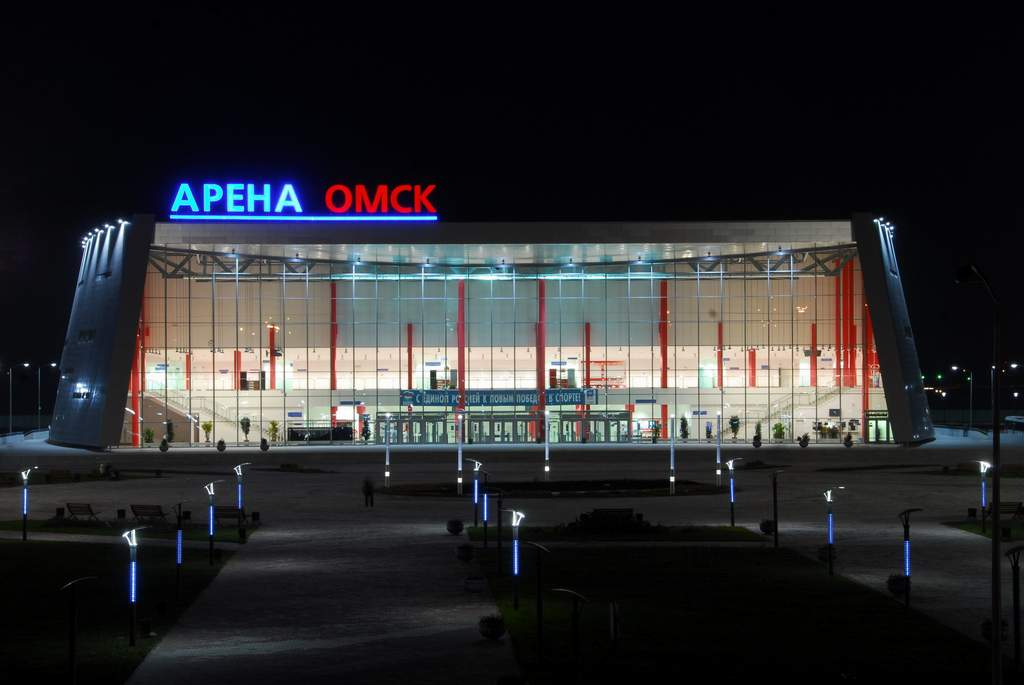
Arena Omsk (Demolished in 2019)

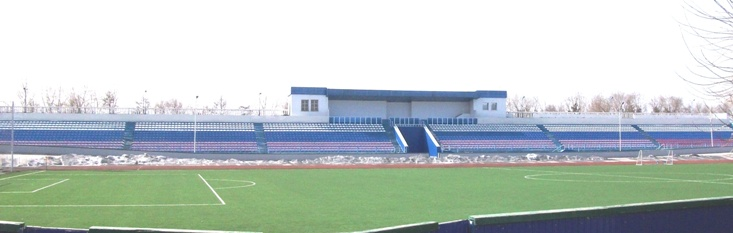
Dinamo stadium

Omsk is represented nationally by professional association football and hockey clubs.

Club	Sport	Founded	Current league	League rank	Stadium
Avangard Omsk	Ice Hockey	1950	Kontinental Hockey League	1st	G-Drive Arena
Omsk Hawks	Ice Hockey	2009	MHL		Hockey Academy Avangard
Omskie Yastreby	Ice Hockey	2009	Minor Hockey League	Jr. 1st	G-Drive Arena
Yastreby Omsk	Ice Hockey	2012	Minor Hockey League Division B	Jr. 2nd	G-Drive Arena
Omichka Omsk	Volleyball	1965	Woman's Volleyball Super League	1st	Blinov SCC
Omichka-2	Volleyball	2009	Woman's Supreme League	2nd	SC Ermak
Irtysh Omsk	Football	1946	Russian Second Division	2nd	Red Star Stadium
Neftyanik Omsk	Basketball	1965	Basketball Superleague B	3rd	Sports Complex Sibirskiy Neftyanik

== Politics ==
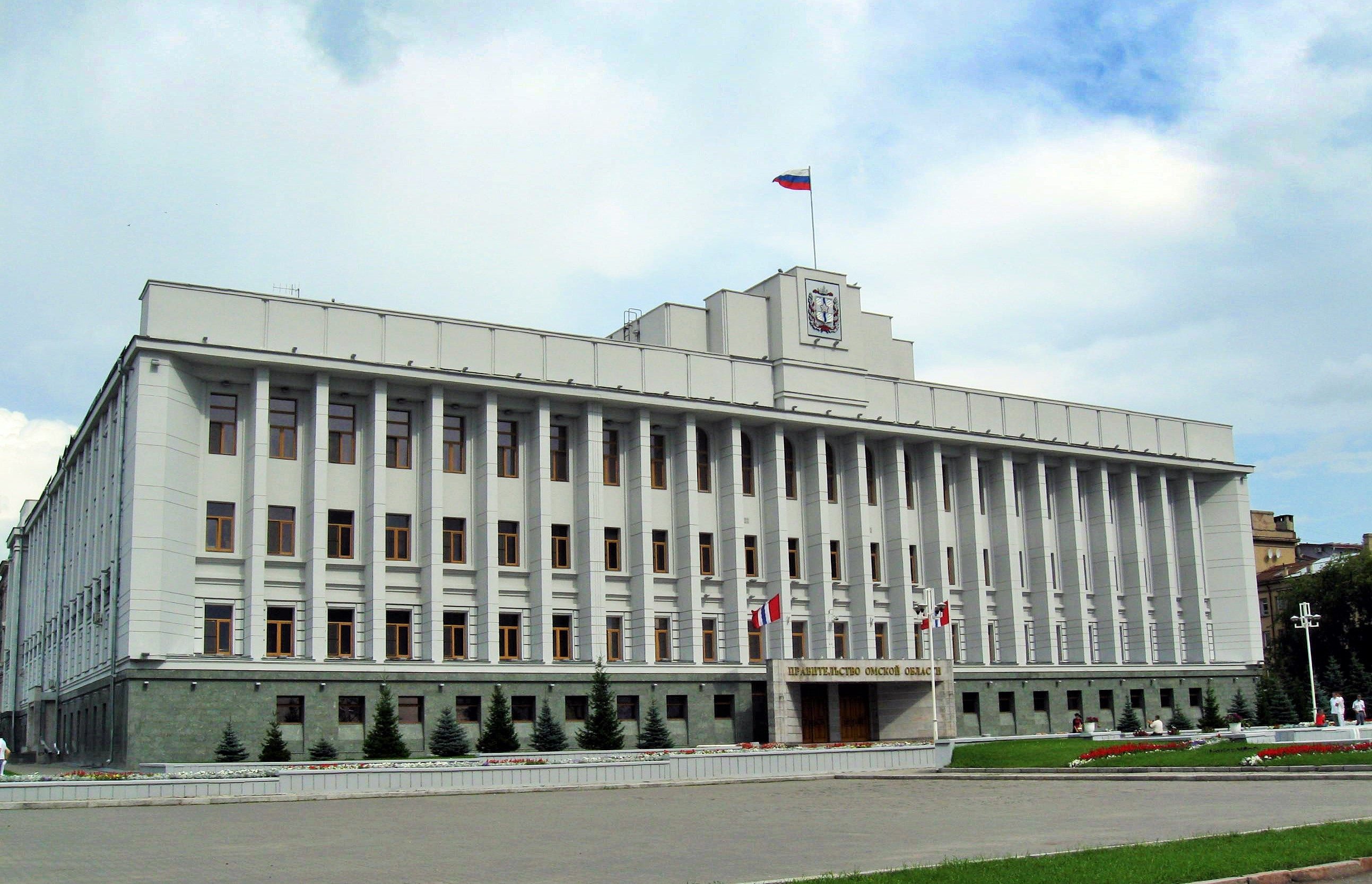
The building of the Government of the Omsk Oblast

The socio-political life of Omsk has long been known for the conflict between the city and regional authorities.

For more than ten years, there was an information war between Governor Leonid Polezhayev of the Omsk Oblast and the city's mayors. It began with a confrontation between Polezhayev and Valery Roshchupkin (1995–2001) in 1999 and was accompanied by black PR from the media owned by the governor (for example, Channel 12) and from the media owned or supported by the mayor. The heads of several newspapers and one television company issued a joint statement accusing the governor of violating the "media law" and the Constitution, which guarantees freedom of speech. Then, in 2003, the conflict between the governor and the mayor Yevgeny Belov (2001–2004) began, culminating in the change of the mayor. The new mayor Viktor Schrader (2004–2012) initially came with the governor's full support; however, in 2010, the information war unfolded again. Several pro-governor media sought the resignation of the mayor. At a press conference on 1 December 2010, Viktor Schreider said he did not intend to participate. According to another version, the information war began in November 2009 after the primaries of the Omsk branch of the United Russia party, but the prerequisites were still in the summer of 2009; as a result, the entire information war was reduced to a political game. Schreider, as a result, changed the post of mayor to the place of a deputy in the State Duma, and the acting mayor T. A. Vizhevitova was appointed in his place.

In 2012, the Omsk Oblast Governor Polezhayev, permanent since the Soviet era, resigned, and Viktor Nazarov, who previously held the post of general director at CJSC Gazprom Mezhregiongaz Omsk, was appointed in his place. In the same year, early mayoral elections (due to the resignation of the previous mayor) were held, and United Russia candidate Vyacheslav Dvorakovsky, who previously served as chief engineer of the Omsk NPO Mostovik, was elected the new mayor. The information war continued, with the next round beginning during a direct line with President Putin, when an Omsk woman complained that she could not get an appointment with the Omsk mayor, and Putin publicly called Dvorakovsky a "piglet". In March 2016, at an air show attended by more than 100,000 spectators, Nazarov ignored the mayor. BK55 correspondent Yelena Yarovaya noted that the mayor at this event was deprived of the right to speak:

It turns out like this: for bad roads, unremoved snow, and landfills, we "beat" the mayor with a poor budget. And we celebrate holidays, all sorts of shows and pleasures, without a representative of the municipal government elected by Omsk residents. Here are all the laurels and applause to the head of the region.

At […] the event, a trend was clearly outlined, a fashionable tone set by the former governor Leonid Polezhayev - the separation of the city and the region. Although, in poor budgets, Nazarov and Dvorakovsky, on the contrary, should have worked "in one bundle."

According to Vyacheslav Dvorakovsky, the information war is needed by people whose interests are to weaken both city and regional authorities, while both authorities have already successfully cooperated in solving the problem of kindergartens. On 30 April 2016, during a prank call from the NTV channel, the governor Nazarov sharply criticized Dvorakovsky for his inactivity concerning the city and unwillingness to accept help in critical communal tasks. At the same time, Nazarov stressed that normal interaction, without a "war", with the mayor does not work even with a mutual desire for this.

=== Administrative and municipal status ===
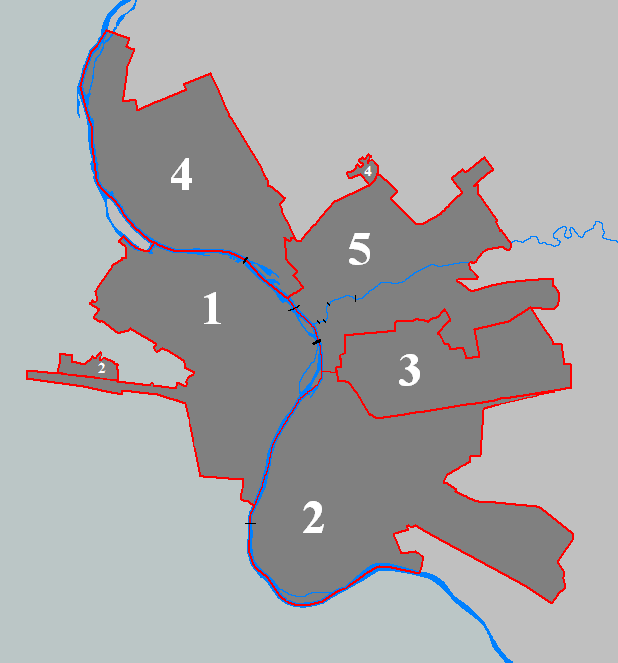
Administrative okrugs: 1. Kirovsky; 2. Leninsky; 3. Oktyabrsky; 4. Sovietsky; 5. Tsentraly

Within the framework of administrative divisions, Omsk is incorporated as a city of oblast significance—an administrative unit with the status equal to that of the districts. As a municipal division, Omsk is incorporated as the Omsk Urban Okrug.

=== Omsk City Council ===
The representative body of local self-government is the Omsk City Council, elected for five years and consisting of forty deputies. The acting City Council is of the sixth convocation, elected on 10 September 2017, 20 deputies were elected from party lists, the remaining 20 deputies from single-mandate constituencies. Vladimir Valentinovich Korbut, a member of the United Russia party, has been the chairman of the Omsk City Council since 27 September 2017.

== Economy ==
Gazprom's Omsk Refinery is the leading employer of Omsk.

The Russian Air Force base called Omsk-Severnyy (air base) is located nearby. The OKMO tank-design bureau, the S.M. Kirov Factory no. 185, the Omsk Transmash all produce weaponry. Transmash produced T-80 tanks from the 1970s, and handled the BTR-T, TOS-1, and the prototype Black Eagle tank.

=== Transportation ===
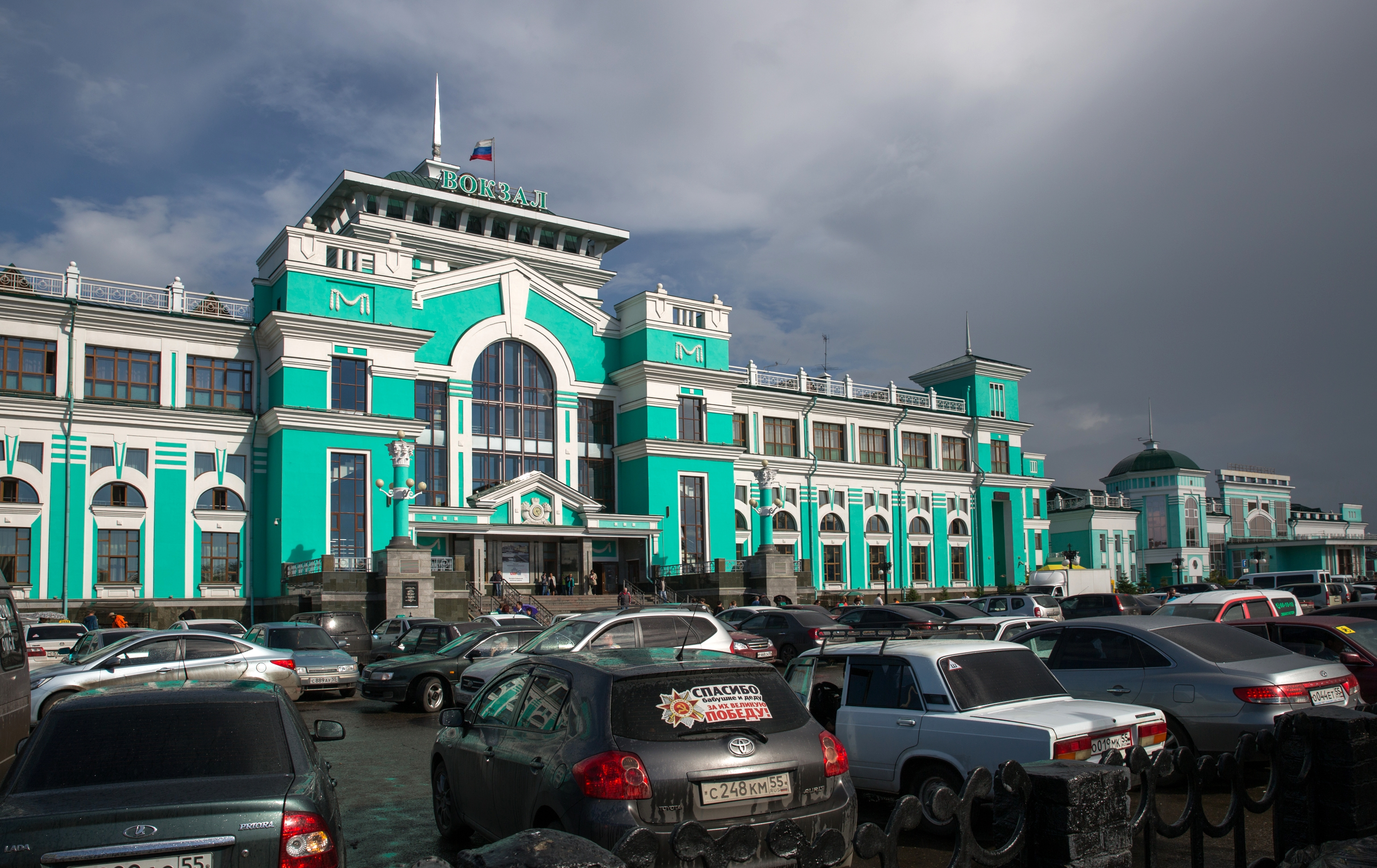
Omsk railway station

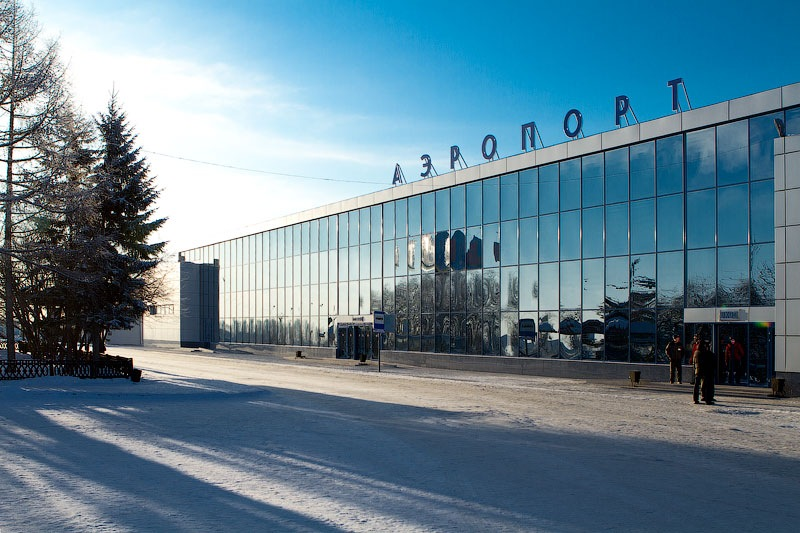
Omsk Airport

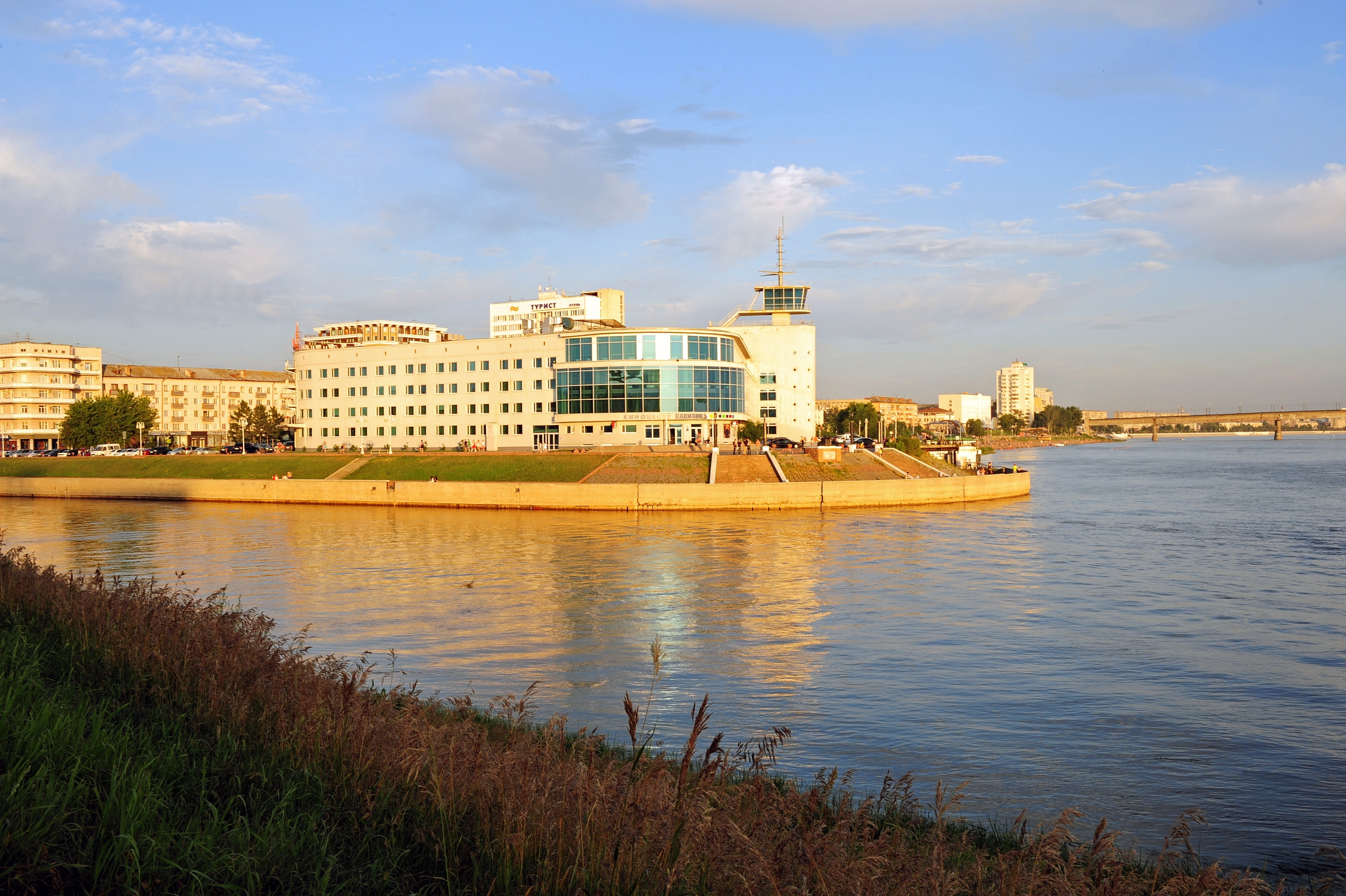
Omsk River Station on the Irtysh

Omsk is a major rail, road, and air hub. The city is served by a station on the Trans-Siberian Railway, and by the Tsentralny Airport Omsk possesses a river port on the Irtysh, offering service to domestic destinations and to cities within Kazakhstan. Omsk is in European route E30 (in Russia R254 highway) that provides access to all of Europe.

Municipal public transportation comprises large networks of buses and trolleys along with trams, although the latter has deteriorated severely since the collapse of the USSR. Marshrutkas (shared taxis) supplement municipal transit networks.

The Omsk Metro, proposed in the late 1980s but postponed for lack of funds, is currently under construction, with the Metro bridge over the Irtysh River. The bridge is already open for cars (upper level), but the metro (lower level) is still under construction. As a first step, one short line will connect the districts in the northwest with the city center. As of 2017, only one station is open and serves as a pedestrian subway.

== Honors ==
- The 3406 Omsk asteroid, which lies in the main asteroid belt, is named after the city.

== Notable people ==
- Innokenty Annensky (1855–1909), poet
- Nina Arkhipova (1921–2016), actress
- Vladislav Artemiev (born 1998), chess grandmaster
- Vladislav Dvorzhetsky (1939–1978), actor
- Eva Elfie (born 1997), actress
- Alexander Ivanov (born 1956), chess grandmaster
- Wacław Iwaszkiewicz-Rudoszański (1871–1922), Polish general
- Eduard Kunz (born 1980), pianist
- Dmitry Karbyshev (1880–1945), general
- Vilis Krištopans (born 1954), former Prime Minister of Latvia
- Valerian Kuybyshev (1888–1935), revolutionary
- Sergey Letov, jazz musician
- Yegor Letov, rock musician
- Vladimir Lukin, politician
- Leonid Martynov, poet
- Lyubov Polishchuk, actress
- Grigory Potanin, ethnographer and natural historian
- Ludmilla Radchenko, model and actress
- Nikolai Riumin, chess master
- Vlada Roslyakova, model
- Robert Rozhdestvensky, poet
- Vissarion Shebalin, composer
- Mikhail Shivlyakov, marine, strongman
- Valentina Talyzina, actress
- Tamāra Vilerte, Latvian chess player
- Mikhail Vrubel, artist
- Mikhail Ulyanov, actor
- Nikolai Yadrintsev, explorer and archaeologist
- Dmitry Yazov, Russian general
- Keyyo, Swedish comedian

=== Athletes ===
- Yaroslav Askarov, ice hockey goalie
- Egor Averin, ice hockey player
- Vladimir Barnashov, biathlete and biathlon coach
- Vitalina Batsarashkina, sports shooter
- Vera Biryukova, rhythmic gymnast
- Viktor Blinov, ice hockey player
- Tatiana Borodulina, speed skater
- Egor Chinakhov, ice hockey player
- Ksenia Dudkina, rhythmic gymnast
- Dmitrij Jaskin, ice hockey player
- Sergei Kalinin, ice hockey player
- Yevgeniya Kanayeva, rhythmic gymnast, first and only twice olympic champion at individual rhythmic gymnastics competition
- Yuliya Kosenkova, middle-distance athlete
- Vera Krasnova, speed skater
- Ilya Mikheyev, ice hockey player
- Marat Mulashev, professional football
- Nikita Nikitin, ice hockey player
- Nikita Pivtsakin, ice hockey player
- Anastasija Reiberger, pole vaulter
- Dennis Siver, mixed martial arts fighter
- Yuri Shatalov, ice hockey player
- Alexander Shlemenko, mixed martial arts fighter
- Galima Shugurova, rhythmic gymnast
- Sofya Skomorokh, rhythmic gymnast
- Roman Sloudnov, swimmer
- Alexander Svitov, ice hockey player
- Dmitri Sychev, association football player
- Andrei Taratukhin, ice hockey player
- Irina Tchachina, rhythmic gymnast
- Aleksei Tishchenko, boxer
- Polina Tsurskaya, figure skater

== Twin towns – sister cities ==
Omsk is twinned with:

- Antalya, Turkey
- Fuzhou, Fujian, China
- Gomel, Belarus
- Hamrun, Malta
- Kaifeng, Henan, China
- Lublin, Poland
- Manzhouli, Inner Mongolia, China
- Pavlodar, Kazakhstan
- Petropavl, Kazakhstan
- Púchov, Slovakia
- Ürümqi, Xinjiang, China
- Regional Municipality of York, Ontario, Canada
