= Omsk Metro =

Canceled rapid transit line in Omsk, Russia

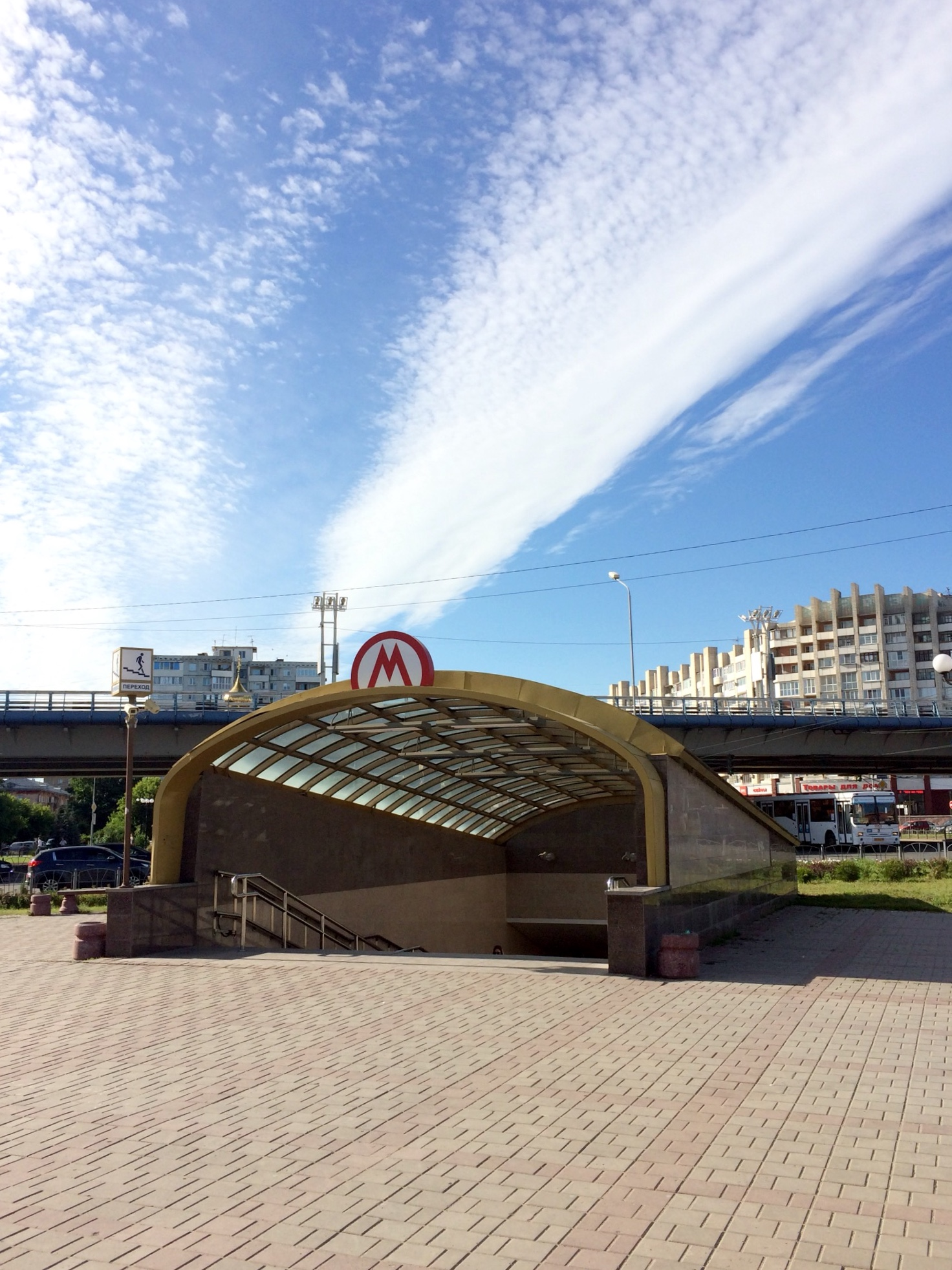
- Entrance to the Biblioteka Imeni Pushkina station

Overview
- Native name: Омский метрополитен Omskiy metropoliten
- Transit type: Rapid transit/Light metro
- Number of lines: 1 (planned)
- Number of stations: 4 (planned)

Operation
- Operation will start: Cancelled (May 2018)

Technical
- System length: 7.5 km (4.7 mi)
- Track gauge: 1,524 mm (5 ft)
- Average speed: 36 km/h (22 mph)

Omsk Metro (Russian: Омский метрополитен, Omskiy metropoliten) is a cancelled rapid transit line that underwent various phases of construction from 1992 to 2018 in Omsk, Russia. It was to become Siberia's second metropolitan underground railway system after the Novosibirsk Metro which opened in the mid-1980s.

Construction of the first line of the Metro suffered from many delays, with the planned opening date being postponed four times: from 2008 to 2010, then 2015, then again to 2016. In May 2018, the regional government of the Omsk Oblast stopped construction after 26 years, leaving behind an unfinished system with only one station that serves as a pedestrian underpass, and a double-decker metro/road bridge over the Irtysh river.

== History ==
Central planners in Moscow first identified Omsk as a metro-eligible city during the 1960s, due to its length along the Irtysh River and its relatively narrow streets. But after the plan was approved and financed, the planners decided to build an express tram instead, and the money allocated to Omsk was given to Chelyabinsk. In 1979, a Gosplan commission rejected a plan to build an express tram system since it was predicted to be unable to handle projected passenger flows without severely discomforting riders. In 1986, metro plans were revisited and financing began, along with the demolition of residential buildings to make way for tracks and a yard.

Construction began in 1992 between the stations Tupolevskaya (Russian: Туполевская) and Rabochaya (Рабочая ~ Workers' Station). The initial plans involved opening the section between the stations Marshala Zhukova and Rabochaya on the right bank of the Irtysh River to connect downtown to the manufacturing district, and then later to connect the line to the opposite bank of the Irtysh. Due to poor financial circumstances, by 2003 just the section between Tupolevskaya and Rabochaya was completed (with no intermediate stations). At that time the plans changed and the authorities decided to connect the two banks of the Irtsh with a metro bridge, going between one station on the right bank and three on the left bank. The combined metro (lower level) and motor-vehicle (upper level) bridge was built and opened to vehicular traffic in 2005.

The current phase of construction involves four stations:

- Biblioteka Imeni Pushkina (Библиотека имени Пушкина – Pushkin Library)
- Zarechnaya (Заречная – Over the River)
- Kristall (Кристалл)
- Sobornaya (Соборная – Cathedral Station)

This section was expected to be 6.1 kilometers (3.8 mi) long, with an average train speed of 36 km/h and a travel time of 10 minutes and 12 seconds: daily ridership was projected at 190,000 passengers per day (about 69.4 million per year).

On 2 September 2011, Biblioteka Imeni Pushkina opened to the public as a pedestrian underpass: at the time, metro constructors expected the system to open in the autumn of 2015.

Since 2014, construction on the system had stalled, but an 84.6 million Ruble contract was awarded to the Russian firm Sibmost to carry out detailed design studies on completing the 7.5-kilometer (4.7 mi) light metro line, from Biblioteka Pushkina to Prospekt Rokossovskogo, with five stations. On 9 September 2015, it was announced that the construction would continue, in view of the high cost of preserving and maintaining the core structural features of the metro.

=== Suspension and revival attempts (2018–present) ===
According to Meduza on 11 May 2018, the regional government of the Omsk Oblast announced the previous day that they would indefinitely suspend construction on the Omsk Metro after 26 years: the regional government instead allocated ₽80 million (about US$1.3 million in 2018) for the development of a "conservation project" that would try to complete Zarechnaya station, and to maintain the tunnel between Pushkin Library and Zarechnaya. The regional government also announced that they would fill in the foundation pits at Kristall and Sobornaya, and return them to public use.

== Stations ==
The first two phases of the Omsk Metro were expected to deliver one line with ten stations, all of them underground. The 2014 light metro study also included Prospekt Rokossovskogo.

Station English	Station Russian	Photograph	Okrug	Opened	Notes	Ref.
Prospekt Rokossovskogo	Проспект Рокоссовского	—N/a	Kirovsky	—N/a	This station was included in the unsuccessful 2014 light metro study.	
Sobornaya	Соборная		Kirovsky	—N/a		
Kristall	Кристалл		Kirovsky	—N/a		
Zarechnaya	Заречная		Kirovsky	—N/a		
Biblioteka Imeni Pushkina	Библиотека имени Пушкина		Tsentralny	2 September 2011	Biblioteka Imeni Pushkina is currently a pedestrian underpass: the platforms are also complete, albeit unfitted and closed off to the public.	
Torgovy Tsentr	Торговый Центр	—N/a	Tsentralny	—N/a		
Prospekt Zhukova	Проспект Жукова	—N/a	Tsentralny	—N/a		
Lermontovskaya	Лермонтовская	—N/a	Tsentralny	—N/a		
Parkovaya	Парковая	—N/a	Oktyabrsky	—N/a		
Tupolevskaya	Туполевская		Oktyabrsky	—N/a		
Rabochaya	Рабочая		Oktyabrsky	—N/a		

- Biblioteka Imeni Pushkina was planned as Krasny Put' (Красный Путь — Red Way).
- Kristall was planned as Bulvar Arkhitektorov (Бульвар Архитекторов — Boulevard of the Architects)
- Sobornaya was planned as Avtovokzal (Автовокзал — Bus Terminal).

== Cultural impact ==
Omsk Metro map with only one station

Construction delays have made the Omsk Metro a subject of humour in the city, with residents using the unfinished metro as a metaphor for unfulfilled promises: Radio Free Europe/Radio Liberty and Yuri Litvinenko of Atlas Obscura have noted an unofficial map and mobile app that showed only one station (Pushkin Library), as well as souvenir fare tokens for the incomplete system.
