= Dormition Cathedral, Omsk =

Cathedral in Omsk, Russia

Coordinates: 54°59′24″N 73°22′01″E

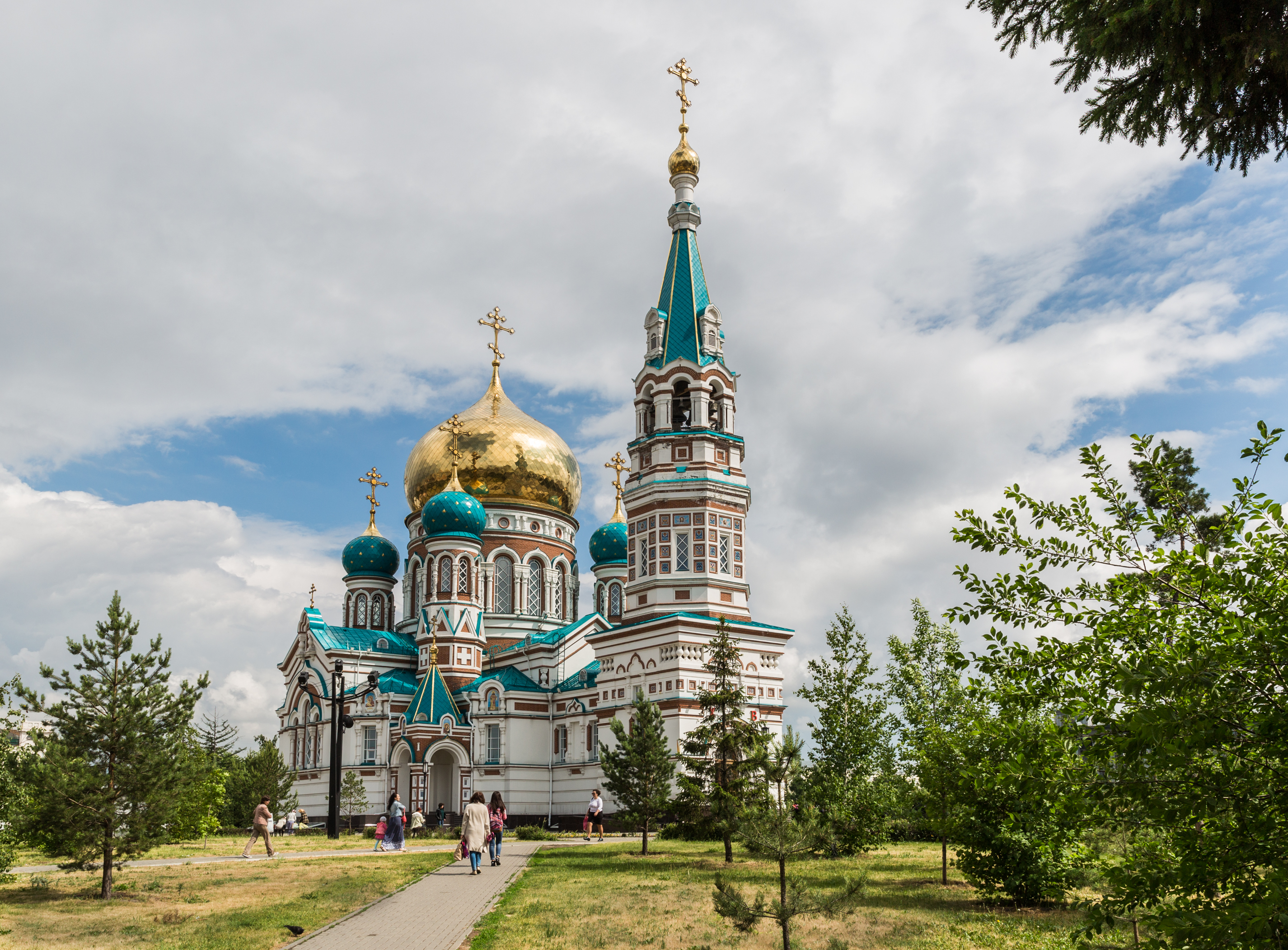
Uspensky Cathedral in Omsk

The Dormition Cathedral (Russian language: Успенский собор) in Omsk is one of the largest churches in Siberia. Its fanciful design of many shapes and colors utilizes a plethora of elements from the Russian and Byzantine medieval architectural vocabulary. The main square of Omsk takes its name from the cathedral.

The first stone of a new church was laid by Tsesarevich Nicholas during his journey across Siberia in 1891. A revivalist design was commissioned from Ernest Würrich, a fashionable architect based in Saint Petersburg. The church was consecrated in 1898. It was shut down after the Russian Revolution and was blown up in 1935. The Russian Orthodox Church had the edifice rebuilt to Würrich's original designs in the early 21st century.

The worshippers from all over Siberia come to the church in order to venerate the relics of Bishop Sylvester, a Kolchak supporter who was martyred by the Bolsheviks in 1920.

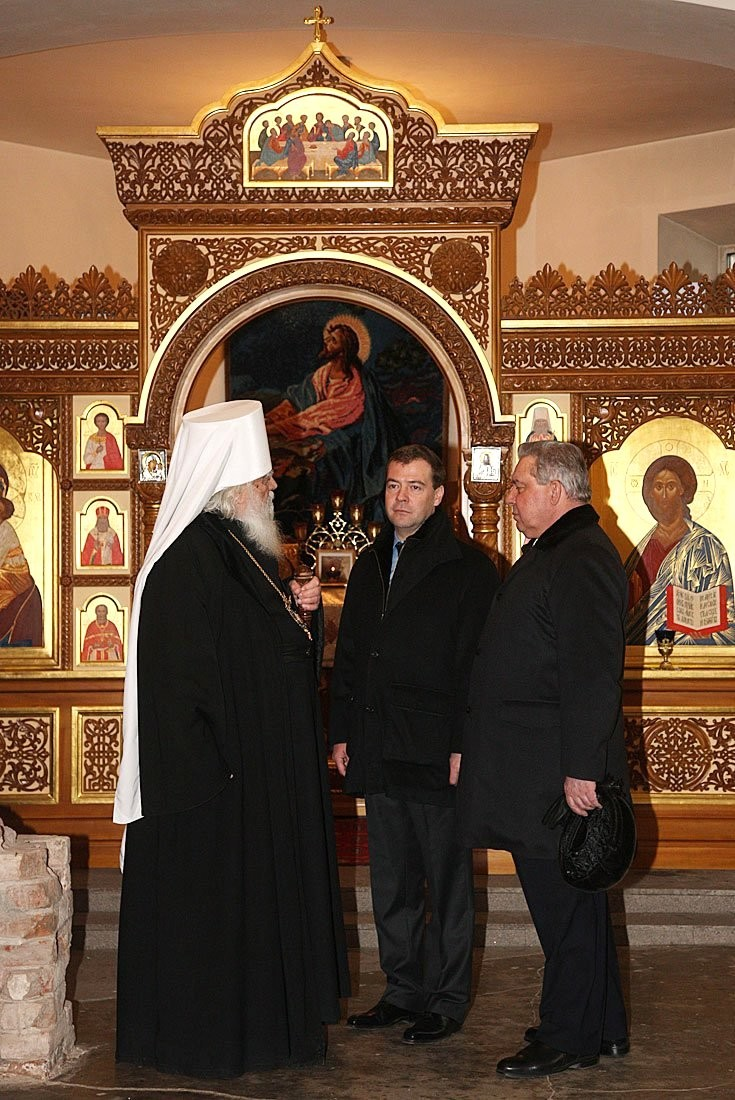
Dmitry Medvedev with Omsk Governor Leonid Polezhayev, 12 February 2010
