= Henryk Domski =

Polish communist politician and activist

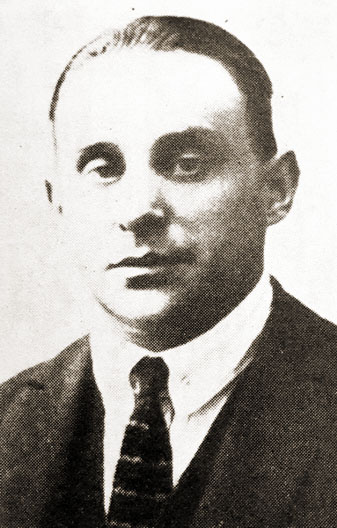
- Henryk Stein-Domski
- Born: September 5, 1883; Warsaw, Russian Empire
- Died: October 26, 1937 (aged 54); Moscow, Soviet Union
- Political party: Communist Party of Poland (1917–); Social Democracy of the Kingdom of Poland and Lithuania (1904–1917)

Henryk Stein-Domski (real name: Stein; pseud Kamiensky; 5 September 1883 – 26 October 1937) was a Polish communist politician and activist. He led the Communist Party of Poland in 1925, before being ousted and repressed as a suspected Trotskyist.

== Career ==
Domski was born into a middle class Jewish family in Warsaw, the son of a commercial agent. He never used the family name 'Stein' during years as a political activist. He joined the Social Democracy of the Kingdom of Poland and Lithuania (SDKPiL), led by Rosa Luxemburg and Jan Tyszka in Warsaw, in July 1904. In 1905–1906, he ran the party organisation in the Praga district of Warsaw. Arrested twice in 1906, he was interned in the Warsaw Citadel, until Match 1907. After his release, he moved to Łódź, but was rearrested and exiled to Chelyabinsk, in Siberia. He escaped after four months. In 1908–1915, he lived in exile in Paris, Zürich, Kraków and Berlin.

In 1911, Domski supported the rozlamovist, group, led by Yakov Hanecki and Karl Radek, who objected to Jan Tyszka's leadership style. When Vladimir Lenin moved to Kraków, where Domski lived, they collaborated in founding Pravda, and became close, despite a sharp disagreement on the issue of Polish independence, to which Domski shared Rosa Luxemburg's opposition.

Domski returned to Warsaw in 1915. He supported the Bolsheviks in 1917, and in December was a founder member of the Polish Communist Party, a member of its Central Committee, and one of its leading propagandists. In July 1919, he was arrested and imprisoned again in the Warsaw citadel After his release he was assigned by Comintern to work with the German Communist Party.

== Emergence as Party leader ==
Domski first emerged as a critic of the official line in July 1920, during the Polish–Soviet War, when he called on the soviet government to abandon the idea of using the Red Army to bring Poland under communist rule, and welcomed a report that peace negotiations might be in prospect. Writing in the German communist newspaper Rote Fahne, he argued: "Soviet Russia's struggle against Polish reaction is not merely military, but rather has a political aim: erecting the dictatorship of the proletariat in Poland. However, this dictatorship can only survive if it comes from within..". He was a delegate to the Fourth Congress of Comintern in November–December 1922, but disagreed with the official line, and attempted to explain why, but other delegates thought his statement was too long, and cheerfully drowned it out by singing the Internationale.

After the failure of the Hamburg Rising and a similar fiasco in Cracow in autumn 1923, Domski In the KPRP initially belonged to an ultra-left group centered around Władysław Kowalski and became a leading voice of the ultra-left in European communism, who opposed united front tactics, and opposed the policy of dividing the land among the peasants. In a newspaper article in September, he denounced the leaders of the Polish and German communist parties, who most prominent figures were, respectively, Adolf Warski, and with the leadership of the German CP, headed by Heinrich Brandler as 'neo-Mensheviks'. In February 1924, Domski, Julian Lenski and two others, all based in exile in Berlin, co-signed a document calling on the Polish communist party to develop a 'Bolshevik backbone'.

The triumvirate who led the Polish party, who were known as the 'Three Ws' were 'in effect deposed' during the Fifth Congress of Comintern in June–July 1924.Joseph Stalin and Grigory Zinoviev, the chairman of Comintern, who was tightening control over Europe's communist parties, gave his backing to the Berlin Four, despite having criticised Domski in the past as an ultra-leftist. In September, Domski returned illegally to Poland to take control of the party. During his brief leadership, he banned party members from joining members of the Polish Socialist Party on a Mayday demonstration, and attacked the German communist party for collaborating with the SDP.

== Downfall ==
In July 1925, a commission chaired by Stalin accused Domski of a series of errors dating back to his criticism of the war with Poland five years earlier. In October, he was forced to resign from the Central Committee of the Polish Communist Party. He was also compelled to remain in the Soviet union, where he worked as a journalist. The real reason for his dismissal, according to the historian Isaac Deutscher, was not any political errors he may have made, but that he backed Zinoviev in emerging conflict between Zinoviev and Stalin. Lenski, who backed Stalin was retained as party leader.

In 1927, Domski declared his support for the Left Opposition, led by Leon Trotsky and Zinoviev. He was expelled from the Polish Communist Party in February 1928, and arrested. In August, he joined Zinoviev and his supporters in renouncing the opposition and seeking readmission to the party. After his release, he returned to Moscow, resumed work as a journalist, and was associated with the Polish section of the Russian Association of Proletarian Writers. In April 1930, he was allowed to rejoin the Communist Party, and later the Union of Soviet Writers.

Early in 1935, when dozens of former associates of Zinoviev were arrested following the assassination of Sergei Kirov, Domski was again expelled from the communist party. He was arrested on 3 November 1936, and shot on 26 October 1937, and buried in the Donski Cemetery, in Moscow.

He was rehabilitated in 1956.
