= Bronisław Wesołowski =

Polish communist revolutionary and labor leader

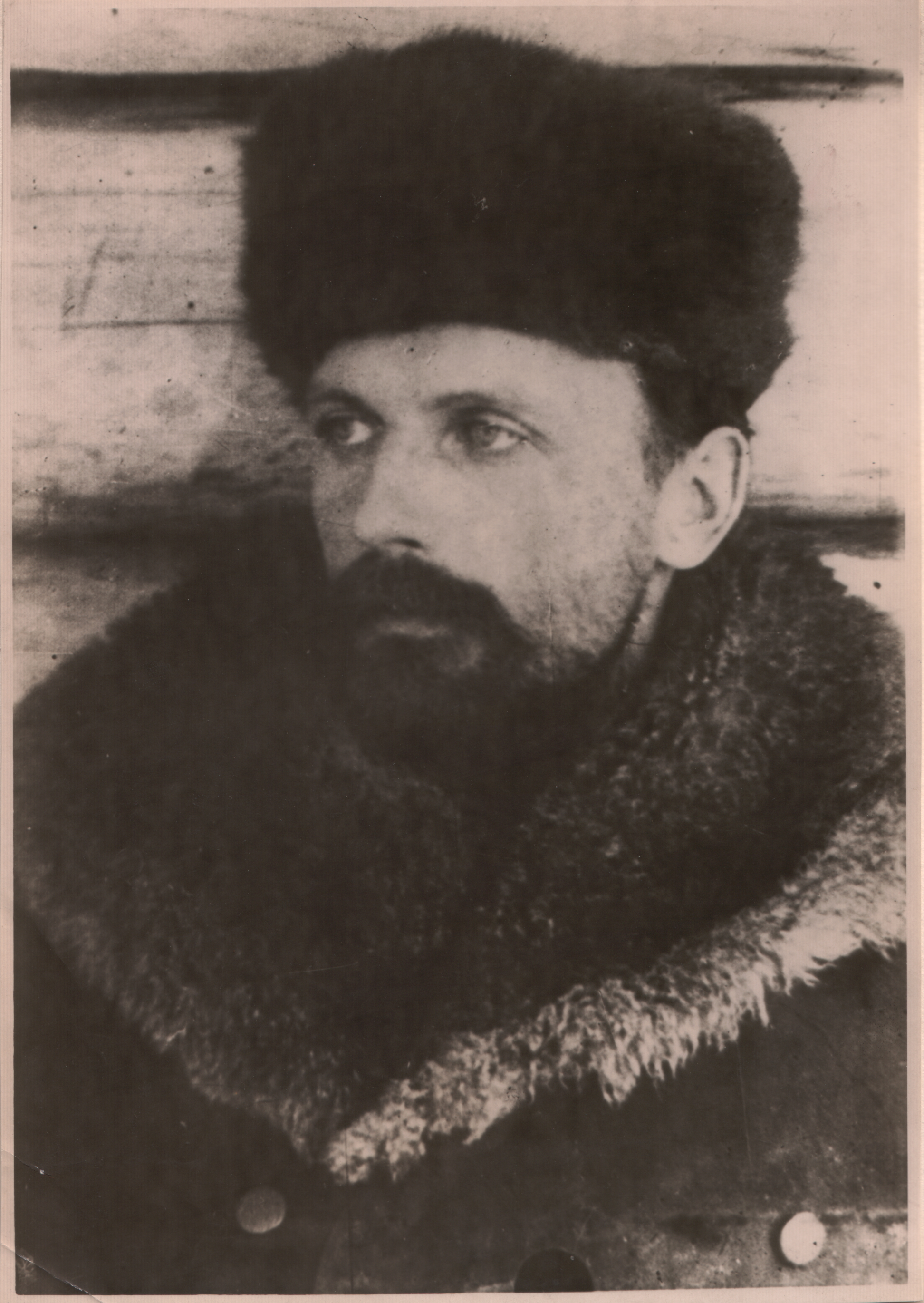

Bronisław Euzebiusz Wesołowski (14 August 1870 – 2 January 1919) was a Polish communist revolutionary and labor leader, active in both the Polish and Russian revolutionary movements. Also known by his pseudonyms Smutny and Jan from Kyiv, he was one of the founders of the Social Democracy of the Kingdom of Poland (SDPK - later the SDPKiL) and organizers of its 1st Congress in 1894.

He was arrested soon after that Congress and spent more than ten years in Siberia, being freed around the time of the Revolution of 1905, then attending the 5th Congress of the Russian Social Democratic Labour Party (RSDLP) held in London in 1907. After returning illegally to Warsaw he was arrested again in 1908 and spent another nine years in hard labor and exile before being released with the February Revolution.

Upon arriving in Petrograd in February 1917 he joined the Bolsheviks or RSDLP(b). From March 1917, he was a representative of the SDKPiL to the Central Committee of the RSDLP(b), and worked in the secretariat of the Central Committee. From July 1917, he was a candidate member of the Executive Committee of the SDKPiL groups in Russia and a delegate to the 6th Congress of the RSDLP(b). In August, he was elected to the Petrograd Central City Duma. In October, he worked on the staff of the Petrograd Military Revolutionary Committee and was a member of the All-Russian Central Executive Committee of the 2nd-5th convocations. He worked in the All-Russian Theatre of the All-Russian Central Executive Committee.

In December 1918, he led the Soviet Red Cross delegation to Warsaw to negotiate a prisoner-of-war exchange. The Polish refused to deal with them and expelled the negotiating team. Near the border with Soviet Russia, on the night of 1/2 January 1919, he and the rest of the delegation were seized by Polish gendarmes, taken to a wood and shot.

== Biography ==
A Pole, born in a village near Warsaw, he became a committed socialist while in his teens. He studied at Zurich Polytechnic as an electrical engineer.

In 1889, together with Adolf Warski and Julian Marchlewski, he founded the Union of Polish Workers. In 1893, the Union was disbanded and its members joined the Social Democracy of the Kingdom of Poland, founded in Zurich by Rosa Luxemburg and Leo Jogiches, which later adopted the name the Social Democracy of the Kingdom of Poland and Lithuania.

Wesołowski returned to Poland, and was the only member of the Zurich-based leadership to attend the founding congress of the SDPK in March 1894. He was arrested soon afterwards, and spent more than ten years in Siberia.

Released around the time of the 1905 revolution, he settled in Kyiv, where he became involved in the work of the RSDLP. In 1907, he participated in the 5th Congress of the RSDLP, supporting, along with the entire SDKPiL delegation, the Bolsheviks led by V. I. Lenin. He later returned illegally to Warsaw, where he was arrested again in 1908 and spent another nine years in prison and exile.

After the February Revolution he returned to Petrograd from exile in the Yenisei Governorate and joined the Bolsheviks, where he represented Polish Social Democracy on the Central Committee of the RSDLP(b). From June 1917, he was a candidate member of the Executive Committee of Polish Social Democratic groups in Russia. From spring to November 1917, he was a member of the Secretariat of the Central Committee of the RSDLP(b) and a member of the Petrograd Military Revolutionary Committee. He was a delegate to the Second Congress of Soviets and a member of the All-Russian Central Executive Committee.

In December 1918, he left for Poland at the head of the Russian Red Cross Delegation, which was to facilitate the return to Russia of numerous prisoners of war held in Poland or passing through its territory from Germany and Austria. Wesołowski's delegation included Maria Alter, her son, Dr. Leon Alter, Dr. Ludwig Klotsman, and the mission secretary, Magdalena Aivazova.

Piłsudski's government was not interested in the speedy return of two million Russian prisoners of war who had combat experience and could have swelled the ranks of the Red Guard and other units of the Soviet state, which was hostile to Poland.

On the evening of December 22, gendarmes arrived at the hotel where Wesołowski and the mission representatives were staying, conducted a search, and arrested all five. The Poles found it suspicious that Wesołowski had brought with him approximately 3 million rubles, although given the rampant inflation of the time, this sum could not be considered sufficient for organizing subversive activities.

The arrest of the Soviet representatives provoked a massive 20,000-strong demonstration in Warsaw on December 29 in support of the mission. An attempt to disperse it resulted in a shootout, during which six demonstrators were killed and 11 wounded. On December 30, fearing an armed attempt to free the arrested, Wesołowski and the members of the mission were secretly escorted from Warsaw by gendarmes and soldiers to the border of the Grodno province, near Bielsk, ostensibly for deportation to Soviet Russia. However, the delegation never returned home.

On January 2, 1919, Bronisław Wesołowski was executed by Polish gendarmes along with the other members of the mission near the village of Wyliny-Ruś, in the High Mazovian County. The gendarmes covered the bodies with branches and snow. However, one member of the mission, Dr. Leon Alter, managed to survive. A bullet struck him in the chest just above the heart, knocking him unconscious. The gendarmes concluded that he, like everyone else, was dead. After regaining consciousness, Alter reached a nearby village, whose residents helped him.

Meanwhile, in Moscow there was no news about the members of Wesołowski's mission, who had disappeared without a trace, in connection with which, on January 7, 1919, a Note was transmitted by radio from the People's Commissar of Foreign Affairs of the RSFSR to the Minister of Foreign Affairs of Poland, Vasilevsky, which stated: "...As for the Delegation of the Russian Red Cross, which was supposed to take care of numerous prisoners of war in Poland who were there or passing through its territory, we have not yet received any news directly from this Delegation, and we are still waiting for precise information from it, until which the question of its fate is not finally clarified for us." People's Commissar for Foreign Affairs Chicherin - Izvestia Newspaper, No. 5 (557), p. 5, January 10, 1919

Meanwhile, Leon Alter, having reached first Minsk and then Moscow, revealed the truth about the murder of the rest of the delegation. The Polish government did not acknowledge these assassinations, but an investigation into the crimes was nevertheless launched under pressure from People's Commissar for Foreign Affairs Georgy Chicherin. The bodies of the members of the Soviet Red Cross mission were discovered. The Polish government claimed that the murdered were victims of robbery, although their money was found untouched.

On January 28, 1919, the Soviet-Polish War began, and the case of the execution of the Red Cross mission from the RSFSR was forgotten, and the perpetrators not only went unpunished, but were acquitted as patriots.
