= Mieczysław Kozłowski =

Polish lawyer (1876–1927)

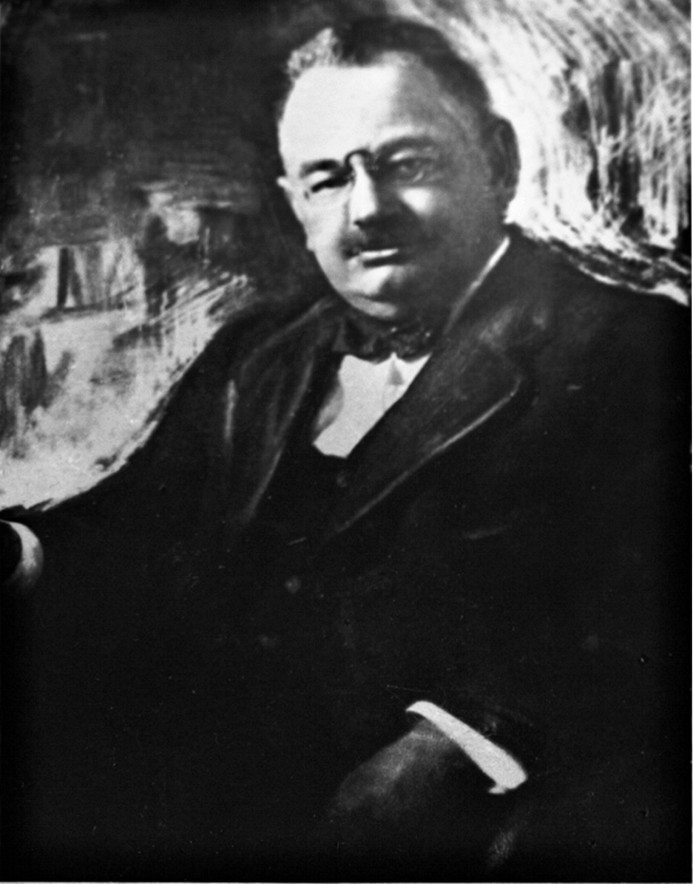
Portrait of Kozłowski in 1917

Mieczysław Kozłowski (Russian: Мечислав Ю́льевич Козло́вский, Mechislav Yulievich Kozlovsky; 13 January [O.S. 1 January] 1876 – 3 March 1927) was a Polish-Lithuanian Marxist revolutionary, Bolshevik, Soviet diplomat and jurist.

== Life and career ==
=== Early revolutionary career ===
He was born into a Polish family of a nobleman and teacher in Vilnius. After graduating from the University of Moscow, he started practicing law from the early 1890s.

Kozłowski was a member of the Lithuanian Workers' Union and editor of its newspaper Rabocheye Obozreniye. In 1899, together with Felix Dzerzhinsky, he contributed to the merger of the Lithuanian Workers' Union with the Social Democracy of the Kingdom of Poland into a single party Social Democracy of the Kingdom of Poland and Lithuania (SDKPiL). During the 1905 Revolution, he was a member of the military revolutionary organization and the strike committee in Vilnius. After the suppression of the revolution by the Tsarist government, he emigrated. In 1907 he was among the delegates to the 5th Congress of the RSDLP in London. Beginning in 1909, he led revolutionary agitation in the St. Petersburg Metalworkers' Union.

In March 1907, he was Vladimir Lenin's representative in a special party court session. Subsequently, he was a defense attorney in many political trials in St. Petersburg; he also joined the Bolshevik party. In 1914, together with Zbigniew Fabierkiewicz, he published Nowa Trybuna, the legal journal of SDKPiL. In his apartment, through a liaison officer of German intelligence donated money to finance the Bolshevik activities, primarily to the newspaper Pravda.

=== In the Russian Revolution ===
After the February Revolution of 1917, Kozłowski was elected a deputy of the Petrograd Soviet and a member of its executive committee, All-Russian Central Executive Committee of the Soviets of Workers' and Soldiers' Deputies, as well as chairman of the Vyborg District Duma. In April 1917, he was elected a member of the Petrograd Committee of the RSDLP(b).

At the beginning of July 1917, Kozłowski, after an investigation by the military counterintelligence of the Russian General Staff, was accused by the Kerensky government together with Lenin, Grigory Zinoviev and others of "high treason and espionage", as well as of "laundering" money from the German General Staff transferred from Berlin through Alexander Parvus and Yakov Ganetsky to Disconto-Gesellschaft and Stockholm Nya Banken, and from here to the Siberian Bank in Petrograd. On 6 July he was arrested at his apartment on Preobrazhenskaya Street.

After the October Revolution, Kozłowski worked as chairman of the Investigative Commission of the Petrograd Military Revolutionary Committee, dealt with the junker-officer mutiny on 29 October and the monarchist organization of Vladimir Purishkevich.

=== In the Soviet Union ===
From 29 March 1918 to 15 November 1920 he was the chairman of the Small Council of People's Commissars of the Russian Soviet Federative Socialist Republic (RSFSR). In late August 1918, he conducted the first interrogation of Fanny Kaplan after her attempt to assassinate Vladimir Lenin. In January 1919, he authored the "Basic Guidelines on Criminal Law of the RSFSR" which announced in December 1919 as a resolution of the People's Commissariat of Justice of the RSFSR.

After the creation of the Lithuania Soviet Socialist Republic he was appointed the People's Commissar of Justice and subsequently the People's Commissar of Justice of the Lithuanian–Byelorussian Soviet Socialist Republic (Litbel).

In 1922–1923, he worked as Consul General in Vienna and Deputy Plenipotentiary in Austria. Soon he was transferred to diplomatic work in Rome, and then to Berlin. In 1923, he was recalled from the diplomatic service and was appointed chief legal adviser of the People's Commissariat of Railways. In 1924, he was a delegate to the 13th Congress of the RCP(b).

Kozłowski died in 1927 in Moscow and is buried at the Novodevichy cemetery in Moscow.
