= Yakov Ganetsky =

Polish communist and close associate of Vladimir Lenin

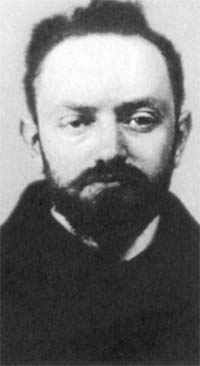
- Born: Jakub Fürstenberg; 15 March 1879; Warsaw, Congress Poland
- Died: 26 November 1937 (aged 58); Moscow, RSFSR
- Known for: Communist activist
- Political party: Social Democracy of the Kingdom of Poland and Lithuania

Yakov Hanecki (known in Russia as Yakov Stanislavovich Ganetsky – Яков Станиславович Ганецкий), real name Jakub Fürstenberg (Fuerstenberg) also known as Kuba (15 March 1879 — 26 November 1937) was a prominent Polish communist and close associate of Vladimir Lenin, famous as one of the financial wizards who arranged, through his close working relationship with Alexander Parvus, funding for the Bolsheviks who led the October Revolution of 1917 – after which he served as a middle ranking Soviet official until his arrest and execution in 1937.

== Early career ==
Yakov Hanecki was born in Warsaw, Vistula Land, Russian Empire, the son of Stanislav von Fürstenberg, a beer manufacturer of German–Jewish descent, who had adopted Poland as his homeland. In 1896 he joined the Social Democracy of the Kingdom of Poland (SDKP – later the Social Democracy of the Kingdom of Poland and Lithuania (SDKPiL)) led by Rosa Luxemburg and her lover, Leo Jogiches. He moved to Germany in 1901 and studied in rapid succession at Berlin, Heidelberg, and Zurich universities. From 1902, he was a professional revolutionary, normally based in Cracow, under Austrian rule, organising the transport of illegal literature across the Russian border. In August 1903, as a member of the Main Administration of the SDKPiL, he was one of two Polish delegates to the Second Congress of the Russian Social Democratic Labour Party (RSDLP) in Brussels. The Congress later adjourned to London, under pressure from the Belgian police, and there the RSDLP split into its Bolshevik and Menshevik factions, but Hanecki and the other Polish delegate, Adolf Warski, did not make the journey to London, having failed to agree terms on which the RSDLP and SDKPiL could collaborate.

At the outbreak of the 1905 revolution, Hanecki returned illegally to Warsaw, with Felix Dzerzhinsky to run the SDKPiL's underground organisation, until Jogiches arrived, in October. He was a Polish delegate to the Fourth and Fifth RSDLP congresses in Stockholm, April 1906, and London, May 1907, and at the latter was elected an alternate member of the Central Committee of the RSDLP. Arrested several times, he escaped every time. He also facilitated Jogiches's escape from prison in April 1907, by bribing a police officer.

But in 1910, exasperated by Jogiches's refusal to allow discussion within the SDKPiL over issues such as whether to participate in the recently legalised trade unions (which Jogiches opposed), Hanecki toured Germany and Austria, organising what became known as the 'Zhaddovites'. This group held its own conference in Warsaw in December, and subsequently created a separate organisation, of which Hanecki was the undisputed leader. Other members included Karl Radek, Josef Unshlicht, Yakov Dolecki – all later high-ranking officials in the Soviet Union – and two future leaders of the Communist Party of Poland, Henryk Domski and Julian Lenski.

== Lenin's agent ==
Hanecki first met Lenin in Brussels in 1903, and was in contact with him in Finland in 1907, and assisted him in moving his household to Cracow in 1912. He also persuaded Lenin to intervene in Polish affairs, siding with the Rozlamovists against Leo Jogiches and Rosa Luxemburg, and became one of Lenin's most trusted agents. He acted as chairman of the three man committee – whose other members were Lenin and Grigori Zinoviev – who looked into whether Roman Malinovsky, the former head of the Bolshevik parliamentary delegation, was a police spy, and wrongly exonerated him. Lenin and Hanecki were living in Poronin, a village close to the border, when war broke out between Austria and Russia in August 1914, and Lenin was threatened with arrest, as a Russian. Hanecki rescued him by arranging transport to the nearest town, Nowy Targ where – according to Lenin's widow – he warned the local chief of police that Lenin was an important figure in the world socialist movement and "a man for whose life he, the commander, would have to answer."

In 1915, Hanecki moved via Switzerland to Copenhagen, where he formed a commercial company, Handels-og Eksportkompagniet A/S (Trade and Export Co. Ltd.), with himself as chairman of the board of directors, and his wife as the book keeper. Half the start-up capital was provided by the wealthy ex-revolutionary Alexander Parvus, the other half by a mysterious individual named Georg Sklarz, who was probably a German agent. The company traded in thermometers, syringes and drugs and German-made office equipment. In January 1917, Hanecki was hauled before a judge for exporting medical goods to Sweden without a licence, fined heavily, expelled from Denmark, and put on a ferry to Stockholm, where he seems to have had no difficulty re-establishing his wholesale business, trading in contraceptives. After the February revolution, he was active in helping exiled Russian revolutionaries to return to Russia – most notably Lenin, whom he supplied with money for the journey, and greeted when his party arrived in Sweden after crossing Germany in a 'sealed train' in April 1917. Lenin appointed him a member of the three man Stockholm bureau of the Bolshevik party, with Karl Radek and Vatslav Vorovsky.

In July 1917, after an abortive attempt to overthrow Russia's provisional government, Lenin was accused by government supporters of being a paid German agent. It was alleged that the German general staff was funneling money to the Bolsheviks, with Hanecki as the go-between. The head of the Provisional Government, Alexander Kerensky claimed in his memoirs that the government had proof that Hanecki intended to enter Russia in July, carrying incriminating material, and would have had him arrested, but he was alerted in time. At the time, Lenin denied that Hanecki was a Bolshevik, or that the Bolsheviks had ever received money from him. This was untrue. He subsidised both Lenin, and his old Polish comrades who were now working with the Bolsheviks, but the evidence is that the money he gave them came from his profitable smuggling operations, rather than directly from the German government – though there is a question over whether he could have established himself in business without the indirect help of the German government.

In the summer of 1917, the Central Committee of the RSDLP (b) examined the personal case of Ganetsky and Mieczysław Kozłowski, and he was accused of speculation and smuggling, Ganetsky, in his testimony about this company, reported: "It was business, I turned to him and offered my services. Parvus first offered me money for my personal equipment in commerce. But, having no experience, I did not want to personally do business with other people's money. A little later, a joint-stock company was organized, and I was the manager."

== Personality and later career ==
Hanecki moved to Russia, with Karl Radek, eleven days after the Bolshevik revolution, and was appointed deputy chairman of the state bank, but despite his 21 years in the revolutionary movement and obvious ability as an administrator, he had no significant political influence within the Soviet communist party. He was "never a popular person; he was a hard and ruthless man, of unattractive appearance and personality...but of his commercial ability, hard work and conspiratorial talent, there can be no doubt." When his membership of the Communist Party was under review in 1921, he supplied personal references from Lenin and Dzerzhinsky. However, after those two men were dead, he served Josif Stalin with the same uncritical loyalty that he had shown Lenin.

In 1918, he was appointed chairman of the state bank. In 1920–23, he worked for the People's Commissariat of Foreign Affairs. He handled financial dealings with Poland after the Treaty of Riga established relations between the two countries. Later, he successfully negotiated with Poland for the return of Lenin's archive, left behind in Cracow. In October 1921 he negotiated and signed the Treaty of Kars with Turkey, on behalf of the Soviet republics of Georgia, Armenia and Azerbaijan. Simultaneously, he was Soviet envoy to Latvia in 1920–22. In 1923–29, he worked for the People's Commissariat for Foreign Trade. In 1929–32, he was on the Praesidium of the supreme economic council. In 1932–35, he was head of the State Union for Music, Stage and Circus. From 1935, he was director of the Museum of the Revolution of the USSR.

== Arrest and execution ==
Hanecki was arrested on 18 July 1937, along with his wife, Giza, and son, Stanislav. Police who raided his apartment (in the "House on the Embankment", 2, Serafimovicha Street, apartment 10) found a wealth of banned literature, written by communists who had since fallen foul of the Stalin regime, such as Leon Trotsky and Nikolai Bukharin. He was accused of having an unauthorized meeting with Polish military intelligence during a September 1933 trip to retrieve a Lenin archive, as well as having been a German spy. He refused to confess, despite torture, and despite being confronted in prison with others, including Adolf Warski, who had given in under interrogation and incriminated him. His case was referred to Stalin, who wrote the single word 'liquidate' by his name. Hanecki was sentenced to death after a 15-minute trial on 26 November 1937, during which his assistant, Petermeier, testified that he had travelled to Berlin at Hanecki's instruction to collect German marks from a Mr. Senior. He was executed the same day. His wife and son were also shot.

He was posthumously rehabilitated in 1954.
