= Julian Leszczyński =

Polish political activist (1889–1939)

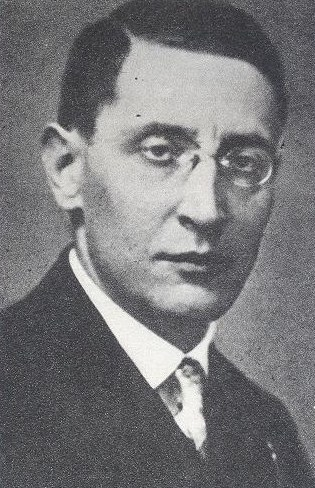
- Portrait of Leszczyński prior to 1939
- Born: January 8, 1889; Płock, Congress Poland
- Died: August 20, 1939 (aged 50); Moscow, Soviet Union
- Other name: Leński
- Education: Jagiellonian University
- Political party: KPP
- Other political affiliations: SDKPiL
- Movement: Communism

Julian Leszczyński (Polish pronunciation: [ˈjuljan lɛˈʂtʂɨj̃skʲi]; 8 January 1889 – 21 September 1939), also known by pseudonym Leński, was a Polish communist political activist, publicist, and leader of the Stalinist faction in the Communist Party of Poland (KPP).

He led the party in the 1930s, and himself fell victim to the Great Purge.

== Life and career ==
Leszczyński was born into a working-class family in Plock, in the Russian-occupied sector of Poland, he went to high school in his native city, and became a socialist at the age of 16. Lenski was arrested and expelled from school for leading a student strike during the 1905 Russian Revolution, and in that same year joined the Social Democracy of the Kingdom of Poland and Lithuania (SPDKiL) in Warsaw. In 1909–12, he studied philosophy at Kraków university, after which he lived illegally, working as a full-time party organiser. When the SDPKiL split, he supported the rozlamovist opposition, led by Jacob Hanecki and Karl Radek, who were closer to the Bolsheviks than the old SDPKiL leaders, Rosa Luxemburg and Leo Jogiches. He represented the group at a Bolshevik conference that in Poronino, near Krakow, in September 1913, organised by Vladimir Lenin. Arrested in October 1913, he was released after three months for lack of evidence, but was arrested again in 1914, and was one of a batch of Polish prisoners transferred to Oryol fortress at the start of the war with Germany. Later he was exiled to Mtsensk, then was released on parole.

Lenski was in Petrograd (St Petersburg) during the February Revolution and represented the reunited SDPKiL at the Bolshevik conference in April, where Lenin called for a second revolution. During the October Revolution, he took part in seizing the main post office. In the new Soviet government, he was appointed chief commissar for Polish Affairs in the People's Commissariat for Nationalities, which was headed by Joseph Stalin. In February–April 1919, he was People's Commissar for Education in the short-lived Lit-Bel republic. In 1919–20, he was head of the Polish bureau of the Ukraine communist party. He was one of a minority of Polish exiles in soviet Russia who backed the decision to pursue the Polish-soviet war in 1920.

In autumn 1923, Lenski rose to prominence in the Polish communist party (KPP) by attacking the triumvirate known as the 'Three W's', whose most senior member was Adolf Warski, for their alleged weakness during the political crisis in Poland that year, and over their support they had shown for Leon Trotsky during the power struggle that began during Lenin's terminal illness. During 1924, he worked for Comintern, in Berlin, Paris, and Warsaw. He was arrested in Warsaw on 14 October but made a daring escape when he was brought to court five days later and hid out in Warsaw until he could be smuggled back via Danzig (Gdansk), to Warsaw. The 'three W's' had been ousted from the leadership as part of the power struggle that began during Lenin's terminal illness because of their links with Leon Trotsky. The new KPP leader Henryk Domski was an ally of the head of Comintern, Grigory Zinoviev.

When a rift opened up between Stalin and Zinoviev late in 1925, Lenski broke with Domski and backed Stalin, and for the next dozen years, he was the leading Stalinist in the KPP, though he had few supporters in the party, and took three years to establish his supremacy. He was elected to the Central Committee of the KPP in November 1925, and to the Politburo in 1926. He was General Secretary from June 1929 to June 1937, and a member of the executive committee of Comintern. In 1929–33, he was based in Berlin, directing the outlawed Polish Communist Party from there. When the Nazis seized power, he escaped to Copenhagen. Three years later, he settled in Paris. Though he completely subordinated the KPP to the Comintern, he was summoned by the Comintern from Paris to Moscow in June 1937, arriving on 17 June, and was arrested two days later by the NKVD. He was sentenced to death by the USSR Supreme Court on 21 September 1937, and executed the same day. (although, according to one source, he was imprisoned and died on 20 August 1939.

He was posthumously 'rehabilitated' on 29 April 1955.
