= Kalka (disambiguation) =

Kalka is a town in Haryana, India.

Kalka may also refer to:

- Khalkha Mongols, a Mongol ethnicity
- Kalka, South Australia
- Kalchyk (river) (modern name Kalchyk), a river in Ukraine
- Kalka, Pomeranian Voivodeship, a village in Kartuzy County, Poland
- Kałka, a village in Człuchów County, Poland
- Kalkaji Mandir, an ancient Kali temple in Kalkaji, Delhi, India
- Kalkaji Mandir metro station of the Delhi Metro
- Kalkaji Assembly constituency, a constituency of the Delhi Legislative Assembly
- Kalka Dass, Indian politician
- Kalka (1983 film), a 1983 Indian action film
- Kalka (1989 film), a 1989 Pakistani action film

== See also ==
- Battle of the Kalka River
