= Ciemino =

Ciemino may refer to the following places:

- Ciemino, Człuchów County in Pomeranian Voivodeship (north Poland)
- Ciemino, Słupsk County in Pomeranian Voivodeship (north Poland)
- Ciemino, West Pomeranian Voivodeship (north-west Poland)
