= Wilkowo =

Wilkowo may refer to the following places in Poland:

- Wilkowo, Lower Silesian Voivodeship (south-west Poland)
- Wilkowo, Kuyavian-Pomeranian Voivodeship (north-central Poland)
- Wilkowo, Masovian Voivodeship (east-central Poland)
- Wilkowo, Greater Poland Voivodeship (west-central Poland)
- Wilkowo, Lubusz Voivodeship (west Poland)
- Wilkowo, Człuchów County in Pomeranian Voivodeship (north Poland)
- Wilkowo, Kwidzyn County in Pomeranian Voivodeship (north Poland)
- Wilkowo, Elbląg County in Warmian-Masurian Voivodeship (north Poland)
- Wilkowo, Kętrzyn County in Warmian-Masurian Voivodeship (north Poland)
- Wilkowo, Olsztyn County in Warmian-Masurian Voivodeship (north Poland)
- Wilkowo, Węgorzewo County in Warmian-Masurian Voivodeship (north Poland)
