= Załęże (disambiguation) =

Załęże is a district of Katowice, Poland.

Załęże may also refer to:

- Załęże, Lesser Poland Voivodeship (south Poland)
- Załęże, Subcarpathian Voivodeship (south-east Poland)
- Załęże, Masovian Voivodeship (east-central Poland)
- Załęże, Silesian Voivodeship (south Poland)
- Załęże, Człuchów County in Pomeranian Voivodeship (north Poland)
- Załęże, Kartuzy County in Pomeranian Voivodeship (north Poland)
- Załęże, West Pomeranian Voivodeship (north-west Poland)
