= Dźwierzno, Człuchów County =

Dźwierzno
- Village
- Location within Poland
- Coordinates: 53°57′6″N 17°1′52″E
- Country: Poland
- Voivodeship: Pomeranian
- County: Człuchów
- Gmina: Koczała
- Population: 14

Dźwierzno [ˈd͡ʑvjɛʐnɔ] is a village in the administrative district of Gmina Koczała, within Człuchów County, Pomeranian Voivodeship, in northern Poland.

For details of the history of the region, see History of Pomerania.
