= Bielsk =

Bielsk may refer to:

- Bielsk, Kuyavian-Pomeranian Voivodeship (north-central Poland)
- Bielsk, Masovian Voivodeship (east-central Poland)
- Bielsk Podlaski in Podlaskie Voivodeship (north-east Poland)
- Bielsk, Pomeranian Voivodeship (north Poland)
- Bielsk County, an administrative district whose seat is Bielsk Podlaski
- Gmina Bielsk Podlaski, an administrative district within Bielsk County
- Gmina Bielsk, an administrative district whose seat is Bielsk, Masovian Voivodeship

== See also ==
- Bielsko-Biała, a city in Silesian Voivodeship, southern Poland
- Bielsko (disambiguation)
