= Stara Brda Pilska =

- Settlement
- Location within Poland
- Coordinates: 53°56′54″N 17°12′14″E
- Country: Poland
- Voivodeship: Pomeranian
- County: Człuchów
- Gmina: Koczała
- Population: 63

Stara Brda Pilska [ˈstara ˈbrda ˈpilska] is a settlement in the administrative district of Gmina Koczała, within Człuchów County, Pomeranian Voivodeship, in northern Poland.

For details of the history of the region, see History of Pomerania.
