= Starzno =

- Village
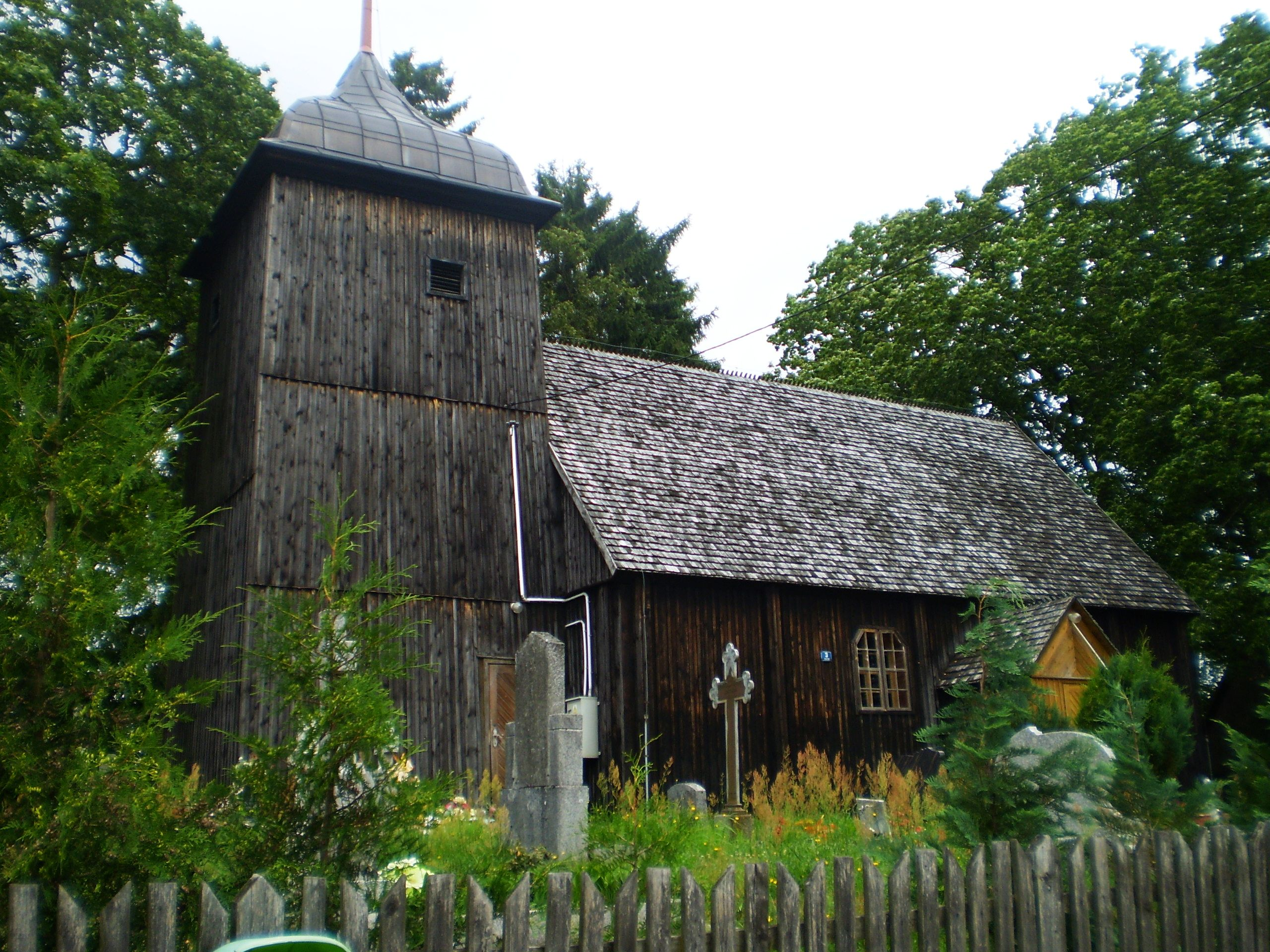
- Saint Nicholas church in Starzno

- Location within Poland
- Coordinates: 53°58′16″N 17°4′23″E
- Country: Poland
- Voivodeship: Pomeranian
- County: Człuchów
- Gmina: Koczała
- Population: 111
- Time zone: UTC+1 (CET)
  - Summer (DST): UTC+2 (CEST)
- Vehicle registration: GCZ

Starzno [ˈstaʐnɔ] (German: Starsen) is a village in the administrative district of Gmina Koczała, within Człuchów County, Pomeranian Voivodeship, in northern Poland. It is located within the historic region of Pomerania.

Starzno was a royal village of the Polish Crown, administratively located in the Człuchów County in the Pomeranian Voivodeship.
