= Trzyniec, Pomeranian Voivodeship =

Trzyniec
- Village
- Location within Poland
- Coordinates: 53°58′1″N 17°9′41″E
- Country: Poland
- Voivodeship: Pomeranian
- County: Człuchów
- Gmina: Koczała
- Population: 33

Trzyniec [ˈtʂɨɲɛt͡s] is a village in the administrative district of Gmina Koczała, within Człuchów County, Pomeranian Voivodeship, in northern Poland.

For details of the history of the region, see History of Pomerania.
