= Second Moscow Trial =

Show trial involving a group of former leaders of the All-Union Communist Party

The Second Moscow Trial (Russian: Второй московский процесс), officially the trial of the "Parallel Anti-Soviet Trotskyist Center" (Russian: проце́сс «Паралле́льного антисове́тского троцки́стского це́нтра»), was the second of the so-called Moscow Trials, a show trial involving a group of former leaders of the All-Union Communist Party (Bolsheviks) who had previously been active participants in the opposition.

The case was heard by the Military Collegium of the Supreme Court of the USSR from January 23 to January 30, 1937. The primary defendants were Georgy Pyatakov, Karl Radek, Leonid Serebryakov, and Grigory Sokolnikov. All the defendants were found guilty; 13 of them were sentenced to death by firing squad and executed two days later, while four were given various prison terms—though between 1939 and 1941, they too were either killed extrajudicially or executed following sentences handed down by the Military Collegium of the Supreme Court of the USSR. Between 1963 and 1988, all those convicted were rehabilitated on the grounds that their actions did not constitute a criminal offense.

== Investigation ==
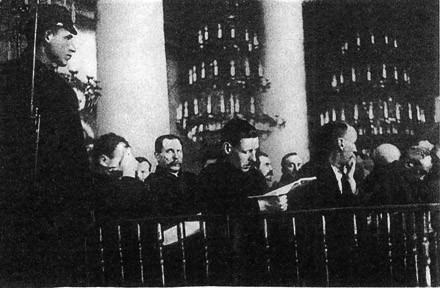
Defendants in the Second Moscow Trial during the court proceedings

Toward the end of the investigation into the "United Trotskyist-Zinovievite Center" case, some of the accused provided testimony alleging the existence of a "parallel" Trotskyist center, composed of former Trotskyists and members of the New Opposition—namely, Yu. L. Pyatakov, Karl Radek, L. P. Serebryakov and Sokolnikov. Pyatakov, Radek, and Serebryakov were soon arrested; Sokolnikov had been arrested earlier.

On September 30, 1936, Nikolai Yezhov was appointed People's Commissar for Internal Affairs of the USSR and took charge of the investigation. The primary directives for fabricating the case included a resolution by the Politburo of the Central Committee of the All-Union Communist Party (Bolsheviks) dated September 29, 1936—which stipulated that Trotskyists should be treated as intelligence agents, spies, saboteurs, and wreckers—as well as remarks made by Iosif Stalin on the interrogation protocol of Sokolnikov dated October 4, 1936. On a page of the protocol noting that Sokolnikov had not disclosed specific plans of his group to an English journalist, Stalin wrote: "But did he, after all, mention the plan to assassinate the leaders of the All-Union Communist Party (Bolsheviks)? Of course he did". On the final page of the protocol, which stated that Sokolnikov was unaware of the English journalist’s ties to British intelligence, Stalin wrote: "Sokolnikov, of course, provided Talbot with information about the USSR, the Central Committee, the Politburo, the GPU—about everything. Consequently, Sokolnikov was an informant (a spy/intelligence agent) for British intelligence". During the investigation, those arrested were accused of being members of an underground, anti-Soviet "parallel Trotskyist center" and of engaging in treasonous, subversive, sabotage-oriented, espionage, and terrorist activities as part of a Trotskyist organization within the Soviet Union. To create the appearance that a unified organization existed, the NKVD exploited the connections the detainees had formed during their time in the opposition, as well as their professional, personal, and familial ties.

Pyatakov and other members of the "parallel center" were also accused of orchestrating a terrorist act against V. M. Molotov, allegedly by taking advantage of an accidental car crash involving Molotov’s vehicle, which occurred on September 24, 1934, in Prokopyevsk.

== Course of the Trial. The Prosecution ==
On January 22, 1937, the Politburo of the Central Committee of the All-Union Communist Party (Bolsheviks) issued a resolution "On the Trial of Pyatakov, Radek, Sokolnikov, Serebryakov, et al.," which established the venue and composition of the court, the list of foreign correspondents, and other details regarding the upcoming trial.

On January 23, 1937, in Moscow, the Military Collegium of the Supreme Court—presided over by Army Military Jurist Vasiliy Ulrikh, with Corps Military Jurist Ivan Matulevich and Division Military Jurist Nikolay Rychkov as members, and Military Jurist First Rank Andrei Kostyushko serving as secretary—began hearing the case, with the participation of the Prosecutor of the USSR, Andrey Vyshinsky. The defendant Knyazev was represented by Ilya Braude, a member of the collegium of defense attorneys; the defendant Pushin by Nikolai Kommodov; and the defendant Arnold by S. K. Kaznacheyev. The remaining defendants declined legal counsel, stating that they would represent themselves..

On these grounds, the following individuals were charged for having been members of an anti-Soviet underground Trotskyist center and having committed crimes under Articles 58-1a, 58-8, 58-9, and 58-11 of the Criminal Code of the RSFSR:

- Georgy Pyatakov
- Grigory Sokolnikov
- Karl Radek
- Leonid Serebryakov.

Also charged were for having been active members of the same anti-Soviet underground Trotskyist organization and having committed crimes under Articles 58-1a, 58-8, 58-9, and 58-11 of the Criminal Code of the RSFSR:

- Yakov Livshits
- Nikolay Muralov
- Yakov Drobnis
- Mikhail Boguslavsky
- Ivan Knyazev
- Stanislav Rataychak
- Boris Norkin
- Aleksey Shestov
- Mikhail Stroilov
- Iosif Turok
- Ivan Grashe
- Gavriil Pushin
- Valentin Arnold [3].

During the trial, the defendants provided confessions and also gave testimony against N. I. Bukharin and A. I. Rykov.

== The Verdict ==
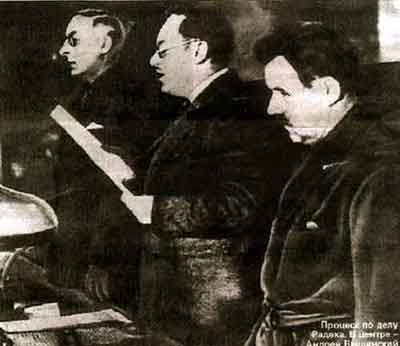
Vyshinsky (centre), reading the indictment, in 1937

On January 30, 1937, the Military Collegium of the Supreme Court of the USSR handed down its verdict. All 17 defendants were found guilty. Thirteen individuals, including G. Pyatakov and L. Serebryakov, were sentenced to death. Radek, Sokolnikov, and V. Arnold were sentenced to 10 years in prison, while M. Stroilov received an 8-year prison sentence. The verdict also stipulated that L. D. Trotsky and his son, L. L. Sedov, were to be arrested immediately and brought to trial before the Military Collegium of the Supreme Court of the USSR should they be discovered within the territory of the USSR.

== Fate of the Convicted ==
On February 1, 1937, the 13 individuals sentenced to death were executed by firing squad.

The four defendants whose lives had been spared did not outlive the others by long. In May 1939, Radek and Sokolnikov were killed while in custody, on the orders of the People's Commissar for Internal Affairs of the USSR, Lavrenty Beria, and his deputy, Bogdan Kobulov.

Stroilov and Arnold were executed by firing squad in September 1941—along with a group of other inmates at the Oryol Prison—pursuant to a verdict issued in absentia by the Military Collegium of the Supreme Court of the Soviet Union on September 8, 1941. This action was taken in accordance with State Defense Committee Resolution No. GKO-634ss, signed by Stalin on September 6, 1941.

== Rehabilitation ==
By a ruling of the Military Collegium of the Supreme Court of the USSR dated June 18, 1963, I. A. Knyazev, I. D. Turok, I. I. Grashe, B. O. Norkin, and G. E. Pushin were rehabilitated. By a resolution of the Plenum of the Supreme Court of the USSR dated April 17, 1986, N. I. Muralov was rehabilitated. By a resolution of the Plenum of the Supreme Court of the USSR dated December 4, 1986, L. P. Serebryakov was rehabilitated. By a resolution of the Plenum of the Supreme Court of the USSR dated September 23, 1987, M. S. Boguslavsky was rehabilitated. In a resolution dated June 13, 1988, the Plenum of the Supreme Court of the USSR overturned the verdict of the Military Collegium regarding Yu. L. Pyatakov, Ya. A. Livshits, Ya. N. Drobnis, S. A. Rataychak, A. A. Shestov, Sokolnikov, K. B. Radek, and V. V. Arnold, and terminated the case on the grounds that their actions did not constitute a criminal offense. It was established that the charges brought against all these individuals were groundless and that the case materials had been fabricated. Furthermore, no such entity as a "parallel anti-Soviet Trotskyist center" had ever existed.
