= Pietrzykówko =

- Settlement
- Location within Poland
- Coordinates: 53°58′25″N 17°7′41″E
- Country: Poland
- Voivodeship: Pomeranian
- County: Człuchów
- Gmina: Koczała

Pietrzykówko [pjɛtʂɨˈkufkɔ] (German: Klein Peterkau) is a settlement in the administrative district of Gmina Koczała, within Człuchów County, Pomeranian Voivodeship, in northern Poland.

For details of the history of the region, see History of Pomerania.
