= Gmina Koczała =

Gmina Koczała Koczała Commune
- Gmina
- Flag Coat of arms
- Interactive map of Gmina Koczała
- Coordinates (Koczała): 53°54′8″N 17°3′59″E
- Country: Poland
- Voivodeship: Pomeranian
- County: Człuchów
- Seat: Koczała

Area
  - Total: 222.41 km^{2} (85.87 sq mi)

Population (2006)
  - Total: 3,481
  - Density: 15.65/km^{2} (40.54/sq mi)
- Website: http://www.koczala.pl

Gmina Koczała is a rural gmina (administrative district) in Człuchów County, Pomeranian Voivodeship, in northern Poland. Its seat is the village of Koczała, which lies approximately 35 kilometres (22 mi) north-west of Człuchów and 115 km (71 mi) south-west of the regional capital Gdańsk.

The gmina covers an area of 222.41 square kilometres (85.9 sq mi), and as of 2006 its total population is 3,481.

== Villages ==
Gmina Koczała contains the villages and settlements of Adamki, Bielsko, Bryle, Ciemino, Dymin, Działek, Dźwierzeński Młyn, Dźwierzno, Kałka, Koczała, Łękinia, Niedźwiady, Niesiłowo, Ostrówek, Pietrzykówko, Pietrzykowo, Płocicz, Podlesie, Potoki, Stara Brda, Stara Brda Pilska, Starzno, Strużka, Świerkówko, Trzyniec, Wilkowo, Zagaje, Załęże, Zapadłe and Żukowo.

== Neighbouring gminas ==
Gmina Koczała is bordered by the gminas of Biały Bór, Lipnica, Miastko, Przechlewo and Rzeczenica.
