= Niedźwiady, Pomeranian Voivodeship =

Niedźwiady
- Settlement
- Location within Poland
- Coordinates: 53°53′27″N 17°8′54″E
- Country: Poland
- Voivodeship: Pomeranian
- County: Człuchów
- Gmina: Koczała
- Population: 32

Niedźwiady ([ɲɛd͡ʑˈvjadɨ]) is a settlement in the administrative district of Gmina Koczała, within Człuchów County, Pomeranian Voivodeship, in northern Poland.

For details of the history of the region, see History of Pomerania.
