= Strużka, Człuchów County =

Strużka
- Settlement
- Location within Poland
- Coordinates: 53°51′20″N 17°4′31″E
- Country: Poland
- Voivodeship: Pomeranian
- County: Człuchów
- Gmina: Koczała

Strużka [ˈstruʂka] is a settlement in the administrative district of Gmina Koczała, within Człuchów County, Pomeranian Voivodeship, in northern Poland.

For details of the history of the region, see History of Pomerania.
