= Zapadłe, Człuchów County =

Zapadłe
- Village
- Location within Poland
- Coordinates: 53°57′2″N 17°10′36″E
- Country: Poland
- Voivodeship: Pomeranian
- County: Człuchów
- Gmina: Koczała
- Population: 21

Zapadłe [zaˈpadwɛ] is a village in the administrative district of Gmina Koczała, within Człuchów County, Pomeranian Voivodeship, in northern Poland.

For details of the history of the region, see History of Pomerania.
