= Bielsko (disambiguation) =

Bielsko is a former town in southern Poland, now part of Bielsko-Biała.

Bielsko may also refer to:

- Bielsko County (powiat bielski)
- Bielsko, Lublin Voivodeship (east Poland)
- Bielsko, Międzychód County in Greater Poland Voivodeship (west-central Poland)
- Bielsko, Słupca County in Greater Poland Voivodeship (west-central Poland)
- Bielsko, Pomeranian Voivodeship (north Poland)
