= Dźwierzeński Młyn =

- Settlement
- Location within Poland
- Coordinates: 53°58′14″N 17°1′19″E
- Country: Poland
- Voivodeship: Pomeranian
- County: Człuchów
- Gmina: Koczała
- Population: 0

Dźwierzeński Młyn [d͡ʑvjɛˈʐɛɲski ˈmwɨn] is a former settlement in the administrative district of Gmina Koczała, within Człuchów County, Pomeranian Voivodeship, in northern Poland. For details of the history of the region, see History of Pomerania.
