= Dymin, Pomeranian Voivodeship =

Dymin
- Village
- Location within Poland
- Coordinates: 53°55′41″N 17°2′56″E
- Country: Poland
- Voivodeship: Pomeranian
- County: Człuchów
- Gmina: Koczała

Population
  - Total: 36
- Time zone: UTC+1 (CET)
  - Summer (DST): UTC+2 (CEST)
- Vehicle registration: GCZ

Dymin [ˈdɨmin] (German: Am Diemensee) is a village in the administrative district of Gmina Koczała, within Człuchów County, Pomeranian Voivodeship, in northern Poland.

It is situated on the western shore of Dymno Lake in the historic region of Pomerania.
