= Żukowo, Człuchów County =

Żukowo
- Village
- Location within Poland
- Coordinates: 53°49′48″N 17°3′48″E
- Country: Poland
- Voivodeship: Pomeranian
- County: Człuchów
- Gmina: Koczała
- Population: 6

Żukowo [ʐuˈkɔvɔ] is a village in the administrative district of Gmina Koczała, within Człuchów County, Pomeranian Voivodeship, in northern Poland.

For details of the history of the region, see History of Pomerania.
