= Płocicz, Pomeranian Voivodeship =

Płocicz
- Village
- Location within Poland
- Coordinates: 53°51′29″N 17°4′23″E
- Country: Poland
- Voivodeship: Pomeranian
- County: Człuchów
- Gmina: Koczała
- Population: 43

Płocicz [ˈpwɔt͡ɕit͡ʂ] is a village in the administrative district of Gmina Koczała, within Człuchów County, Pomeranian Voivodeship, in northern Poland.

For details of the history of the region, see History of Pomerania.
