= Działek =

- Village
- Location within Poland
- Coordinates: 53°54′39″N 17°6′27″E
- Country: Poland
- Voivodeship: Pomeranian
- County: Człuchów
- Gmina: Koczała
- Population: 62

Działek [ˈd͡ʑawɛk] is a village in the administrative district of Gmina Koczała, within Człuchów County, Pomeranian Voivodeship, in northern Poland.

For details of the history of the region, see History of Pomerania.
