= Koczała =

- Village
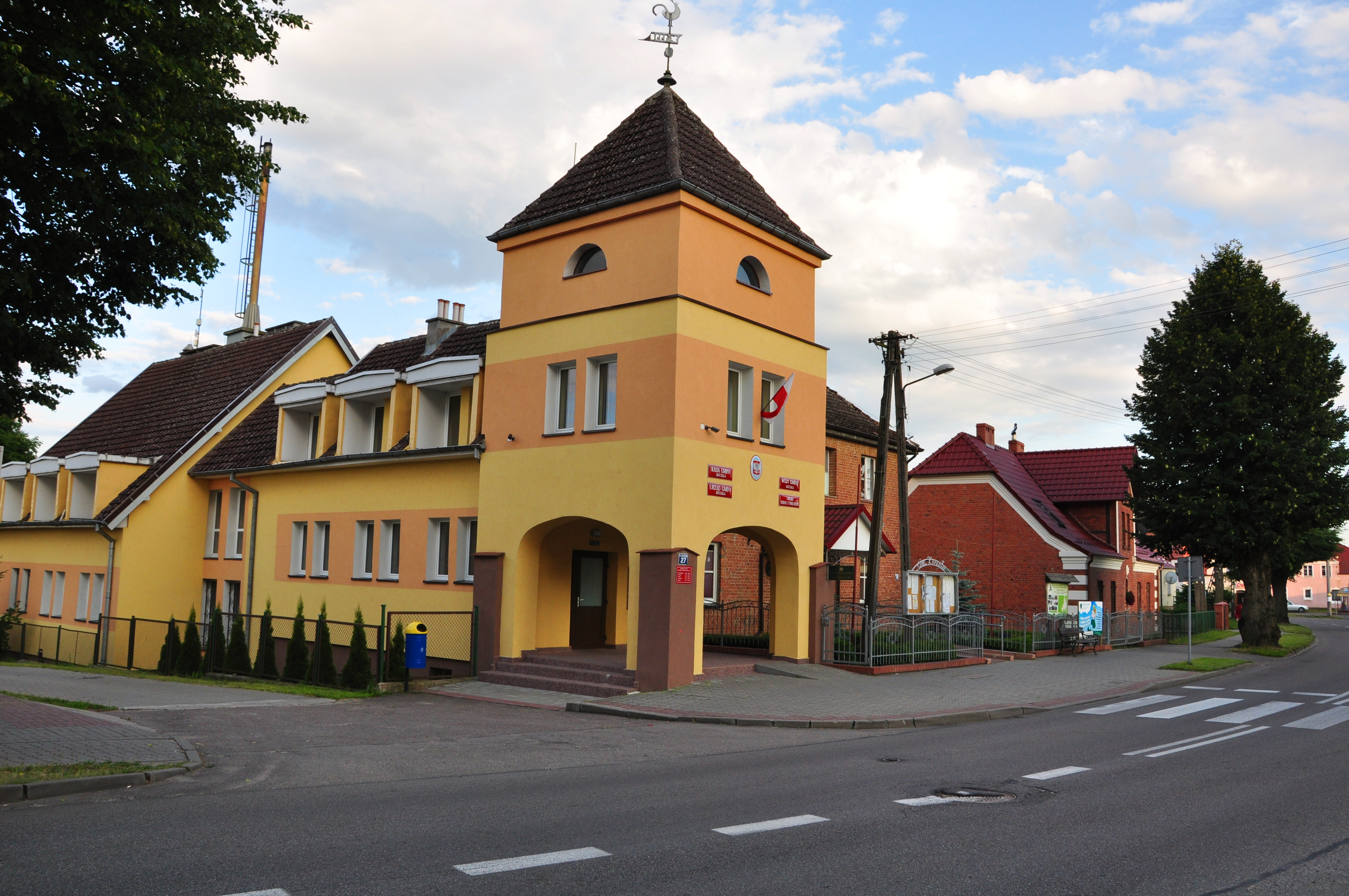
- Gmina Office in Koczała

- Location within Poland
- Coordinates: 53°54′8″N 17°3′59″E
- Country: Poland
- Voivodeship: Pomeranian
- County: Człuchów
- Gmina: Koczała
- Population: 2,111
- Time zone: UTC+1 (CET)
  - Summer (DST): UTC+2 (CEST)

Koczała [kɔˈt͡ʂawa] (German: Flötenstein) is a village in Człuchów County, Pomeranian Voivodeship, in northern Poland. It is the seat of the gmina (administrative district) called Gmina Koczała. It is located within the historic region of Pomerania.

Koczała was a royal village of the Polish Crown, administratively located in the Człuchów County in the Pomeranian Voivodeship. During World War II the German Nazi administration operated a labor camp for prisoners of war from the Stalag II-B prisoner-of-war camp in the village.
