= Zagaje, Pomeranian Voivodeship =

Zagaje
- Settlement
- Location within Poland
- Coordinates: 54°0′22″N 17°7′41″E
- Country: Poland
- Voivodeship: Pomeranian
- County: Człuchów
- Gmina: Koczała
- Population: 14

Zagaje [zaˈɡajɛ] is a settlement in the administrative district of Gmina Koczała, within Człuchów County, Pomeranian Voivodeship, in northern Poland.

For details of the history of the region, see History of Pomerania.
