= Pietrzykowo, Pomeranian Voivodeship =

Pietrzykowo
- Village
- Location within Poland
- Coordinates: 53°59′18″N 17°9′17″E
- Country: Poland
- Voivodeship: Pomeranian
- County: Człuchów
- Gmina: Koczała
- Population: 151

Pietrzykowo [pjɛtʂɨˈkɔvɔ] (German: Groß Peterkau) is a village in the administrative district of Gmina Koczała, within Człuchów County, Pomeranian Voivodeship, in northern Poland.

For details of the history of the region, see History of Pomerania.
