= Załęże, Człuchów County =

Załęże
- Village
- Location within Poland
- Coordinates: 53°55′18″N 17°8′42″E
- Country: Poland
- Voivodeship: Pomeranian
- County: Człuchów
- Gmina: Koczała
- Population: 78

Załęże [zaˈwɛ̃ʐɛ] is a village in the administrative district of Gmina Koczała, within Człuchów County, Pomeranian Voivodeship, in northern Poland.

For details of the history of the region, see History of Pomerania.
