= Bielsko, Pomeranian Voivodeship =

Bielsko
- Village
- Location within Poland
- Coordinates: 53°52′9″N 17°7′15″E
- Country: Poland
- Voivodeship: Pomeranian
- County: Człuchów
- Gmina: Koczała
- Population: 471

Bielsko [ˈbjɛlskɔ] (German: Bölzig) is a village in the administrative district of Gmina Koczała, within Człuchów County, Pomeranian Voivodeship, in northern Poland.

== See also ==
History of Pomerania
