= Ciemino, Człuchów County =

Ciemino
- Settlement
- Location within Poland
- Coordinates: 53°59′24″N 17°6′58″E
- Country: Poland
- Voivodeship: Pomeranian
- County: Człuchów
- Gmina: Koczała
- Population: 23

Ciemino [t͡ɕɛˈminɔ] is a settlement in the administrative district of Gmina Koczała, within Człuchów County, Pomeranian Voivodeship, in northern Poland.

For details of the history of the region, see History of Pomerania.
