= Karl Radek =

Polish revolutionary (1885–1939)

- Карл Радек
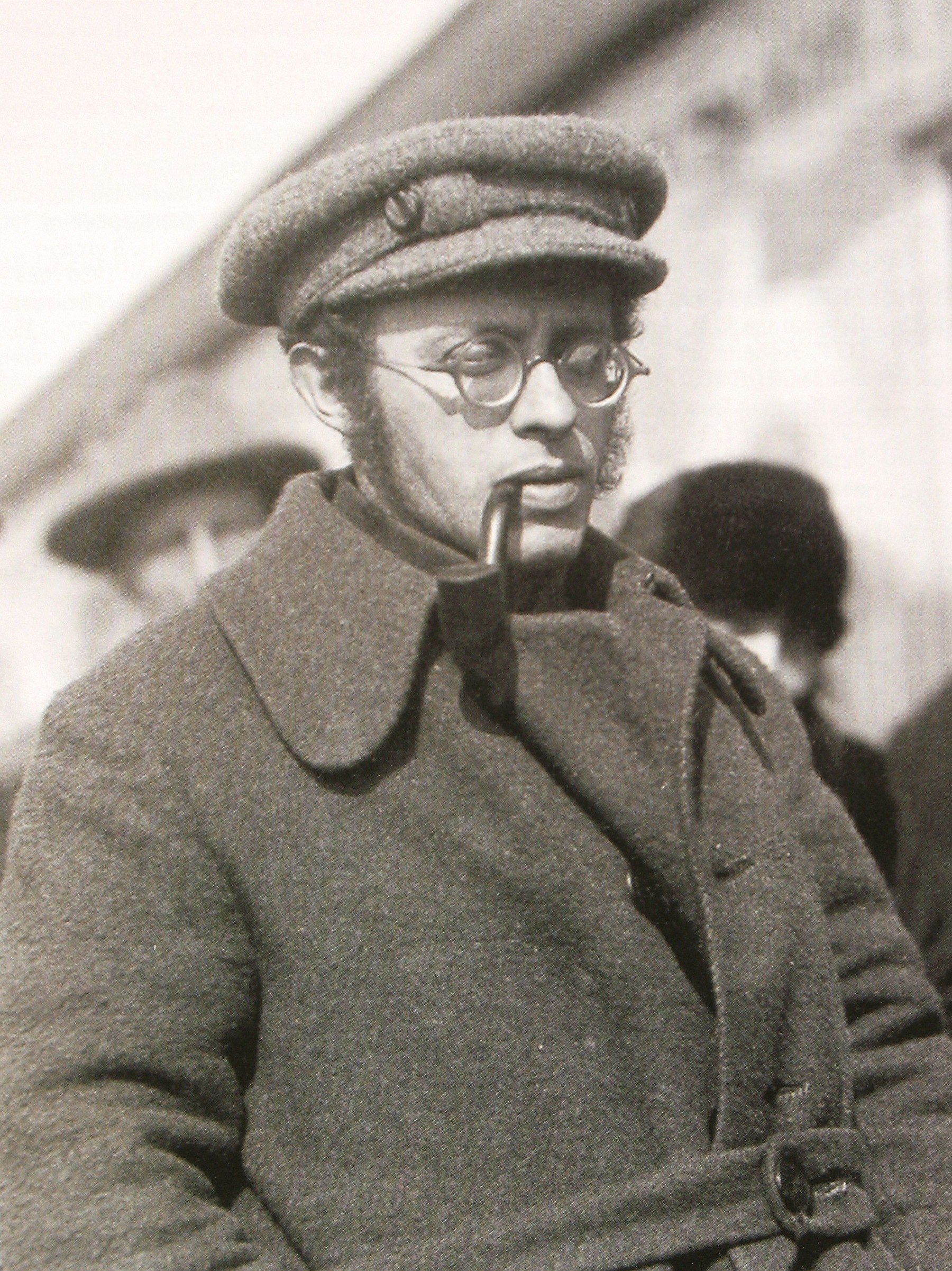
- Radek c. 1920s

Vice Commissar for Foreign Affairs of the Russian SFSR
- In office c. November 1917 – c. February 1919
- Commissar: Leon Trotsky; Georgy Chicherin
- Preceded by: Office established

Personal details
- Born: Karol Sobelsohn; 31 October 1885 Lemberg, Austria-Hungary
- Died: 19 May 1939 (aged 53) Verkhneuralsk, Russian SFSR, Soviet Union
- Citizenship: Russian Empire; Soviet Union
- Party: SDKPiL (1904–1907); SPD (1907–1912); RCP(b) (1917–1927, 1930–1937)
- Other political affiliations: KPD (1919–1923); Left Opposition (1923–1928)
- Spouses: Rosa Mavrikievna Radek, Larissa Mikhailovna Reissner
- Children: Sofia Karlovna Radek
- Education: Jagiellonian University
- Occupation: Revolutionary; writer; journalist; publicist; politician; theorist
- Known for: Marxist revolutionary activism
- Central institution membership: 1919–1924: Full member, 8th–12th Central Committee of RCP(b)

Karl Berngardovich Radek (Russian: Карл Бернгардович Радек; Polish: Karol Radek; 31 October 1885 – 19 May 1939) was a revolutionary and writer active in the Polish and German social democratic movements before World War I and a Communist International leader in the Soviet Union after the Russian Revolution.

Radek was born to a Jewish family in Lemberg, Austria-Hungary. He joined the Social Democracy of the Kingdom of Poland and Lithuania and took part in the 1905 Russian Revolution in Congress Poland. Two years later he was forced to flee to Germany, where he worked as a journalist for the Social Democratic Party of Germany. After the outbreak of World War I, Radek relocated to Switzerland and became an associate of Vladimir Lenin. Following the February Revolution, Radek helped organize the return of Lenin and other Russian revolutionaries to Russia, though he himself was denied entry until after the October Revolution. As Vice-Commissar for Foreign Affairs, he took part in the negotiations of the Treaty of Brest-Litovsk. He helped establish the Communist Party of Germany after the revolution began, and spent a year in prison for his role in the Spartacist uprising.

After returning to Russia, Radek became a member of the Comintern Executive Committee. The failure of the revolution in Germany, as well as his support for Leon Trotsky against Joseph Stalin, ultimately led to his fall from power and expulsion from the Party. He later recanted his views and was re-admitted to the Party. Nevertheless, during the Great Purge Radek was accused of treason and arrested. He was found guilty as a chief defendant at the Second Moscow Trial in 1937 and sentenced to 10 years of penal labour. He died in Verkhneuralsk Political Isolator labour camp in the Urals two years later.

== Early life ==
Radek was born Karol Sobelsohn in Lemberg in Austria-Hungary (present-day Lviv, Ukraine) to a Litvak (Lithuanian Jewish) family; his father, Bernhard, worked in the post office and died whilst Karl was young. He took the name Radek from a favourite character, Andrzej Radek, in Syzyfowe prace ('The Labors of Sisyphus', 1897) by Stefan Żeromski.

Radek joined the Social Democracy of the Kingdom of Poland and Lithuania (SDKPiL) in 1904. When the 1905 Russian Revolution broke out (including uprisings across the Kingdom of Poland), Radek participated as a revolutionary organiser in Warsaw, where he had responsibility for the party's newspaper Czerwony Sztandar.

== Germany and "the Radek Affair" ==
In 1907, after his arrest in Poland and his escape from custody, Radek moved to Leipzig in Germany and joined the Social Democratic Party of Germany (SPD), working on the Party's Leipziger Volkszeitung. He re-located to Bremen, where he worked for Bremer Bürgerzeitung, in 1911, and was one of several who attacked Karl Kautsky's analysis of imperialism in Die Neue Zeit in May 1912.

In September 1910, Radek was accused by members of the Polish Socialist Party of stealing books, clothes and money from party comrades, as part of an anti-semitic campaign against the SDKPiL. On this occasion, he was vigorously defended by the SDKPiL leaders, Rosa Luxemburg and Leo Jogiches. The following year, however, the SDKPiL changed its course, partly because of a personality clash between Jogiches and Vladimir Lenin, during which younger members of the party, led by Yakov Hanecki, and including Radek, had sided with Lenin. Wanting to make an example of Radek, Jogiches revived the charges of theft, and convened a party commission in December 1911 to investigate. He dissolved the commission in July 1912, after it had failed to come to any conclusion, and in August pushed a decision through the party court expelling Radek. In their written finding, they revealed his alias, making it — he claimed — dangerous for him to stay in Russian occupied Poland.

In 1912 August Thalheimer invited Radek to go to Göppingen (near Stuttgart) to temporarily replace him in control of the local SPD party newspaper Freie Volkszeitung, which had financial difficulties. Radek accused the local party leadership in Württemberg of assisting revisionists to strangle the newspaper due to the paper's hostility to them. The 1913 SPD Congress noted Radek's expulsion and then went on to decide in principle that no-one who had been expelled from a sister-party could join another party within the Second International and retrospectively applied this rule to Radek. Within the SPD Anton Pannekoek and Karl Liebknecht opposed this move, as did others in the International such as Leon Trotsky and Vladimir Lenin, some of whom participated in the "Paris Commission" set up by the International.

== World War I and the Russian Revolution ==
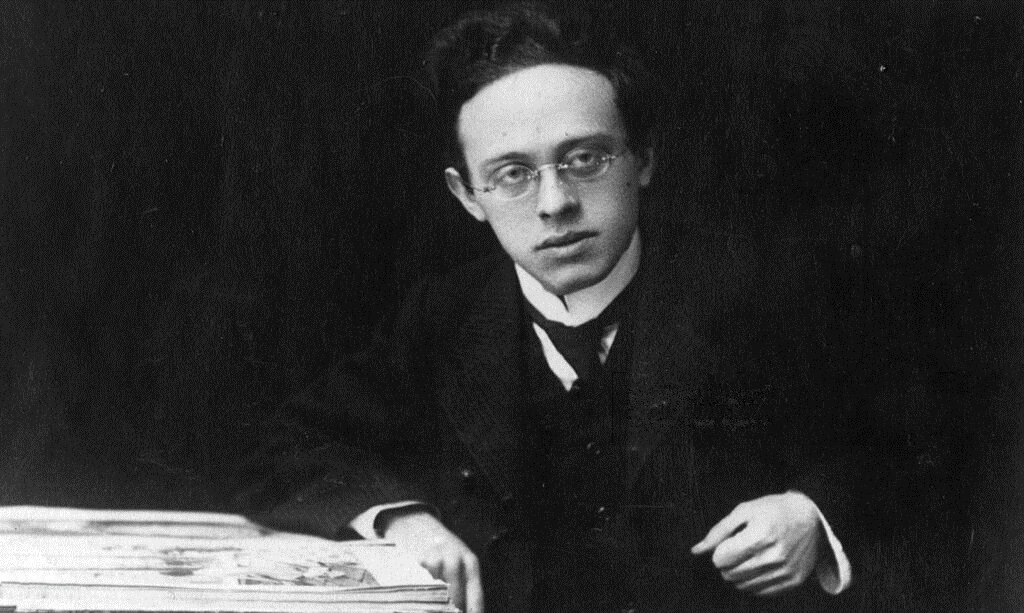
Karl Radek in 1919

After the outbreak of World War I Radek moved to Switzerland where he worked as a liaison between Lenin and the Bremen Left, with whom he had close links from his time in Germany, introducing him to Paul Levi at this time. He took part in the Zimmerwald Conference in 1915, siding with the left.

During World War I, Radek engaged in polemics with Vladimir Lenin over the subject of the Irish Easter Rising of 1916; while Lenin was strongly enthusiastic about the Rising, seeing it as a blow to British imperialism, Radek disagreed. Basing his view on Theodore Rothstein, he claimed that, what he called the "Sinn Féin movement" was petit-bourgeois and that the backbone of earlier rebellions in Ireland, the peasant farmer, had been placated at the start of the century by the British government. In his article The End of a Song, Radek claimed efforts to restore the Irish language to official status were flawed because it was "medieval". Leon Trotsky held a view halfway between Radek and Lenin.

In 1917 Radek was one of the passengers on the sealed train that carried Lenin and other Russian revolutionaries through Germany after the February Revolution in Russia. However, he was refused entry to Russia and went on to Stockholm, where he produced German-language versions of Bolshevik documents and other information translated from Russian, which he published in the journals Russische Korrespondenz-Pravda and Bote der Russischen Revolution.

After the October Revolution and the onset of the Russian Civil War, Radek arrived in Petrograd and became Vice-Commissar for Foreign Affairs, taking part in the Brest-Litovsk treaty negotiations, as well as being responsible for distribution of Bolshevik propaganda amongst German troops and prisoners of war. During the discussions around signing the treaty, Radek was one of the advocates of a revolutionary war.

== Comintern and the German Revolution ==
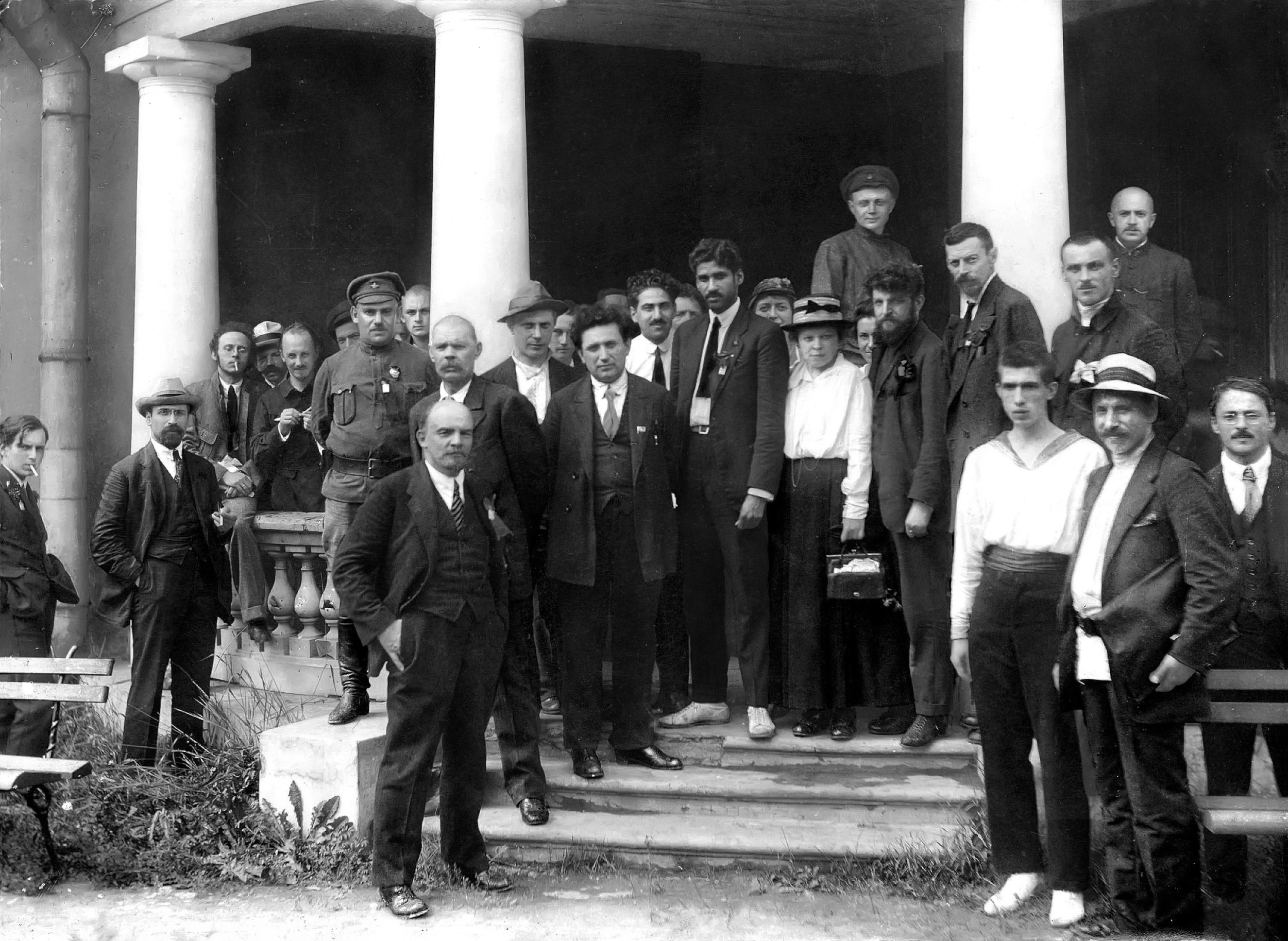
Karl Radek (3rd from the left) at the 2nd World Congress of the Comintern, Moscow, 1920

After being refused recognition as an official representative of the Bolshevik regime, Radek and other delegates—Adolph Joffe, Nikolai Bukharin, Christian Rakovsky and Ignatov—traveled to the German Congress of Soviets. After they were turned back at the border, Radek alone crossed the German border illegally in December 1918, arriving in Berlin on 19 or 20 December, where he participated in discussions and conferences leading to foundation of the Communist Party of Germany (KPD). Radek was arrested after the Spartacist uprising on 12 February 1919 and held in Moabit Prison until his release in January 1920. While he was in Moabit, the attitude of the German authorities towards the Bolsheviks changed. The idea of creating an alliance of nations that had suffered from the Versailles treaty—principally Germany, Russia and Turkey—gained currency in Berlin, as a result of which Radek was allowed to receive a stream of visitors in his prison cell, including Walter Rathenau, Arthur Holitscher, Enver Pasha, and Ruth Fischer.

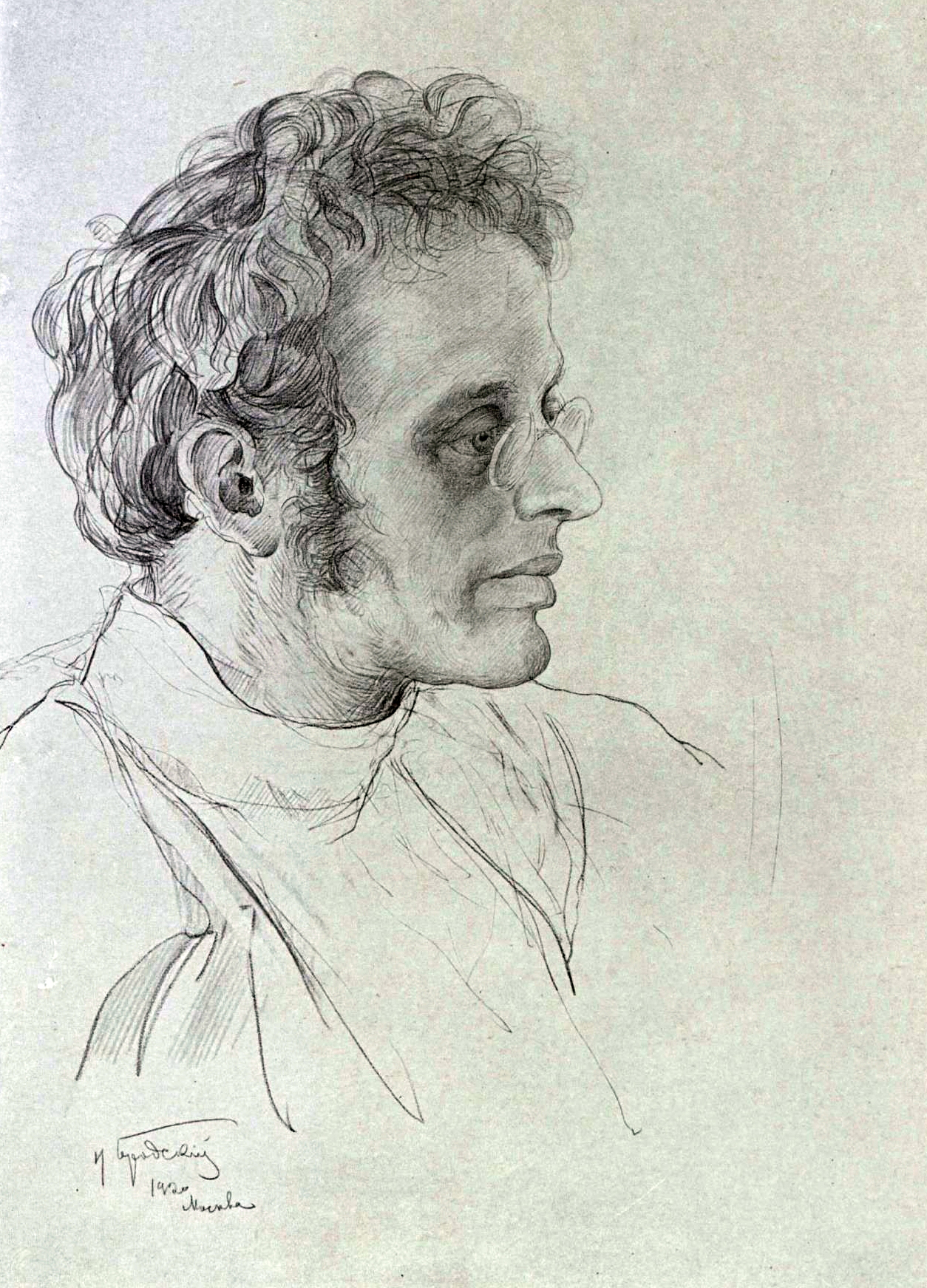
Portrait by Isaak Brodsky, 1920

On his return to Russia Radek became the Secretary of the Comintern, taking the main responsibility for German issues. He was removed from this position after he supported the KPD in opposing inviting representatives of the Communist Workers' Party of Germany to attend the 2nd Congress of the Comintern, pitting him against the Comintern's executive and the Communist Party of the Soviet Union. It was Radek who took up the slogan of Stuttgart communists of fighting for a united front with other working-class organisations, that later formed the basis for the strategy developed by the Comintern. In 1922, Radek sent Henk Sneevliet to China to advocate for what later became the First United Front.

In mid-1923, Radek made his controversial speech 'Leo Schlageter: The Wanderer into the Void' at an open session of the Executive Committee of the Communist International (ECCI). In the speech he praised the actions of the German Freikorps officer Leo Schlageter, who had recently been executed for engaging in sabotage against French troops occupying the Ruhr area. In doing so Radek sought to explain the reasons why men like Schlageter were drawn towards the far left, and attempted to channel national grievances away from chauvinism and towards support of the working movement and the Communists.

Although Radek was not at Chemnitz when the decision to cancel the uprising in November 1923 took place at the KPD Zentrale, he subsequently approved the decision and defended it.

At subsequent congresses of the Russian Communist Party and meetings of the ECCI, Radek and Brandler were made the scapegoats for the defeat of the revolution by Zinoviev, with Radek being removed from the ECCI at the Fifth Congress of the Comintern.

== Into the Left Opposition ==
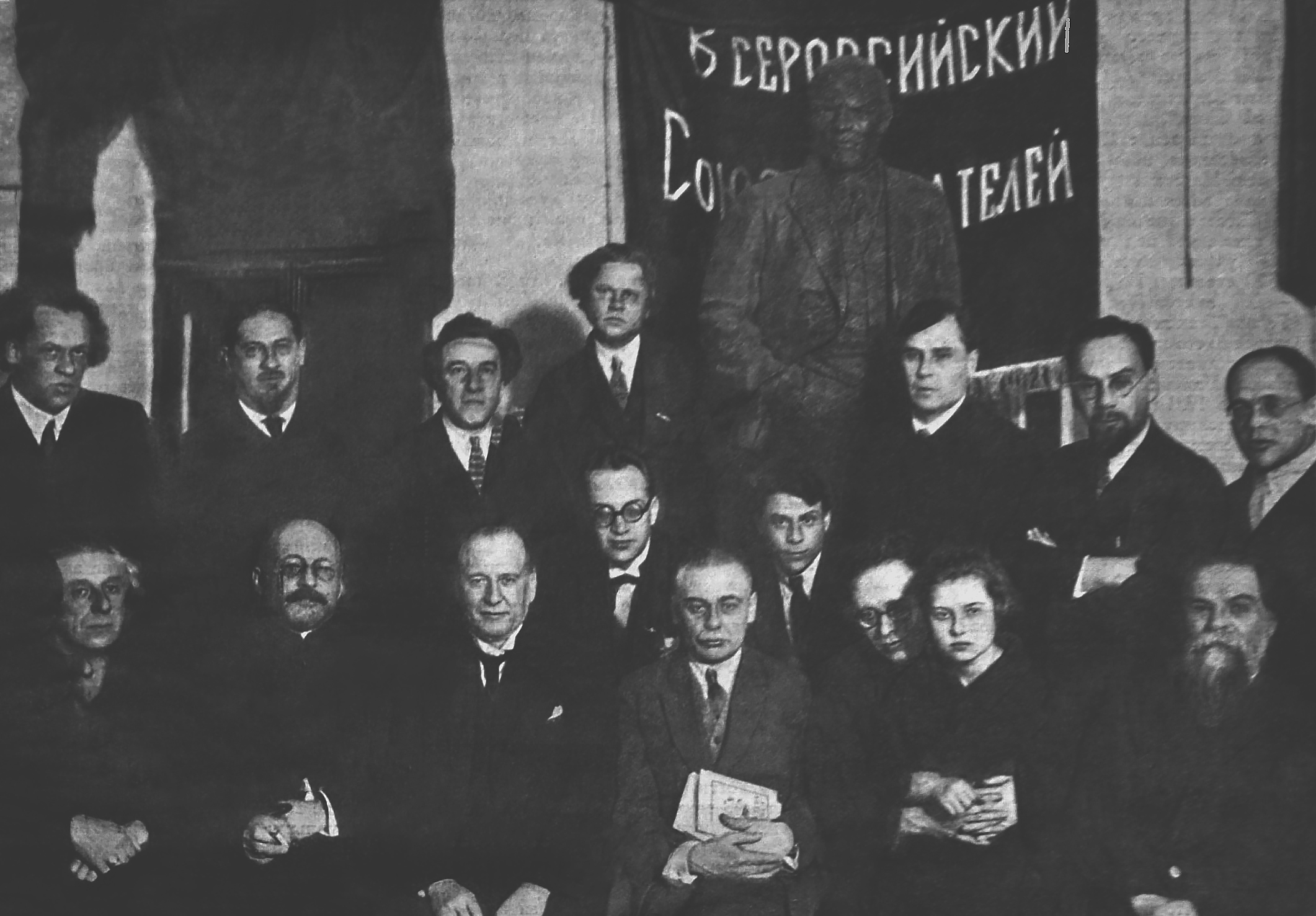
Karl Radek (holding Aleksandr Voronsky's daughter) among the writers of Krasnaya Nov

Radek was part of the Left Opposition from 1923, writing his article 'Leon Trotsky: Organizer of Victory' shortly after Lenin's stroke in January of that year. Later in the year at the Thirteenth Party Congress Radek was removed from the Central Committee.

In the summer of 1925, Radek was appointed Provost of the newly established Sun Yat-Sen University in Moscow, where he collected information for the opposition from students about the situation in China and cautiously began to challenge the official Comintern policy. However, the terminal illness of Radek's lover, Larissa Reissner, saw Radek lose his inhibitions and he began publicly criticising Stalin, in particular debating Stalin's doctrine of Socialism in One Country at the Communist Academy. Radek was sacked from his post at Sun Yat-Sen University in May 1927.

Radek was expelled from the Party in 1927 after helping to organise an independent demonstration on the 10th anniversary of the October Revolution with Grigory Zinoviev in Leningrad.In early 1928, when prominent oppositionists were deported to various remote locations within the Soviet Union, Radek was sent to Tobolsk and a few months later moved on to Tomsk.

== After the Opposition and Show Trials ==
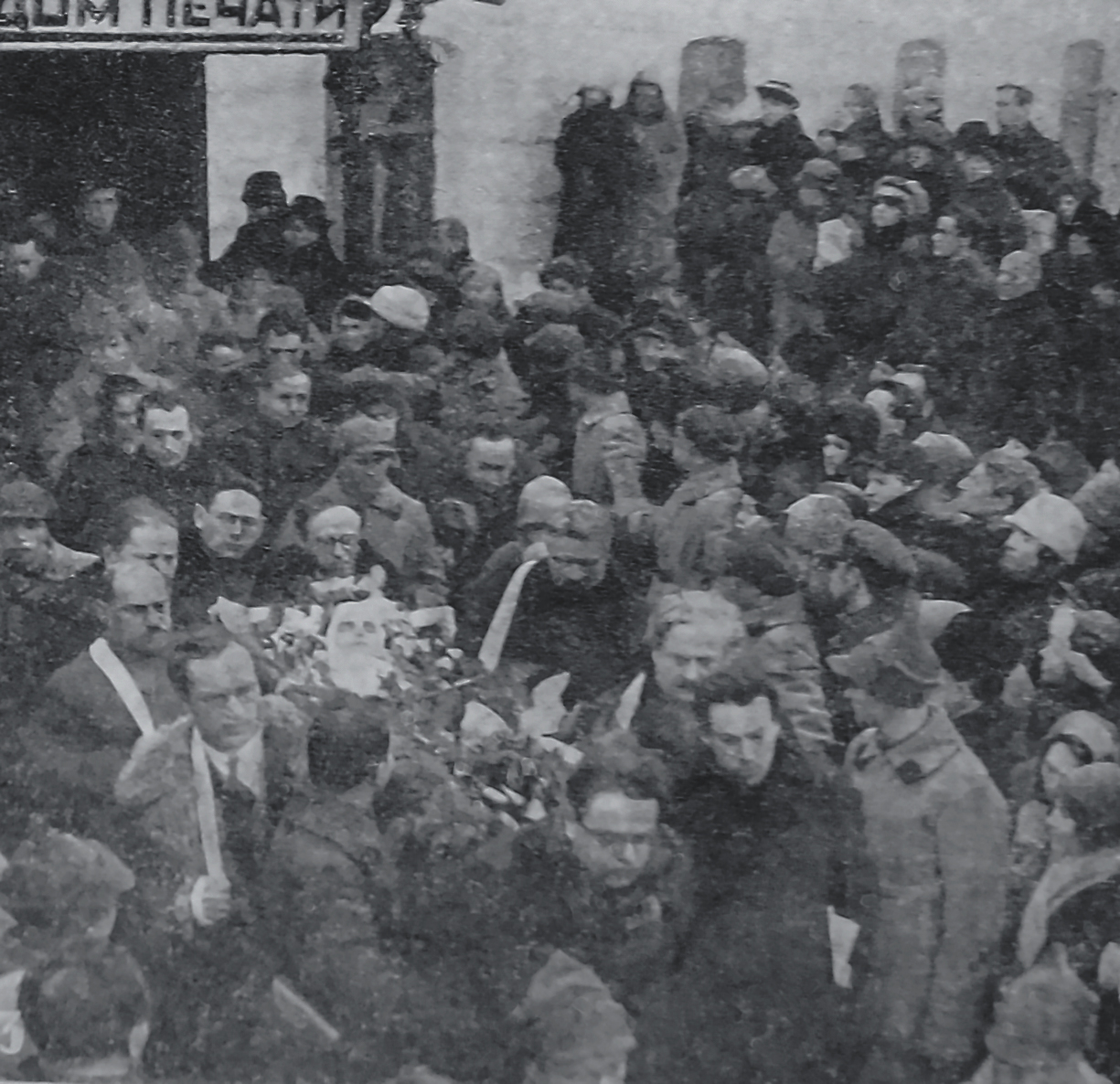
Karl Radek attends the funeral of his wife, the Soviet revolutionary leader Larissa Reissner

On 10 July 1929, Radek, alongside other Ivar Smilga and Yevgeni Preobrazhensky, signed a document capitulating to Stalin, with Radek being held in particular disdain by oppositionist circles for his betrayal of Yakov Blumkin, who had been carrying a secret letter from Trotsky, in exile in Turkey, to Radek. However, he was re-admitted in 1930 and was one of the few former oppositionists to retain a prominent place within the party, heading the International Information Bureau of the Russian Communist Party Central Committee as well as giving the address on foreign literature at the First Conference of the Union of Soviet Writers in 1934. In that speech, he denounced Marcel Proust and James Joyce. He said that "in the pages of Proust, the old world, like a mangy dog no longer capable of any action whatever, lies basking in the sun and endlessly licks its sores" and compared Joyce's Ulysses to "a heap of dung, crawling with worms, photographed by a cinema apparatus through a microscope."

Later in his life he adopted a position that the Soviet government should be close to Germany. In 1934 he was interviewed by a German politician, at which both of them deplored the hostile drift of their respective governments, and Radek made a controversial remark: "There are some fine lads in the SA and SS." In 1936 he congratulated General Ernst Köstring on the day Germany occupied the Rhineland, along with Mikhail Tukhachevsky. He helped to write the 1936 Soviet Constitution but, during the Great Purge of the 1930s, he was accused of treason and confessed, after two and a half months of interrogation, at the Trial of the Seventeen in 1937, the so-called Second Moscow Trial. He was sentenced to 10 years of penal labor.

=== Death ===
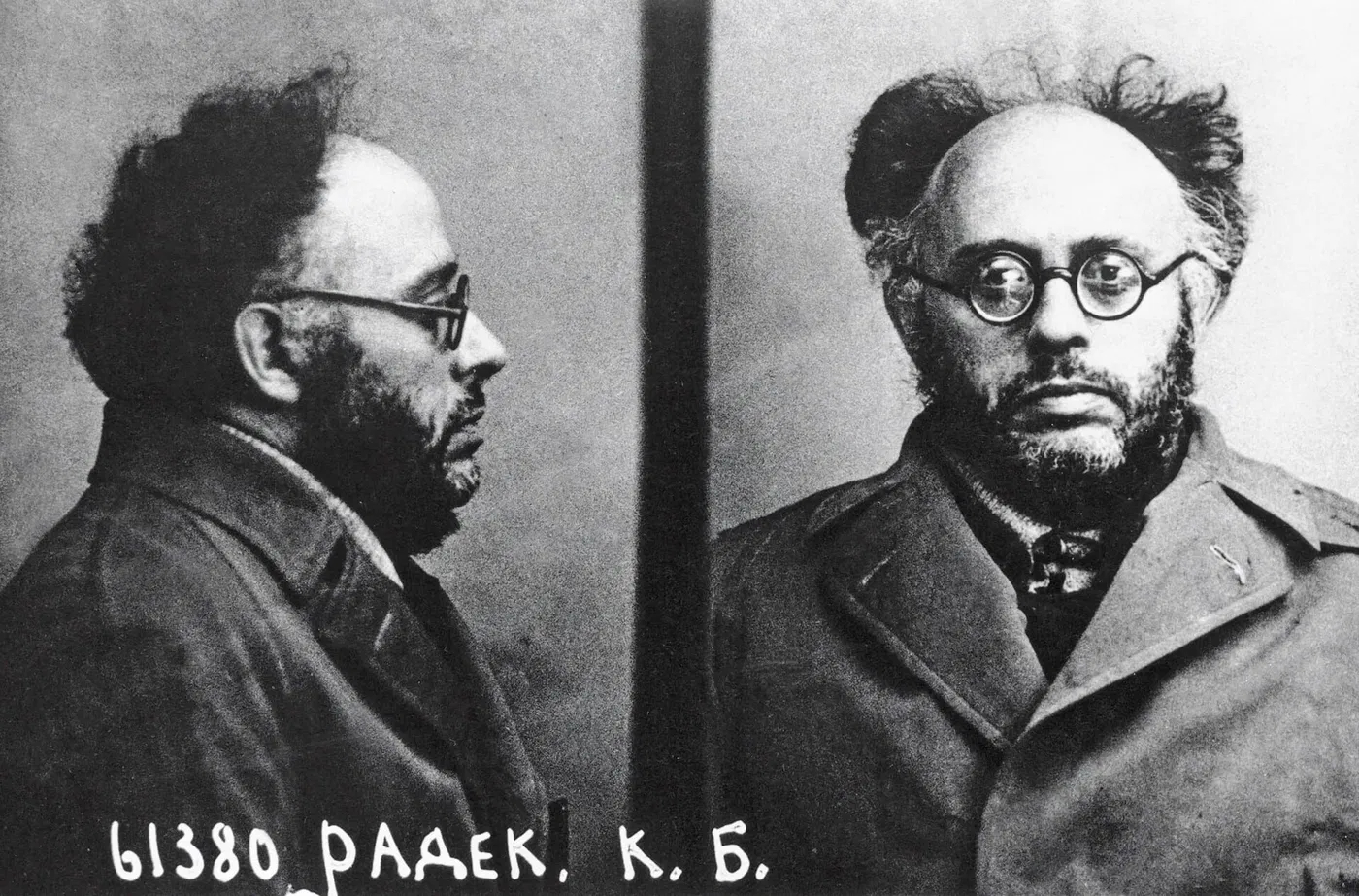
Radek's NKVD mugshot, 1937

He was reportedly killed in a labor camp on Stalin's orders following a fight with a fellow Left Opposition inmate named Varezhnikov. According to an investigation of the Central Committee of the CPSU and the KGB after the Khrushchev Thaw, his murder was organized under the Supervision of the senior NKVD operative Pyotr Kubatkin.

Radek has been credited with originating a number of political jokes about Joseph Stalin. He was posthumously rehabilitated in 1988, under Mikhail Gorbachev.

== Selected works ==
=== Available in English ===
- "The Unity of the Working Class" (1909)
- "Marxism and the Problems of War" (1914)
- "The End of a Song" (1916)
- "The Development of Socialism from Science to Action" (1918)
- "Karl Liebknecht – At the Martyr’s Graveside" (1919)
- "Anti-Parliamentarism" (1920)
- Proletarian Dictatorship and Terrorism. Forgotten Books. 2012 [1920].
- "The Labour Movement, Shop Committees and the Third International" (1920)
- "The Polish Question and the International" (1920)
- "England and the East" (1920)
- "Bertrand Russell’s Sentimental Journey" (1921)
- "Is the Russian Revolution a Bourgeois Revolution?" (1921)
- "The Downfall of Levi" (1921)
- "On the Trade Unions", Second Congress of the Communist International, response to the discussion (1921)
- "Outlines of World Politics" (1921)
- Richardson, Al, ed. (1995) [1922]. "The Paths of the Russian Revolution". In Defence of the Russian Revolution: A Selection of Bolshevik Writings, 1917–1923. Porcupine Press. pp. 35–75. ISBN 978-1899438020.
- "Foundation of the Two and a Half International" (1922)
- "Eve of Fusion of the Second and Two-and-a-Half International (1922)
- "From the Hague to Essen" (1922)
- "The Greek Revolution" (1922)
- "The Winding-Up of the Versailles Treaty", report to the IV. Congress of the Comintern (1922)
- "Leon Trotsky, Organizer of Victory" (1923)
- "Ruhr and Hamburg" (1923)
- "Lenin" (1923)
- "The International Outlook" (1923)
- "Leo Schlageter: The Wanderer into the Void" ("The Schlageter Speech") (1923)
- "Fascism and Communism" (1924)
- "Through Germany in the Sealed Coach" (1924)
- "November: A Page of Recollections". Soviet Studies. III: 411–430. 1951–1952 [1926].
- "A Letter to Klara Zetkin" (1926)
- "Larisa Reisner" (1927)
- "Appeal for Trotsky" (1928)
- "Capitalist Slavery vs. Socialist Organisation of Labour" (1931)
- "Greetings to Romain Rolland" (1931)
- "The Revision of the Versaille Treaty" (Labour Monthly, 1933)
- "The Birth of the First International" (1934)
- "Fifteen Years of the Communist International" (pamphlet) (1934)
- "Contemporary World Literature and the Tasks of Proletarian Art", speech at the Soviet Writers Congress (1934)
- "Felix Dzerzhinski (1935)

=== Available in German ===
- Theorie und Praxis der 2 1/2 Internationale (Theory and Practice of 2 1/2 International) (1921)

== See also ==
- Outline of the Russian Revolution and Civil War
- Bibliography of the Russian Revolution and Civil War
- Bibliography of Stalinism and the Soviet Union
- Index of Old Bolsheviks
- Index of articles related to the Russian Revolution and Civil War
