= Social Democracy of the Kingdom of Poland and Lithuania =

Political party

Social Democracy of the Kingdom of Poland and Lithuania Socjaldemokracja Królestwa Polskiego i Litwy
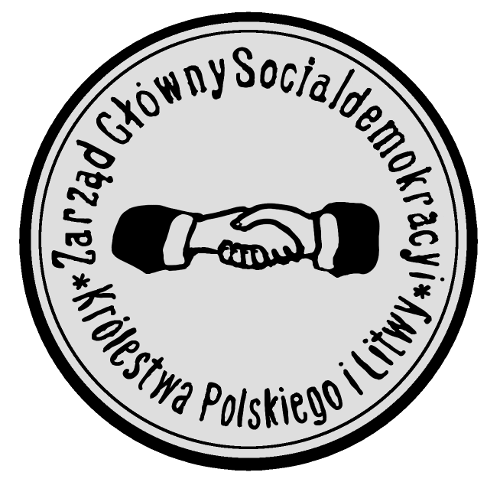
- Founded: 1893 (as SDKP); 1899 (as SDKPiL)
- Dissolved: 1918
- Merged into: Communist Party of Poland
- Membership: 40,000 (1906)
- Ideology: Socialism; Marxism
- Political position: Far-left
- International affiliation: Second International

The Social Democracy of the Kingdom of Poland and Lithuania (Polish: Socjaldemokracja Królestwa Polskiego i Litwy, SDKPiL), originally the Social Democracy of the Kingdom of Poland (SDKP), was a Marxist political party founded in 1893 and later served as an autonomous section of the Russian Social Democratic Labour Party. It later merged into the Communist Workers' Party of Poland. Its most famous member was Rosa Luxemburg.

== Leading members ==
The leading cadre of the SDKPiL were a famous group, many of whom would play a role in the Russian Revolution of October 1917. Chief among them was Rosa Luxemburg, the leading theoretician of the movement. Other notable figures included Leo Jogiches, Julian Marchlewski, Adolf Warski, Felix Dzerzhinsky, Stanisław Pestkowski, Karl Sobelson, Marcin Kasprzak, Józef Unszlicht, Bronisław Wesołowski, Kazimierz Cichowski and Jakob Fürstenberg. Internationalists, many of them would play leading roles in Germany as well as in Russia.

== History ==
=== 1893: Formation ===
The party was founded in 1893 based on an internationalist Marxist program. At its core was the Union of Polish Workers which refused to back the national demands contained within the program of the Polish Socialist Party (PPS). As a result of the differing positions on the question of Polish national independence the former Union of Polish Workers and the Second Proletariat left the PPS in 1893 establishing the SDKP, differences between the two parties deepening at the International Socialist Congress of August 1893 when the All-Polish delegation, led by Ignacy Daszyński of Galicia opposed seating Marchlewski and Rosa Luxemburg now making her first appearance at an international gathering. Differences were to deepen at the next International Socialist Congress in 1896 where Luxemburg was opposed by the future dictator of Poland, Józef Piłsudski, representing the PPS.

=== 1899: Merger with the Union of Workers in Lithuania ===
Conceived as the geographical representative party of the workers, rather than national, the SDKP was to fuse with the Union of Workers in Lithuania in 1899 as a result of the work carried out by Feliks Dzierżyński, future Bolshevik head of the Cheka. The SDKP becoming the Social Democracy of the Kingdom of Poland and Lithuania. The young party enjoyed a period of growth impelled by the organisational efforts of Dzierżyński in Warsaw before he was arrested again.

=== 1903: The split between Bolsheviks and Mensheviks ===
Consistent with its self-conception as a geographic unit of an All-Russian Social Democratic party, the SDKPiL attended the 1903 Congress of the Russian Social Democratic Labour Party (RSDLP) held in London at which the famous division occurred between the Menshevik and Bolshevik factions. The delegation from the SDKPiL was concerned chiefly with maintaining its own autonomy within the party as a whole and with the removal of recognition of the Right of Nations to Self Determination from the party's program. This was the beginning of the long dispute between the Polish and Russian Social Democrats on this question. Only a little while later theoretical differences would also develop in regard to the Bolshevik slogan of "the Democratic Dictatorship of the Proletariat and the Peasantry" which the Polish revolutionaries rejected.

=== 1905: War and Revolution ===
The War with Japan and the Russian Revolution of 1905 saw the party playing a leading role in the struggle. Strongly defeatist towards the Tsarist state the SDKPiL opposed the PPS which adopted a pro-Japanese stance. However, as the tide of struggle rose the party worked ever more closely with the Bund and the left wing of the PPS. Luxemburg returned from exile and the Mass Strike was placed at the centre of the organisation's revolutionary theory. Despite this emphasis on the actions of the masses the party disposed of fighting squads which defended the workers movement from the Tsarist authorities. By 1906 the party had 40,000 members. 70% were Polish, 25% German and 5% were Jewish.

=== Downturn and split ===
The period after the revolution was one of retreat for the left and the SDKPiL was to split into two factions as a result. Always closely connected to the RSDLP the Polish party's problems were intricately interwoven with those of the Russian Party. Attending the Fifth Congress of the RSDLP held in London in 1907 Jogiches and Warski were elected to the united Central Committee where they assumed a position of support in respect of the Bolshevik faction. In the following years however the All-Russia party almost ceased to exist as a unified body and the SDKPiL itself distanced itself from all the Russian factions while seeking to promote unity of the various factions. This perspective ensured that Leon Trotsky was to be a frequent contributor to the theoretical publication of the SDKPiL the Social Democratic Review. The SDKPiL itself split, in 1911, during the downturn in class struggle of these years with the Warsaw Committee leading a breakaway from the Central Committee dominated by Jogiches.

=== World War I: New unity in opposition to war ===
Despite divisions in its ranks the entire party adopted an internationalist position with the onset of World War I in 1914. The Warsaw Committee of the SDKPiL called a conference of all revolutionary factions for August 2 at which both the Warsaw Committee and Central Committee were joined by the PPS Lewica (Left) and the Bund. The conference issued an unequivocal denunciation of imperialist war and called for the workers to take state power. Despite this attempts to coordinate the different parties came to nothing. But as the war continued both social democratic factions joined the Zimmerwald movement with the Warsaw Committee becoming particularly close to the Bolsheviks. The growing clarification of right and left internationally would enable the two factions of the party to reunify at a congress held on November 4, 1916, a new Central Committee was elected and the party pledged support to the Zimmerwald movement.

=== End of the party ===
The February Revolution of 1917 in Russia saw the Russian Provisional Government issue a manifesto on March 30 recognising Poland's right to an autonomous status, while the Petrograd Soviet recognised Poland's right to self-determination. Those Polish Social Democrats working with the Bolsheviks (such as Dzierżyński and Julian Leszczyński (Leński)) vehemently dissented. The end of the war in 1918 saw SDKPiL members spread throughout revolutionary Europe and playing leading roles everywhere they went. Thus Luxemburg and Jogiches stood at the head of the newly founded Communist Party of Germany (KPD, founded 1918), while Dzierżyński, Radek and Yakov Hanecki all participated fully in the October Revolution in Russia and took up posts in the nascent Soviet government. The history of the SDKPiL drew to a close when its influence and that of its members had never been as widespread. In 1918, many of the party's members would take part in the movement of workers' councils in Poland, before eventually merging with the PPS Lewica to form the Communist Workers Party of Poland.

== See also ==
- Polish Socialist Party
- Rosa Luxemburg
- Russian Social Democratic Labour Party
