= Adolf Warski =

Polish politician (1868–1937)

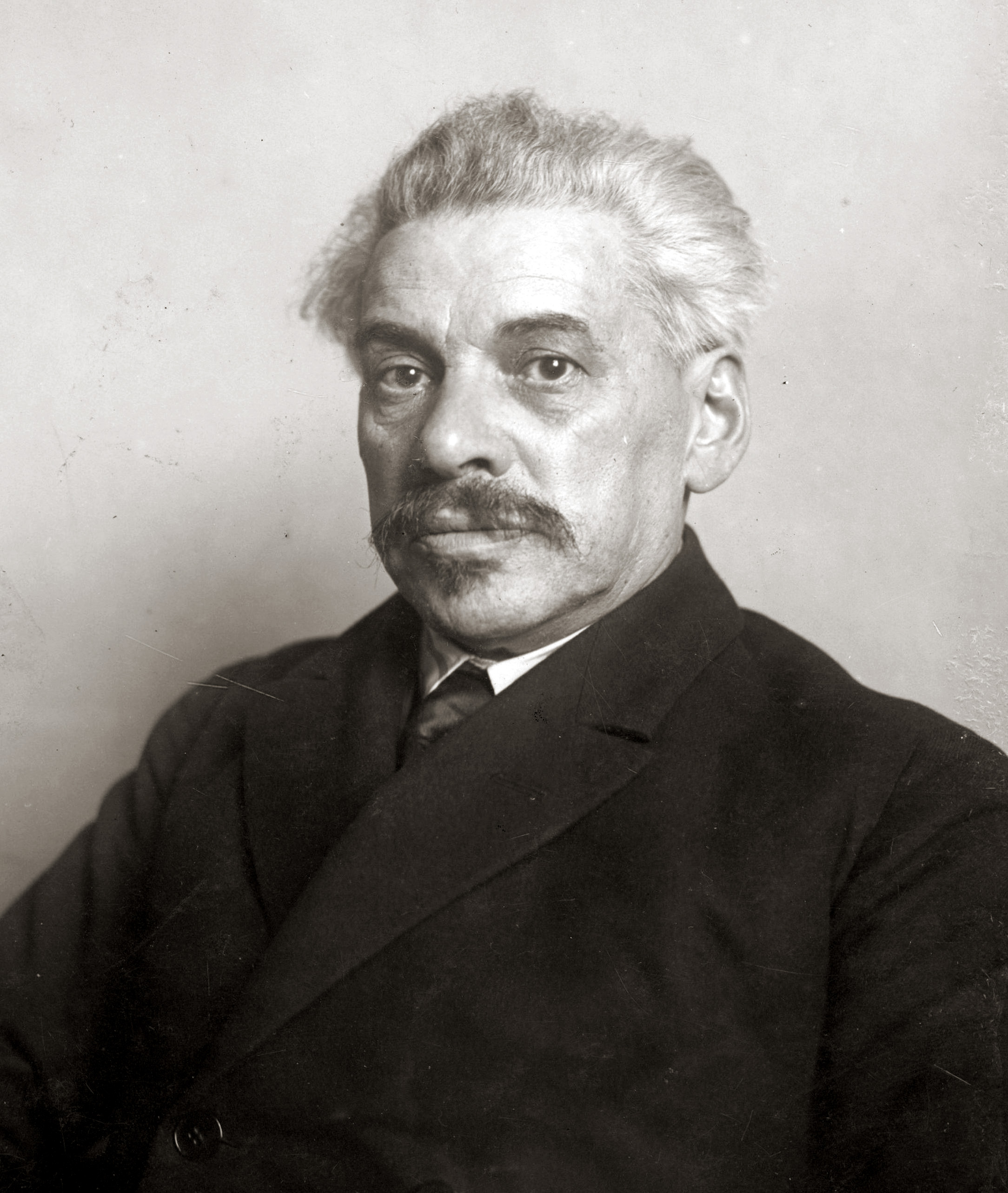
- Adolf Warski

Member of the Sejm
- In office January 1926 – November 1927

Personal details
- Born: Adolf Jerzy Warszawski; April 20, 1868 Warsaw, Russian Empire
- Died: August 21, 1937 (aged 69) Moscow, Soviet Union
- Party: Communist Party of Poland (1918–); Social Democracy of the Kingdom of Poland and Lithuania (1893–1918)

Adolf Warski (Ru: Адольф Варшавский) (born Adolf Jerzy Warszawski; 20 April 1868 – 21 August 1937), was a Polish communist leader, journalist and theoretician of the communist movement in Poland. During Stalin's Great Purge he was arrested and executed.

== Biography ==
Warski was born in Warsaw into an assimilated Polish Jewish family. His father Saul, a commercial clerk, changed the name to Stanisław. The family was of pro-independence and patriotic traditions.

Warski was active in the communist movement from 1889, when he co-founded the Union of Polish workers, with Julian Marchlewski and Bronislaw Wesolowski. In 1893, he was one of the four founders of the Social Democracy of the Kingdom of Poland and Lithuania (SDKPiL), with Rosa Luxemburg, Leo Jogiches, and Marchlewski. In 1897, he moved to Munich, where he became close to leaders of the Russian Social Democratic Labour Party, In July 1903, during the second congress of the RSDLP in Brussels, Warski pleaded for the SDPKiL to be recognised as the autonomous Polish section of the Russian party. Warski returned to Poland during the 1905 Russian Revolution, but emigrated again after it was suppressed. In 1907, during the London Congress of the RSDLP, he was elected as the Polish representative on its Central Committee.

In 1918, Warski was one of the founders of the Communist Party of Poland (KPP), formed by a merger of the SDPKiL and the left faction of the Polish Socialist Party. Warski held positions in the KPP's Central Committee (1919–29) and Politburo (1923–29, with an interruption). He was the senior member of the triumvirate known as the 'three Ws' who ran the party for its first six years. The other triumvirs were Henryk Walecki and Wera Kostrzewa.

After the failure of the 1923 communist uprising in Germany, and similar but smaller-scale disturbances in Poland, the three Ws vigorously defended the leaders of the German party, who were accused of passivity, and as a power struggle developed in the Kremlin between during Lenin's terminal illness, pitching Joseph Stalin and the chairman of Comintern, Grigory Zinoviev against Trotsky, they issued a statement in December 1923 declaring that the name of comrade Trotsky is for our party, for the whole International, for the whole revolutionary world proletariat, indissolubly bound up with the victorious October Revolution." Warski and his allies then under attack from a left wing faction, led by Julian Lenski.

The record of the Polish leadership was subjected to a three-day examination during the Fifth Comintern Congress in June 1924, chaired by Stalin, after which Warski capitulated and wrote a recantation, published in Pravda in January 1925.

Unlike Walecki and Kostrzewa, he was allowed to continue as an active member of the Polish CP. In 1926 was elected as a member of the Polish Parliament (Sejm), but in March 1929, he was forced to emigrate to the Soviet Union where he worked in the Marx-Engels-Lenin Institute on the history of the Polish labour movement. He was an atheist.

At the age of 69, Warski was one of the oldest victims of the Great Purge. In June 1937, the head of the NKVD, Nikolai Yezhov told a plenum of the Central Committee that the police had uncovered a 'Polish Military organisation', whose members had infiltrated the USSR by posing as political refugees. Warski was arrested and accused of being a leader of this fictitious organisation. Under interrogation, he admitted to having made political errors during the 1920s but categorically denied belonging to any organisation working for the Polish government. It was rumoured that under interrogation by the NKVD, he went mad, and imagined that he was in the hands of the Gestapo. He was shot on 21 August 1937.

Warski was fully rehabilitated in 1956, during the De-Stalinization process that followed Joseph Stalin's death, and the Szczecin shipyard, Stocznia Szczecińska Nowa, was renamed in his honor (Stocznia im. Adolfa Warskiego) by the authorities of the People's Republic of Poland.
