= 5th Congress of the Russian Social Democratic Labour Party =

1907 meeting in London

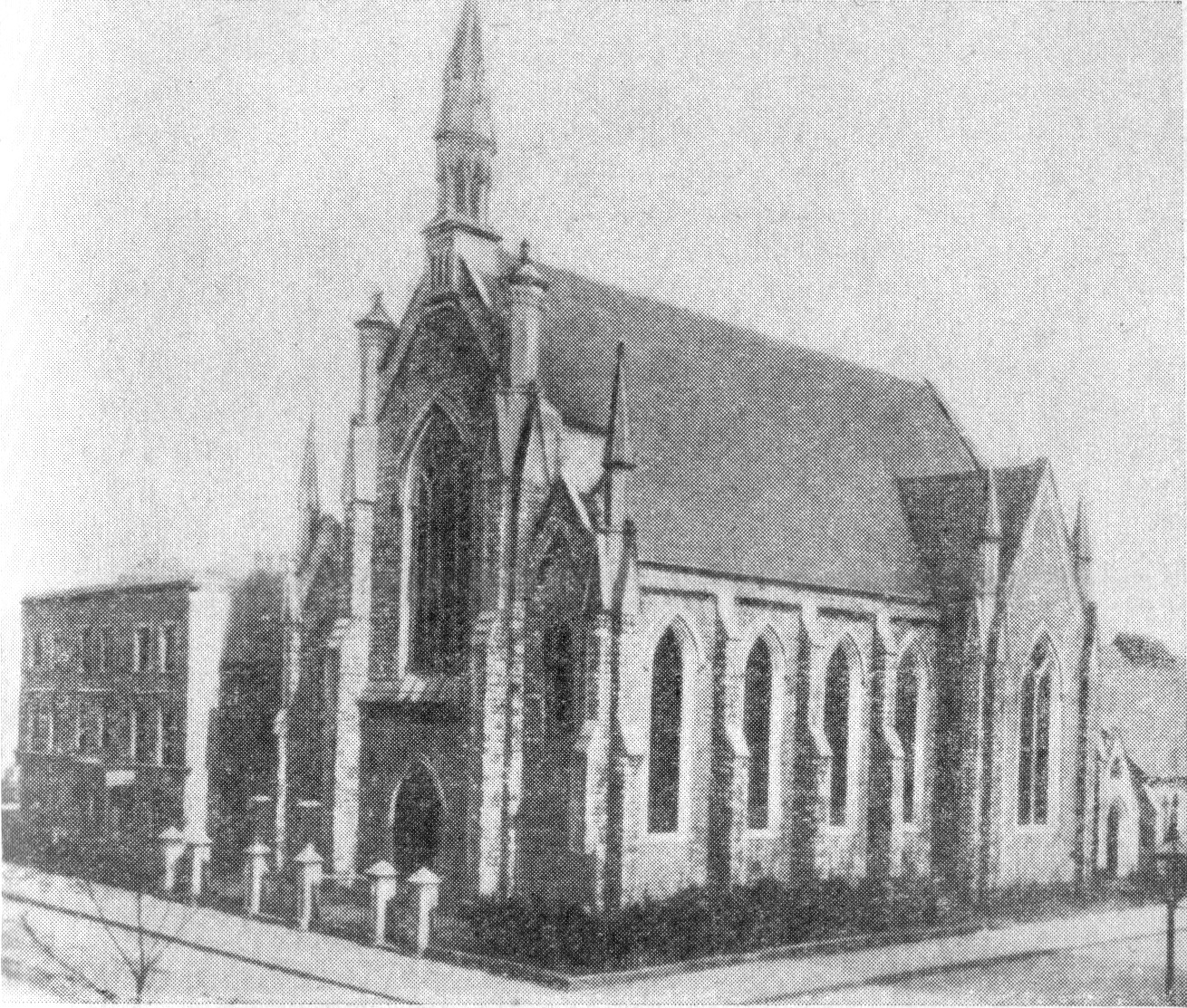
- Brotherhood Church at Southgate Road in London, where congress sessions took place.
- Host country: United Kingdom
- Date: May 13, 1907-June 1, 1907
- Cities: London
- Participants: Vladimir Lenin, Leon Trotsky
- Follows: 4th Congress (1906)

The 5th (London) Congress of the Russian Social Democratic Labour Party was held in London between May 13 and June 1, 1907. The 5th Congress had the largest attendance of the Congresses of the unified RSDLP. Thirty-five sessions of the Congress were held in the Brotherhood Church in Hackney, during which stormy debates took place.

== Delegations ==
Visualization of the strength of party factions present at the 5th Congress of the Russian Social Democratic Labour Party – 105 Bolsheviks, 97 Mensheviks, 59 Bundists, 44 SDKPiL, 29 Latvian Social Democracy, 4 'non-faction' delegates

338 delegates attended the Congress. There were:

- 105 Bolshevik delegates, representing 33,000 members
- 97 Menshevik delegates representing 43,000 members
- 59 Bundist delegates representing 33,000 members
- 44 Polish Social Democrat (SDKPiL) delegates, representing 28,000 members
- 29 Latvian Social Democrat delegates, representing 13,000 members
- 4 'non-faction' delegates

300 of the delegates had voting rights. Vladimir Lenin was a delegate, representing the Upper Kama region. Also attending were Joseph Stalin and Leon Trotsky.

== Debates ==
During the Congress, the Bolshevik and Menshevik factions of the party clashed. The Bolsheviks argued in favour of preparations for an armed uprising against Czarist rule, which Menshevik leader Julius Martov denounced as 'putschist'. Another disagreement was how the party should relate to the trade union movement. The Mensheviks argued for creating a 'Workers' Congress', as a first step towards transforming the party into a West European-style legal Social Democratic party. On both of these issues, the Bolsheviks were supported by Polish and Latvian Social Democrats, guaranteeing a revolutionary majority at the Congress.

In the clashes between the Bolshevik–Polish–Latvian and the Menshevik–Bundist sides, Trotsky (who had escaped from captivity) acted as an intermediary (attending as a non-voting delegate). Having adopted a 'centrist' position, he was the sole person at the Congress who could mediate between the two sides.

Another debated issue was "expropriations". To support their political activities, the RSDLP and other revolutionary groups in Russia (such as the Socialist Revolutionary Party and various anarchist factions) used "expropriations", a euphemism for armed robberies of government offices or private businesses. Lenin and the most militant Bolsheviks supported continued "expropriations", while the Mensheviks advocated a non-violent approach to revolution. The 5th Congress passed a resolution which condemned participation in or assistance to all violent activity, including "expropriations", as "disorganising and demoralizing", and called for all party militias to be disbanded. This resolution passed with 65 % supporting and 6 % opposing (others abstained or did not vote). All Mensheviks and even some Bolsheviks voted in favor. Ironically, one of the most famous "expropriations" (the 1907 Tiflis bank robbery, organized by a small group of Bolsheviks) took place only weeks after this vote.

== Naming dispute ==
Another controversy erupted over the naming of the Congress. The Bolsheviks referred to the meeting as the "Fifth Congress". One delegate, Fyodor Dan, opposed this naming. In 1905 the Bolsheviks had held a "Third Party Congress", which the Mensheviks and the Bund didn't recognize as an official party meeting. Therefore, they objected to the 1907 meeting being designated the "Fifth Congress". Bundist delegate L. G. Shapiro proposed the name "London Congress of the Russian Social Democratic Labour Party", which was adopted.

== Election ==
Bolshevik delegates at the 5th Congress of the RSDLP (Note that Fyodor Sergeyev did not actually participate at this Congress)

Menshevik, Bundist, and Polish Social Democrat delegates at the 5th Congress

Although the Congress saw several victories for the Bolsheviks, in the elections to the 5th Central Committee and the editorial board of the party newspaper Sotsial-Demokrat neither of the Russian factions won a majority. The Polish and Latvian Social Democrats, who were troubled by the Bolshevik-Menshevik division, supported both sides at various times. The newly elected Central Committee had twelve full members and 22 alternate members. Two Bundists were included in the Central Committee at a later stage, Raphael Abramovitch and Mikhail Liber.

Faction	Full members	Alternate members
Bolsheviks	5	10
Mensheviks	4	7
SDKPiL	2	3
Latvian Social Democracy	1	2

The elected Central Committee was sharply divided along factional lines, and could not function as a unified party leadership. At the end of the congress, the Bolshevik delegates elected a Bolshevik Centre led by Lenin.

== Bibliography ==
- Geifman, Anna (1993). Thou Shalt Kill: Revolutionary Terrorism in Russia, 1894–1917. Princeton, New Jersey: Princeton University Press. ISBN 0-691-08778-4.
- Nicolaevsky, Boris (1995). On the history of the Bolshevist Center, in: Secret pages of history, Ed. Yu. G. Felshtinsky (in Russian). Moscow: Humanities Publishing. ISBN 5-87121-007-4.
- Souvarine, Boris (2005). "Chapter IV – A Professional Revoluationary". Stalin: A Critical Survey of Bolshevism. New York City, New York: Kessinger Publishing. pp. 92–106. ISBN 978-1-4191-1307-9.
- Trotsky, Leon (2009). "Chapter IV: The period of reaction". Stalin – An Appraisal of the man and his influence, edited and translated from the Russian by Charles Malamuth. London: Marxists Internet Archive. ISBN 978-0-261-62076-6.
- "The London Congress of the Russian Social-Democratic Labour Party – (Notes of a Delegate)", J.V. Stalin, June 20 and July 10, 1907, on marxists.org
