= Leo Jogiches =

Polish Marxist revolutionary (1867–1919)

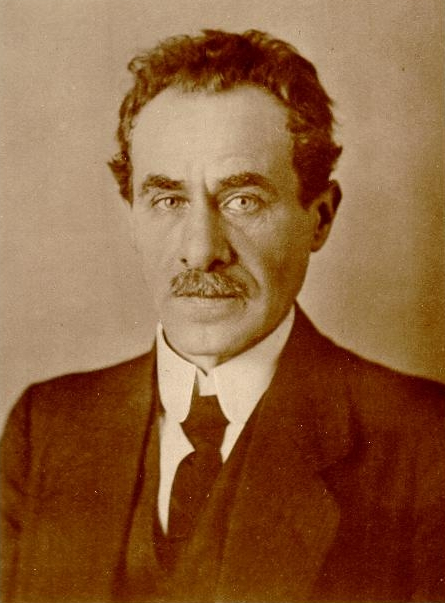
- Jogiches c. 1919
- Born: Leon Jogiches; 17 July 1867; Vilnius, Russian Empire
- Died: 10 March 1919 (aged 51); Berlin, Germany
- Other name: Jan Tyszka
- Known for: Marxist revolutionary
- Partner: Rosa Luxemburg
- Central institution membership: 1919: Full member, KPD Zentrale

Leon "Leo" Jogiches (Russian: Лев "Лео" Йогихес; 17 July 1867 – 10 March 1919), also commonly known by the party name Jan Tyszka, was a Polish Marxist revolutionary and politician, active in Poland, Lithuania, and Germany.

Jogiches was a founder of the political party known as the Social Democracy of the Kingdom of Poland and Lithuania (main forerunner of the Communist Party of Poland) in 1893 and a key figure in the underground Spartacus League in Germany, the predecessor of the Communist Party of Germany, during the years of World War I.

For many years the personal companion and a close political ally of internationally famous revolutionary Rosa Luxemburg, Jogiches was assassinated in Berlin by right-wing paramilitary forces in March 1919 while investigating Luxemburg's and Karl Liebknecht's murder some weeks before.

== Early life ==
Leon Jogiches was born on 17 July 1867 to a wealthy Polish-Jewish family in Vilnius, now Lithuania, then part of the Russian Empire.

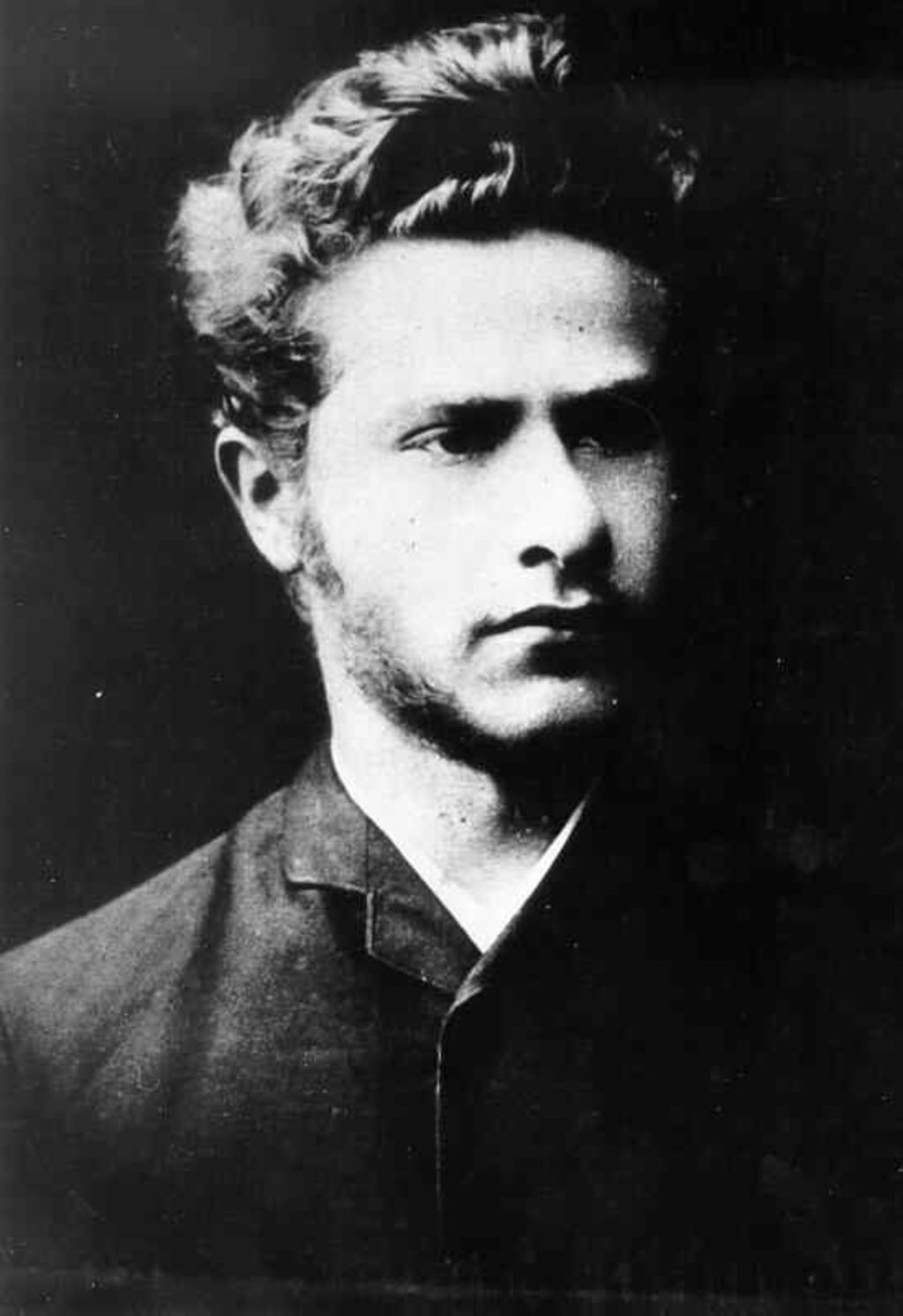
Jogiches as a young man, circa 1880s

As a young man of 18, Jogiches founded one of the earliest underground socialist study circles in Vilnius, its 1885 origin predating the foundation of the first mass international socialist organization in the Russian Empire by a dozen years. Using the first of many pseudonyms, Liofka (little Leo), Jogiches attained an almost legendary local status for his tenacious dedication to the anti-Tsarist cause. This commitment led to two arrests and short terms in jail, in both 1888 and 1889.

== Zürich emigration ==
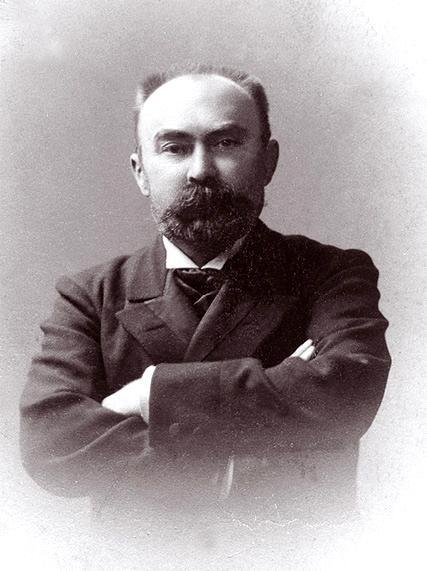
The domineering "father of Russian Marxism" Georgy Plekhanov quickly became a lasting enemy of the young Jogiches

With the threat of conscription into the Tsar's army looming — possibly a penal battalion — Jogiches escaped to Zürich, Switzerland. He brought with him during his furtive departure a considerable sum of money, including both personal and donated funds earmarked for the publication and distribution of socialist literature. A few months after his arrival in Zürich, the 23-year old Jogiches met a fellow 20-year old ethnic Jewish political émigré from Tsarist autocracy, Rosa Luxemburg. The pair fell in love and became both close political allies and personal companions.

Shortly after his arrival in Switzerland, Jogiches made contact with pioneer Russian Marxist Georgy Plekhanov and proposed a business partnership for the publication of radical literature, in which Jogiches' money and publishing expertise would be complemented by Plekhanov's prestige and copyright control of Russian editions of works by Karl Marx and Frederick Engels.

A financial split of 50-50 was proposed by Jogiches, which was abruptly rejected by Plekhanov and an ongoing personal frostiness between the pair ensued. Not to be deterred by the clash of egos and the dispute over money, Jogiches would nevertheless proceed to establish his publishing house, The Social-Democratic Library (Sotsialdemokraticheskaya Biblioteka) in 1892, issuing pirated editions of works by Marx, Karl Kautsky, and others — further poisoning relations with Plekhanov.

The bitter battle with Plekhanov over publishing had the effect of isolating Jogiches (and his companion Luxemburg) from the bulk of the exile Russian colony in Switzerland. Jogiches turned his primary attention to Polish affairs for the next several years, doubtlessly influenced in the decision to a great extent by Luxemburg. In July 1893 Jogiches financed a new Paris-based socialist publication in the Polish language, Sprawa Robotnicza (The Workers' Cause), which emphasized close cooperation between Polish and Russian radicals in their joint goal of overthrowing Tsarist autocracy and emphasizing the internationalist essence of the socialist movement. Writing as "R. Kruszyńska," Rosa Luxemburg played a key role in contributing content to this paper, soon taking over the editorship. The paper's internationalist political line proved somewhat at odds with the program of the Polish Socialist Party (PPS), however, with the latter emphasizing the aspect of Polish national liberation from Russian control, and consequently no support of the paper by the PPS leadership was to be forthcoming.

As Kruszyńska the 23-year old Luxemburg sought admission as a delegate to the 3rd Congress of the Socialist International, held in Zürich from 6 to 12 August 1893, as the representative of Sprawa Robotnicza. The mandate of the upstart young socialist representing the new independent socialist publication was challenged by the PPS in front of the Congress, however, and by a vote of 9 to 7, with 3 abstentions, Luxemburg was denied a seat at the Congress. Luxemburg departed the gathering under protest — with bad feelings between her and Jogiches on the one hand and the PPS on the other festering further.

Late in 1893, Jogiches and Luxemburg took yet another step towards permanent independence from the mainline Polish socialist movement with the establishment of a new Marxist political party, the Social Democracy of the Kingdom of Poland (SDKP), a group later known as the Social Democracy of the Kingdom of Poland and Lithuania (SDKPiL). This new group stood aloof from PSP, a broad coalition party founded in 1892 and supported by the bulk of the Russian exile community.

== Revolution of 1905 ==
Jogiches as he appeared at the time of his 1906 arrest in Warsaw

The Russian Revolution of 1905 erupted abruptly on "Bloody Sunday," 22 January with the shooting deaths of hundreds of peaceful protesters who were attempting to present a petition to Tsar Nicholas II. Within days, protests and strikes calling for establishment of a constitutional order swept the empire, which rocked the state censorship and threatened the stability of the government for months.

For the time, Leo Jogiches and his common-law wife, Luxemburg, remained in German exile, their eyes set firmly on the German movement. Jogiches returned to Poland first, traveling to Warsaw in the spring of 1905 to Warsaw to establish the Central Committee of the SDKPiL there together with Julian Marchlewski, Adolf Warski, Felix Dzerzhinsky, and Yakov Hanecki. Luxemburg remained in Berlin as the representative of the SDKPiL abroad, representing it before the Socialist International and attempting to win support for the organization and its activities among the German socialist movement. Within the SPD Luxemburg, drawing upon the ongoing Russian experience, pushed the idea of the "mass strike" as a strategic tool for the achievement of power, over the objections of trade unionists and more conservative and electorally-driven party leaders.

Jogiches would return to delegate to the annual congress of the SPD, held at Jena in the middle of September 1905.

As part of an ongoing battle to radicalize the party's daily newspaper, Vorwärts (Forward), Luxemburg was named to the paper's editorial board in the fall of 1905. She would spend the months of November and December 1905 churning out aggressive commentary about Russian events for her German readers, attempting to draw analogies between the Russian and German situations whenever possible, her contributions appearing almost daily. It was not until the morning of 28 December 1905, that she would board a train for Warsaw in Russian Poland to herself become a direct participant in the ongoing revolutionary effort to overthrow the Tsarist government of the Russian Empire.

In March 1906, Luxemburg and Jogiches were arrested for their revolutionary activity. Jogiches was sentenced by the court to 8 years of hard labor followed by lifetime exile to Siberia. He served months in prison before managing to escape across the border to Berlin.

Jogiches attended the 1907 London Congress of the Russian Social Democratic Labour Party, where he was elected a candidate member of the party's governing Central Committee.

== Split with Luxemburg ==
Although an intelligent person and dedicated revolutionary socialist thinker, Jogiches was virtually incapable of converting his ideas into written words: "the mere thought of putting his ideas on paper paralyzes him," Luxemburg later recalled. Consequently, the chief contribution of Jogiches was that of literary stimulant to the skilled publicist Luxemburg as well as behind-the-scenes organizer of the fledgling underground political party that he had helped to establish.

As Luxemburg grew in fame as a Marxist theoretician, Jogiches became gradually more embittered about his life, until by his mid-30s, he had come, as one Luxemburg biographer phrased it, to have "fully realized the gap between his youthful aspirations and the disillusionments of reality."

Interpersonal conflict followed, exacerbated by the different trajectories of personal achievement, with the pair permanently separating in 1907. Their political collaboration continued, despite the personal rift.

During 1909, Jogiches formed a tactical alliance with the Bolshevik leader, Vladimir Lenin, and backing him as he tried to gain control of the Russian Social Democratic Labour Party, by excluding the Mensheviks. In the process, Jogiches gained control of funds belonging to the party, which had been held in trust by Karl Kautsky and Klara Zetkin, leading German Marxists, who were advised by Rosa Luxemburg to hand the money to a commission that Jogiches controlled. He tried to use his position to create an organisation that would have brought together Bolsheviks and left-wing Mensheviks, but was outwitted by Lenin, who wrested control of the money. The outcome was a bitter rift between Lenin and Jogiches, whose position was further weakened by a revolt against his leadership of the SDPKiL, led by Hanecki and Karl Radek, who formed a separate faction that aligned with Lenin.

== Spartakusbund ==
Jogiches was the editor of the illegal Spartacus newsletter, launched in September 1916, from which the underground Spartakusbund took its name

On 4 August 1914, the parliamentary representatives of the Social Democratic Party of Germany (SPD) agreed among themselves to maintain party discipline and voted en bloc in support of a bill authorizing war credits for the Imperial government in the erupting international conflagration that would be remembered to history as World War I. This stunning reversal of the Second International's position on capitalist war came as a shock to radical internationalist elements in the party, including Jogiches. Rosa Luxemburg's immediate inclination was to publish and clandestinely circulate a manifesto signed by anti-war leaders of the SPD calling for spontaneous resistance — an effort which Jogiches criticized as no substitute for actual political organization. Luxemburg's idea was soon abandoned due to lack of support from the broad circle of party leaders tapped for the effort, of whom no more than a small handful responded.

Rosa Luxemburg and a small network of her friends and co-thinkers began to organize themselves politically from the summer of 1914 and into 1915. These included Leo Jogiches, Julian Marchlewski, Franz Mehring, and Klara Zetkin, her lawyer Paul Levi, and second secretary of the SPD in Berlin Wilhelm Pieck, among others. It would be several months after getting together before the first leaflet of the group would be published. The group sought to make contact with socialists from other European countries through letters to the Swiss socialist press, condemning the war effort and linking the struggle for peace with the class struggle to overthrow autocracy.

Imperial authorities were not deaf to the threat of anti-war radicalism gaining a foothold and conscripted left wing parliamentary official Karl Liebknecht on 7 February 1915, only to begin transferring him from one military unit to another in an effort to isolate him and neutralize his influence. Luxemburg was similarly targeted not long after, arrested later that same month and held for eight weeks. Anti-war sentiment was short-circuited by arrests of leaders and suppression of anti-war publications, but not silenced entirely, with more than 1,000 women demonstrating for peace in front of the Reichstag on 28 May 1915 — further adding to the government's unease.

Active efforts were made to locate active supporters in every locality and every large factory and the radical Luxemburg circle was in contact with individuals in more than 300 places by the middle of 1915. A formal conference was held on 5 May 1915, in the apartment of Wilhelm Pieck to discuss a regional system of organization, which was conceived as a secret network of anti-war militants operating within the SPD. The group began to issue its own newspaper, Die Internationale (The International), edited by Luxemburg and Mehring, only to see it immediately banned. The short-lived paper did provide a handle for the burgeoning underground organization, however, which began to be known as the Internationale group.

The Internationale group held a conference on 1 January 1916, in the apartment of Karl Liebknecht, attended by 12 delegates. This group adopted a program drafted from prison by Rosa Luxemburg and was preparatory to a more authoritative gathering held on 19 March in Berlin. The group did not immediately seek to establish themselves as an independent political party, believing instead that while a new Third International was historically necessary, instead of a sectarian split that would isolate the revolutionary left from the working class ensconced in the SPD, instead the "bureaucratic system" of the party needed to be made into a "democratic system." They sought to drive out pro-war political leaders, leaving a mass revolutionary party to await the forthcoming national revolution.

Following the jailing for their anti-war efforts of Liebknecht in May 1916 and Luxemburg that same July, Jogiches took over as the leader of the organization's underground activity. As leader of the underground organization it was Jogiches that oversaw the publication of the official newsletter Spartacus, launched in September 1916, which gave a new name to the faction — the Spartakusbund, rendered into English as the Spartacist League.

While the revolutionary left chose not to pursue an immediate split, seeking instead to purge the party of its right-wing leadership, the pro-war majority of the SPD worked throughout 1916 to pursue a purge of their own, marked by the 24 May 1916, expulsion of 33 dissident SPD members of the Reichstag from the party for their formal disavowal of the war effort and the October seizure of Vorwärts (Forward) from the SPD's pacifist wing by the pro-war party officialdom. A national conference of dissident socialists was held in Berlin on 7 January 1917, with 35 of the 157 delegates members of the Spartacistbund. This gathering was ruled an effort to "sabotage" the SPD through factionalism and mass expulsions of leftists followed.

The acrimony and expulsions within the SPD culminated with a formal split of the party. A Congress was held at Gotha during Easter 1917 by the pacifist center and revolutionary left socialists, with the gathering launching a new organization, the Independent Social Democratic Party of Germany (USPD). About 170,000 members remained with the old pro-war SPD, with the new USPD claiming a membership of 120,000 at its launch — including among its ranks Jogiches and the members of the Spartakusbund.

Jogiches would remain in the role of the underground Spartacist group until his own arrest in Berlin on 24 March 1918, at which time the leadership of the Spartacus League passed into the hands of Paul Levi. The Spartakusbund would later become one of the primary forces in the unity congress which established the Communist Party of Germany (KPD) at the end of 1918.

== Assassination ==
The Spartacus League led the failed Spartacist uprising, after which Luxemburg and Liebknecht were killed by right-wing paramilitary Freikorps troops. Jogiches was murdered in Moabit prison in Berlin on 10 March 1919, likely since he was investigating the assassination of Luxemburg and Liebknecht.

== Pseudonyms ==
Throughout his life as an underground revolutionary, Jogiches used a massive array of pseudonyms such as Jan Tyszka, the Polish pseudonym by which he was most commonly known (rendered into Russian as "Tyshka") as well as the lesser-known pseudonyms "Grosovsky," "Johannes Kraft", "Otto Engelmann", and "Krumbagel."

== Works ==
- "A Letter from Prison to Sophie Liebknecht," Mike Jones, trans. New Interventions, vol. 9, no 2. Originally published in Internationale wissenschaftliche Korrespondenz zur Geschichte der deutschen Arbeiterbewegung, vol. 33, no 1 (March 1997), pp. 100–102.
