= List of Polish Communist Party politicians =

A list of notable Polish politicians of the historical Communist Party of Poland (Polish: Komunistyczna Partia Polski).

== B ==
- Jakub Berman
- Bolesław Bierut
- Jerzy Borejsza
- Julian Brun

== C ==
- Jerzy Czeszejko-Sochacki

== D ==
- Gershon Dua-Bogen
- Tomasz Dąbal

== F ==
- Paweł Finder
- Feliksa Fornalska

== G ==
- Władysław Gomułka

== K ==
- Zenon Kliszko
- Maria Koszutska
- Władysław Kowalski

== L ==
- Witold Leder
- Julian Leszczyński

== M ==
- Stanisław Mazur
- Hilary Minc
- Mieczysław Moczar
- Zygmunt Modzelewski
- Bolesław Mołojec

== N ==
- Zenon Nowak
- Marceli Nowotko

== O ==
- Edward Ochab

== P ==
- Leon Pasternak

== R ==
- Stanisław Radkiewicz
- Roman Romkowski
- Józef Różański

== S ==
- Włodzimierz Sokorski
- Marian Spychalski
- Stefan Staszewski
- Lucjan Szenwald

== W ==
- Adolf Warski

== Z ==
- Roman Zambrowski
- Aleksander Zawadzki
