= Joseph Stalin's rise to power =

Events leading to his dictatorship of the Soviet Union

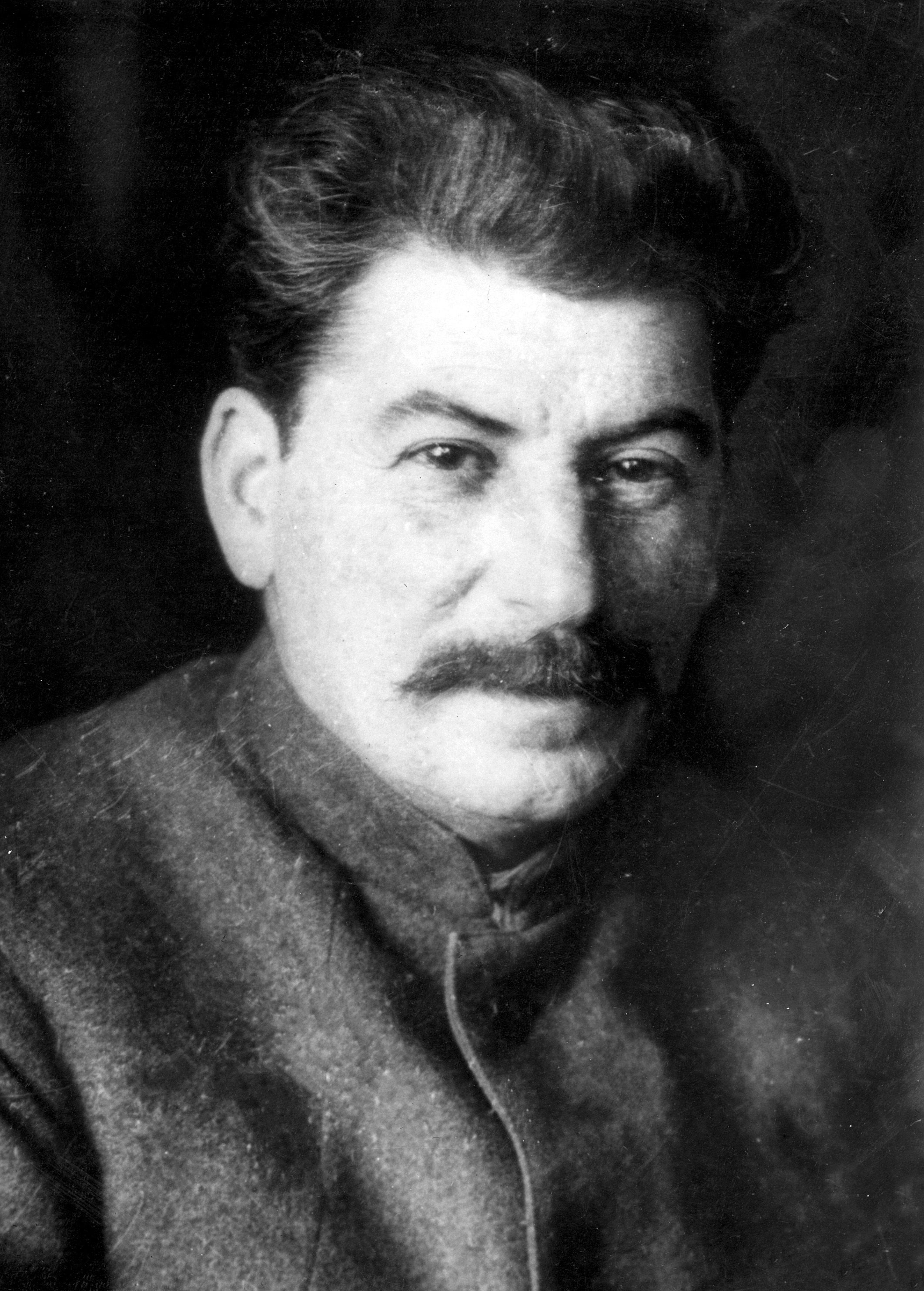
Stalin in the 1920s

Joseph Stalin, the General Secretary of the Communist Party of the Soviet Union from 1922 to 1952 and Chairman of the Council of Ministers from 1941 until his death in 1953, governed the country as its General Secretary from the late 1920s until his death. He had initially been part of the country's informal collective leadership with Lev Kamenev and Grigory Zinoviev after the death of Vladimir Lenin in 1924, but consolidated his power within the party and state, especially against the influences of Leon Trotsky and Nikolai Bukharin, in the mid-to-late 1920s.

Prior to the October Revolution of 1917, Stalin was a revolutionary who had joined the Bolshevik faction of the Russian Social Democratic Labor Party (RSDLP) led by Vladimir Lenin, in 1903. In Lenin's first government, Stalin was appointed leader of the People's Commissariat of Nationalities. He also took military positions in the Russian Civil War and Polish-Soviet War. Stalin was one of the Bolsheviks' chief operatives in the Caucasus and grew closer to Lenin, who saw him as tough, loyal, and capable of getting things done behind the scenes. Stalin played a decisive role in engineering the 1921 Red Army invasion of Georgia. His successes in Georgia propelled him into the ranks of the Politburo in late 1921. At the 11th Congress of the Russian Communist Party (Bolsheviks) in 1922, the leaders decided to expand the party's Central Committee. This decision led to the creation of the office of the General Secretary which Stalin assumed on 3 April. Stalin soon learned how to use his new office to gain advantages over key persons within the party. He prepared the agenda for the Politburo meetings, directing the course of meetings. As General Secretary, he appointed new local party leaders, establishing a patronage network loyal to him.

In 1922, Lenin's health was rapidly deteriorating alongside his relationship with Stalin. Lenin and Trotsky had formed a bloc alliance to counter bureaucratisation of the party and the growing influence of Stalin. Lenin wrote a pamphlet, "Lenin's Testament", urging the party to remove Stalin as General Secretary fearing his authoritarianism. When Lenin died in 1924, the party was thrown into chaos and a vicious power struggle began. Stalin, through his office as General Secretary, received advance knowledge about Lenin's Testament and sought to delay its release. Upon its release to the party, Stalin offered to resign as General Secretary, but this was rebuked to maintain the image of party unity. With his position secure, Stalin focused on consolidating his power and leveraging antagonisms among party leaders. Many were members of the Politburo, and rivalries extended beyond that. Several People's Commissars were involved in the Party's internal personal as well as political struggles. The main factions within the party included the intellectual "left wing", and the trade unionist "right wing". In this environment, Stalin painted himself as a moderate labeling his faction "the centre" while quietly building alliances with both sides in the mid-1920s.

Stalin then pivoted to focus on Trotsky. Stalin forged an alliance with fellow Old Bolsheviks to oppose Trotsky in the party apparatus. Defeating Trotsky was difficult as he had a prominent role in the October Revolution. Trotsky developed the Red Army and played an indispensable role during the Russian Civil War. Stalin feuded with Trotsky quietly, to appear as "The Golden Centre Man". Prior to the Revolution, Trotsky frequently snubbed Stalin, mocked his lack of education, and questioned his effectiveness as a revolutionary. Stalin's theory of "Socialism in One Country" was a contrast to Trotsky's "Permanent Revolution". Trotsky's downfall was swift: he was first removed as Commissar for Military and Naval Affairs (January 1925), then removed from the Politburo (October 1926), and lost his seat on the Central Committee in October 1927. Stalin expelled him from the party in November 1927, and sent him to Alma–Ata in Kazakhstan in 1928. Trotsky was expelled from the Soviet Union in February 1929, lived the rest of his life in exile, and was ultimately assassinated in August 1940. With Trotsky out of the way, Stalin then pivoted to form an alliance with the party's right wing. Using his position as General Secretary, Stalin began to fill the Soviet bureaucracy with loyalists. After Lenin's death, Stalin traveled across the USSR to deliver lectures on Leninist philosophy and began framing himself as Lenin's successor. As the 1920s progressed, Stalin used his position to expel critics, such as Bukharin, within the party and tightened his grip. Bukharin was an outspoken critic of Stalin's plans for rapid industrialization using Kulak wealth, and advocated a return to Lenin's New Economic Policy; a position that resulted in his execution. Stalin's alliance with the party's right wing ended when Stalin decided to proceed with the First Five Year Plan, abandoning the New Economic Policy. Stalin defeated his opponents within the party by 1928, ending internal power struggles. From 1929 onwards Stalin's leadership over the party and state was established and he remained undisputed leader of the USSR until his death.

== Background ==
Before his 1913-1917 exile in Siberia, Stalin was one of the Bolshevik operatives in the Caucasus, organizing cells, spreading propaganda, and raising money through criminal activities. Stalin also formed the Outfit, a rebel group that were involved with armed robberies, racketeering, assassinations, arms procurement and child couriering. According to Montefiore, Stalin socialised with hitmen "Kamo and Tsintsadze" but issued formal commands to the rest of the Outfit members through his bodyguard. Stalin eventually earned a place in Lenin's inner circle and the highest echelons of the Bolshevik hierarchy. His pseudonym, Stalin, means "man of the steel hand". The October Revolution took place in the Russian capital of Petrograd on 7 November 1917 (O.S. 25 October 1917), which saw the transfer of all political power to the Soviets.

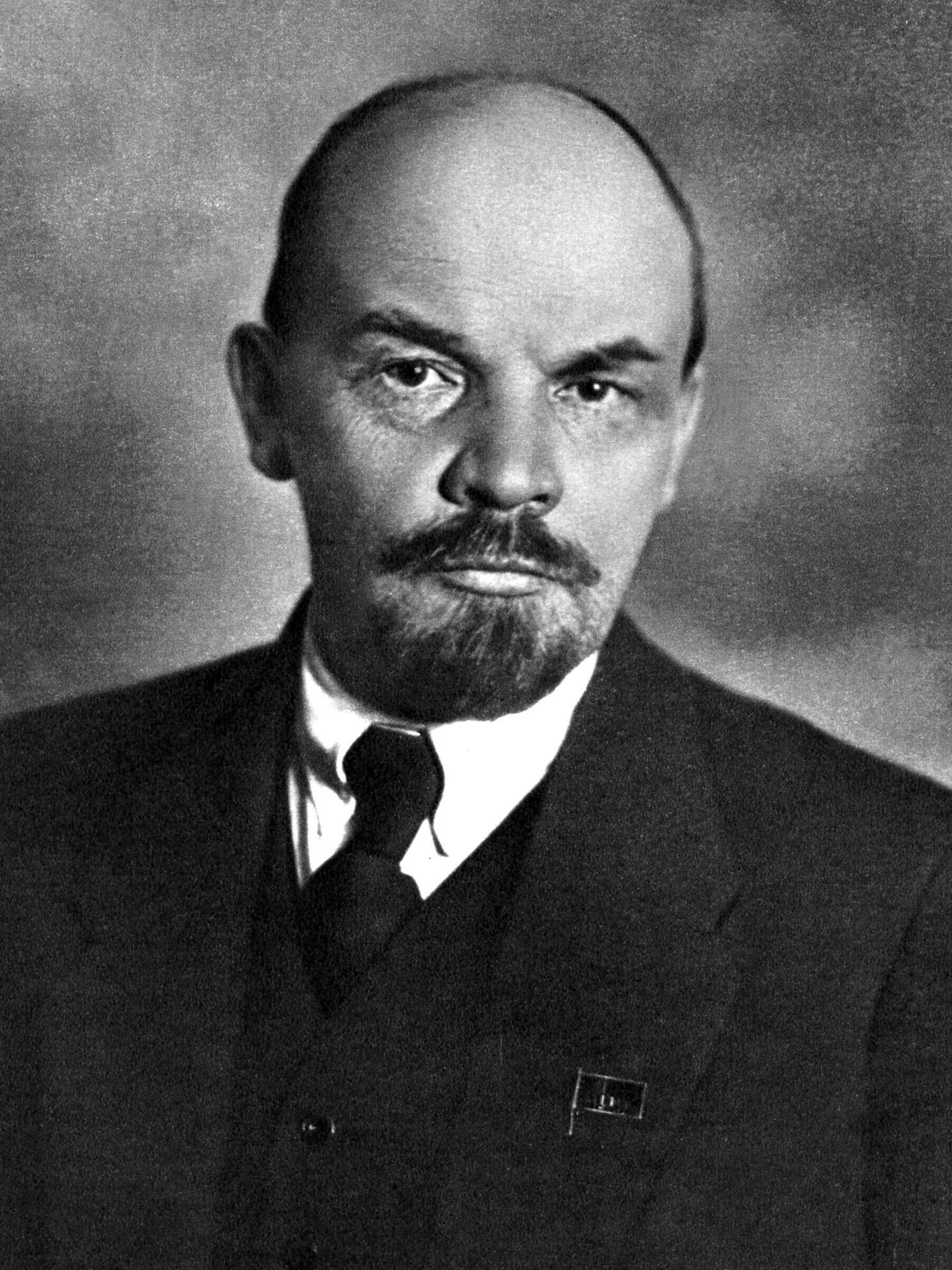
Vladimir Lenin, founder of the Soviet Union and the leader of the Bolshevik party

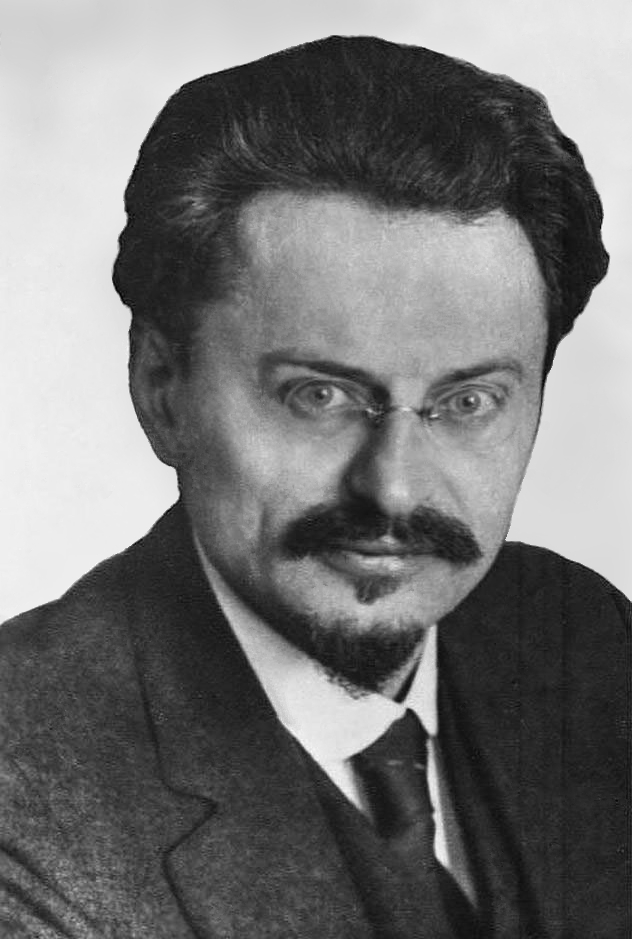
Leon Trotsky, founder of the Red Army and a key figure in the October Revolution

In the Russian Civil War that followed, Stalin forged connections with various Red Army generals and eventually acquired military powers of his own. He brutally suppressed counter-revolutionaries and bandits. After winning the Civil War, the Bolsheviks moved to expand the Revolution into Europe, starting with Poland, which was fighting the Red Army in Ukraine. As joint commander of an army in Ukraine and later in Poland itself, Stalin's actions in the war were later criticized by many, including Leon Trotsky.

== Invasion of Georgia and General Secretary ==
In late 1920, with the crises in society following the Russian Civil War, Trotsky argued for the trade unions to be incorporated more and more into the workers' state, and for the workers' state to completely control the industrial sectors. Lenin's position was one where the trade unions were subordinate to the workers' state, but separate, with Lenin accusing Trotsky of "bureaucratically nagging the trade unions". Fearing a backlash from the trade unions, Lenin asked Stalin to build a support base in the Workers' and Peasants' Inspectorate (Rabkrin) against bureaucratism. Lenin's faction eventually prevailed at the Tenth Party Congress in March 1921. Frustrated by the squabbling factions within the Communist Party during what he saw as a time of crisis, Lenin convinced the Tenth Congress to pass a ban on any opposition to official Central Committee policy (the Ban on Factions, a law which Stalin would later exploit to expel his enemies).

Stalin played a decisive role in engineering the Red Army invasion of Georgia in February and March 1921, at a time when Georgia was the biggest Menshevik stronghold. Following the invasion, Stalin adopted particularly hardline, centralist policies towards Soviet Georgia, which included severe repression of opposition to the Bolsheviks, and to opposition within the local Communist Party (e.g., the Georgian Affair of 1922), not to mention any manifestations of anti-Sovietism (the August Uprising of 1924). It was in the Georgian affairs that Stalin first began to play his own hand. Lenin, however, disliked Stalin's policy towards Georgia, as he believed that all Soviet states should be on equal standing with Russia, rather than be absorbed and subordinated to Russia.

Grigory Zinoviev successfully had Stalin appointed to the post of General Secretary in March 1922, with Stalin officially starting in the post on 3 April 1922. Stalin still held his posts in the Orgburo, the Workers' and Peasants' Inspectorate and the Commissariat for Nationalities Affairs, though he agreed to delegate his workload to subordinates. With this power, he would steadily place his supporters in positions of authority.

== Lenin's retirement and death ==
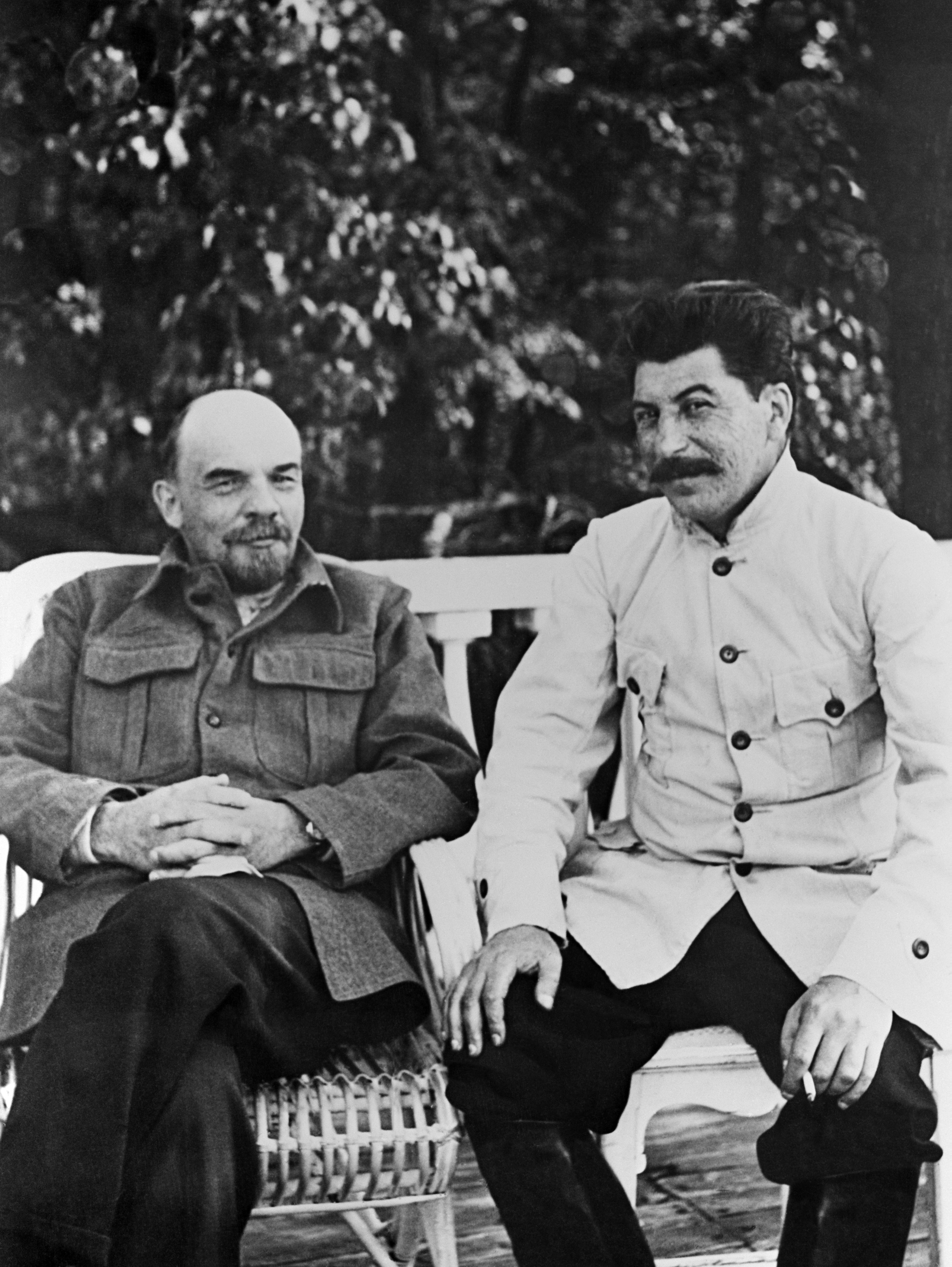
Stalin visiting the ailing Lenin at his dacha in Gorki in 1922

On 25 May 1922, Lenin suffered a stroke while recovering from surgery to remove a bullet lodged in his neck since a failed assassination attempt in August 1918. Severely debilitated, he went into semi-retirement and moved to his dacha in Gorki. After this, prominent Bolsheviks were concerned about who would take over if Lenin actually died. Lenin and Trotsky had more of a personal and theoretical relationship, while Lenin and Stalin had more of a political and apparatical relationship. Yet, Stalin visited Lenin often, acting as his intermediary with the outside world. During this time, the two quarrelled over economic policy and how to consolidate the Soviet republics. One day, Stalin verbally swore at Lenin's wife, Nadezhda Krupskaya, for breaching Politburo orders by helping Lenin communicate with Trotsky and others about politics; this greatly offended Lenin. As their relationship deteriorated, Lenin dictated increasingly disparaging notes on Stalin in what would become his testament.

The veracity of Lenin dictating the writing of this letter has been disputed. Historian Stephen Kotkin assesses that Krupskaya, working in tandem with Trotsky, may have written it in an effort to discredit Stalin and remove him from his role in the government. However, most historians consider the document to be an accurate reflection of Lenin's views. Various historians have also cited Lenin's proposal to appoint Trotsky as a Vice-chairman of the Soviet Union as evidence that he intended Trotsky to be his successor as head of government.

According to historian Geoffrey Roberts, none of the Soviet figures questioned the authenticity of the document at the time. He noted that Stalin himself quoted the full passage of the testament and commented that "Indeed I am rude, Comrades, to those who rudely and perfidiously destroy and split the party. I have not hidden this, and still do not". The memorandum contains information criticizing Stalin's rude manners, excessive power, ambition, and politics, and suggested that Stalin should be removed from the position of General Secretary. One of Lenin's secretaries showed Stalin the notes, whose contents shocked him. On 9 March 1923, Lenin suffered his most debilitating stroke, which ended his political career.

During Lenin's semi-retirement, Stalin forged a triumvirate alliance with Lev Kamenev and Grigory Zinoviev in May 1922, against Trotsky. These allies prevented Lenin's Testament from being revealed to the Twelfth Party Congress in April 1923. Although Zinoviev and Kamenev were disconcerted by Stalin's power and some of his policies, they needed Stalin's help in opposing Trotsky's faction and to prevent Trotsky's possible succession to Lenin in a power struggle.

Lenin died on 21 January 1924. Stalin was given the honour of organizing his funeral. Upon Lenin's death, Stalin was officially hailed as his successor as the leader of the ruling Communist Party and of the Soviet Union itself. Against Lenin's wishes, he was given a lavish funeral and his body was embalmed and put on display. Thanks to Kamenev and Zinoviev's influence, the Central Committee decided that Lenin's Testament should not be made public. At the Thirteenth Party Congress in May 1924, it was read out only to the heads of the provincial delegations. Trotsky did not want to appear divisive so soon after Lenin's death and did not seize the opportunity to demand Stalin's removal.

According to Stalin's secretary, Boris Bazhanov, Stalin was jubilant over Lenin's death while "publicly putting on the mask of grief".

== Downfall of Trotsky ==
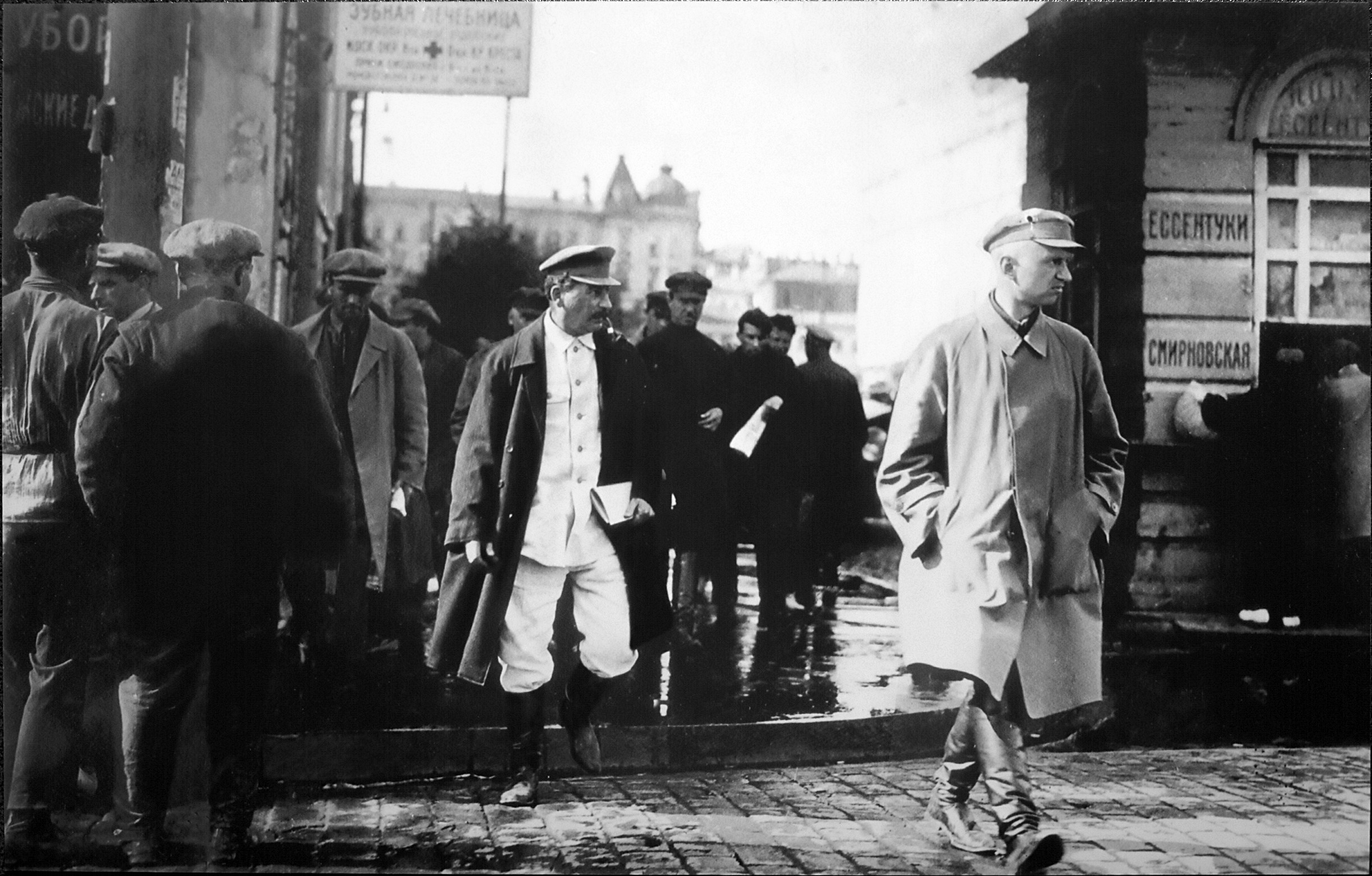
Stalin walks in the streets of Moscow, 1930.

In the months following Lenin's death, Stalin's disputes with Zinoviev and Kamenev intensified. While the triumvirate remained intact throughout 1924 and the early months of 1925, Zinoviev and Kamenev did not regard Stalin highly as a revolutionary theorist, and often disparaged him in private even as they had aided him publicly against Trotsky and the Left Opposition. For his part, Stalin was cautious about where the political situation was heading and often felt that Zinoviev's volatile rhetoric against Trotsky was going too far, especially when Zinoviev demanded Trotsky's expulsion from the Communist Party in January 1925. Stalin opposed Zinoviev's demand and skillfully played the role of a moderate. At this time, Stalin was allying himself more and more with Nikolai Bukharin and the Right Opposition, whom Stalin had promoted to the Politburo at the Thirteenth Party Congress. Stalin proposed the theory of Socialism in One Country in October 1924, which Bukharin soon elaborated upon to give it a theoretical justification. Zinoviev and Kamenev suddenly found themselves in a minority at the Fourteenth Party Conference in April 1925, over their belief that socialism could only be achieved internationally, which resulted in the triumvirate splitting up. This saw a strengthening of Stalin's alliance with Bukharin.

According to Rogovin, Zinoviev would later lambast Stalin with the words, "Does comrade Stalin know what gratitude is?", as a reminder that Kamenev and himself had saved him from political downfall with the censure of Lenin's testament during the Thirteenth Congress. Stalin responded with the words: "But of course I know, I know very well - it's an illness that afflicts dogs".

By 1925, Trotsky's foreign policy was disgraced. All revolutionary movements in Germany and elsewhere had failed. Moreover, these attempted revolutions led to an anti-communist atmosphere which fueled the rise of fascism in Western Europe. However, Trotsky's opposition and criticism of the ruling troika received support from several, Central Committee members of foreign communist parties. This included Christian Rakovsky, Chairman of the Ukraine Sovnarkom, Boris Souvarine of the French Communist Party and the Central Committee of the Polish Communist Party which was led by prominent theoreticians such as Maksymilian Horwitz, Maria Koszutska and Adolf Warski.

According to political scientist Baruch Knei-Paz, Trotsky's theory of "permanent revolution" was grossly misrepresented by Stalin as defeatist and adventurist during the succession struggle when in fact Trotsky encouraged revolutions in Europe but was not at any time proposing "reckless confrontations" with the capitalist world. With Trotsky mostly sidelined with a persistent illness during 1925, Zinoviev and Kamenev then formed the New Opposition against Stalin. At the Fourteenth Party Congress in December 1925, Stalin openly attacked Kamenev and Zinoviev, revealing that they had asked for his aid in expelling Trotsky from the Communist Party. Stalin's revelation made Zinoviev, in particular, very unpopular with many inside the Communist Party. Trotsky remained silent throughout this Congress. In early 1926, Zinoviev and Kamenev drew closer to Trotsky and the Left Opposition, forming an alliance that became known as the United Opposition. The United Opposition demanded, among other things, greater freedom of expression within the Communist Party and less bureaucracy. In October 1926, Stalin's supporters voted Trotsky out of the Politburo.

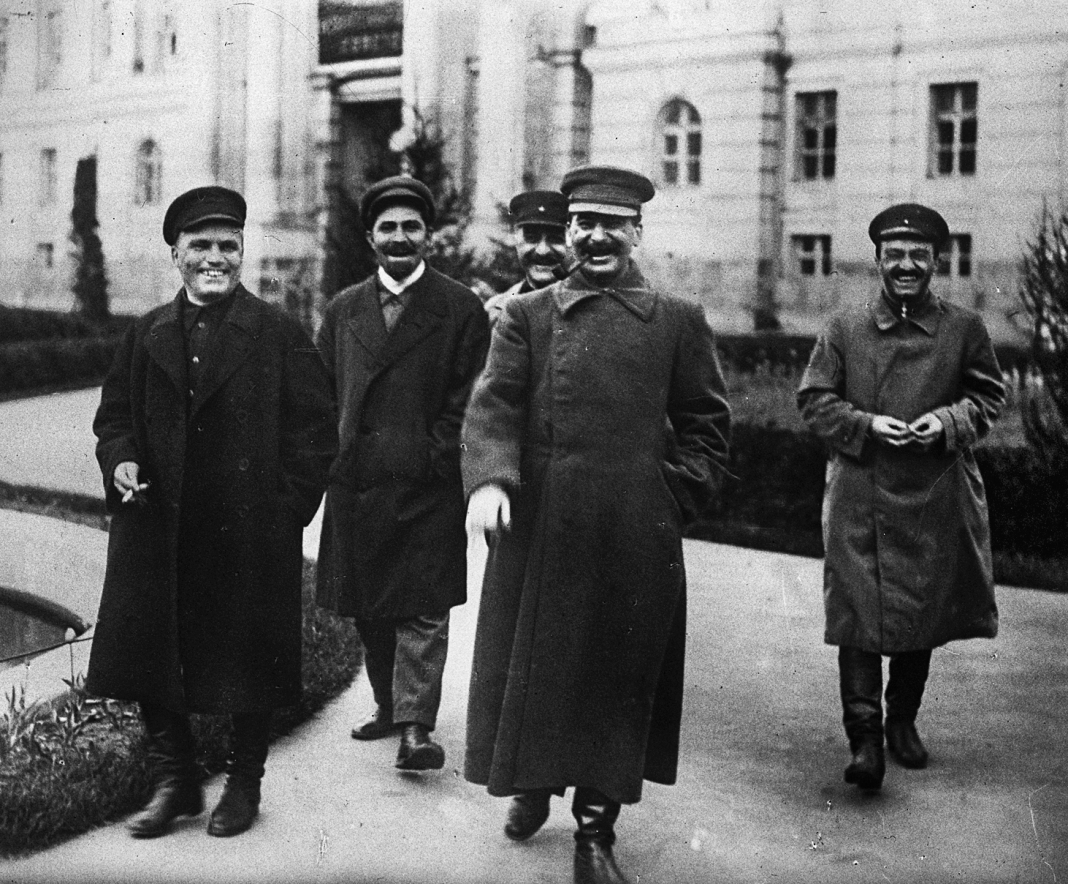
Sergei Kirov, Lazar Kaganovich, Sergo Ordzhonikidze, Josef Stalin, and Anastas Mikoyan on the Kremlin grounds after the May Day parade in 1932

During the years of 1926 and 1927, Soviet policy toward the revolution in China became the ideological line of demarcation between Stalin and the United Opposition. The 1911 Revolution began on 10 October 1911, resulting in the abdication of the Chinese Emperor, Puyi, on 12 February 1912. Sun Yat-sen established the Republic of China. In reality, however, the Republic controlled very little of the country. Much of China was divided between various regional warlords. The Republican government established a new "nationalist people's army and a national people's party" — the Kuomintang. In 1920, the Kuomintang opened relations with Soviet Russia. With Soviet help, the Republic of China built up the nationalist people's army. With the development of the nationalist army, a Northern Expedition was planned to smash the power of the warlords of the northern part of the country. This Northern Expedition became a point of contention over foreign policy by Stalin and Trotsky. Stalin tried to persuade the small Chinese Communist Party to merge with the Kuomintang (KMT) Nationalists to bring about a bourgeois revolution before attempting to bring about a Soviet-style working-class revolution. Stalin believed that the KMT bourgeoisie, together with all patriotic national liberation forces in the country, would defeat the western imperialists in China.

"He is an unprincipled intriguer, who subordinates everything to the preservation of his own power. He changes his theory according to whom he needs to get rid of."

— Bukharin in conversations with Kamenev on Stalin's theoretical position, 1928.

Trotsky wanted the Communist Party to complete an orthodox proletarian revolution and have clear class independence from the KMT. Stalin funded the KMT during the expedition. Stalin countered Trotskyist criticism by making a secret speech in which he said that Chiang's right-wing Kuomintang were the only ones capable of defeating the imperialists, that Chiang Kai-shek had funding from the rich merchants, and that his forces were to be utilized until squeezed for all usefulness like a lemon before being discarded. However, Chiang quickly reversed the tables in the Shanghai massacre of April 1927 by massacring the Communist Party in Shanghai midway through the Northern Expedition.

While the catastrophic events in China completely vindicated Trotsky's criticism of Stalin's approach towards the revolution in China, this paled in significance compared to the demoralization that the Soviet masses felt at such a big setback for socialist revolution in China, with this demoralization aiding Stalin and his allies in the Communist Party and the Soviet state. Attacks against the United Opposition increased in volatility and ferocity. Many supporters of Kamenev and Zinoviev's group, as well as most from the Workers Opposition grouping, had left the United Opposition by mid-1927, changing sides under the growing political pressure and espousing their support for Stalin. Trotsky, Kamenev and Zinoviev grew increasingly isolated and were ejected from the Central Committee in October 1927. Days later, one of the signatories of The Declaration of 46, Varvara Yakovleva, decided to leave the Opposition, after four years, as a result of the ever greater pressure being applied on members of the Opposition by the Stalin led government and by the OGPU.

On 7 November 1927, on the tenth anniversary of the October Revolution, the United Opposition held a demonstration in Red Square, Moscow, which included Vladimir Lenin's widow, Nadezhda Krupskaya. On 12 November 1927, Trotsky and Zinoviev were expelled from the Communist Party itself, followed by Kamenev at the Fifteenth Party Congress in December 1927. At the Congress, Stalin announced during his speech that Lenin's widow, Nadezhda Krupskaya, had abandoned the Opposition. Kamenev acted as the United Opposition's spokesman at the Congress due to Trotsky's and Zinoviev's expulsion, but the United Opposition were unable to gain the support of more than a small minority of the Communist Party. They were then expelled after the Congress declared United Opposition views to be incompatible with Communist Party membership.

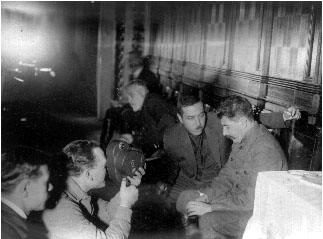
Stalin during a speech with a member of Central Executive Committee of the Soviet Union (Gazanfar Musabekov) in 1928

While Trotsky remained firm in his opposition to Stalin after his expulsion from the Communist Party and his subsequent exile, Zinoviev and Kamenev capitulated almost immediately and called on their supporters to follow suit. They wrote open letters acknowledging their mistakes and were readmitted to the Communist Party in June 1928, after a six-month cooling-off period. They never regained their Central Committee seats, but they were given mid-level positions within the Soviet bureaucracy. Kamenev and Zinoviev were courted by Bukharin at the beginning of his short and ill-fated struggle with Stalin in the summer of 1928. This activity was soon reported to Stalin and was later used against Bukharin as proof of his factionalism. Trotsky, firmer than ever in his opposition to Stalin, was exiled to Alma-Ata in January 1928 and was exiled from the Soviet Union itself in February 1929, sent into exile in Turkey. From his exile, Trotsky continued to oppose Stalin, right up until Trotsky was assassinated in Mexico on Stalin's orders in August 1940.

== Stalin turns on the Right ==
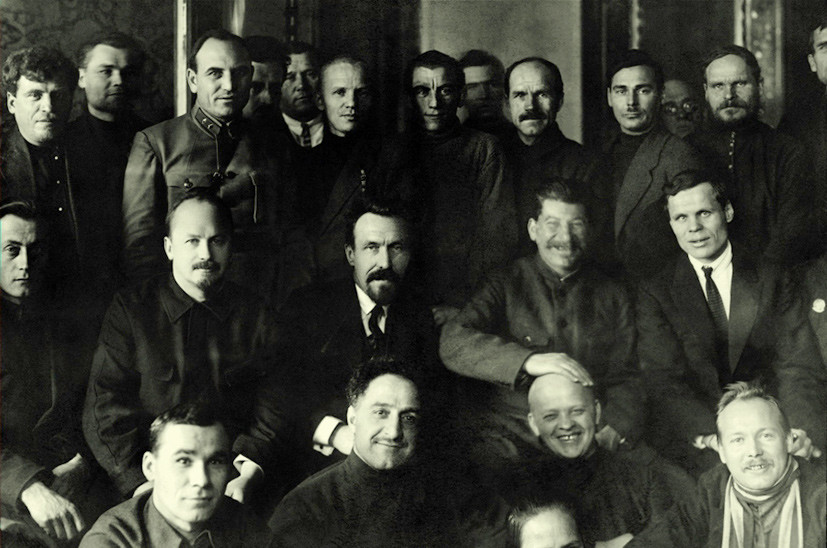
Stalin with Nikolay Bukharin and Alexey Rykov during 12th Party Congress (Lower row, middle: Ordzhonikidze and Kosior, Upper row, second from right: Eikhe

External videos
- An example of Stalin's speech. His muffled, low and hushed voice can be heard clearly

After the United Opposition was prohibited in December 1927, the Kulaks and NEPmen were emboldened and exerted much greater economic pressure on the Soviet government in the months afterwards. In January 1928, Stalin personally travelled to Siberia where he oversaw the seizure of grain stockpiles from Kulak farmers. Many in the Communist Party supported the seizures, but Bukharin and Premier Rykov were outraged. Bukharin criticized Stalin's plans for rapid industrialization financed by Kulak wealth, and advocated a return to Lenin's NEP. Bukharin was unable to rally sufficient support from the higher levels of the Communist Party to oppose Stalin. By the latter months of 1928, a critical shortfall in grain supplies prompted Stalin to push for collectivisation of agriculture. Stalin began pushing for more rapid industrialisation and central control of the economy, a position which alienated Bukharin and the Right Opposition, but which appeared close to what the Left Opposition had advocated before they were banned. Stalin accused Bukharin of factionalism and capitalist tendencies. The other Politburo members sided with Stalin, and labelled Bukharin a "Right Deviationist" from Marxist–Leninist principles. Bukharin was ejected from the Politburo in November 1929.

Stalin's agricultural policies were also criticized by fellow Politburo member Mikhail Kalinin. In the summer of 1930, Stalin exposed Kalinin's embezzlement of state funds, which he spent on a mistress. Kalinin begged forgiveness and effectively submitted himself to Stalin. In September 1930, Stalin proposed dismissing Premier Rykov, who was Bukharin's fellow oppositionist. The other Politburo members agreed with Stalin, and supported his nomination of Vyacheslav Molotov. On 19 December, the Central Committee dismissed Rykov and replaced him with Molotov.

After 1930, open criticism of Stalin within the Communist Party was virtually non-existent, though Stalin continued to hunt for discreet dissenters. Stalin dominated the Politburo (the policy-making branch of the Communist Party) through staunch allies such as Sergo Ordzhonikidze, Lazar Kaganovich, Vyacheslav Molotov, Kliment Voroshilov, and Sergei Kirov.

== The Great Terror ==
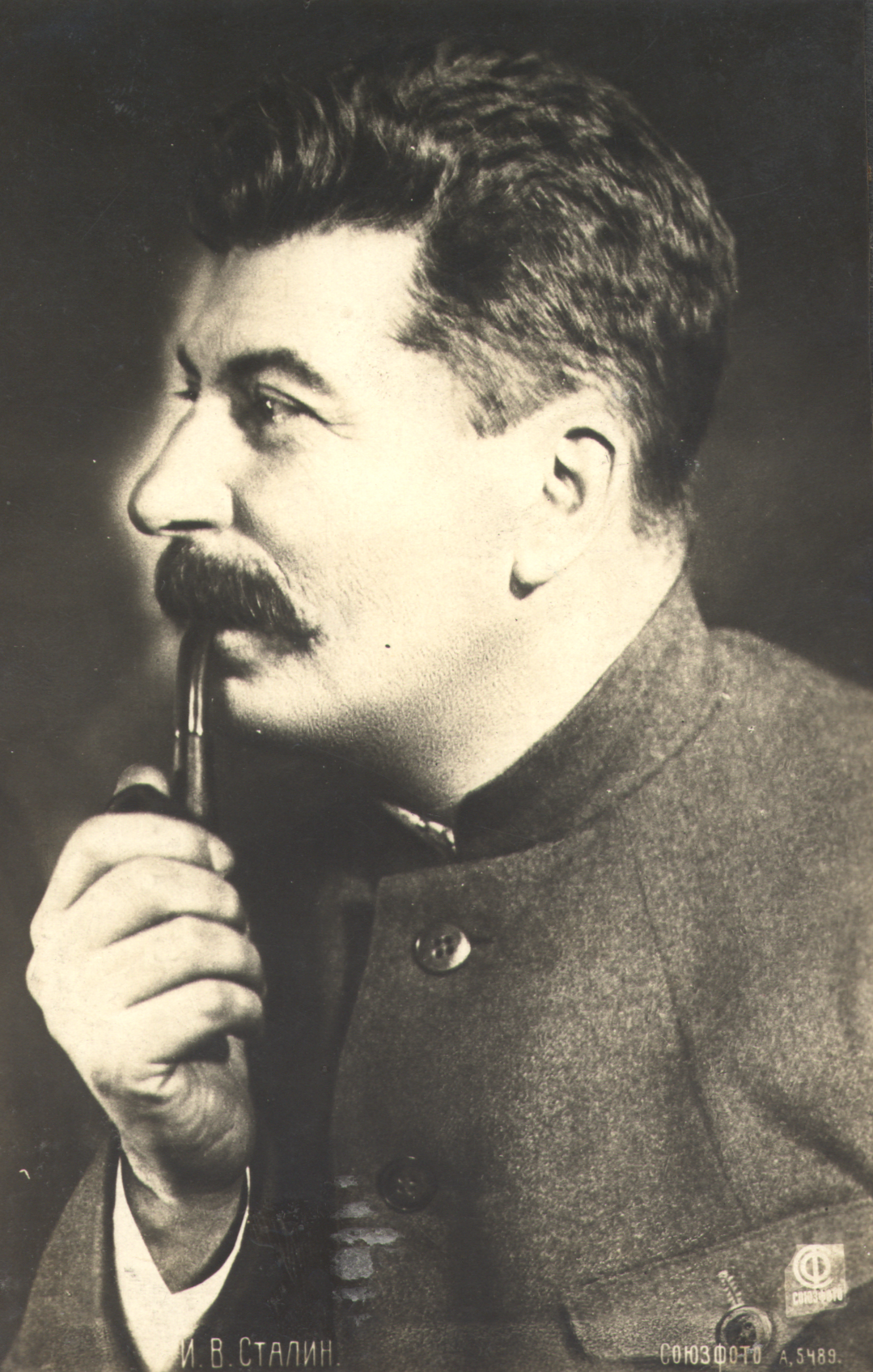
Stalin in 1935

On 1 December 1934, Sergei Kirov was murdered by Leonid Nikolaev. The death of this popular, high-profile politician shocked Russia, and Stalin used this murder to begin the Great Terror. Within hours of Kirov's death, Stalin declared Grigory Zinoviev and his supporters to be responsible for Kirov's murder. Lev Kamenev and Zinoviev were arrested and, to escape long prison sentences, confessed to political and moral responsibility for Kirov's murder. In January 1935, Zinoviev was sentenced to 10 years imprisonment, and Kamenev was sentenced to 5 years imprisonment. Stalin sanctioned the formation of troikas for the purpose of extrajudicial punishment. In April 1935, Kamenev's prison sentence was increased by another 5 years, to a total of 10 years imprisonment. Hundreds of oppositionists linked to Kamenev and Zinoviev were arrested and exiled to Siberia. In late 1935, Stalin reopened the case. Kamenev and Zinoviev were interrogated again, and the exiled Trotsky was now accused of being the leading mastermind in Kirov's murder. As claimed by Montefiore, in July 1936, Stalin promised Kamenev and Zinoviev (through NKVD chief, Genrikh Yagoda) that there would be no executions or persecution of their families if they confessed to conspiring with Trotsky. Stalin's promise was soon broken. A few weeks later, after a trial, Kamenev and Zinoviev were both executed on 25 August 1936.

Spearheading Stalin's purges was a commissar called Nikolai Yezhov, a fervent Stalinist and a believer in violent repression. Yezhov continued to expand the lists of suspects to include all the old oppositionists as well as entire nationalities, such as the Poles.

Stalin distrusted the Soviet secret police – the NKVD – which was filled with Old Bolsheviks and ethnicities he distrusted, such as Poles, Jews, and Latvians. In September 1936, Stalin fired the head of the NKVD, Yagoda, and replaced him with the more aggressive and zealous Yezhov, with Yezhov overseeing the most brutally oppressive period of Stalin's Great Purge from late 1936 to late 1938.

In June 1937, The Case of the Trotskyist Anti-Soviet Military Organization took place. Marshal Mikhail Tukhachevsky and the senior Red Army military officers Iona Yakir, Ieronim Uborevich, Robert Eideman, August Kork, Vitovt Putna, Boris Feldman, and Vitaly Primakov (as well as Yakov Gamarnik, who committed suicide before the investigations began) were accused of anti-Soviet conspiracy and sentenced to death; they were executed on the night of 11 to 12 June 1937, immediately after the verdict delivered by a Special Session (специальное судебное присутствие) of the Supreme Court of the USSR. The Tribunal was presided over by Vasili Ulrikh and included marshals Vasily Blyukher, Semyon Budyonny and Army Commanders Yakov Alksnis, Boris Shaposhnikov, Ivan Panfilovich Belov, Pavel Dybenko, and Nikolai Kashirin. Only Ulrikh, Budyonny, and Shaposhnikov would survive the purges that followed. The Tukhachevsky trial triggered a massive subsequent purge of the Red Army. In September 1938, the People's Commissar for Defence, Voroshilov, reported that a total of 37,761 officers and commissars were dismissed from the army, 10,868 were arrested and 7,211 were condemned for anti-Soviet crimes.

Since his falling out with Stalin in 1928–1929, Bukharin had written an endless stream of letters of repentance and admiration to Stalin. However, Stalin knew that Bukharin's repentance was insincere, as in private Bukharin continued to criticize Stalin and seek out other opponents of Stalin (the NKVD wiretapped Bukharin's telephone). Shortly before their executions in August 1936, Kamenev and Zinoviev had denounced Bukharin as a traitor during their trial. At the December 1936 plenum of the Central Committee, Yezhov accused Bukharin and Alexei Rykov of treachery. Bukharin and Rykov confessed to conspiring against Stalin and were executed on 15 March 1938, on the same day that former NKVD chief, Yagoda, was also executed.

Stalin eventually turned on Yezhov. He appointed Yezhov as Commissar of Water Transport in April 1938 (a similar demotion had happened to Yezhov's predecessor, Yagoda, shortly before he was fired). Stalin began ordering the executions of Yezhov's protégés in the NKVD. Politburo members also started to openly condemn the excesses of the NKVD under Yezhov's leadership, all of which gave the signal that Yezhov was falling from Stalin's favour. Yezhov eventually suffered a nervous breakdown and resigned as NKVD chief on 23 November 1938. Yezhov was replaced as NKVD chief by Lavrentiy Beria. Yezhov was executed on 4 February 1940.

According to Trotskyist historian Vadim Rogovin, Stalin also had suppressed thousands of foreign communists capable of leading socialist change in their respective countries. Sixteen members of the Central Committee of the German Communist Party became victims of Stalinist terror. Repressive measures were also enforced upon the Hungarian, Yugoslav, and Polish Communist Parties.

== Historiography ==
In Western historiography, Stalin is considered one of the worst and most notorious figures in modern history. Biographer and historian Isaac Deutscher highlighted the totalitarian character of Stalinism and its suppression of "socialist inspiration". His ability to assume absolute power has remained a subject of historical debate. Some historians have attributed his success primarily to his personal qualities. Contrarily, certain political theorists such as Trotsky have emphasised the role of external conditions in facilitating the growth of a Soviet bureaucracy which served as a power base for Stalin, in particular the revolution remaining isolated and not spreading internationally, which strengthened the bureaucracy and Stalin's power inside the Soviet Union itself. Other historians have regarded the premature deaths of prominent Bolsheviks such as Vladimir Lenin and Yakov Sverdlov to have been key factors in his elevation to the position of leadership in the Soviet Union. In part, because Sverdlov served as the original chairman of the party secretariat and was considered a natural candidate for the position of General Secretary.

Trotsky attributed Stalin's appointment to the position of General Secretary in 1922 to the initial recommendation of Zinoviev. This view has been supported by several historians. According to Russian historian, Vadim Rogovin, Stalin's election to the position occurred after the Eleventh Party Congress (March–April 1922), in which Lenin, due to his poor health, participated only sporadically, and only attended four of the twelve sessions of the Congress.

== Bibliography ==
- Montefiore, Simon Sebag (2003). Stalin: The Court of the Red Tsar. New York: Knopf. ISBN 978-0-7538-1766-7.
- Montefiore, Simon Sebag (2007). Young Stalin. New York: Knopf. ISBN 978-1400044658.
- Service, Robert (2004). Stalin: A Biography. New York: Belknap Press. ISBN 978-0-330-41913-0.
