= Union of Town and Country Proletariat =

Political organisation in inter-war Poland

- Związek Proletariatu Miast i Wsi; Ukrainian: Союз пролетарату міст і сіл; Yiddish: פֿארבאנד פון די פּראלעטאריאט פון שטאט און לאנד
- Abbreviation: ZPMiW (Ukrainian: СПМіС)
- Merged into: Ukrainian Social Democratic Party
- Formation: August 1922
- Dissolved: 1925
- Location: Second Polish Republic
- Chairman: Stanisław Łańcucki
- Vice Chairman: Szczepan Rybacki
- Secretary: Jakub Dutlinger
- Publication: Undzer Cajtung, Proletariat, Trybuna Robotnicza
- Parent organisation: KPRP
- Affiliations: USDP

The Union of Town and Country Proletariat (Polish: Związek Proletariatu Miast i Wsi, abbreviated ZPMiW, Ukrainian: Союз пролетарату міст і сіл, abbreviated СПМіС, Yiddish: פֿארבאנד פון די פּראלעטאריאט פון שטאט און לאנד) was a political organization in the Second Polish Republic. ZPMiW was founded in August 1922, initially mainly as a platform for the Communist Workers Party of Poland (KPRP) to contest the 1922 elections. The organization was led by a Central Electoral Committee, with Stanisław Łańcucki as its chairman, Jakub Dutlinger as its secretary and Szczepan Rybacki serving as its vice chairman and treasurer.

== 1922 elections ==
KPRP and the minority wing of Communist Party of Eastern Galicia took part in the 1922 elections through ZPMiW. 77 local electoral committees of ZPMiW were set up across the country. The ZPMiW list for the November 5, 1922 Sejm election had the number 5.

=== Electoral programme ===
Ahead of the November 1922 elections, the Central Electoral Committee of ZPMiW issued an appeal in August 1922. This electoral platform outlined the objectives of the movement; calling for the creation of a united front of the proletariat to struggle against the bourgeoisie. The appeal called for the creation of a socialist republic whose government would represent the interests of the urban and rural proletariat, socialization of industries, mines and natural resources and the expropriation of courtly, church-owned or monastic lands for redistribution to the workers. The appeal condemned the national chauvinism and antisemitism of the National Democracy bloc. ZPMiW called for full freedom for German and Jewish minorities for cultural development, calling for the end to discrimination against the national minorities in education, administration and the judiciary. It demanded establishment of trade relations with Soviet Russia and Soviet Ukraine. The appeal included calls for the creation of a Polish Socialist Republic and a World Federation of Socialist Republics.

=== The ZPMiW press ===
ZPMiW conducted out extensive publishing activities and printed significant amounts of propaganda materials, in spite of repetitive confiscations by the government authorities. As ZPMiW was a legal, over-ground organization the KPRP tasked it to conduct the press publishing activities on behalf of the underground party. KPRP established a clandestine 'Central Editorial Office' after its 3rd conference held in April 1922. This Central Editorial Office oversaw the publishing of the ZPMiW press. The Central Editorial Office consisted of five members: Izaak Gordin/Aleksander Lenowicz, Franciszek Fiedler, Szczepan Rybacki, Jerzy Heryng and Jan Hempel, all central KPRP cadres. However, as publishers and editors of the ZPMiW press, the organization generally used names of individuals not publicly associated with the KPRP, such as Szymon Tenenbaum, Gustaw Pirutin, Alter Goldman (Lucjan Marek), J. Sroka, Mikołaj Szurkowski, Józef Zawadka, Szyja Koszewnik and Edmund Mączewski.

During the course of the lead-up to the 1922 elections, ZPMiW published a total of 17 short-lived newspapers. Twelve of the periodicals were issued from the Warsaw headquarters of ZPMiW and two from the East Galicia Central Electoral Committee of ZPMiW. The first ZPMiW organ to appear was the Yiddish language weekly Undzer Cajtung, which began publishing in the second half of August 1922.

The thrice-weekly newspaper Proletariat was launched as the central organ of ZPMiW. Estera Stróżecka served as the editor of Proletariat, under the alias 'Maria Lewińska'. Ryback, who was a known communist cadre, was the publisher of Proletariat. The publishing of Proletariat was delayed, as Warsaw government authorities were suspicious that it would be an organ of the illegal KPRP. In the end three issues were published, dated September 27, September 29 and October 1, 1922. The Proletariat coverage on the election mainly focused on attacking PPS, the main competitor of ZPMiW for the working-class vote. The latter two issues of Proletariat were confiscated by government authorities. Krygier, Publishing and Printing Inspector of the Warsaw Government Commissariat ordered publication of Proletariat to cease publishing. Police authorities issued warnings to shops and news kiosks not to sell the publication. On October 9, 1922, the Warsaw headquarters of ZPMiW published one issue of Biuletyn Centralnego Komitetu Wyborczegoj Związku Proletariatu Miast i Wsi ('Bulletine of the Central Electoral Committee of the Union of Town and Country Proletariat') with 'Maria Lewińska' as its editor.

The central Yiddish organ of ZPMiW, Folgscajtung (transl. People's Newspaper), suffered a similar fate as Proletariat. Only two issues of Folgscajtung were published, dated September 29 and October 6, 1922. After the closure of Folgscajtung, the ZPMiW published a number of one-issue newspaper in the Yiddish language; Togfragen (transl. Daily Issues), Tognajes (transl. Daily News), Togjedijes (transl. Daily News), Cajtfragen (transl. Questions of Time) and Wałbłat (transl. Election Newspaper).

The Warsaw headquarters of ZPMiW issued four one-issue satirical publications; Miotła (transl. Broom) on October 18, Nowa Miotła (transl. New Broom) on October 29, Świeża Miotła (transl. Fresh Broom) on November 5 and Miotła Senatorska (transl. Senatorial Broom) on November 12. The satirical one-day publications mainly sought to mock the PPS.

The ZPMiW District Election Committee ZPMiW for constituency No. 6 (Covering the powiats of Grodno, Suwałki, Sejny, Augustów) published the Belorussian language newspaper Wiaskowy Proletaryj (one issue) and the Yiddish-language newspaper Undzer Cajtung (אונדזער צייטונג, transl. Our Newspaper) from Grodno. Undzer Cajtung was the longest-running ZPMiW newspaper, with its last issue being published November 2, 1922. The District Election Committee of the ZPMiW for electoral district No. 9 (covering the powiats of Płock, Sierpc, Rypin, Płońsk) published one issue of Jedność Robotniczo-Chłopska (transl. Worker-Peasant Unity). The newspaper, which was printed in Płock, was supposed to be a weekly publication.

=== In Eastern Galicia ===
The majority wing of the Communist Party of Eastern Galicia (the 'Vasyl'kivtsi') called for a boycott of the election, as did other Ukrainian parties. The minority wing of the Communist Party of Eastern Galicia (the 'Kapeerowcami'), which was close to KPRP and participated in the elections via ZPMiW, was mainly supported by Polish and Jewish urban workers The movement had a separate Central Electoral Committee for Eastern Galicia (CKW ZPMiW GW). Michajło Glińskij served as the chairman of the CKW ZPMiW GW during the parliamentary elections. Mikołaj Szurkowski was deputy chairman of CKW ZPMiW GW, Michał Feliksik its treasurer and Jan Brauła its secretary.

CKW ZPMiW GW published two newspapers; Trybuna Robotnicza ('Workers' Tribune') in Polish and Robitnycza Trybuna (Робітнича трибуна, 'Workers' Tribune') in Ukrainian. Szurkowski served as the editor of Trybuna Robotnicza, which was published from Lviv twice (October 16, October 25). A single issue of Robitnycza Trybuna, with Osip Zawadka as editor, was published on October 16. All issues of the two newspapers were partially confiscated by state authorities and their editors arrested. However, in spite of the confiscations some 1,500 copies of each publication were circulated. The young Władysław Gomułka worked with Trybuna Robotnicza.

The two CKW ZPMiW GW organs accused the Vasyl'kivtsi faction of being under influence of the Ukrainian Social-Democratic Party and that they were aligning with Ukrainian bourgeoisie for boycott of election along chauvinist lines.

=== Jewish Subcommittee ===
The Warsaw-based Central Electoral Committee of ZPMiW had a Central Jewish Subcommittee. It was led by Izaak Gordin/Aleksander Lenowicz, who was a member of Central Electoral Committee of ZPMiW. Gordin-Lenowicz had led a split in the United Jewish Socialist Workers Party in August 1922 and his group joined KPRP. The Central Jewish Subcommittee included Dawid Richter, Jakub Dutlinger, Abraham Abel Pflug, Gordin-Lenowicz and Jerzy Czeszejko-Sochacki.

=== Crackdown, arrests and confiscations ===
At a meeting of the National Election Commission on September 28, 1922, the representatives of the Polish Socialist Party (PPS) Central Electoral Committee Kazimierz Pużak and Tadeusz Tomaszewski petitioned that Commission to add the moniker 'Communist' to the name of the organization. The PPS representatives argued that the name 'ZPMiW' would risk to mislead the voters of other workers' parties. The ZPMiW representatives vehemently protested against this move. However, the National Electoral Commission approved the PPS petition and the name of ZPMiW was changed to the 'Communist Union of Town and Country Proletariat' (Komunistyczny Związek Proletariatu Miast i Wsi) in the records of the National Electoral Commission. The imposed name change provided a pretext for government authorities to disrupt the ZPMiW electoral campaign.

Following an October 2, 1922 meeting of the Council of Ministers, the Minister of Internal Affairs Antoni Kamieński issued a circular recommending paralyzing all attempts of ZPMiW agitations by not allowing any rallies and pre-election assemblies convened by the ZPMiW and the immediate confiscation of all publications of the group. In ten out of 51 electoral districts, ZPMiW was prevented from registering its candidate lists. Authorities would routinely deny permissions for ZPMiW to hold electoral rallies. In many locations local ZPMiW committees were dissolved by authorities

One month before the vote, mass arrests of ZPMiW activists took place. Over 600 ZPMiW activists arrested, including 24 out of 35 members of the Warsaw Central Electoral Committee of ZPMiW, as well as 12 out of 17 members of the Lviv Central Electoral Committee of ZPMiW GW.

As it had become impossible for ZPMiW to print electoral materials in Warsaw, by mid-October 1922 Zygmunt Trawiński was sent to help Rybacki in organizing publishing house in Kraków (with Sosnowiec as a back-up option). Trawiński managed to contact the Communist Party of Upper Silesia, with the ZPMiW Dąbrowa Basin District Electoral Committee secretary Tadeusz Żarski as his liaison, and with the help of the Upper Silesian party ZPMiW could resume printing of electoral propaganda at the Volkswille Printing House in Katowice. The propaganda leaflets were smuggled to the rest of the country via Sosnowiec, with large quantities of materials arriving in Warsaw.

=== Results ===
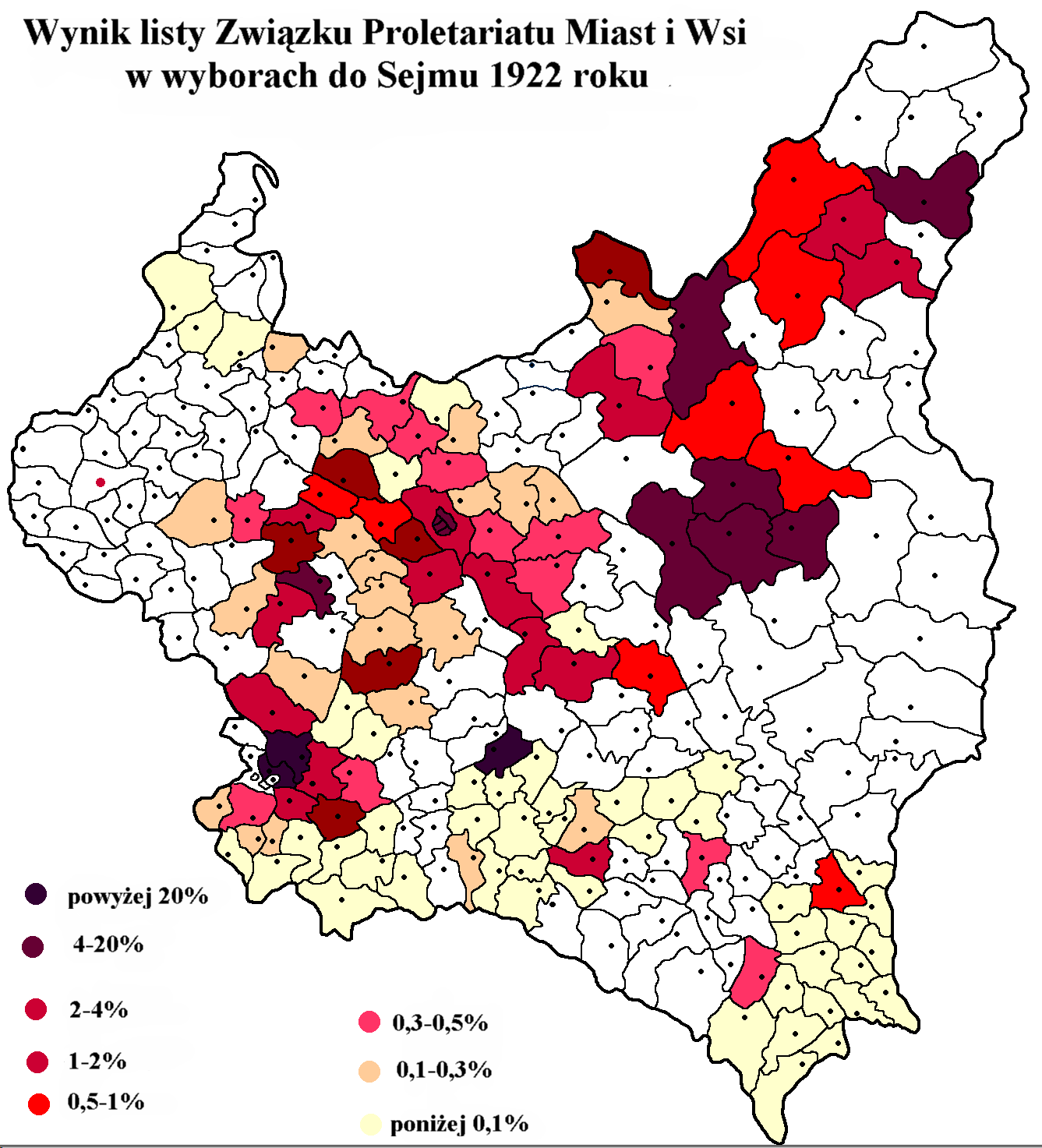
Union of Town and Country Proletariat results in the Polish legislative election, 1922

ZPMiW obtained some 132,495 votes (1.5%) in the election to the Sejm, excluding votes declared invalid. In the elections to the Senate ZPMiW obtained some 50,000 votes.

Out of the Sejm votes, ZPMiW received 26,920 votes from Warsaw, 33,606 from the Dąbrowa Basin, 12,492 from Łódź city and Łódź district 16,416. Over half of the ZPMiW vote came from these three industrial centres. By contrast the rural districts across the country provided 32,895 votes for ZPMiW – including 8,660 votes from Poleski, 6,384 votes from Tarnobrzeski and minor numbers of votes cast in Kielce, Częstochowa, Rawa-Skierniewice and other districts.

ZPMiW won two Sejm seats. The two ZPMiW deputies were Łańcucki (Dąbrowa Basin) and Stefan Królikowski (Warsaw). Through the ZPMiW parliamentary presence, KPRP managed to gain some institutional influence.

== Later period ==
Following the November 1922 election, the electoral committees of ZPMiW were rebranded as simply ZPMiW committees. The second congress of KPRP, held in 1923, instructed that under the leadership of the party the ZPMiW was to function as the legal mass organization, with a Central Committee, District Committees and Local Committees. Following the parliamentary election ZPMiW sought to build alliances with other workers parties. In rare instances ZPMiW managed to cooperate with PPS local branches, in spite of the opposition by the PPS central leadership. ZPMiW would contest city council and sickness fund elections.

In November 1924 the ZPMiW parliamentary group merged with the Ukrainian Social Democratic Club, forming the Communist Parliamentary Faction. The merger with ZPMiW caused dissent in the Ukrainian Social Democratic ranks, and in January 1925 the anti-communist group formed the Ukrainian Socialist Party (led by Czernecki, Kusznir and Panas).

ZPMiW continued to operate until 1925.
