= Janina Mortkowicz =

- Born: Żaneta Horwitz; 20 October 1875; Warsaw, Poland
- Died: 27 December 1960 (aged 85)
- Citizenship: Poland
- Occupations: novelist, translator
- Writing career
- Period: 1903−1960

Janina Mortkowicz, real name: Żaneta Mortkowicz née Horwitz (20 October 1875 – 27 December 1960) was a Polish writer, translator and bookseller.

== Biography ==
Żaneta Hortwitz was born in Warsaw, into a Jewish family, as a daughter of Gustaw Horowitz (1844–1882) and Julia née Kleinmann (1845–1912). Her paternal grandfather, Lazar, was the Chief Rabbi of Vienna. Her family changed their name to Horwitz (without “o” between “r” and “w”), when they moved from Austria to Poland. She was a sister of Maksymilian Horwitz (1877–1937) and Kamilla Kancewicz (1879–1952).

In 1903 she debuted as an author by writing a book O wychowaniu estetycznem. In 1919 she translated The Paul Street Boys from Hungarian to Polish. Janina Mortkowicz also translated to Polish Selma Lagerlöf's The Wonderful Adventures of Nils and series about Doctor Dolittle.

After her husband's suicide, she was leading his book company. During the Holocaust Janina Mortkowicz and her daughter Hanna, were hiding at the Aryan's side of Warsaw. After the war, she opened her company again and led it until 1950. In the same period, she was a president of the Książka i Wiedza company.

Janina Horwitz died on 27 December 1960 and was buried at the Rakowicki Cemetery in Kraków. She was married to Jakób Mortkowicz. Her daughter, Hanna Mortkowicz-Olczakowa was a famous writer, her granddaughter Joanna Olczak-Ronikier is also a writer and her great-granddaughter Katarzyna Zimmerer is a journalist.
