= Tadeusz Rechniewski =

Polish revolutionary

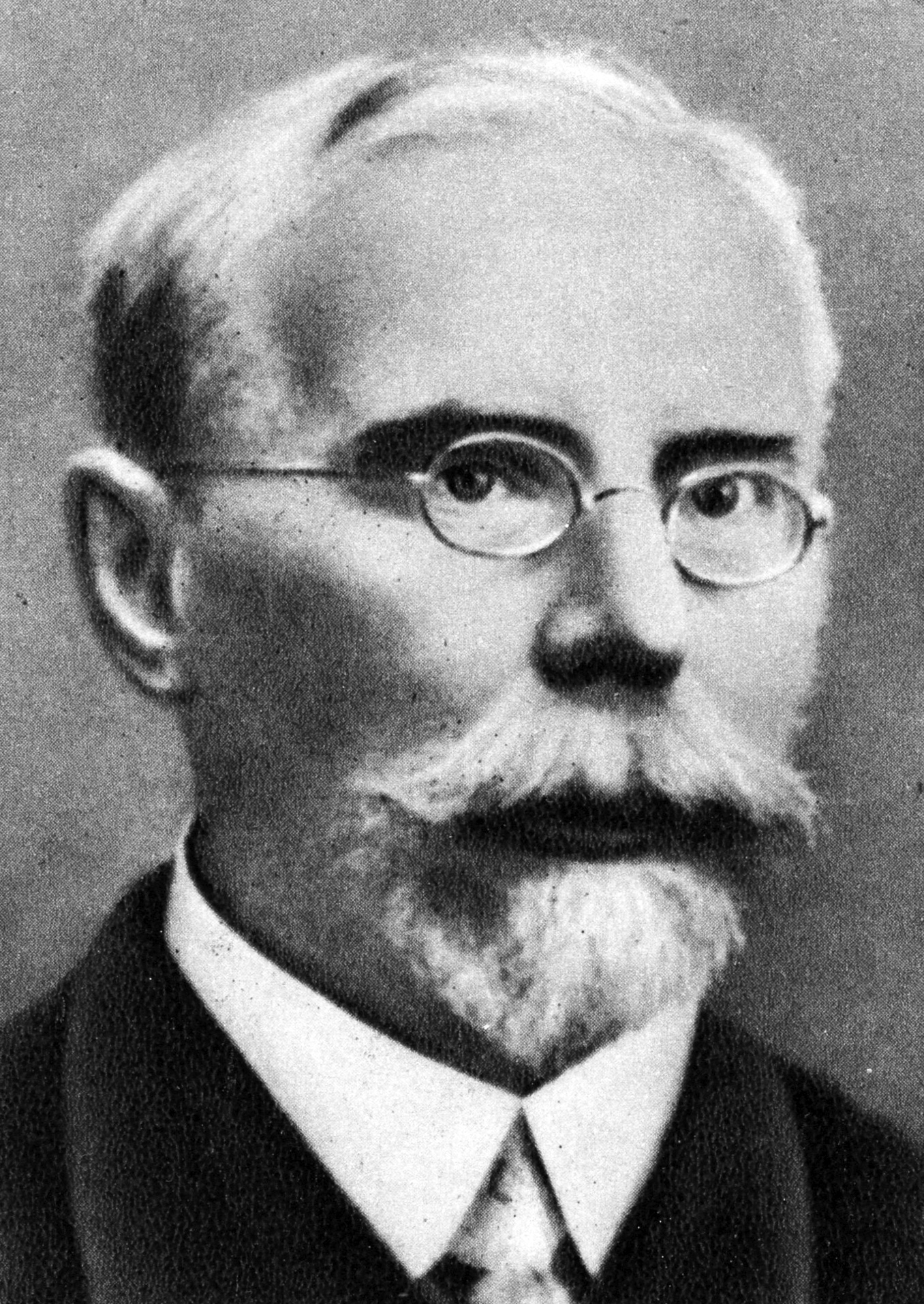
- Born: April 2, 1862; Saint Petersburg, Saint Petersburg Governorate, Russian Empire
- Died: July 21, 1916 (aged 54); Warsaw, Government General of Warsaw
- Other names: Oskar and Tarski
- Political party: PPS–L
- Other political affiliations: Narodnaya Volya; First Proletariat; PPS
- Movement: Socialism
- Criminal penalty: 14 years imprisonment
- Spouse: Witolda Rechniewska

Tadeusz Rechniewski (2 April 1862, Saint Petersburg – 21 July 1916, Warsaw) was a Polish revolutionary and one of the leaders of the First Proletariat party.

== Biography ==
Born into the nobility in St. Petersburg in 1862, Rechniewski began studying law at St. Petersburg University in 1879. There, he met members of the People's Will and Polish socialist groups, and he joined the student movement, becoming in 1883 a member of the central committee of the First Proletariat party. Rechniewski was arrested and sentenced to fourteen years in prison.

In 1886, Rechniewski arrived at the harsh Kariyskaya labor camps, where he led study sessions on Marx's Das Kapital and survived the Kariyskaya tragedy.

In 1889, Rechniewski was joined by his wife, who was helping to support political prisoners. In 1894, he was sent to settle in the Transbaikal region, where he worked as a draftsman in the construction of the Trans-Siberian Railroad. In 1901, he moved to Irkutsk, where he worked for the newspaper Eastern Review (Восточное обозрение). During all this time, he continued his revolutionary activities and organized escapes for other exiles.

During the 1905 Russian Revolution, Rechniewski was arrested for participating in rallies. After being freed, he went to Poland and became one of the leaders of the Polish Socialist Party – Left (one of the precursors of the Polish Communist Party) and editor of its organ from 1906 to 1914. In 1915, he was one of the founders of the People's University in Warsaw.
