= Andrzej Leder =

Polish cultural philosopher

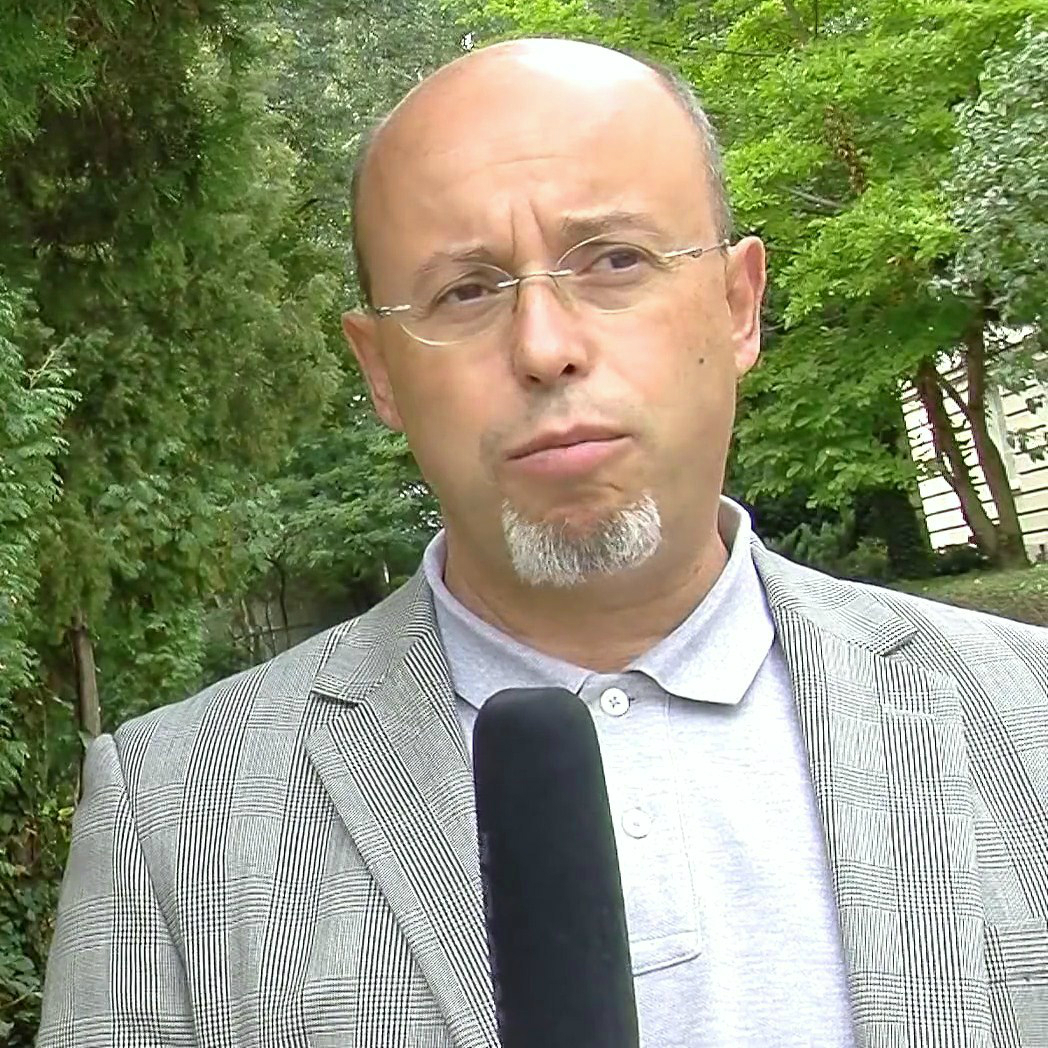
- Leder in 2012
- Born: Andrzej Władysław Leder; 1960 (age 65–66)
- Spouse: Justyna Kowalska-Leder
- Children: 1
- Parents: Witold Leder (father); Ewa Lipińska (mother)

Academic background
- Education: IFiS PAN
- Thesis: Nieświadomość a świadomość intencjonalna. Wokół myśli Z. Freuda i E. Husserla (1994)
- Doctoral advisor: Józef Niżnik

Academic work
- Discipline: Philosophy
- Sub-discipline: Philosophy of culture
- Website: Andrzej Leder publications on Academia.edu

Andrzej Leder (born 1960) is a Polish philosopher of culture, practicing psychotherapist, and internationally recognized expert on Polish cultural history.

== Biography ==
Andrzej Leder, the son of Witold Leder and Ewa Lipińska, graduated from the Medical University of Warsaw, and in philosophy from the University of Warsaw. He then obtained his doctorate from the Institute of Philosophy and Sociology of the Polish Academy of Sciences, supervised by Professor Józef Niżnik. He has worked at the latter institute since 1996, including from 2010 as an associate professor.

Leder engages regularly in public debates on culture and memory in Poland. He has contributed to the periodical Res Publica Nowa from 1992 to 2012, and more recently to the weekly magazine Ozon.

In 2015, his book The Sleepwalkers’ Revolution was nominated for the Polish Nike Award, and also for the Kazimierz Moczarski History Award.

== Selected works ==
- Przemiana mitów, czyli życie w epoce schyłku. Zbiór esejów (Warsaw: OPEN Publishing, 1997), translated as The Changing Guise of Myths: Philosophical Essays (Peter Lang GmbH, 2013)
- Nieświadomość jako pustka ("The Unconscious as Emptiness"; Warsaw: Institute of Philosophy and Sociology of the Polish Academy of Sciences, 2001)
- Nauka Freuda w epoce Sein und Zeit ("The Teachings of Freud during the Sein und Zeit Period"; Warsaw: Aletheia Publishing, 2007)
- Prześniona rewolucja. Ćwiczenia z logiki historycznej ("The Sleepwalkers’ Revolution: Exercises in Historical Logic"; Warsaw: Krytyka Polityczna, 2014)
- Rysa na tafli ("Scratch on the Glass"; Warsaw: Polish Scientific Publishers PWN, 2016)
- Był kiedyś postmodernizm... Sześć esejów o schyłku XX stulecia ("Once Upon A Time, Postmodernism... Six Essays on the Late 20th Century"; Warsaw: Institute of Philosophy and Sociology of the Polish Academy of Sciences, 2018)
