= Walecki =

Walecki or Wałecki may refer to:

- Henryk Walecki, Polish inter-war communist activist
- Wałcz County (powiat wałecki), an administrative division in NW Poland
