= Joanna Olczak-Ronikier =

Polish writer and scenarist

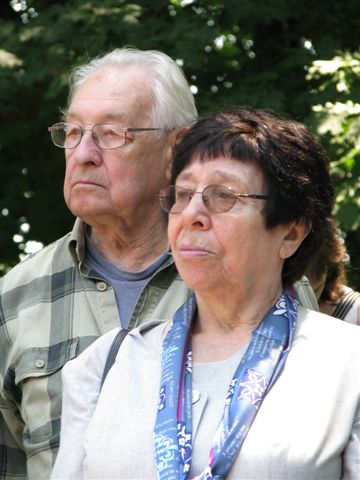
- Joanna Olczak-Ronikier with Andrzej Wajda in 2008
- Born: Joanna Olczak; 12 November 1934 (age 91); Warsaw, Poland
- Occupation: novelist
- Writing career
- Notable works: W ogrodzie pamięci Korczak. Próba biografii

Joanna Olczak-Ronikier (born 12 November 1934) is a Polish writer and scenarist, co-founder of the Piwnica pod Baranami cabaret in Kraków.

== Biography ==
Joanna Olczak was born on 12 November 1934 in Warsaw to a Polish-Jewish family, a daughter of Tadeusz Olczak and writer Hanna Mortkowicz. Her maternal grandmother was writer Janina de domo Horwitz; and her maternal grandfather was book publisher Jakób Mortkowicz. Joanna Olczak-Ronikier is also related with Maksymilian Horwitz and Kamilla Kancewicz.

In 1994 she wrote a monograph about Piwnica pod Baranami and four years later a biography of Piotr Skrzynecki. Olczak-Ronikier also authored dramas, including Ja-Napoleon (Teatr Dramatyczny, Warsaw; 1968) and Z biegiem lat, z biegiem dni... (Teatr Stary, Cracow; 1978).

In 2002 her memoir about her family's history W ogrodzie pamięci won the Nike Award and Kraków Book of the Month Award. In 2011 she received the Klio Award and was nominated to Nike Award for Janusz Korczak biography, Korczak. Próba biografii.

She was married twice: to a German journalist Ludwig Zimmerer (1924–1987), they had one daughter, Katarzyna Zimmerer (born in 1961); and to a Polish translator Michał Ronikier (born in 1939).
