= Witold Leder =

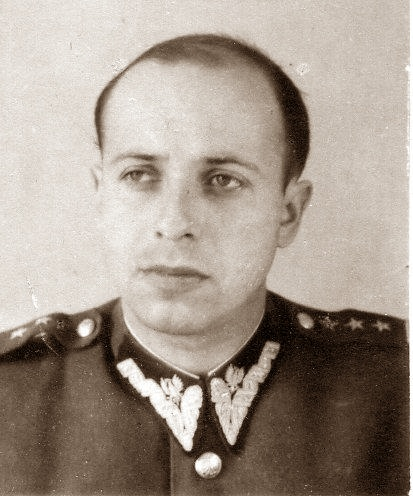
- Born: December 8, 1913; Paris
- Died: April 16, 2007 (aged 93); Warsaw

Witold Leder (December 8, 1913 - April 16, 2007) was a Polish military intelligence officer, activist, translator, and author. He shared in the ups and downs of the anti-Stalinist current of Polish communism, in which he was a lifelong participant.

== Youth (1913-1933) ==
He was born in Paris as the son of Władysław Feinstein, known among various pseudonyms as Zdzisław Leder (1880–1938), and Lili Hirszfeld (1885–1962), two Polish émigrés and activists of the Marxist SDKPiL Party, after 1918 Communist Party of Poland. As a child, he moved wherever Feinstein/Leder's Communist assignments would take the family, from 1920 on behalf of the Soviet Union: he thus lived in Paris (1913–15), Geneva (1915–18), Warsaw (1919–20), Moscow (1920–21), Sopot (1921), Berlin (1921–24), Moscow again (1924–26), Naples (1926-28), and Rome (1928). While the rest of the family moved back to Moscow in 1928, he attended high school in Lahr where he joined the Young Communist League of Germany (under a false name, since he could not do so legally as a Soviet citizen) and received German Abitur in 1931. He then joined his father who was on a diplomatic mission in London on behalf of the Soviet Union, and worked there at the TASS bureau for half a year, then moved together with his father to Paris, and undertook studies there in electrical engineering.

== Military career (1933-38, 1943-52) ==
In 1933, back in Moscow, he joined the Zhukovsky Air Force Engineering Academy, through which he would become a commanding officer of the Red Army. However, following his father's arrest (September 1937) and death in captivity (February 1938) as part of the Great Purge, he was removed from the Academy and Red Army in mid-1938.

For several years he worked odd jobs, including as a translator and teacher of English. In October 1941, as Axis forces were approaching Moscow, he moved together with his mother and brother to Orenburg (then named Chkalov after Valery Chkalov), where they experienced hardship together with thousands of other refugees.

In the spring of 1943, he was informed by Zygmunt Modzelewski, who was a friend of the family and had remained in Moscow, about the effort to organize a Polish Division as part of the Soviet war effort. He volunteered and in autumn 1943 became a captain in the 1st Tadeusz Kościuszko Infantry Division, then served in the 1st Corps of the Polish Armed Forces (pl) and the 1st ("Warsaw") and 2nd Air Force Regiments (pl) of the Polish People's Army, participating in military operations all the way to Berlin in the spring of 1945. Simultaneously, and together with his brother Stefan, in 1943 he also joined the newly organized Polish Workers' Party, a choice he later explained as driven by his deep belief in the righteousness of Communism despite his first-hand experience of the Soviet regime's atrocities under Stalin.

After the war's end, back in Warsaw under the Provisional Government and then the Polish People's Republic, Leder served in the Second (Intelligence) Department (pl) of Polish General Staff under Wacław Komar, a veteran of the Spanish Civil War and former head of intelligence of the XIII International Brigade. From March 1946 he was deputy head of the Second Department for operational matters, with rank of colonel. His military intelligence group, however, fell under increased pressure from Poland's Stalinist leadership, and in early 1951 he was demoted. Meanwhile, General Komar was made Quartermaster general, ostensibly a promotion but which in reality deprived him of influence.

== Imprisonment and rehabilitation (1952-54) ==
In March 1952, in the late days of Stalinism, he was arrested while vacationing with his wife in Zakopane, as part of a broader wave of political persecution. Komar was arrested in November 1952; so was Stanisław Flato in February 1953, who together with Leder had been one of Komar's two deputies in the Second Department; Stanisław Bielski committed suicide in February 1953. Leder was incarcerated in Warsaw, tortured, and held in solitary confinement. He was released and rehabilitated on December 6, 1954.

== Later life and writing (1954-2007) ==
Witold Leder then worked as deputy director of the Institute of Aviation. He became the institute's Party Secretary in 1956 at the time of the Polish October, in which he was an active participant. In 1958 he became head of the international department of Nowe Drogi, a monthly publication of the Central Committee of the Polish United Workers' Party.

In the ensuing years, he became increasingly active as a translator and conference interpreter in matters of socio-political, historical and economic analysis, and remained involved in those areas well into his retirement. He spoke fluent English, French, German, and Russian. Among numerous published translations, he translated several key works of Polish Marxist philosopher Adam Schaff into German. In 1981 he was a co-founder of the Association of Polish Translators and Interpreters (Stowarzyszenie Tłumaczy Polskich). He also wrote essays and articles of his own on international politics, mostly in Polish and German. Late in his life, together with his brother Stefan Leder who in the meantime had become a noted psychiatrist, he coauthored a book on their family members' history and lifelong commitment to Communism, first published in German as Unbeirrbar Rot: Zeugen und Zeugnisse einer Familie (2002, ISBN 3929390620) and then in Polish as Czerwona nić: Ze wspomnień i prac rodziny Lederów (2005, ISBN 8320717892).

As he put it in one of that book's essays, he never gave up on the possibility of a revived Communist ideal. In 1980-81 he was involved in what became known as the "horizontal movement", an attempt at reforming the Polish United Workers' Party from within, whose name hinted at alternative structures to democratic centralism. This is also why he did not join Solidarity despite being personally close to many of its founders and key activists. He reckoned that he "did not completely fit in the [Communist] system into which life, not without my own participation, had thrown me".

He died in 2007 and was buried at the Powązki Military Cemetery in Warsaw (section A2-8-6), together with his aunt Edda Tennenbaum (1880-1952), also a communist activist, and later joined by his wife Ewa Lipińska (1919-2012), a microbiologist. His son Andrzej Leder (born 1960) is a Polish philosopher.

== Honors ==
He was awarded the Order of Polonia Restituta in 1946.

== See also ==
- Trial of the Generals
