= Edward Próchniak =

Polish communist activist and one of the founders of the Communist Party of Poland

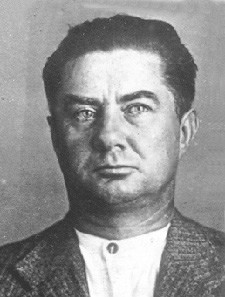
Portrait of Próchniak after his arrest by the NKVD in 1937

Edward Próchniak (Polish pronunciation: [ˈɛdvart ˈpruxɲak]; 4 December 1888 in Puławy – 21 August 1937) was a leading Polish communist activist and one of the founders of the Communist Party of Poland.

He joined the Social Democracy of the Kingdom of Poland and Lithuania in 1903. After the Russian Revolution he headed a department in the Polish Commissariat of the People's Commissariat for Nationalities in Russia and was a member of the Polish Section of the Bolshevik Party. From 1921 to 1924 he represented the Communist Party of Poland (KPP) Central Committee on the executive of the Communist International, and was a member of the Comintern executive 1922–37, and of its Presidium in 1925–30.

As a member of the politburo of the KPP in 1936–37, Próchniak was summoned from Paris to Moscow in July 1937 and arrested on 8 July 1937 by the NKVD. He was imprisoned initially in the Lubyanka prison, and then interrogated in Butyrek, where he had been a prisoner in Czarist times. Despite severe torture, he allegedly denied accusations of being an agent of the Polish Military Organization (POW). Próchniak was sentenced to death on 21 August 1937 and shot the same day.

He was posthumously rehabilitated on 7 May 1955.
