= Jakub Mortkowicz =

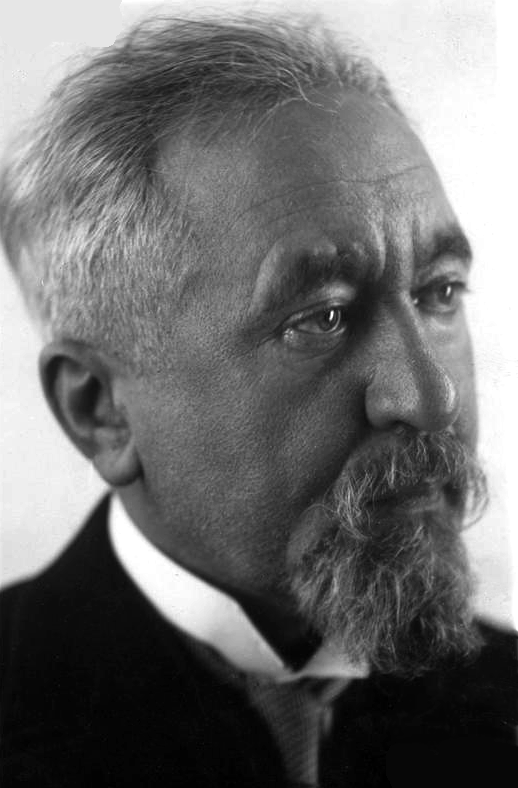
- Mortkowicz in 1931
- Born: 25 March 1876; Opoczno, Congress Poland
- Died: 9 August 1931 (aged 55)
- Occupations: Bookseller, book publisher
- Spouse: Janina Mortkowicz

Jakub Mortkowicz (25 March 1876 − 9 August 1931) was a Polish book publisher and bookseller.

== Biography ==
He was born to a Polish Jewish family in Opoczono, as a son of Eliasz. Young Jakub graduated from junior high school in Radom. Then, he was studying in Munich, Brussels and Antwerp, where he graduated from Trading Academy and was a member of the Association of the Polish Students (Stowarzyszenie Polskich Studentów) and the Federation of the Socialist Youth (Związek Młodzieży Socjalistycznej). After returning to Poland, he was working for Hyppolite Wawelberg and joined the Polish Socialist Party. For socialist activity, Jakub Mortkowicz was prisoned in the Warsaw Citadel and then he was punished by forced migration to the Caucasus Mountains.

In 1903, when he returned to Warsaw, Mortkowicz and Teodor Toeplitz founded the Mortkowicz Towarzystwo Wydawnicze w Warszawie Sp. Akc., one of the most important book's companies in prewar Poland. In 1931 he committed suicide. Jakub Mortkowicz was buried at the Jewish Cemetery in Warsaw.

He was married to a translator Janina Mortkowicz. Their daughter Hanna Mortkowicz-Olczakowa was a writer, as her daughter Joanna Olczak-Ronikier.
