= Lucjan Szenwald =

Polish poet (1909–1944)

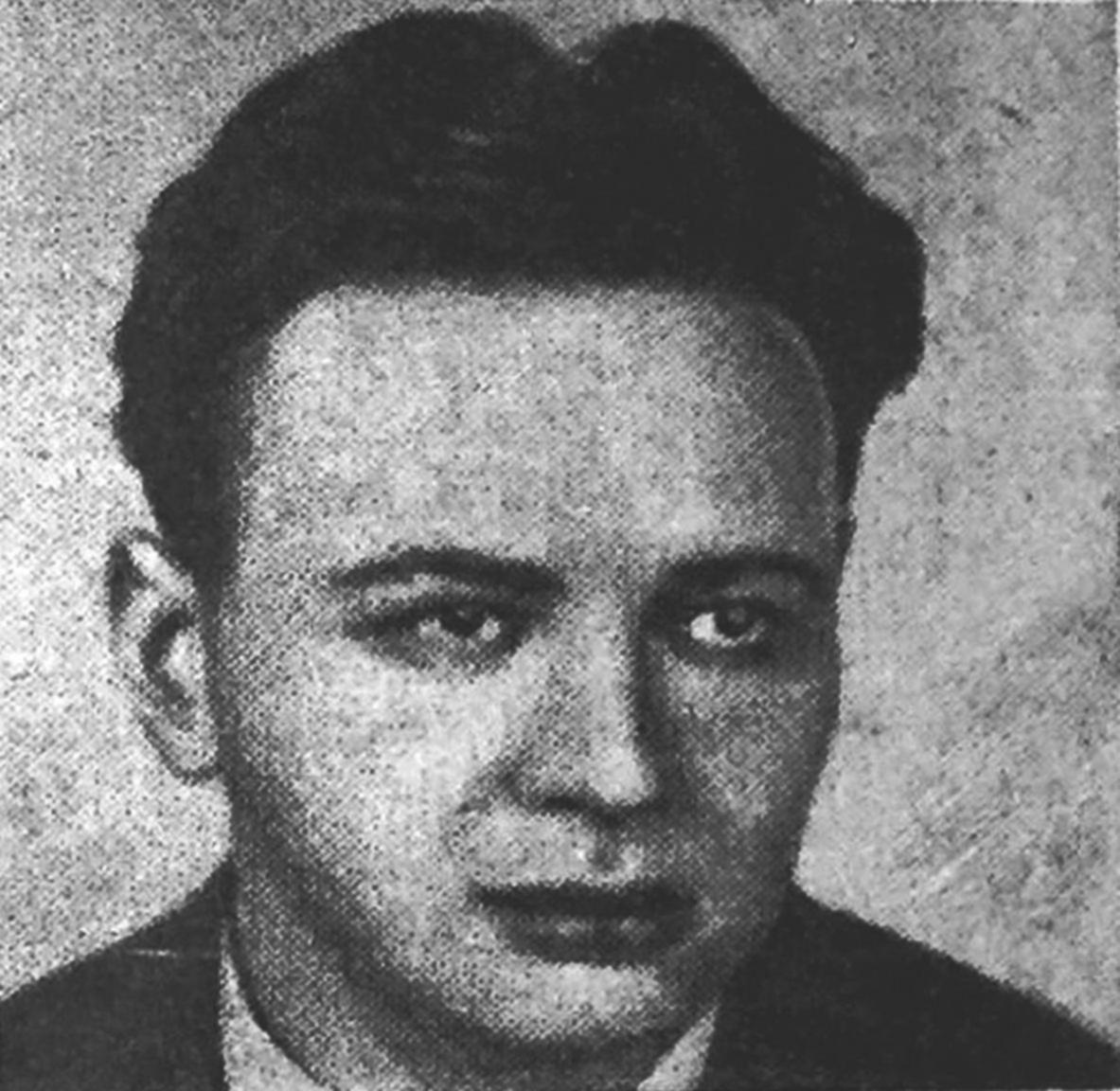
- Born: 13 March 1909; Warsaw, Congress Poland, Russian Empire
- Died: 22 August 1944 (aged 35); Kurów, Occupied Poland
- Resting place: Powązki Military Cemetery

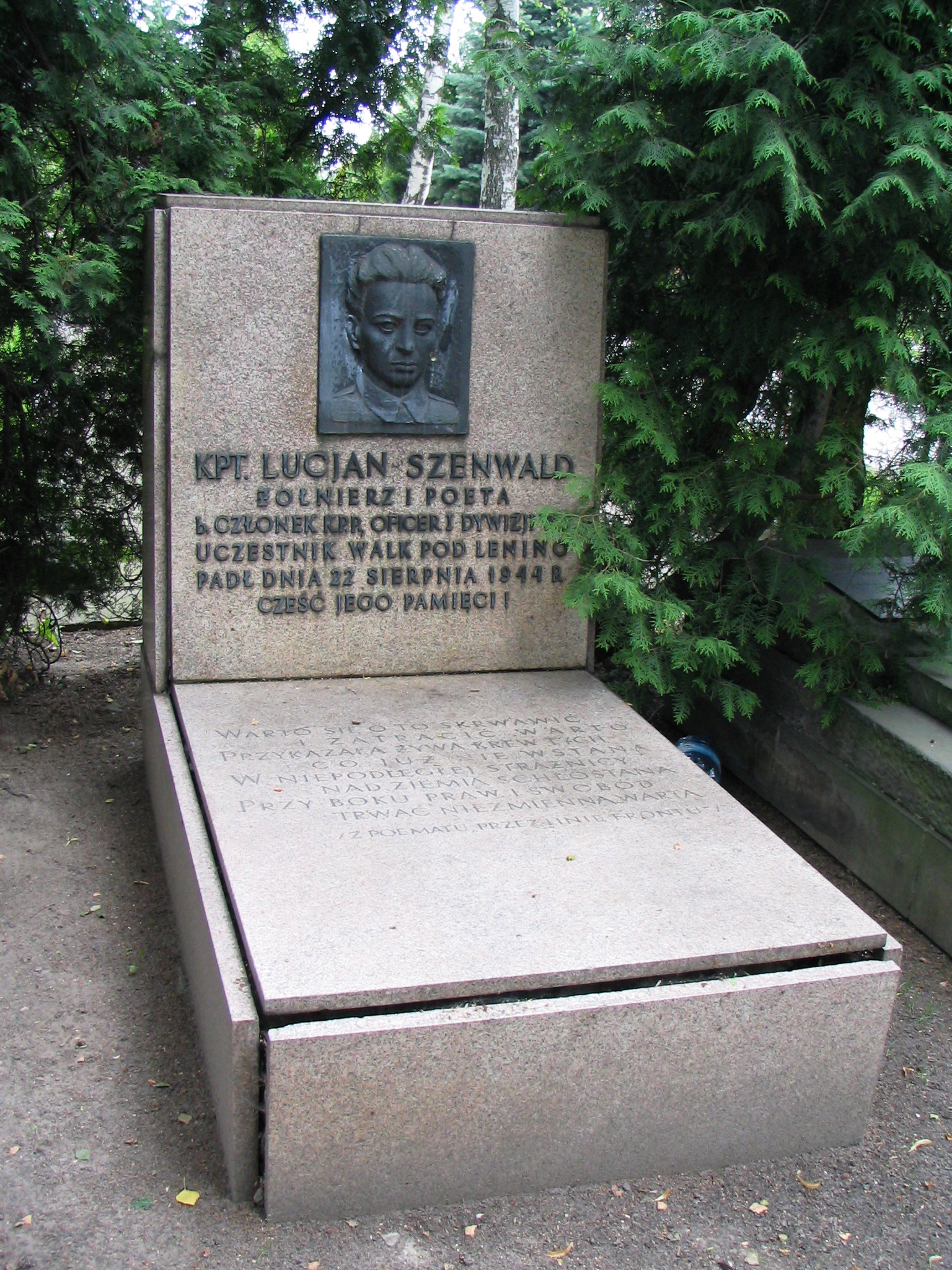
Grave of Szenwald at the Military Powązki Cemetery in Warsaw

Lucjan Szenwald (Polish pronunciation: [ˈlut͡sjan ˈʂɛnvalt]; 13 March 1909 – 22 August 1944) was a Polish poet and communist activist.

He first made his appearance as a member of the Skamander group with the poem "Przybierający księżyc" (A Primping Moon). However he was generally associated with a different literary group - the "Kwadryga" - which differentiated itself from the Skamanders by emphasizing the role of social problems in aesthetics. He was an editor of the weekly "Na przełaj" (Through the fields) which was a subsidiary of the main organ of the Communist Party of Poland newspaper Lewar. In 1930 he was an active member of the youth organization of the Polish Communists and by 1932 of the party itself. Between 1938 and 1939 he was arrested three times for communist activity (at the time, both the far right and the far left political parties were banned in Poland).

After the break out of World War II he wound up in Kovel and later in Lwow. In both places he enthusiastically collaborated with the Soviet occupiers. In Lwow he worked in the Lwow Soviet Radio where he was in charge of translating Bolshevik poets, particularly Mayakovsky into Polish.

In 1941 he joined the Red Army. For unknown reasons by 1943 he wound up in Siberia in workers' battalion. He took active part in helping to form the Soviet affiliated Polish 1st Tadeusz Kościuszko Infantry Division. He eventually became the official diarist of the division. He participated in the Battle of Lenino.

He died in a car accident, although a different version blames Soviet soldiers for his death - he was shot after he refused to exit the car he was sitting in. He was buried at the Powązki Cemetery. Multiple schools and streets were named after him during the communist era in Poland.

His poems were both Classicist and romantic in style. He also translated major works of English and Russian literature. He was the author of the lyrics to the popular satyrical song "Long Live War!", popularized by Stanisław Grzesiuk.
