= Adam Schaff =

Polish philosopher (1913–2006)

- Born: 10 March 1913; Lemberg, Austro-Hungarian Empire (now Lviv, Ukraine)
- Died: 12 November 2006 (aged 93); Warsaw, Poland
- Awards: Order of Polonia Restituta

Education
- Education: Lviv University; Moscow State University

Philosophical work
- Era: 20th-century philosophy
- Region: Western philosophy
- School: Marxism
- Doctoral students: Henryk Holland, Leszek Kołakowski
- Main interests: Epistemology

Adam Schaff (10 March 1913 – 12 November 2006) was a Polish Marxist philosopher.

== Life ==
Of Jewish origin, Schaff was born in Lemberg (Lwów, Lviv) into a lawyer's family. Schaff studied economics at the Ecole des Sciences Politiques et Economiques in Paris, and philosophy in Poland, specializing in epistemology. In 1945 he received a philosophy degree at Moscow University, and in 1948 he returned to Warsaw University. He was considered the official ideologue of the Polish United Workers' Party, especially during its Stalinist period.

He was a member of the Polish Academy of Sciences and of the Club of Rome.

== Works ==
- Word and Concept
- Language and Cognition
- Introduction to Semantics
- Problems of the Marxist Theory of Truth
- A Philosophy of Man

Several of Schaff's works were translated into German by Witold Leder.

== See also ==
- History of philosophy in Poland
- Marxism
