= Polish Socialist Party – Left =

Polish Socialist Party – Left Polska Partia Socjalistyczna – Lewica
- Abbreviation: PPS–L
- Founded: 1906
- Dissolved: 1918
- Split from: PPS
- Merged into: Communist Party of Poland
- Ideology: Marxism; Revolutionary socialism Proletarian internationalism
- Political position: Far-left
- Colours: Red

The Polish Socialist Party – Left (Polish: Polska Partia Socjalistyczna – Lewica, PPS–L), also known as the Young Faction (Polish: Młodzi), was one of two factions formed when the Polish Socialist Party split at its ninth congress in 1906.

The faction's primary objective was to transform Poland into a Marxist state through proletarian revolution, with the likely aim of integrating into a Soviet-aligned international communist bloc (a position widely opposed by the Revolutionary Faction and viewed by many as a betrayal of Polish independence).

Its main opposition within the PPS was the Revolutionary Faction (also known as the Old Faction – Starzy), which sought to restore an independent Poland envisioned as a representative democracy.

PPS–L for a time gathered most of the former PPS members, but with the failure of the Russian Revolution of 1905 and corresponding revolution in the Kingdom of Poland (1905–1907), it had lost popularity. In 1909 PPS–FR renamed itself back to Polska Partia Socjalistyczna (Polish Socialist Party). Over time the party became more Marxist. The increasingly marginal PPS–L – opposing the First World War and supporting the Russian Revolution of 1917 – eventually merged with Social Democracy of the Kingdom of Poland and Lithuania on 16 December 1918 to form the Communist Party of Poland.

One member of Lewica was elected to the Central Executive Committee of Ukraine at the Second All-Ukrainian Congress of Soviets in Katerynoslav (Dnipropetrovsk) on 19 March 1918.

Prominent activists of the PPS–L were: Maria Koszutska, Feliks Kon, Stefan Królikowski, Paweł Lewinson, Henryk Walecki and Tadeusz Rechniewski.

PPS–L was recreated in 1926 by PPS activists who opposed PPS involvement with Józef Piłsudski (particularly in the aftermath of his May Coup). It was delegalized in 1931.

== See also ==
- Polish Socialist Party
- Polish nationalism
- Western Rifle Division
