= Sztandar Socjalizmu =

Former newspaper in Poland

Sztandar Socjalizmu (transl. The Banner of Socialism) was a Polish newspaper, founded in December 1918 as the main press organ of the Communist Workers Party of Poland. The first editorial board of the paper was elected at the founding congress of the party in 1918.
