= Cultural history of Poland =

The term cultural history refers both to an academic discipline and to its subject matter. Cultural history of Poland often combines the approaches of anthropology and history to look at cultural traditions of Poland as well as interpretations of historical experience. It examines the records and narrative descriptions of past knowledge, customs, and arts of the Polish nation. Its subject matter encompasses the continuum of events leading from the Middle Ages to the present.

The cultural history of Poland is closely associated with the field of Polish studies, interpreting the historical records with regard not only to its painting, sculpture and architecture, but also, the economic basis underpinning the Polish society by denoting the various distinctive ways of cohabitation by an entire group of people. Cultural history of Poland involves the aggregate of past cultural activity, such as ritual, ideas, sciences, social movements and the interaction of cultural themes with the sense of identity.

The cultural history of Poland can be divided into the following periods:

- Middle Ages
- Renaissance
- Baroque
- Enlightenment
- Romanticism
- Positivism
- Young Poland
- Interbellum
- World War II
- People's Republic of Poland
- Modern

== See also ==
- Culture of Poland
- History of Poland
