= Hanna Mortkowicz-Olczakowa =

- Born: Hanna Mortkowicz; 15 October 1905; Warsaw, Poland
- Died: 5 January 1968 (aged 62)
- Citizenship: Poland
- Occupations: novelist, poet
- Writing career
- Period: 1920-1968

Hanna Mortkowicz-Olczakowa (15 October 1905 – 5 January 1968) was a Polish poet and writer. She was the writer of several novels for children and young adults.

== Biography ==
She was born on 15 October 1905 in Warsaw to a Jewish family, as a daughter of Jakób Mortkowicz (1876–1931), a book publisher and Janina Horwitz (1875–1960), a writer. Her parents were running a bookshop.

Hanna Mortkowicz-Olczakowa graduated in Polish studies and art history from the University of Warsaw, also she studied painting at the Academy of Fine Arts in Warsaw. As a poet she debuted in 1920.

Mortkowicz-Olczakowa received Gold Cross of Merit (1955), Knight's Cross Order of Polonia Restituta (1959) and Officer's Cross Order of Polonia Restituta (1966).

She was married with Tadeusz Olczak. Their daughter, Joanna Olczak-Ronikier is also a writer.

== Books ==
- 1978: Janusz Korczak
- 1961: Bunt wspomnień
- 1965: O Stefanie Żeromskim: ze wspomnień i dokumentów
- 1965: Spadek i inne opowiadania
- 1956: Piotr Michałowski. Opowieść o życiu i twórczości
- 1930: Niepotrzebne serce
- 1927: Podanie o Wandzie: dzieje wątku literackiego
