= Maksymilian Horwitz =

Polish communist leader and theoretician

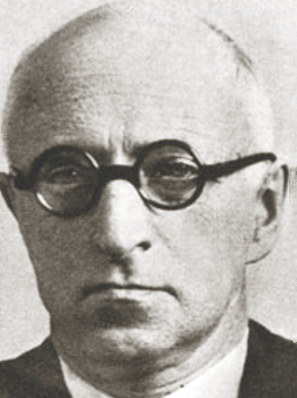
- Born: 6 September 1877; Warsaw, Congress Poland, Russian Empire
- Died: 20 September 1937 (aged 60); Moscow, USSR
- Other name: Henryk Walecki
- Education: PhD, University of Ghent (1898)
- Political party: Polish Socialist Party – Left (1906–1918); Communist Party of Poland (1918–1937)

Maksymilian Horwitz (pseudonym: Henryk Walecki; 6 September 1877 – 20 September 1937) was a leader and theoretician of the Polish socialist and communist movement.

== Biography ==
Maksymilian Horwitz was born to a Jewish family in Warsaw, the son of Gustaw Horwitz and Julia Kleinmann.

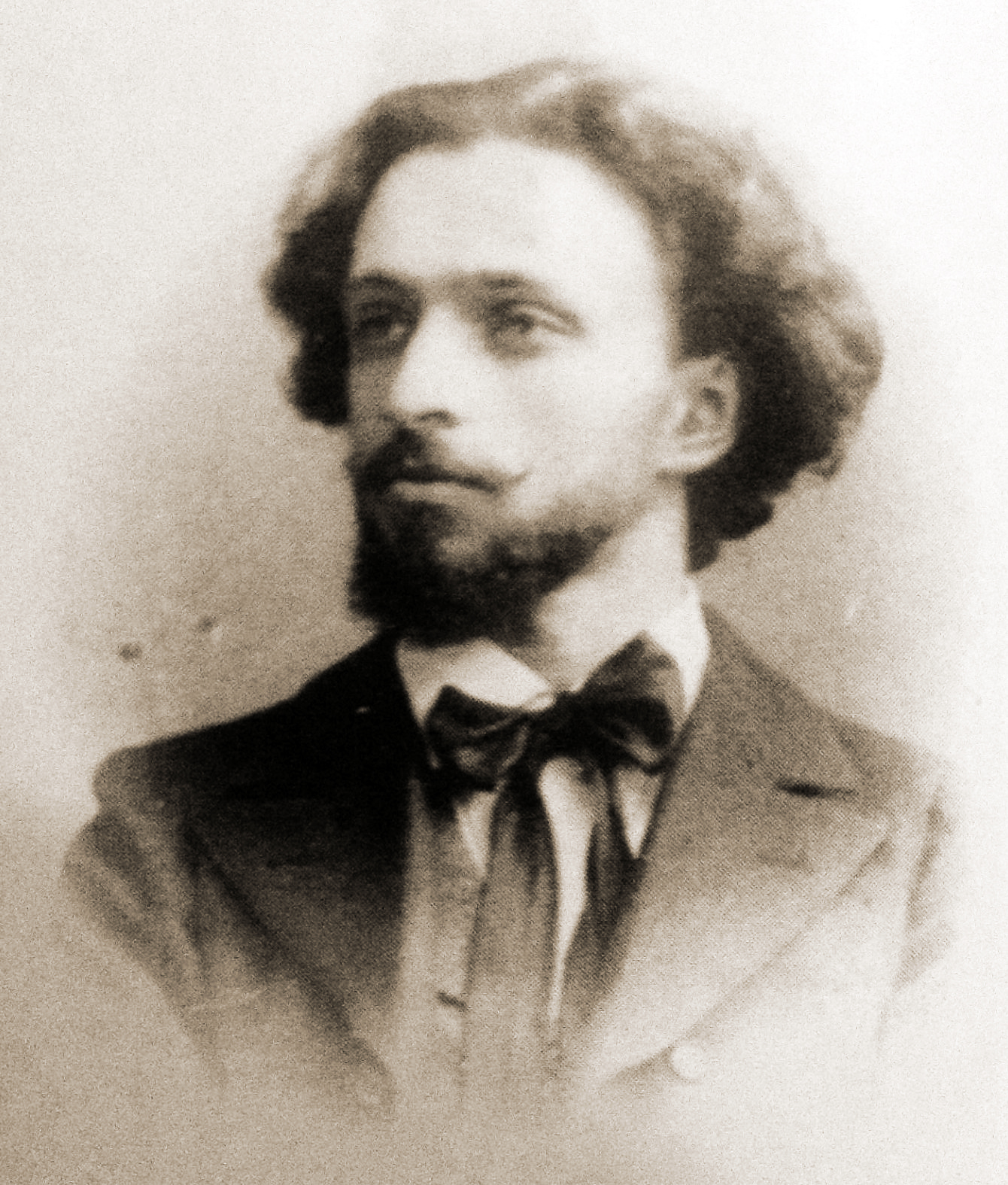
Horwitz in 1898

After leaving school, he studied mathematics at Ghent University, graduating in 1898, and joined the Belgian Socialist movement, and a group of emigre Polish socialists, in 1895. He returned to Warsaw in 1898, and joined the Polish Socialist Party (PPS). Arrested in December 1899, he was exiled to Siberia in 1901, but escaped in 1902 and emigrated to Switzerland, returning to Warsaw during the 1905 Revolution, and was again arrested and exiled. He escaped from Siberia again in 1907. In exile in Kraków – then under Austrian rule – and Vienna, then he became one of the leaders of the Polish Socialist Party – Left (PPS-Lewica), who opposed the Polish nationalism of Józef Piłsudski, and during World War I drew closer to the SDPKiL, led by Rosa Luxemburg. Horwitz edited the faction's newspaper Myśl Socjalistyczna. It was during this period that he adopted the alias, Henryk Walecki, by which he became better known.

After the outbreak of war, in 1914, Walecki emigrated from Austria to Switzerland, where he came into contact with Lenin and Zinoviev, and represented the PPS-Lewica at the organising conference that the preceded the Zimmerwald Conference of left wing anti-war delegates from across Europe. From May 1915, he edited the newspaper Volksrecht in Zurich, which supported the Bolsheviks after they had seized power in Russia.

In 1918, Walecki was expelled from Switzerland for his role in a railway workers' strike, and returned to Warsaw, where he was one of the founders of the Communist Party of Poland (KPP), formed in 1918 by a merger of the PPS-Lewica and the SDPKiL, and a member of its Central Committee in 1918–20 and 1923–24, and politburo in 1923–24. Arrested in the winter of 1919, he was released on bail after several months, and fled to Russia, where he formed part of the triumvirate known as the 'three Ws', who led the Polish Communist Party in exile. The others were Adolf Warski and Maria Koszutska, alias Wera Kostrzewa. From February 1921, Walecki was a Polish delegate on the executive committees of Comintern and Profintern, and was frequently sent abroad as a Comintern agent to guide the political direction of communist or socialist parties. including those of Italy, in October 1921, France, in December 1921, and the US, in August 1922.

In November 1923, after disturbances in Poland following a general strike called by the KPP were quickly put down, the 'three Ws' came under attack from left wing opponents with in the KPP, led by Julian Lenski, who accused them of passivity. Also, late in 1923, as Lenin's terminal illness set off a power struggle in Moscow, the KPP issued a statement defending Trotsky. Their record was examined during a three-day session of at the Fifth Congress of Comintern in June 1924, chaired by Stalin, at which Walecki defiantly defended the record of three Ws. In January 1925, Walecki was removed from the leadership of the KPP, after which he was never involved in the affairs of the Polish party again.

Alexander Barmine, who was based in Riga in 1922, returned to Moscow on the same train as delegates to the Fourth Congress of Comintern, including Walecki and Eugen Varga, and complained in his memoirs that they "showed the most revolting lack of consideration" by demanding that they be allocated a private compartment on a crowded train, and lodging a complaint in Moscow when he turned them down. Barmine commented: "Surely an old revolutionary like Walecki ought to have been content with a berth in a first-class sleeper. The little luxuries of power go to men's heads."

Walecki continued to work for Comintern, where he was deputy head of the Balkan Secretariat in 1925–28, and editor of the journal Communist International from 1935. During the Great Purge, he was arrested by the NKVD on 21 June 1937 and executed on 20 September 1937. Horwitz was rehabilitated after the 20th Congress of the Communist Party of the Soviet Union.

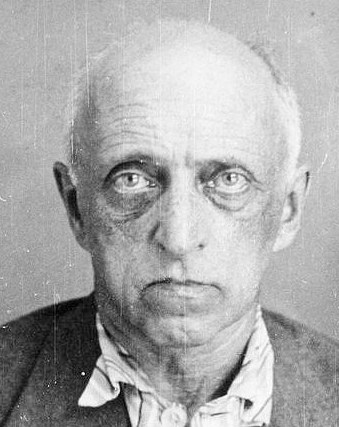
Portrait of Walecki after his arrest by the NKVD in June 1937

Hortwitz's niece, Hanna Mortkowicz-Olczakowa and her daughter, Joanna Olczak-Ronikier are writers.
