= Maria Koszutska =

Polish communist leader and theoretician

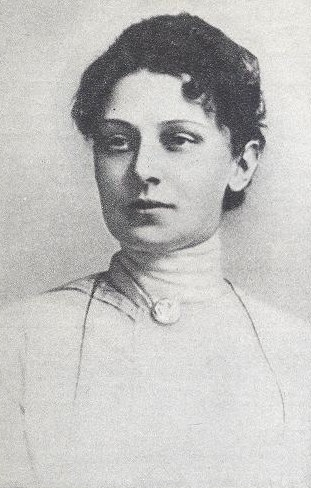
- Maria Koszutska
- Born: Maria Karolina Sabina Koszutska; February 2, 1876; Główczyn, German Empire
- Died: July 9, 1939 (aged 63); Moscow, Soviet Union
- Other name: Wera Kostrzewa
- Political party: Communist Party of Poland (1918–1938)
- Other political affiliations: Polish Socialist Party (1902–1918)

Maria Karolina Sabina Koszutska (pseudonym Wera Kostrzewa) (2 February 1876 – 9 July 1939) was a leader and theoretician of the Polish Socialist Party "Left" faction (Polska Partia Socjalistyczna, PPS — Lewica) and later of the Communist Party of Poland (KPP).

She joined the PPS in 1902 and was a member of the executive of the splinter PPS-Left, and was one of the founding members of the Polish Communist Party (KPP) from 1918, and was one of the triumvirate known as the 'three Ws' who ran the party for its first six years. The other triumvirs were Adolf Warski and Henrikh Walecki. With interruptions, she sat on the Central Committee of the KPP 1918–29 and its Politburo 1923–29. In the KPP, Koszutska led the more moderate "majority" faction. In December 1925, she co-signed a declaration that "the name of comrade Trotsky is for our party, for the whole International, for the whole revolutionary world proletariat, indissolubly bound up with the victorious October Revolution", which made her and her fellow triumvirs vulnerable to attack from the left wing of the KPP, led by Julian Lenski as Trotsky lost the power struggle in the Kremlin in the mid-1920s.

After 1929 she lived in the Soviet Union, working in a publishing house, and prevented from taking part in the affairs of the KPP. She opposed the Stalinization of the KPP and the Communist International. In June 1937, during the Great Purge, the head of the NKVD, Nikolai Yezhov claimed to have uncovered a 'Polish Military Organisation' made up of agents of the Polish government posing as political refugees in the USSR. Koszutska was arrested as one of its supposed leaders. She was the only woman among those accused, and the only one not executed. Koszutska died in prison in 1939. She was rehabilitated in 1956.
