= Jerzy Czeszejko-Sochacki =

Polish politician and publicist

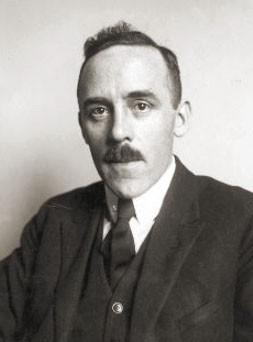
Jerzy Czeszejko-Sochacki

Jerzy Czeszejko-Sochacki (Polish pronunciation: [ˈjɛʐɨ t͡ʂɛˈʂɛjkɔ sɔˈxat͡skʲi]; 29 November 1892, in Nizhyn – 4 September 1933, in Moscow) was a Polish socialist, later communist politician, publicist and an early victim of Stalinist repression.

He joined the Polish Socialist Party in 1914, and the Communist Party of Poland (KPP) in 1921. From 1921 to 1933 he was a member and alternate member of the KPP Central Committee, and from 1929 to 1933 sat on its politburo. A member of the Polish Parliament (Sejm). KPP representative to the Communist International executive from 1930 and a deputy member of its Presidium from 1931. He was arrested in Moscow on 15 August 1933. He committed suicide on 4 September 1933, according to one version by jumping from a bridge over the prison courtyard, and according to another by jumping from the window of the room where he was being interrogated and tortured. He left a note, written in his own blood, proclaiming his innocence and undying loyalty to the communist party.

== Sources. Recommended literature. External links ==
- William J. Chase, Enemies within the Gates? The Comintern and the Stalinist Repression, 1934-1939 Yale University Press] 2001, ISBN 0-300-08242-8; Chapter 5. The Victims of Vigilance in the web - Yale Annals of Communism Project
- Marian Kamil Dziewanowski, The Communist Party of Poland. An outline of history. Second edition. Harvard University Press, Cambridge, Mass., and London, England, 1976,
- Gabriele Simoncini, The Communist Party of Poland: 1918-1929. A Study in Political Ideology. Mellen Press. Lewiston, New York; Queenston, Canada; Lampeter, United Kingdom, 1993. ISBN 0-7734-9414-6
