= Communist Party of Poland =

Communist Party of Poland Komunistyczna Partia Polski
- Founded: 1918
- Dissolved: 1938
- Merger of: PPS–L; SDKPiL
- Succeeded by: PPR
- Newspaper: Sztandar Socjalizmu
- Youth wing: Young Communist League of Poland
- Ideology: Communism
- Political position: Far-left
- International affiliation: Communist International
- Colours: Red

The interwar Communist Party of Poland (Polish: Komunistyczna Partia Polski, KPP) was a communist party active in Poland during the Second Polish Republic. It resulted from a merger in December 1918 of the Social Democracy of the Kingdom of Poland and Lithuania (SDKPiL) and the Polish Socialist Party – Left (PPS – Left) into the Communist Workers' Party of Poland (Komunistyczna Partia Robotnicza Polski, KPRP). The communists were a small force in Polish politics.

The Communist Party of Poland (until 1925 the Communist Workers' Party of Poland) was an organization of the radical Left. Following the ideas of Rosa Luxemburg, the party's aim was to create a Polish Socialist Republic, to be included in the planned Pan-European Commonwealth of Socialist States. The party did not support the formation of the Second Polish Republic in 1918 and supported the Bolsheviks (led by Vladimir Lenin) in the 1920 Polish–Soviet War.

The views adhered to and promulgated by the leaders of the KPP (Maria Koszutska, Adolf Warski, Maksymilian Horwitz, and Edward Próchniak) led to the party's difficult relationship with Stalin. The Communist International (Comintern) condemned the KPP for its support of Józef Piłsudski's May Coup of 1926 (the party's "May error"). From 1933, the KPP was increasingly treated with suspicion by the Comintern. The party structures were seen as compromised due to infiltration by agents of the Polish military intelligence. Some of the party leaders, falsely accused of being such agents, were subsequently executed in the Soviet Union. In 1935 and 1936, the KPP undertook a formation of a unified worker and peasant front in Poland and was then subjected to further persecutions by the Comintern, which also arbitrarily accused the Polish communists of harboring Trotskyists elements in their ranks. The apogee of the Moscow-held prosecutions, aimed at eradicating the various "deviations" and ending usually in death sentences, took place in 1937–38, with the last executions carried out in 1940.

KPP members were persecuted and often imprisoned by the Polish Sanation regime, which turned out to likely save the lives of a number of future Polish communist leaders, including Bolesław Bierut, Władysław Gomułka, Alfred Lampe, Edward Ochab, Stefan Jędrychowski, and Aleksander Zawadzki (among former KPP members transferred during World War II from the Soviet Union to Poland for conspiratorial work were Mieczysław Moczar and Marian Spychalski). During the Great Purge, seventy members and candidate members of the party's central committee fled or were brought to the Soviet Union and were shot there, along with many other activists (almost all prominent Polish communists were murdered or sent to labor camps). The Comintern, in reality directed by Stalin, in 1938 had the party dissolved and liquidated.

== Party history ==
=== 1918–1921 ===
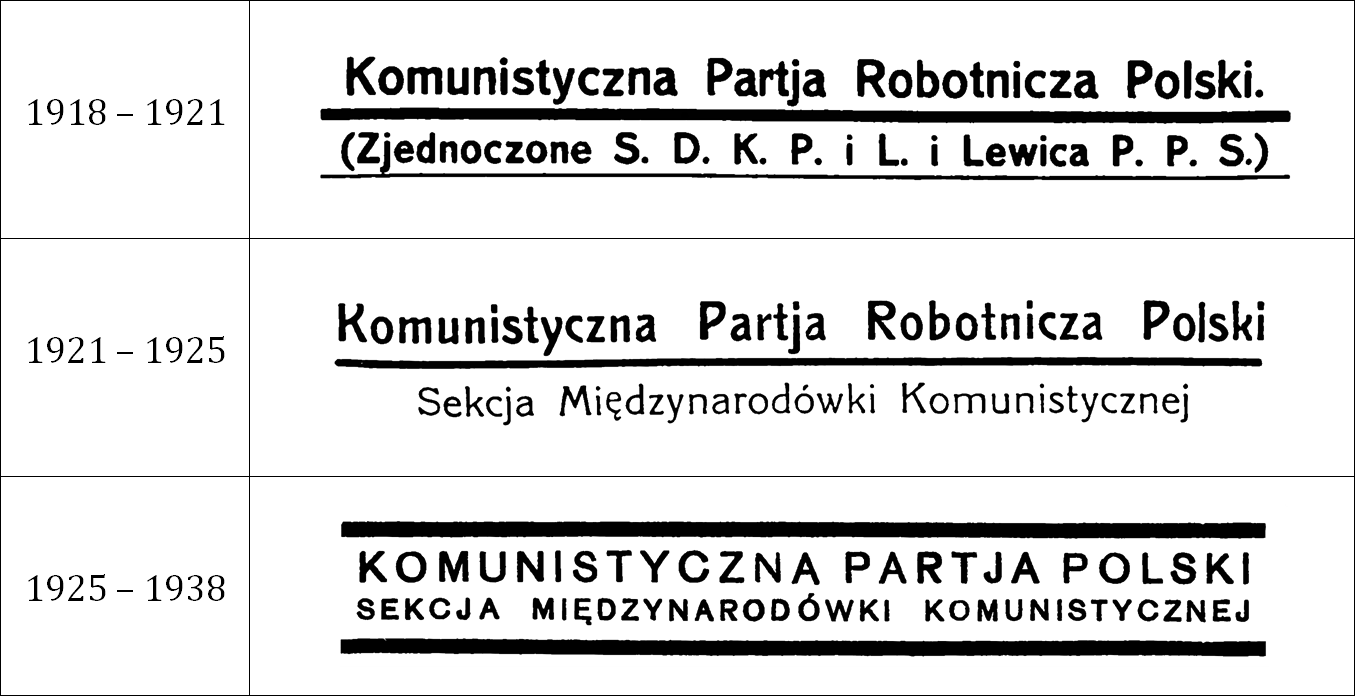
Names used by the party

==== The origins ====
The KPRP was founded on 16 December 1918. It joined the SDKPiL (one of whose leaders was Rosa Luxemburg) and the PPS – Left. It followed the program of the former. Unification of the trade union movement was a prime objective behind the merger.

The members of the new party organized Workers' Councils in Poland, which competed with the more popular Polish Socialist Party (PPS) units for working class support. The KPRP remained a small minority of the leftist movement, in part because of Luxemburg's position that Poland should remain a province of Russia rather than regain independence. In March 1919, through its representative Józef Unszlicht, the KPRP took part in the founding of the Communist International (Comintern or the Third International) in Moscow.

==== The Polish-Soviet War ====
The KPRP opposed Poland's war against Soviet Russia of 1919–21. During the fighting, the KPRP's legal status was legislatively taken away; the communist party would remain an underground organization in Poland until its demise. Due to the support for the government provided by pro-independence socialists of the PPS, efforts by the KPRP to agitate for workers' solidarity with the Red Army were forestalled. However, at the height of the Red Army offensive the Provisional Polish Revolutionary Committee was formed on 2 August 1920. It consisted of Julian Marchlewski, Felix Dzerzhinsky, Feliks Kon, Józef Unszlicht, and Edward Próchniak. Its establishment brought no political gains for the party. The traditional Marxist position on the land question as understood by the Polish Marxists was abandoned, in favour of Vladimir Lenin's views.

=== 1921–1926 ===
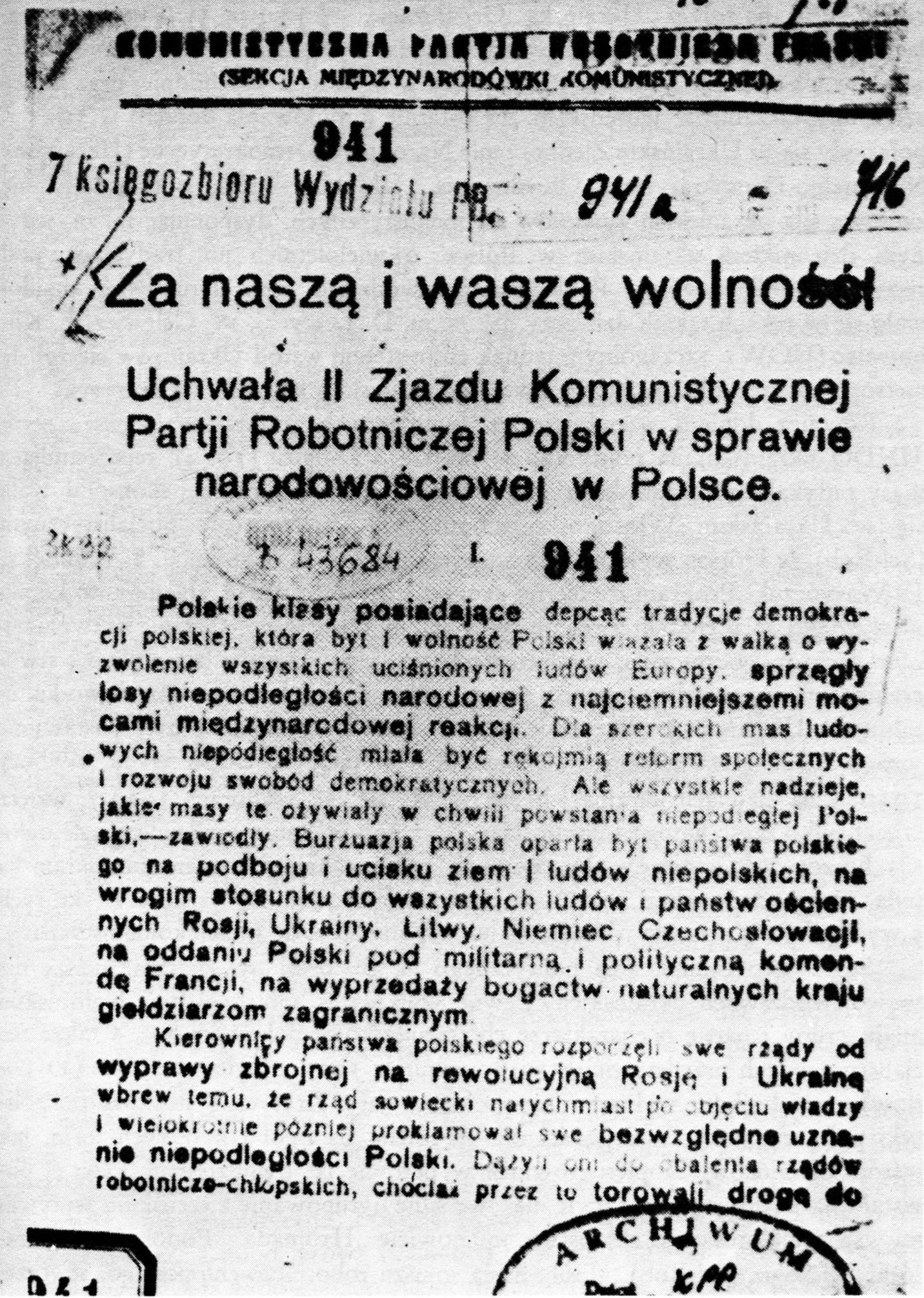
The KPRP Second Congress resolution regarding the nationality issue in Poland (1923)

The period of 1921–1926 saw relative political freedom in Poland and the KPRP took advantage of the opportunities. Gains in membership were initially made from the ranks of the reformist workers' organisations and in the late 1920s from a left-wing faction of the PPS, led by Stanislaw Lancucki and Jerzy Czeszejko-Sochacki. They joined the KPRP, giving the party representation in the Sejm (Polish legislature). Gains were also made from the General Jewish Labour Bund in Poland when a faction led by Aleksander Minc joined and from two smaller Jewish socialist groups: Poale Zion and the United Jewish Socialist Workers Party (Fareynikte). In the eastern borderlands, the KPRP and then KPP operated as the autonomous Communist Party of Western Ukraine (KPZU) and Communist Party of Western Belorussia (KPZB); substantial growth in membership was experienced there at this time. In the area of operation of KPP proper (western and central Poland numerically dominated by ethnic Poles), 22–26% of the members were Jewish, according to the party sources.

In 1922, the leadership consolidated around Adolf Warski, Maksymilian Horwitz, and Maria Koszutska of the "majority" faction, more moderate and dominant in the party until at least 1924. The "minority" faction was later led by Julian Leszczyński. The party founded the Red Factions within the unions. An electoral list called the "Union of Town and Country Proletariat" was constructed and the party managed to win 130,000 votes and two parliamentary seats in the legislative election of November 1922.

The party's Second Congress gathered in Moscow in August 1923. The leadership overhauled the party program, particularly with regard to the land and national questions, where more Leninist policies were adopted. Autonomous sections of the party were recognised as needed in Poland's eastern regions, which were heavily inhabited by ethnically non-Polish groups (Western Ukraine and Western Belorussia). Within the Communist International (Comintern), the Polish leaders aligned with Grigory Zinoviev and not with the embryonic Left Opposition.

The Polish party was independently minded, and in the Polish Commission convened at the Comintern's Fifth Congress (1924), made efforts to defend both Leon Trotsky and Heinrich Brandler, the leader of the Communist Party of Germany. The main prosecutor in the case against the Polish leadership was Julian Leszczyński, but the Polish Commission was chaired by Stalin. Leszczyński was appointed, without reference to a party congress, to the new party central committee. His task was to "Bolshevise" the KPRP.

The party's Third Congress gathered at Minsk in March 1925 with the slogan "Bolshevisation of the party". This meant that the basic party unit was to be a workplace cell and an all-powerful party apparatus was constructed to decide policy. All factional tendencies were banned. Significantly, the party's name was contracted to "Communist Party of Poland" (KPP). Despite being endorsed by the leadership of the Comintern, Leszczyński's leadership group was independently minded enough to adopt positions on Germany, Bulgaria, and France contrary to those of the Comintern. It was removed from office by yet another Polish Commission. Warski returned to the leadership and the party again pursued attempts to build a united front with the PPS.

=== 1926–1938 ===
==== The KPP and Piłsudski's coup ====
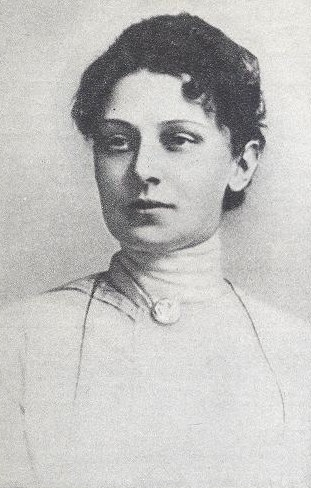
Maria Koszutska

Poland's democratically elected coalition government was conflicted and in 1926 faced serious trouble of economic and other nature. On 12 May, the still-popular, semi-retired General Józef Piłsudski initiated a coup d'etat. Pilsudski, who in his youth and before World War I was a leader of the Polish Socialist Party (PPS), retained in many circles a reputation as a friend of the Left and the Polish communists were among those confused by his present actions. When railway workers went on strike, the PPS declared a general strike. "Even the tiny and illegal Polish Communist Party announced support for what they termed Piłsudski's 'revolutionary armies'." The railway workers were vital, because during the fighting they blocked troop trains trying to deliver reinforcements for the government. On 14 May, the government leaders decided to stop resisting the coup and resigned.

During Piłsudski's May coup, the KPP engaged in street battles with troops loyal to the government of Wincenty Witos, which it called fascist. The KPP leaders directly aided the coup, for which they would pay a steep price. After the events Stalin sharply denounced the KPP leadership and they were eventually ousted for their "May error".

The debate over the "May error" was getting increasingly venomous before and during the party's Fourth Congress in September 1927 in Moscow. In the aftermath, two representatives of the Comintern were placed on the Polish party's Central Committee: the Finn Otto Wille Kuusinen and the Ukrainian Dmitry Manuilsky; the KPP was no longer in a position to exercise any independence of thought and action.

Despite the internal factional struggles, the party grew during this period, attracting support from the minorities and among the working class. It participated in the 1928 Polish legislative election. However, the removal of the Warski group from leadership resulted in the party plunged into isolation as it embarked on the "Third Period". Endorsed by the KPP's Fifth Congress in 1930, the Third Period saw the party routinely describing the PPS as fascist and revolution was claimed to be imminent. As the country was hit severely by the Great Depression, the KPP became embroiled in a new internal struggle.

==== Polish communists in the 1930s ====
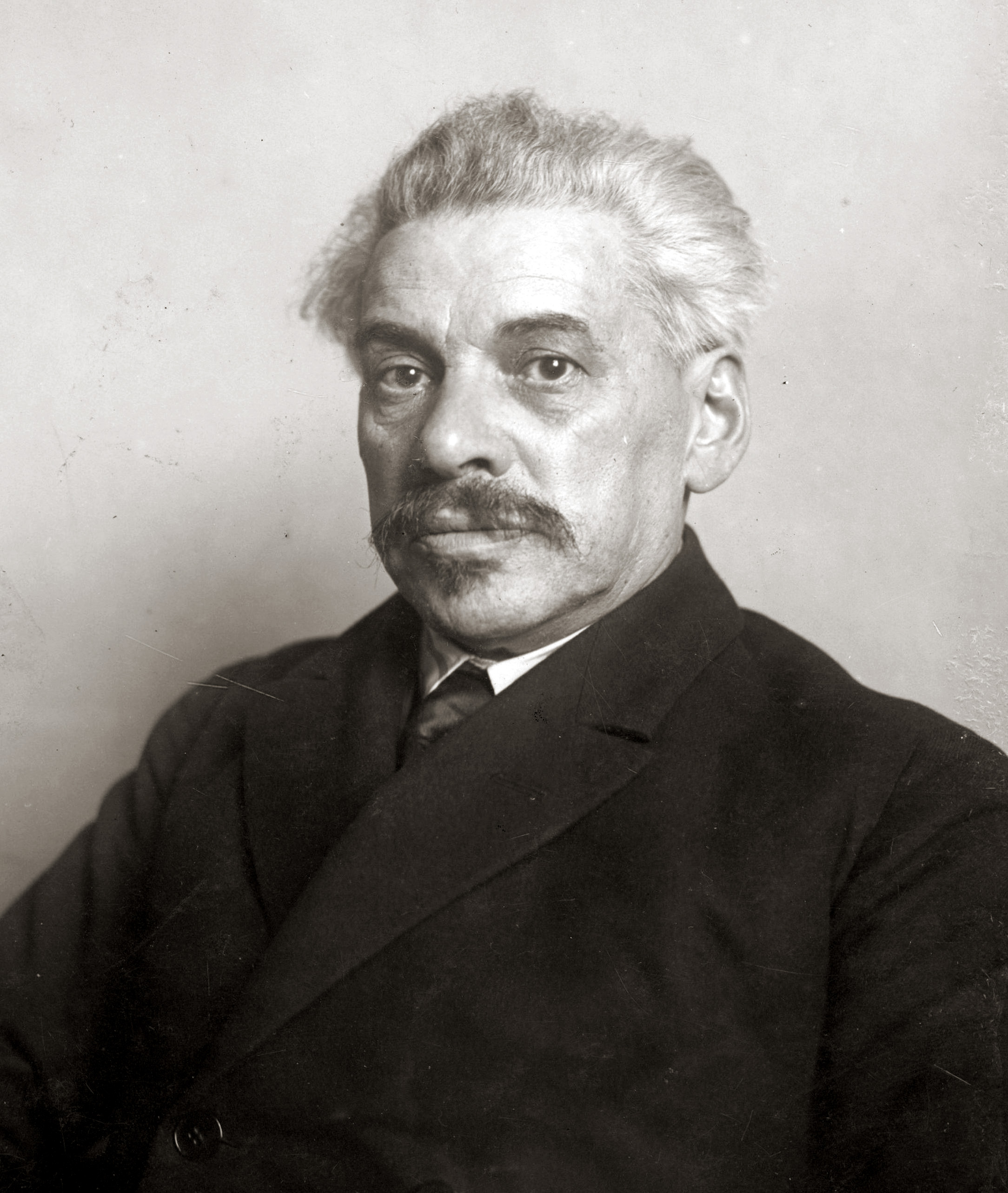
Adolf Warski

The popular front strategy was pursued by the KPP in the mid-1930s. The KPP pressed both the PPS and Bund for unity, which both rebuffed. The communists tried to infiltrate organisations alien to the workers' movement, such as the Peasant Party and even Catholic groups. Unity of the Left remained an impossible goal, however.

Many militants of the KPP joined the International Brigades to fight the Nationalists during the Spanish Civil War. The Dąbrowski Battalion, named for the hero of the Paris Commune, was led by the KPP but counted among its members many PPS workers and other non-KPP volunteers.

==== The KPP liquidated by Stalin ====
Decision of Presidium of Executive Committee of Comintern (IKKI) from 16.08.1938 dissolving Communist Party of Poland. Signatures: Georgi Dimitrov, Manuilsky, Moskvin, Kuusinen, Florin, Ercoli. Full original text of document.

In the mid and late 1930s, the KPP became a victim of paranoia and suspicion that engulfed the communist movement led by Joseph Stalin. It culminated in the Moscow trials and purges. A number of KPP members were accused of being agents of institutions of Sanation Poland and liquidated. Next almost the entire leading cadre of the party became embroiled in the purges and murdered. Many were summoned to Moscow for "consultations". Among those killed were: Albert Bronkowski, Władysław Stein-Krajewski, Józef Unszlicht, Adolf Warski, Maria Koszutska, Maksymilian Horwitz, Julian Leszczyński, Stanisław Bobiński, Jerzy Heryng, Józef Feliks Ciszewski, Tomasz Dąbal, Saul Amsterdam, Bruno Jasieński, and Witold Wandurski. The leaderless party was then accused of Trotskyism among other "deviations"; on August 16, 1938, dissolved by the Comintern. Most of the KPP activists perished in the Great Purge, but among those who survived were some of the future leaders of communist Poland.

== Policies and positions ==
The KPP was guided by Marxist ideology under a strictly orthodox interpretation. It opposed the establishment of a politically independent Poland. Its activists functioned as party members and government officials in Soviet Russia. The KPP was against land reform (distribution of property to landless peasants). It aimed to organize the working class and to unify the trade union movement. It adhered to policies established by the Comintern in Moscow. Its status was illegal, as it refused to register as a political party.

== Demographics ==
The party had a large Jewish membership comparatively to the population of Poland, whereby 10% were Jewish, which began increasing at each congress from the party's formation. 85% of delegates at the party's 2nd National Congress (1926) were Polish, by 1932 (at its sixth and final congress), this percentage had decreased to around 55%. 50% of the party's youth section and 25% of its adult membership were Jewish in 1930, meaning that 1 in 300-500 Polish Jews were members of the party at this time. This proportion of Jewish membership was "significantly higher in the cities" and in those which were in particular large "often exceeded 50%". In Warsaw, the membership was 44% Jewish in 1930, increasing to 67% in 1937 and the district committee for Warsaw being 100% Jewish. In Lublin's district committee, the percentage was around 85% in 1925, declining 58% in 1928 while the party membership in total in the city was 60% in 1930.

Jews made up a significant proportion of the party's leadership; 75% of the KPP's technika, 39% of those that passed through its top management of its politburo, and 54% of its field leadership were Jewish, with Jews additionally making up the majority of those on the KPP central committee. In the party's elite activist core they made up around 40% and "predominated in the leadership's mid-level cadres".

The demographics of the KPP's individual branches in Eastern Poland, then called the Communist Party of Western Belarus (KPZB) and the Communist Party of Western Ukraine (KPZU) were also ethnically diverse. The KPZB was 75-80% Belarusian, 18-20% Jewish and 2-4% Polish in 1924 while the KPZU was 78% Ukrainian, 13.3% Jewish and 8.7% Polish.

Communist support electorally was also concentrated within the minority groups of the Polish Republic. Around 7% of Polish Jews voted for the party from 1922 to 1930.

== The Polish Workers' Party ==
Arriving from the Soviet Union, a group of Polish communists was parachuted into occupied Poland in December 1941. With Stalin's permission, in January 1942 they established the Polish Workers' Party, a new communist party.

== Election results ==
Election	Votes	%	Seats	Seat Change
1919	Boycotted			
1922	121,448	1.4	2 / 444	▲2
1928	217,240	1.9	5 / 444	▲3
1930	40,373	0.36	4 / 444	▼1

== See also ==
- Communism in Poland
- List of Polish Communist Party politicians
- Polish Workers' Party
- Polish United Workers' Party
- Communist Party of Poland (Mijal)
- Polish Communist Party (2002)

== Bibliography ==
- Robert E. Blobaum, Rewolucja. Russian Poland, 1904–1907 (Cornell University 1995).
- Edward H. Carr, The Communist Party of Poland & the May Error (1936; Estratto Annali Dell'istituto Giangiacomo Feltrinelli 1972).
- William J. Chase, Enemies within the Gates? The Comintern and the Stalinist repression, 1934–1939 (Yale University 2001).
- Robert Conquest, The Great Terror. A reassessment (Oxford University 1990).
- Robert Vincent Daniels, The Conscience of the Revolution. Communist opposition in Soviet Russia (New York: Simon and Schuster 1960).
- M. K. Dziewanowski, The Communist Party of Poland. An outline of history (Harvard University 1959, 2d ed. 1976).
- M. K. Dziewanowski, Poland in the 20th century (Columbia University 1977).
- Tony Judt, Reappraisals. Reflections on the forgotten twentieth century (Harmondsworth: Penguin 2008).
- Josef Korbel, Poland between Eadt & West. Soviet & German diplomacy toward Poland 1919–1933 (Princeton University 1963).
- W. J. Rose, Poland (Harmondsworth: A Penguin Special 1939).
- Gabriele Simoncini, The Communist Party of Poland 1919·29: A study in political ideology (Lewiston: Edwin Mellen 1993).
- Richard M. Watt, Bitter Glory. Poland and its fate. 1918–1939 (New York: Simon and Schuster 1979).
- Piotr S. Wandycz, Soviet-Polish Relations, 1917–1921 (Harvard University 1969).
- Jan B. de Weydenthal, The Communists of Poland. An historical outline (Hoover Institute 1978, 2d ed. 1987).
- Ferdynand Zweig, Poland between two wars. A critical study of social and economic change (London: Secker and Warburg 1944).
  - R. F. Leslie, Antony Polonsky, Jan M. Ciechanowski, Z. A. Pelczynski, The History of Poland since 1863 (Cambridge University 1980), edited by Leslie.
  - Adam Daniel Rotfeld & Anatoly V. Torkunov, ed., White Spots Black Spots. Difficult matters in Polish-Russian relations 1918–2008 (University of Pittsburgh 2015).
  - Jaff Schatz, "Jews and the Communist movement in interwar Poland", pp. 13–37, in Dark Times, Dire Decisions. Jews and Communism (Oxford University 2004), edited by Jonathan Frankel.
