= Poles in the Soviet Union =

The Polish minority in the Soviet Union are Polish diaspora who used to reside near or within the borders of the Soviet Union before its dissolution. Some of them continued to live in the post-Soviet states, most notably in Lithuania, Belarus, and Ukraine, the areas historically associated with the Polish–Lithuanian Commonwealth, as well as in Kazakhstan and Azerbaijan among others.

== History of Poles in the Soviet Union ==
=== 1917–1920 ===
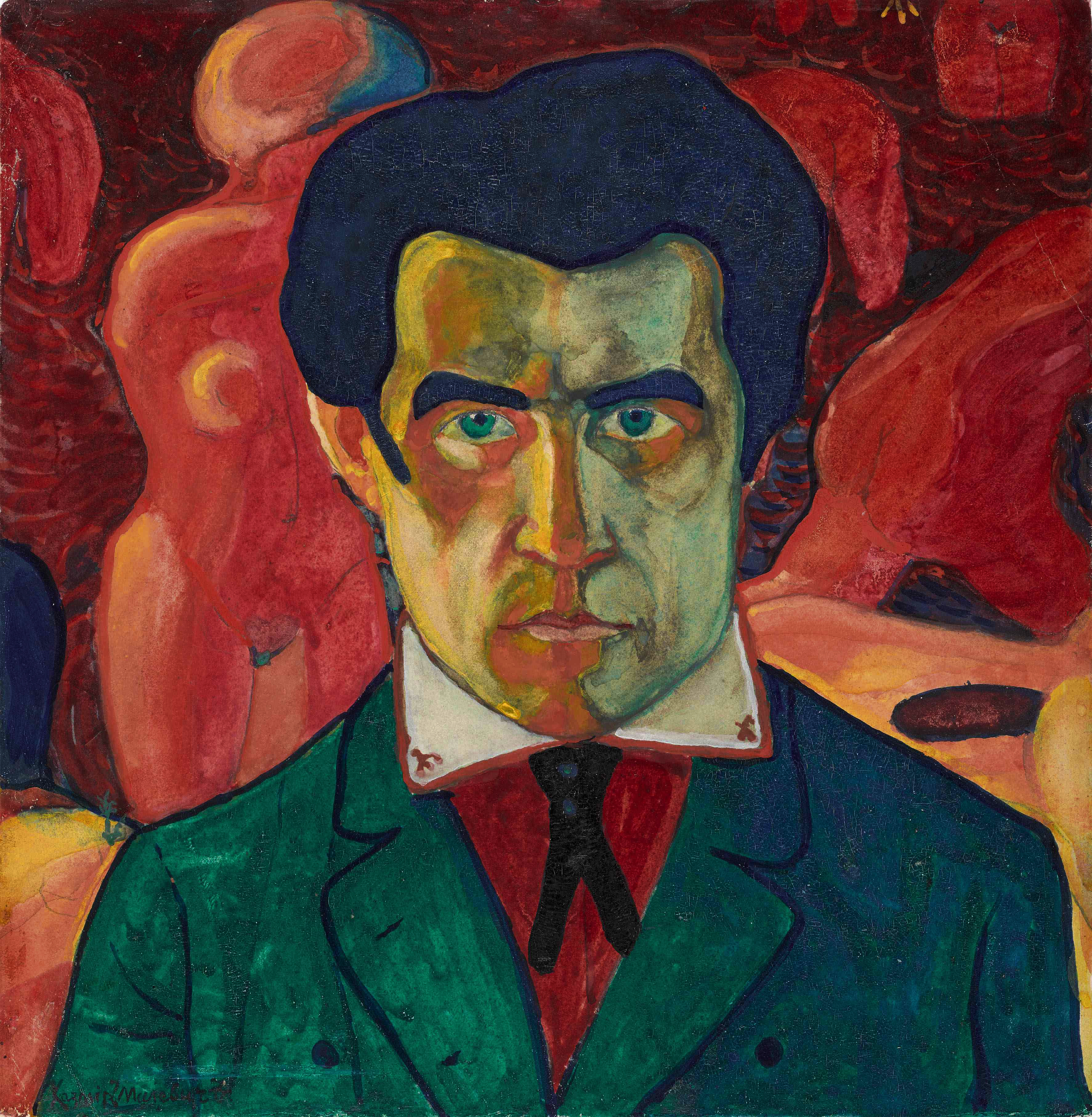
Painter Kazimir Malevich (Kazimierz Malewicz) was a prominent artist of Polish descent active in the Soviet Union. His attempt at settling in Warsaw in 1927 failed.

Millions of Poles lived within the Russian Empire (along with Austria-Hungary and the Prussian Kingdom) following the military Partitions of Poland throughout the 19th century, which resulted in the extinction of the Polish state. After the Russian Revolution of 1917, followed by the Russian Civil War, the majority of the Polish population saw cooperation with the Bolshevik forces as betrayal and treachery to Polish national interests. Polish writer and philosopher Stanisław Ignacy Witkiewicz lived through the Russian Revolution while in St. Petersburg. What he saw, had a profound effect on his works, many of which display themes of the horrors of the Civil War he witnessed. Among the many Polish victims of the revolution was the father of Polish eminent composer Witold Lutosławski, Marian Lutosławski and his brother Józef, murdered in Moscow in 1918 as alleged "counter-revolutionaries".

There were also some Poles (or those of partial Polish descent) associated with the communist movement. Famous revolutionaries include Konstantin Rokossovsky, Vyacheslav Menzhinsky, Julian Marchlewski, Stanislaw Kosior, Karol Świerczewski and Felix Dzerzhinsky, founder of the Cheka secret police which would later turn into the NKVD. The Soviet Union also organized Polish units in the Red Army and a Polish Communist government-in-exile, however the former were persecuted and subject to mock trials following the end of the Second World War and the latter being appointed and installed by the Soviet regime as opposed to the legitimate government-in-exile based in London. Provisional Polish Revolutionary Committee was created in 1920 but failed to control Poland.

=== 1921–1938 ===
Polish communities were inherited from Imperial Russia after the creation of the Soviet Union. After World War I, Poland reestablished itself as an independent country, and its borders with the USSR were finalized by the Peace of Riga in 1921 at the end of the Polish-Soviet War, which left significant territories populated by Poles near or within the confines of the Soviet Union. According to the 1926 Soviet census, there were a total of 782,334 Poles in the USSR. The largest concentration of Poles was in what was then Soviet Ukraine, where according to the Soviet census in 1926 476,435 Poles lived. Those estimates are considered to have been lowered by Soviet officials. Church and independent estimates show estimates of 650,000 to 700,000 Poles living in that area. This suggests that the total Polish population of the USSR was in excess of 1,000,000.

Initially the Soviets pursued a policy where the local national language was used as a tool for eradication of national identity in favour of "communist education of masses". In the case of the Poles this meant a goal of Sovietisation of the Polish population. However this proved extremely difficult as the Soviet communists themselves realised that the Poles were en masse opposed to communist ideology, seeing it as hostile to Polish identity and their predominant Roman Catholic religion. The policy of religious discrimination, plunder and terror further strengthened Polish resistance to Soviet rule. As a result, the Soviet authorities started to imprison and forcefully remove all those seen as an obstacle to their policies.

Two Polish Autonomous Districts were created, with one in Belarus and one in Ukraine. The first one was named Dzierzynszczyzna, after Felix Dzierżyński; the second was named Marchlewszczyzna after Julian Marchlewski. Following the failure of the Sovietisation of the USSR's Polish minority, the Soviet rulers decided to portray Poles as enemies of the state and use them to fuel Ukrainian nationalism in order to direct Ukrainian anger away from the Soviet government. After 1928 Soviet policies turned to outright eradication of Polish national identity. Special centers were established where the youth was indoctrinated towards hatred against the Polish state, all contacts with relatives within Poland were dangerous and could result in imprisonment. Newspapers printed out in the Polish language were de facto used to print anti-Polish propaganda. Following attacks on the Polish minority, from 18 February 1930 till 19 March 1930 over 100,000 people from Polish areas were expelled by the Soviet authorities.

Following the collectivization of agriculture under Joseph Stalin, both autonomies were abolished and their populations were subsequently deported to Kazakhstan in 1934–1938.

In 1936 the Poles were deported from the territories of Belarus and Ukraine adjacent to the state border (the first recorded deportation of a whole ethnic group in the USSR). Tens of thousands of ethnic Poles became victims of the Great Purge in 1937–1938 (see Polish operation of the NKVD). The Communist Party of Poland was also decimated in the Great Purge and was disbanded in 1938. Another decimated group of Poles was the Roman Catholic clergy, who opposed the forced atheization.

A number of Poles fled to Poland during this time, among them Igor Newerly and Tadeusz Borowski.

=== 1939–1947 ===
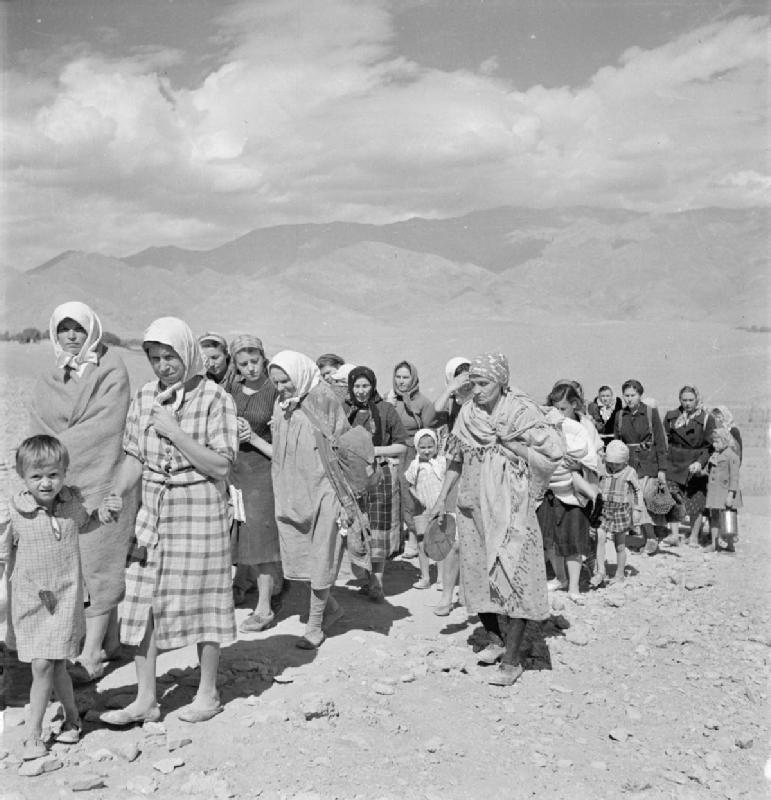
Polish refugees evacuated from the Soviet Union to Iran, 1942

During World War II, after the Soviet invasion of Poland the Soviet Union occupied vast areas of eastern Poland (referred to in Poland as Kresy wschodnie or "eastern Borderlands"), and another 5.2–6.5 million ethnic Poles (from the total population of about 13.5 million residents of these territories) were added, followed by further large-scale forcible deportations to Siberia, Kazakhstan and other remote areas of the Soviet Union.

The number of Poland's citizens held captive in the Soviet Union is a matter of dispute, and ranges from over 300,000 up to nearly 2 million, according to various sources. On March 30, 2004, the head of the Archival Service of Russian Foreign Intelligence Service, General Vasili Khristoforov gave alleged exact numbers of deported Poles. According to him, in 1940 exactly 297,280 Poles were deported, in June 1941 another 40,000. These numbers do not include POWs, prisoners, small groups, people arrested trying to cross the new borders, people who voluntarily moved into the USSR, and men drafted into the Red Army and into construction battalions or stroybats.

In August 1941, following the German attack on the USSR and the dramatic change in Soviet/Polish relations, according to a January 15, 1943, note from Beria to Stalin, 389,041 Polish citizens (including 200,828 ethnic Poles, 90,662 Jews, 31,392 Ukrainians, 27,418 Belarusians, 3,421 Russians, and 2,291 persons of other nationalities) held in special settlements and prisoner of war camps were granted 'amnesty' and allowed to enroll in Polish army units. The location of reception centres was kept secret and no travel facilities provided. Nevertheless, 119,855 Poles were evacuated to Iran with General Anders' army, which subsequently fought alongside the Allies in Iran and Italy; 36,150 were transferred to the Polish Army which fought with the Red Army on the Eastern Front and 11,516 are reported to have died in 1941–1943.

The following are cases of direct executions of Poles during the 1939–1941 occupation:

- Katyn massacre about 22,000
- executions of prisoners after the German invasion 1941.

After World War II most Poles from Kresy were expelled into Poland, but officially 1.3 million stayed in the USSR. Some of them were motivated by the traditional Polish belief that one day they would become again lawful owners of the land they lived on. Some of them were kept forcefully in. Some simply stayed, without force or ideological reasons.

Wanda Wasilewska was an exceptional case – she became a Soviet citizen and did not return after the war.

=== 1947–1991 ===
The Polish minority was one of the few whose numbers decreased over time, according to official statistics. There was also the repatriation of Poles (1955–1959).

After 1989, Poles who survived in Kazakhstan started to emigrate due to national tensions, mainly to Russia and, supported by an immigration society, to Poland. The number remaining is between 50,000 and 100,000.

After the dissolution of the Soviet Union in 1991, the following post-Soviet countries have significant Polish minorities:

- Lithuania, around 250,000 (7% of population), see also Polish minority in Lithuania,
- Belarus, at least 420,000 (almost 4.5% of population), see also Polish minority in Belarus,
- Ukraine, at least 150,000, see also Polish minority in Ukraine,
- Russia, more than 100,000, see also Polish minority in Russia,
- Kazakhstan – between 60,000 and 100,000, see also Poles in Kazakhstan.
- Latvia, around 50,000, see also Poles in Latvia.
- Azerbaijan – between 1,000 and 2,000, see also Poles in Azerbaijan.
- Polish minorities are also found in Georgia, Moldova and Uzbekistan.

== Demographics ==
The Polish population in the Soviet Union peaked in 1959, decreased by about 20% by 1970, and then decreased extremely slowly between 1970 and 1989.

Historical Soviet Polish population
Year	Pop.	±%
1926	782,334	—
1939	630,097	−19.5%
1959	1,380,282	+119.1%
1970	1,167,523	−15.4%
1979	1,150,991	−1.4%
1989	1,126,334	−2.1%

== List of prominent Soviets of Polish descent ==
- Vikenty Veresaev (birth name Smidovich) – writer
- Vatslav Vorovsky (Wacław Worowski) – revolutionary, one of the first Soviet diplomats and head of the state publishing house
- Gleb Krzhizhanovsky – Chief of the Russian Electrification Commission, responsible for fulfillment of the GOELRO program
- Felix Dzerzhinsky (Feliks Dzierżyński) – creator and the first chairman of the Soviet security service, Cheka, later GPU, OGPU (1917–1926)
- Vyacheslav Menzhinsky (Wiaczesław Mienżyński or Mężyński) – chairman of the OGPU (1926–1934)
- Mechislav Kozlovsky – communist diplomat and lawyer
- Kazimir Malevich (Kazimierz Malewicz) – painter, pioneer of geometric abstract art and the originator of the avant-garde, Suprematist movement
- Yury Olesha – writer
- Tomasz Dąbal – communist politician
- Konstantin Rokossovsky (Konstanty Rokossowski) – Marshal of the Soviet Union, planner and director of Operation Bagration (liberation of Belarus, Ukraine and the eastern Poland)
- Konstantin Tsiolkovsky (Ciołkowski) – rocket scientist (with a father of Polish descent)
- Stanislav Kosior (Stanisław Kosior) – General Secretary of the Ukrainian Communist Party, deputy prime minister of the USSR, and a member of the Politburo of the Communist Party of the Soviet Union (CPSU), one of the principal so-called architects of the Ukrainian famine of 1932 to 1933
- Karol Świerczewski – general, commander of the Polish Second Army during the fighting for western Poland and the Battle of Berlin
- Stanislav Poplavsky (Stanisław Popławski) – general, commander of the Polish First Army during the breakthrough of the Pommernstellung (Pomerania Wall) fortification line, securing the Baltic Sea coast, crossing the Odra and Elbe rivers and the battle of Berlin
- Sigizmund Levanevsky (Zygmunt Lewoniewski) – aircraft pilot, explorer of the Arctic
- Andrey Vyshinsky (Andriej or Andrzej Wyszyński) – Prosecutor General of the USSR (1934–1939), the legal mastermind of Joseph Stalin's Great Purge
- Arseny Tarkovsky (Tarkowski) – poet and translator (with a father of Polish descent)
- Andrei Tarkovsky (Tarkowski) – film-maker, writer, film editor, film theorist, theatre and opera director (with a paternal grandfather of Polish descent)
- Dmitri Shostakovich (Szostakowicz) – composer (with a paternal grandfather of Polish descent)
- Rostislav Plyatt – actor (of mixed Polish-Ukrainian descent)
- Mstislav Rostropovich – cellist and conductor (ethnic Russian, with some Polish descent)
- Rolan Bykov – actor (Polish-Jewish descent)
- Edvard Radzinsky – playwright, TV personality
- Edita Piekha (Edyta Piecha) – singer, born in France, moved to USSR
- Anatoly Sobchak – mayor of Saint Petersburg (mixed Russian-Ukrainian-Polish-Czech descent)
- Sergey Yastrzhembsky (Jastrzębski) – Russian politician, President Vladimir Putin’s chief spokesperson on the Second Chechen War, head of the Kremlin’s Information Policy Department, co-ordinating Putin administration's external communications.
- Konstantin Petrzhak – physicist

== See also ==
- Poland–Soviet Union relations
- Polish minority in Russia
- Poles in Ukraine
- Curzon line
- Dzierzynszczyzna
- Marchlewszczyzna
- Osadnik
- Polonia
- Marian Kropyvnytskyi
