= National district =

National district or National District may refer to:

- National District (VHSL), conference of the Virginia High School League (athletics)
- Distrito Nacional, special territorial jurisdiction of the Dominican Republic around its capital
- National districts of the Soviet Union
- National districts of the Russian Federation
