= National districts of the Soviet Union =

National districts or national raions (Russian: Национальные районы) were special raions (administrative units) of the Soviet Union from 1924 up until the 1940s, created to meet the needs of minority ethnic and cultural populations within republics. They were part of the larger policy of korenizatsiia, or "indigenization" pursued during this time.

== Background ==
The Soviet Russia that took over from the Russian Empire in 1917 was not a nation-state, nor was the Soviet leadership committed to turning their country into such a state. In the early Soviet period, even voluntary assimilation was actively discouraged, and the promotion of the national self-consciousness of the non-Russian populations was attempted. Each officially recognized ethnic minority, however small, was granted its own national territory where it enjoyed a certain degree of autonomy, national schools, and national elites.

== List ==
=== Byelorussian Soviet Socialist Republic ===
For Poles in Belarus:

- Dzierżyńszczyzna (1932–1937), centered in Dzyarzhynsk

=== Russian Soviet Federative Socialist Republic ===
For Greeks in Russia:

- Greek Autonomous District (1930–1939), centered in Krymskaya (now Krymsk)
- Shapsung National District (1924-1945), located on the Black Sea in Krasnodar Krai

=== Ukrainian Soviet Socialist Republic ===
For Bulgarians in Ukraine:

- Blahoieve Raion, centered in Blahoieve (now Velykyi Buialyk)
- Kolarivka Raion, centered in Kolarivka (now Sofiivka)
- Vilshanka Raion, centered in Vilshanka

For Germans in Ukraine:

- Luxemburg National German Raion (1924–1939), centered in Luxemburg (now Rozivka)

For Jews in Ukraine:

- Kalinindorf Jewish Raion (1927–1958), centered in Velyka Seideminukha (now Kalynivske, Kherson Oblast)
- Novozlatopil National Jewish Raion (1929–?), centered in Novozlatopil
- Stalindorf National Jewish Raion (1930–?), centered in various settlements over the course of its existence

For Poles in Ukraine:

- Marchlewszczyzna (1925–1935), centered in Marchlewsk (now Dovbysh)

For Russians in Ukraine:

- Chuhuiv Raion (1927–present), centered in Chuhuiv
- Kosiorovsky Russian National Raion (1930–?), centered in various settlements over the course of its existence
- Putyvl Raion (1927–2020), centered in Putyvl
- Sorokyne Raion (1927–2020), centered in Sorokyne
- Stanytsia-Luhanska Raion (1927–2020), centered in Stanytsia Luhanska
- Velyka Pysarivka Raion (1927–2020), centered in Velyka Pysarivka

== See also ==
- Autonomous oblasts of the Soviet Union
- Autonomous Soviet Socialist Republics
- National districts of the Russian Federation
- Polish National District
- Regional ethnic autonomy system of China
