= Poles in Kazakhstan =

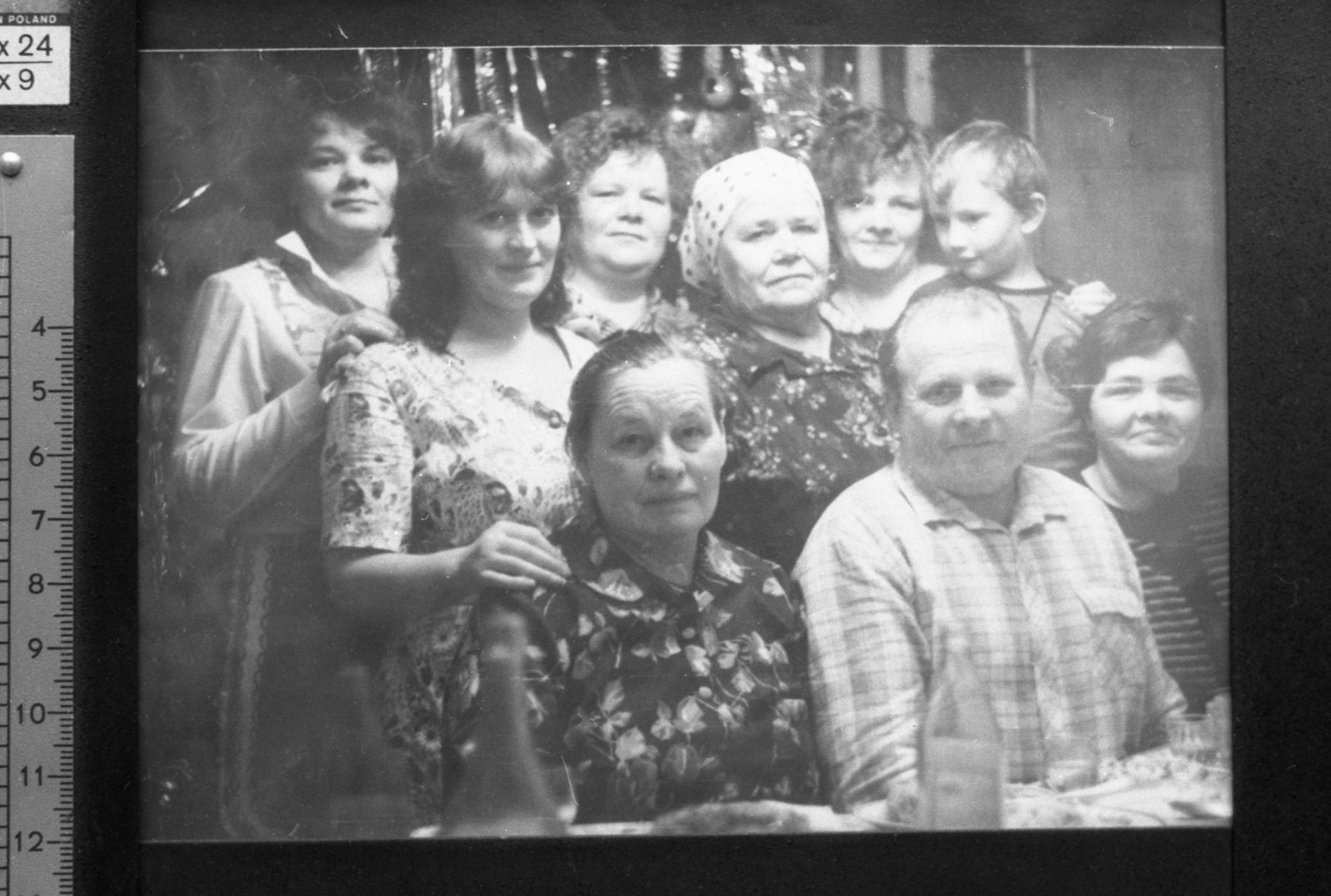
- Polish women in Kazakhstan

Total population
- 49,000 (2014, est.)

Regions with significant populations
- Northern Kazakhstan

Languages
- Primarily Russian; only 12% claim knowledge of Polish

Religion
- Christian

Related ethnic groups
- Polish diaspora

Poles in Kazakhstan form one portion of the Polish diaspora in the former Soviet Union. Slightly less than half of Kazakhstan's Poles live in the Karaganda region, with another 2,500 in Astana, 1,200 in Almaty, and the rest scattered throughout rural regions.

== Migration history ==
=== Arrival ===
The first Pole to travel to the territory which today makes up Kazakhstan was probably Benedict of Poland, sent as part of the delegation of Pope Innocent IV to the Khagan Güyük of the Mongol Empire.

Migration of Poles to Kazakhstan, largely of an involuntary character, began soon after the Kazakh Khanate came under the control of the Russians. Captured participants of the 1830-1831 November Uprising and the 1863-1865 January Uprising, as well as members of clandestine organisations, were sent into exile throughout the Russian Empire. By the time of the Russian Empire Census of 1897, there were already 11,579 Poles in Central Asia, 90 per cent male. Poles both inside and outside of the Soviet Union would later get caught up in Stalinist population transfers in the late 1930s. At least 250,000 Poles from the Polish National Districts of the Soviet Union were deported to the Kazakh SSR in 1930s; among those, as many as 100,000 did not survive the first winter in the country.

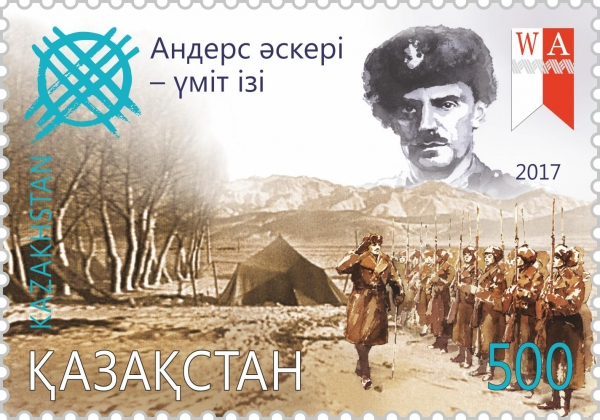
Kazakh postal stamp from 2017 commemorating the Polish Anders' Army

After the Soviet invasion of Poland at the start of World War II, another 150,000 Poles were deported from eastern Polish territories to Kazakhstan; 80% of these were women and children, as the adult men of their community were typically absent due to army service. In early 1942, a portion of the Polish Anders' Army along with civilians was relocated to southern Kazakhstan, whereas the remainder was moved to the Uzbek and Kyrgyz SSRs. The 1st Uhlan Regiment, the 8th Infantry Division and 10th Infantry Division were stationed in Otar, Shokpak and Lugovoy, respectively. The Poles suffered from epidemics and famine and many died. In 1942, the army with many civilians was evacuated to Iran. As of 1943, there were still nearly 77,000 Polish citizens in Kazakhstan, according to Soviet data.

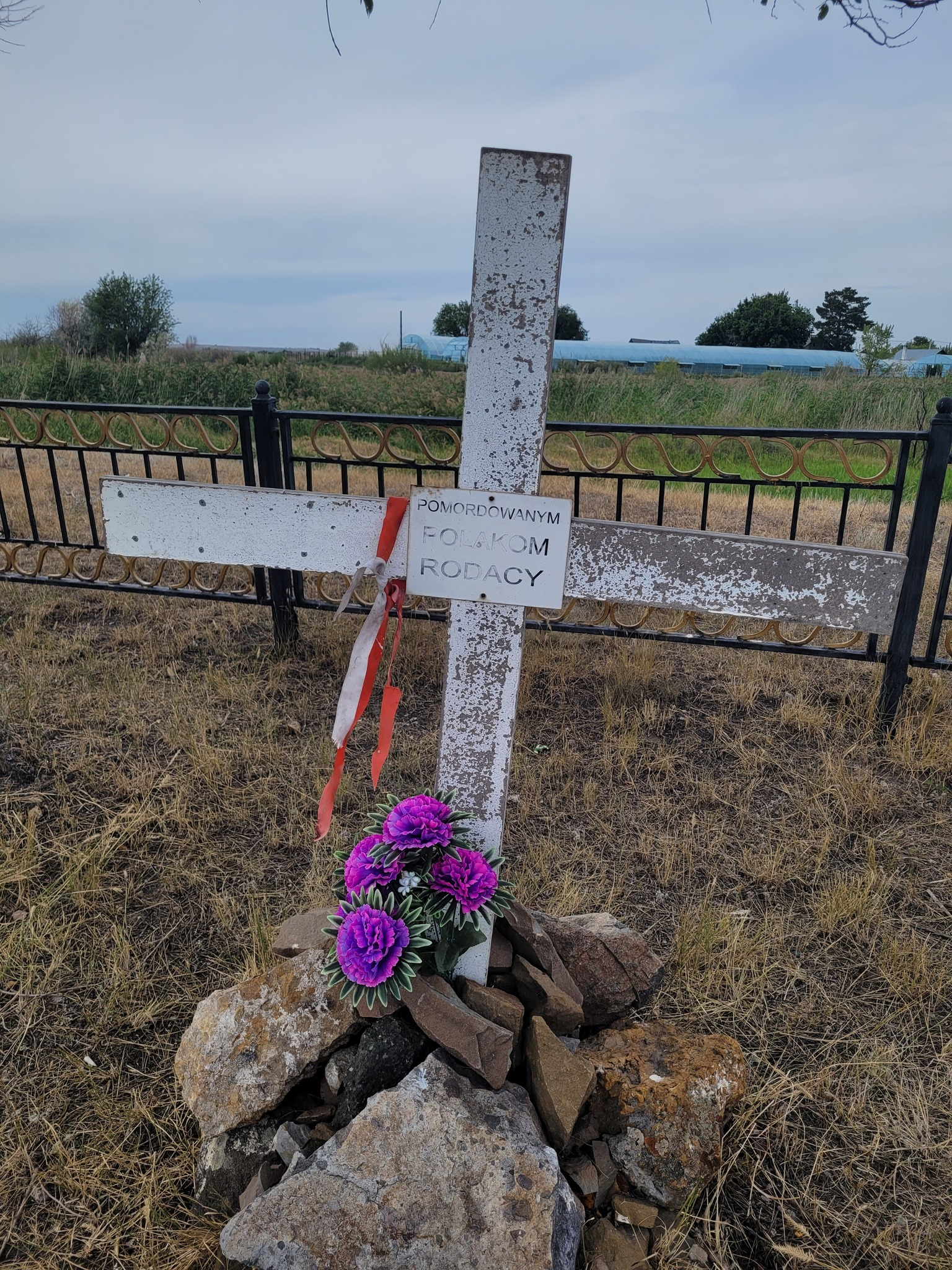
Polish grave cross in Dolinka, Karaganda Region

After the end of the war, people who had been Polish citizens before September 1, 1939 were allowed to repatriate to Poland; however, no provision was made for earlier deportees to leave Kazakhstan. After the war, over 62,000 Poles were repatriated from Kazakhstan to Poland in 1946–1948.

The 1970 Soviet census found 61,400 Poles (0.5% of the population) in the Kazakh SSR, while the 1979 census found 61,100 (0.4%) and the 1989 census 59,400 (0.4%). However, Polish scholars believe these numbers to be underestimates, due to the reluctance of Poles to register their true ethnicity in their official documentation and the relative ease of changing one's declared nationality to another, such as Ukrainian or Russian; they have given numbers ranging from 100,000 to 400,000.

=== Post-Soviet emigration ===
When communist rule in Poland ended, there was great political enthusiasm on the part of the new Polish government for facilitating the repatriation of members of the Polish diaspora. However, up until 1996, there was no formal system for controlling the migration of ethnic Poles from the Soviet Union to Poland. Roughly 1,500 Poles from Kazakhstan came to Poland during this period, often on tourist visas. They were typically granted residency permits, but only a few managed to obtain Polish citizenship. However, legal reforms in 1996 and again in 1998 regularised the immigration procedures, allowing any ethnic Pole from abroad to settle in the country upon receiving an invitation from a company or association. Prospective emigrants were required to apply at the Polish consulate in Kazakhstan with documentary proof of their Polish ancestry.

In a 1996-1998 academic survey, Poles who had emigrated from Kazakhstan cited a number of reasons for their departure, including the decreased social status of non-Kazakh-speakers in the newly independent country, the local economic crisis which saw many salaries go unpaid, and the desire to avoid service in the Kazakhstani army. Some also claimed to survey takers that their female relatives were in danger of bride kidnapping.

Due to their experience with agriculture on kolkhoz during communism, many of the Poles in Kazakhstan were able to obtain invitations from rural communes in Poland, which hoped to revive farms that would otherwise be sold to German expatriates. However, in practise many were specialised with only one type of skill, and lacked familiarity with other aspects of farm operation that they would need in their new lives in Poland. In other cases, Polish students came to Kazakhstan with grants from the Polish Ministry of Education (100 each year), and later invited their family members to join them. There were also reports of people from Poland travelling to Kazakhstan and selling invitations at a high price. The number of repatriates might be as large as 20,000, and is partially reflected by a decrease in the Kazakhstan census' recorded number of Poles in the country.

== Religion ==
The first Polish Catholic church for exiles on the steppe was opened at Orenburg in 1844; another was opened in Omsk in 1862. (Both cities are today part of Russia). By 1917, the church at Petropavlovsk had grown to 3,000 members. During the years of exile and assimilation to Soviet-Russian society, for many Poles the Catholic religion was the only link to their ancestral culture.

== Demographics ==
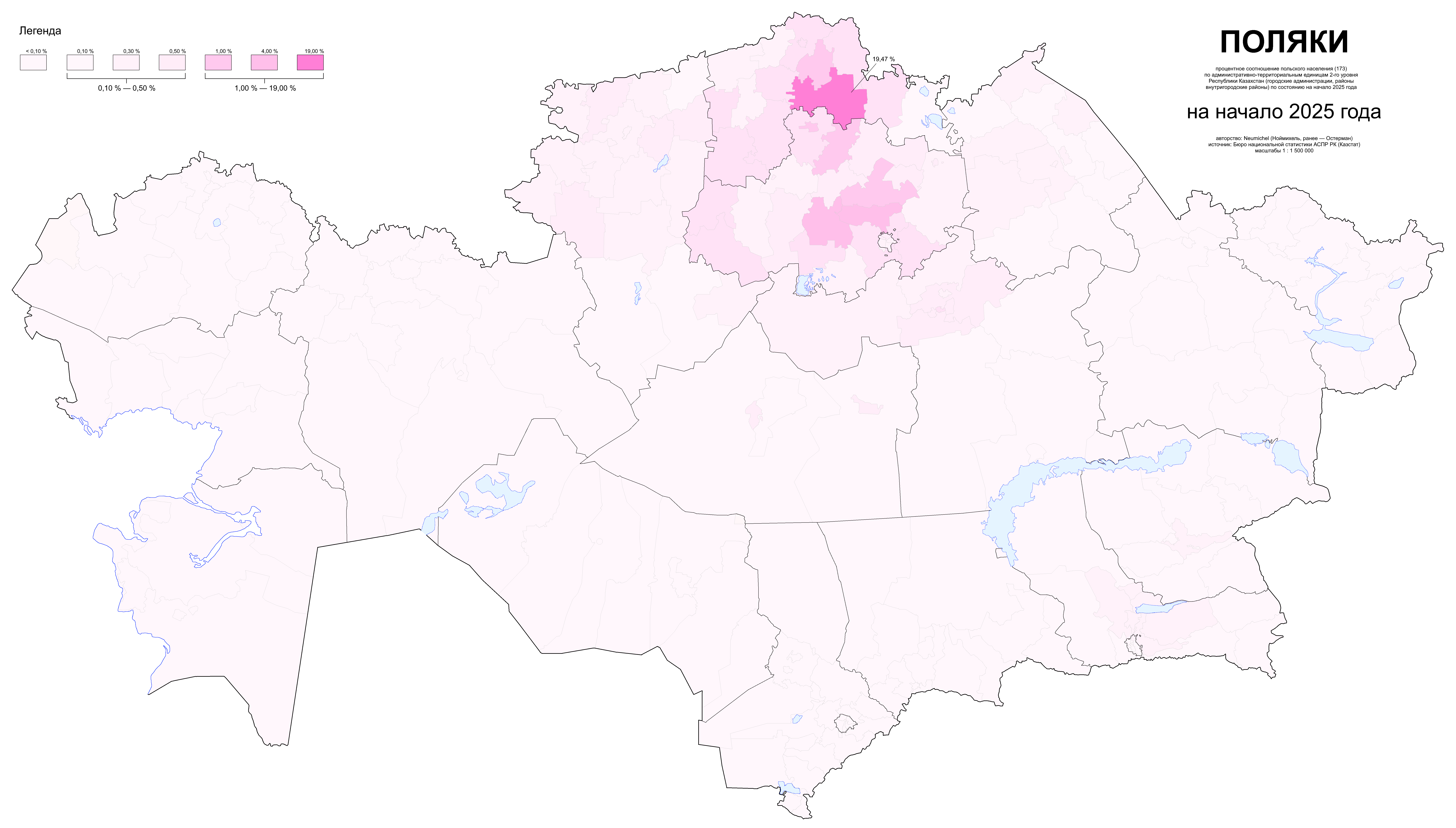
Distribution of Poles in Kazakhstan by districts, estimate as of 2025

Historical population

Year	Pop.	±%
1897	1,254	—
1926	3,762	+200.0%
1939	54,809	+1356.9%
1959	53,102	−3.1%
1970	61,335	+15.5%

Year	Pop.	±%
1979	61,136	−0.3%
1989	59,956	−1.9%
1999	47,297	−21.1%
2009	34,057	−28.0%
2021	35,319	+3.7%

According to official census data:

== Inter-ethnic relations ==
Poles tend to be settled in multi-ethnic regions of Kazakhstan, where settlers and exiles of many other nationalities predominated and members of the titular Kazakh nationality were few. Interethnic marriages between Poles and members of other European ethnic groups were quite common; however, those with members of traditionally Muslim ethnic groups were much rarer. An anthropological study conducted in 1993 found that Poles generally viewed the Kazakhs as lazy but friendly, and generally stated that inter-ethnic relations were good.

== Notable people ==
- Bronisław Zaleski (c. 1819–1880), painter, member of the Polish resistance in the Russian Partition of Poland, exiled to Kazakhstan by the Tsarist government; author of 22 landscape paintings of Kazakhstan.

== See also ==
- Kazakhstan–Poland relations
- Polish diaspora
- Ethnic groups in Kazakhstan

== Sources ==
- Alekseenko, A. N. (2001), "Республика в зеркале переписей населения" (PDF), Sotsiologicheskie Issledovaniia (12): 58–62, archived from the original (PDF) on 2007-06-30
- Grzymala-Moszczynska, Malina (2003), "A study of Polish-origin immigrants to Kazakhstan from Poland", in Adler, Leonore Loeb; Gielen, Uwe Peter (eds.), Migration: immigration and emigration in international perspective, Greenwood Publishing Group, ISBN 978-0-275-97666-8
- Iglicka, Krystyna (1998), "Are They Fellow Countrymen or Not? The Migration of Ethnic Poles from Kazakhstan to Poland", International Migration Review, 32 (4): 995–1014, doi:10.2307/2547669, JSTOR 2547669
- Poujol, Catherine (2007), "Poles in Kazakhstan: Between Integration and the Imagined Motherland", Space, Populations, Societies, 4 (1)
