= Kazakhstan–Poland relations =

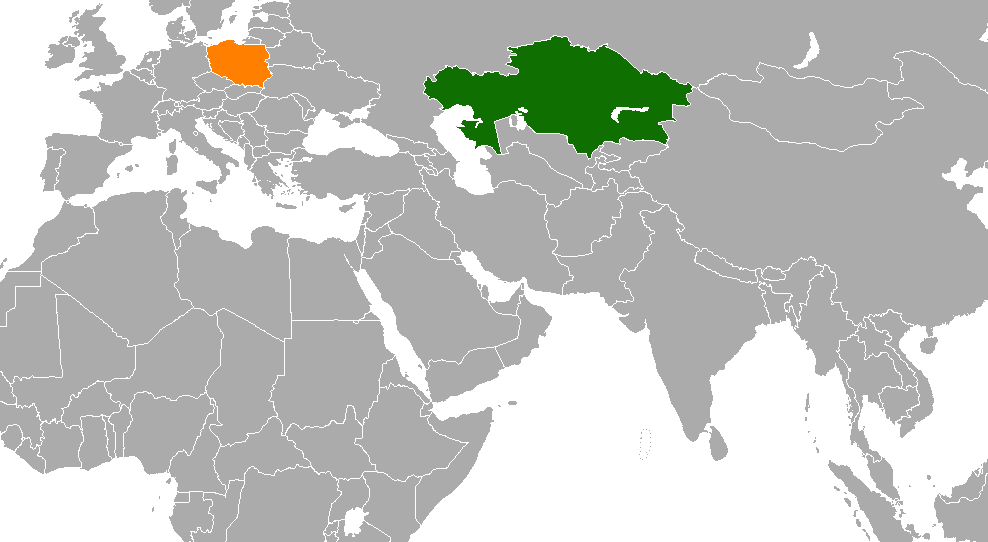

- Kazakhstan: Poland

Kazakhstan–Poland relations refer to bilateral relations between Kazakhstan and Poland. Relations focus on growing trade and political cooperation. Both countries are members of the Organization for Security and Co-operation in Europe, the World Trade Organization and the United Nations.

== History ==
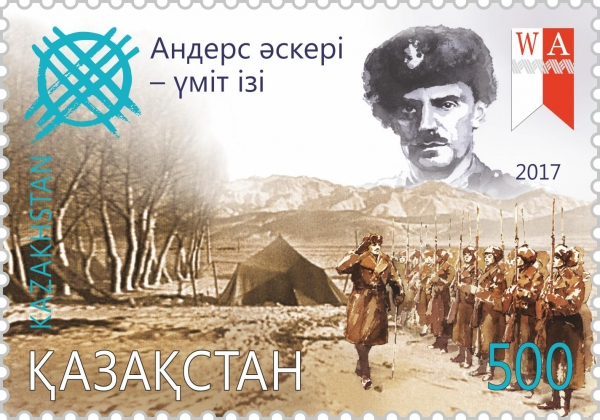
Kazakh postal stamp from 2017 commemorating the Polish Anders' Army

Poland and Kazakhstan have a shared history rooted in the mass deportation of ethnic Poles to the former Kazakh Soviet Socialist Republic of the Soviet Union. Poland funded the publication of the émigré magazine Jas Turkistan, published in Paris from 1929 to 1939, which supported the independence of Central Asia—including Kazakhstan—from the Soviet Union.

Following the joint German-Soviet invasion of Poland, which started World War II in 1939, the Kazakh Soviet Socialist Republic was one of the destinations for the deportations of Poles from Soviet-occupied eastern Poland. After the Sikorski–Mayski agreement, Polish diplomatic posts were established Almaty, Semey, Shymkent, Kostanay, Astana, Pavlodar, Taraz, and Petropavl in 1941–1942. In early 1942, a portion of the Polish Anders' Army along with civilians was relocated to southern Kazakhstan, whereas the remainder was moved to the Uzbek and Kyrgyz SSRs. The 1st Uhlan Regiment, the 8th Infantry Division, and 10th Infantry Division were stationed in Otar, Shokpak and Lugovoy, respectively. The Poles suffered from epidemics and famine, with many dying. In 1942, the army with many civilians was evacuated to Iran. As of 1943, there were still nearly 77,000 Polish citizens in Kazakhstan, according to Soviet data. After the war, over 62,000 Poles were repatriated from the Kazakh SSR to Poland in 1946–1948.

Poland and Kazakhstan established formal diplomatic relations in 1992. A double tax avoidance agreement was signed between the countries in 1995. Several cooperation agreements were signed between the two countries, concerning economy (2006), tourism (2007), defense (2012), education (2014), and agriculture (2016).

== State visits ==
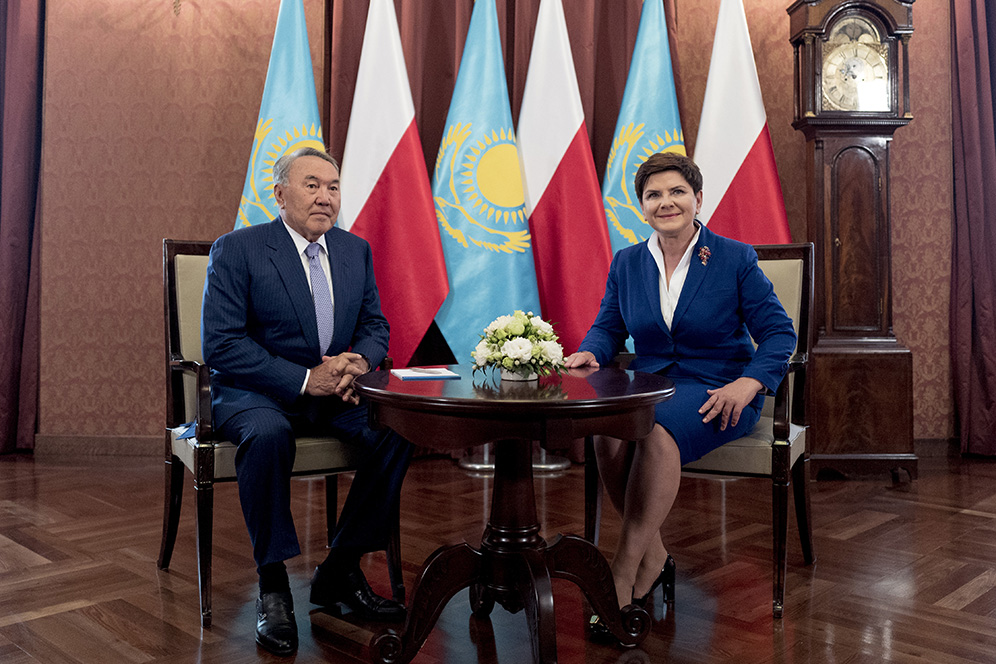
President of Kazakhstan Nursultan Nazarbayev and Prime Minister of Poland Beata Szydło in 2016

The first President of Kazakhstan, Nursultan Nazarbayev, visited Poland on three occasions: on official visits in November 1997 and May 2002, and on a state visit on 23 August 2016. During Nazarbayev’s presidency, Presidents of Poland also visited Kazakhstan three times: Polish presidents Aleksander Kwaśniewski and Lech Kaczyński visited Kazakhstan in 1999 and 2007 respectively, and President Andrzej Duda on a state visit from 6 to 8 September 2017.

From 23 to 26 May 2002, President Nursultan Nazarbayev paid an official visit to the Republic of Poland. During the visit, he held meetings with President Aleksander Kwaśniewski, Marshal of the Sejm Marek Borowski, Marshal of the Senate Longin Pastusiak, and Prime Minister Leszek Miller. The visit included the official opening ceremony of the Embassy of Kazakhstan in Poland, as well as the presentation of Nazarbayev’s book “Peace Is the Word That Defines Everything”. During the visit, President Kwaśniewski awarded Nazarbayev Poland’s highest state decoration, the Order of the White Eagle, while the President of Kazakhstan conferred upon his Polish counterpart the Order of Friendship.

Poland President Andrzej Duda hosted Kazakh President Nursultan Nazarbayev in Poland in 2016 for the Polish–Kazakh Economic Forum.

== Economic relations ==
Trade turnover between the two countries exceeded $2.2 billion in 2014. More than 200 Polish businesses are operating in Kazakhstan that have invested about $130 million in Kazakhstan operations.

Both countries' foreign trade agencies together established the Polish-Kazakh Intergovernmental Commission on Economic Cooperation to build commercial ties between businesses.

== Education ==
Kazakhstani students were the ninth largest group of foreign students in Poland in 2021, 2022, 2023, and 2024, at the same time being the second largest group from Central Asia (after Uzbekistanis).

== Transport links ==
LOT Polish Airlines operates a service from Warsaw to Astana.

== Diplomatic missions ==
- Kazakhstan has an embassy in Warsaw.
- Poland has an embassy in Astana and a consulate-general in Almaty.
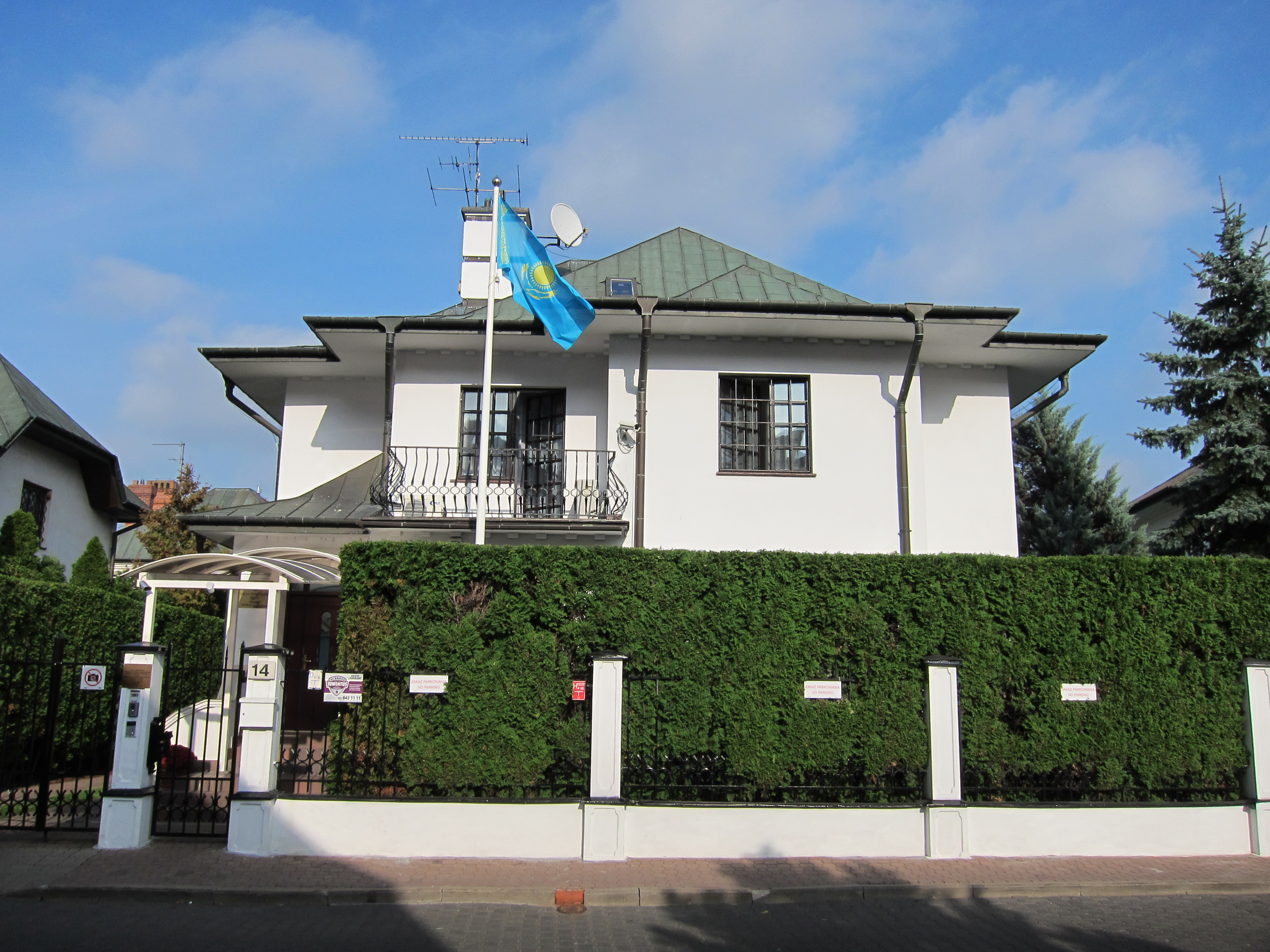
Embassy of Kazakhstan in Warsaw

== See also ==
- Foreign relations of Kazakhstan
- Foreign relations of Poland
- Poles in Kazakhstan
