= Iosif Unshlikht =

Polish and Russian activist (1879–1938)

Józef Unszlicht
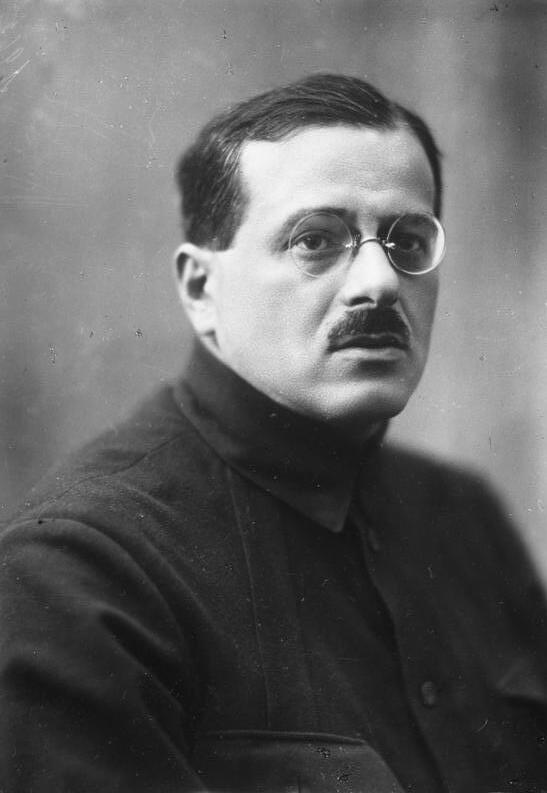

Deputy Chief of the Cheka/GPU/OGPU
- In office 12 April 1921 – 1923
- Prime Minister: Vladimir Lenin
- Preceded by: Ivan Ksenofontov
- Succeeded by: Vyacheslav Menzhinsky

Personal details
- Born: December 31, 1879 Mława, Russian Empire
- Died: July 29, 1938 (aged 58) Moscow, Soviet Union
- Citizenship: Russian Empire; Russian Soviet Federative Socialist Republic; Soviet Union
- Party: Communist Party of the Soviet Union (1917-1935)
- Other political affiliations: Social Democracy of the Kingdom of Poland and Lithuania (1900-1917)
- Profession: Statesman and revolutionary
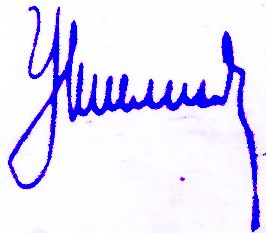
- Signature

Military service
- Allegiance: Russian Soviet Federative Socialist Republic (1918–1922); Soviet Union (1922–1935)
- Branch/service: Red Army; Cheka; GPU; OGPU
- Battles/wars: Russian Civil War; Polish-Soviet War; Vilna offensive

Iosif Stanislavovich Unshlikht (Polish: Józef Unszlicht) (Russian: Ио́сиф Станисла́вович У́ншлихт; nicknames "Jurowski", "Leon"; 31 December 1879 – 29 July 1938) was a Polish and Russian revolutionary activist, a Soviet government official and one of the founders of the Cheka.

== Biography ==
=== Early life (1879–1917) ===
Unszlicht was born on 31 December 1879. He was born in Mława, Płock Governorate, Congress Poland, in a Jewish family. He joined the revolutionary movement in 1896, as a student in Warsaw studying electrical engineering. In 1900, he joined the Social Democracy of the Kingdom of Poland and Lithuania (SDKPiL), led by Rosa Luxemburg and Leo Jogiches. For his conspiratorial activities in Warsaw and Łódź, he was arrested seven times in 1902–13. In 1911, he joined the rozlamovists, a group of mainly younger SDPKiL members, led by Yakov Ganetsky, who opposed Jogiches' leadership methods, and who were close to Vladimir Lenin and the Bolsheviks. The split became so acrimonious that the SDPKiL leadership accused Unszlicht of being a police agent, an accusation that seems to have been baseless.

=== Political activity after the Revolution (1917–1937) ===
At the time of the February Revolution, Unszlicht was in exile in Siberia, where he was elected a member of the Irkutsk soviet, and joined the Bolsheviks. In April, he moved to Petrograd, where he helped organise the Bolsheviks' military organisation. He was arrested for his role in the July Days and held in Krestny prison, but soon released. In December 1917, he was one of the founders of Cheka. In 1919 he served briefly as People's Commissar for Military Affairs in Lithuania and Belarus. In April, he led the defence of Wilno (Vilnius) as it was being overrun by the Polish army, commanded by Józef Piłsudski.

In May 1920, after the Polish army had been forced to retreat, Unszlicht ingratiated Lenin by advising him that if the Red Army invaded Poland, they would be welcomed as liberators by the Polish workers and peasants. During the Polish–Soviet War, he was a member of the Provisional Polish Revolutionary Committee, which would have become the government of communist Poland had the Poles lost the war.

In 1921, Unszlicht was appointed Deputy head of Cheka, under Felix Dzerzhinsky, but they fell out in 1923, after a series of bomb attacks in Warsaw, which Unszlicht appears to have instigated, without consulting Dzerzhinsky or the leadership of the Communist Party of Poland. He was transferred to the post of chief of supply for the Red Army, although Leon Trotsky, the People's Commissar for War, regarded him as "an ambitious but talentless intriguer" who had been placed there to undermine him. On 6 February 1925, he was appointed Deputy People's Commissar for War. He led over 7000 troops in an offensive against uprisings in Chechnya during the summer of 1925.

In 1930, he was transferred to economic work, in an apparent demotion. In September 1933, he was appointed head of the Civil Air Fleet. In February 1935, he replaced Avel Yenukidze as Secretary of the All-Russian Central Executive Committee of the Soviet Union.

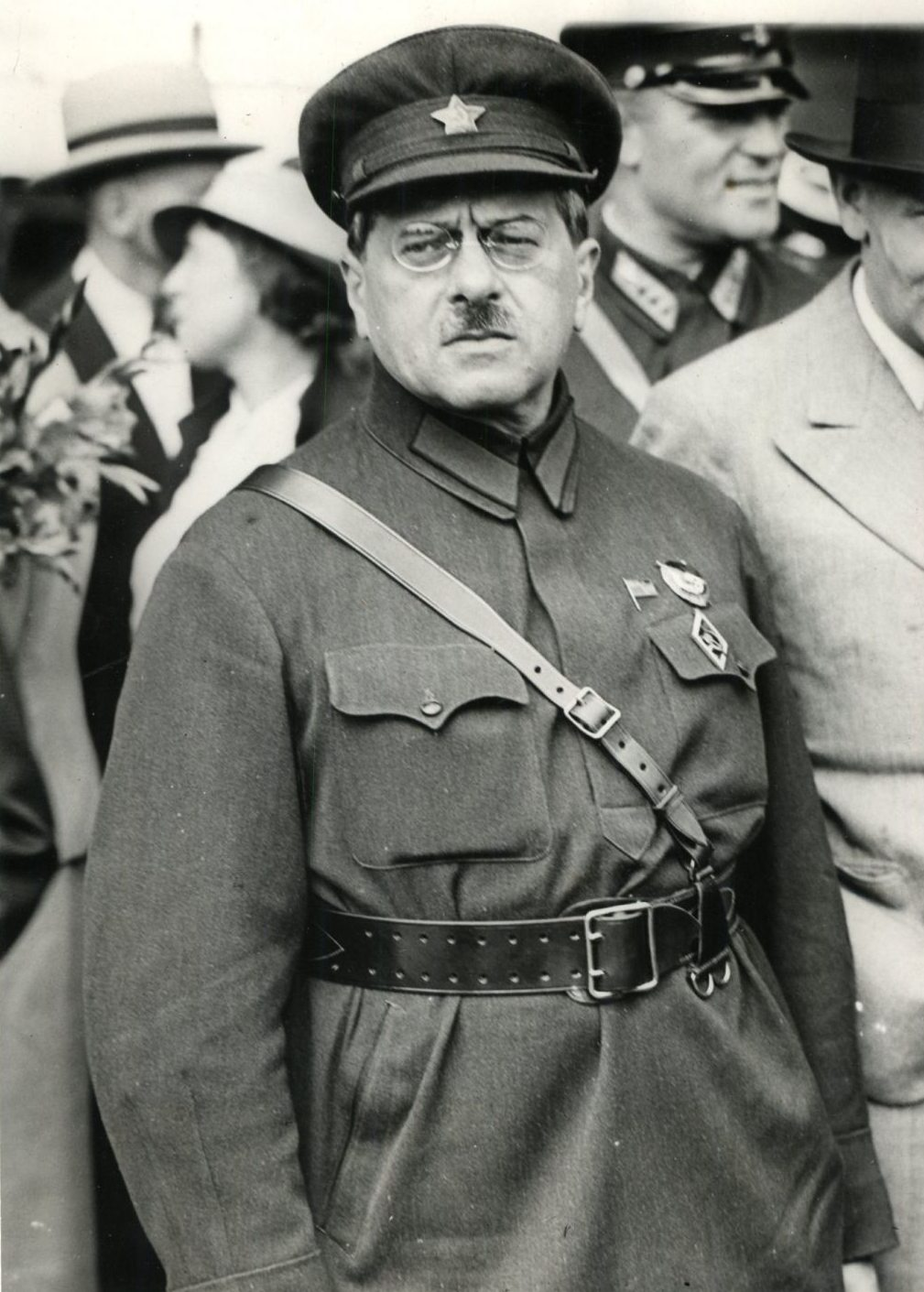
Head of the Chief Directorate of the Civil Air Fleet (1935)

=== Arrest and execution ===
Józef Unszlicht was arrested on 11 June 1937. Two weeks later, the head of the NKVD, Nikolay Yezhov told a plenum of the Central Committee of the Communist Party that the police had uncovered a "Polish Military Organisation" (POV) of spies who had infiltrated the USSR by posing as political émigrés, and named Unszlicht as its leader. He confessed under interrogation, and named as his 'accomplices' most of the leading members of the Polish Communist Party in exile, who were arrested and shot. He retracted his testimony during his 20-minute trial, on 28 July 1938, saying that he had never been a member of the POV and confessed only because "he could not endure a long interrogation" – implying that his interrogators had used sleep deprivation to break him – but was sentenced to death and executed at the Kommunarka shooting ground on 29 July 1938. He was rehabilitated in 1956.

== Family ==
Unszlicht's brother Julian was a journalist who "fought against the socialist movement in general and especially against Jewish involvement in it." In later years, Julian converted to Catholicism and joined the priesthood. His sisters were Zofia Unszlicht-Osińska (executed in the purges) and Stefania Brun, wife of the literary critic and communist activist Julian Brun.

His wife, Stefania was arrested for being the wife of a convicted counter-revolutionary and sentenced in August 1938 to either five or eight years in labour camps. She was released in 1943. They had a son, Kasimir, a student and member of Komsomol, who died in 1929, aged 19.

According to Walter Krivitsky, an intelligence officer who defected to the West, Unszlicht had a nephew, Max Maximov-Unszlicht, who was chief of the Soviet military intelligence operating in Nazi Germany for nearly three years and was also arrested and probably executed during the Great Purge.

== Honours and awards ==
Order of the Red Banner
