= Districts of Russia =

List of districts

Map of subdivisions of Russia

A district (raion) is an administrative and municipal division of a federal subject of Russia.

As of 2023, excluding Moscow, St. Petersburg, and Sevastopol, there are 1,893 administrative districts (including the 20 in the Russian-occupied territories of Ukraine occupied by Russia) and 1,823 municipal districts (also including the 14 in the Republic of Crimea) in Russia. All these districts have an administrative center, which is usually the same locality for both the administrative and municipal entity. If the three federal cities is included, there will be a total of 2,040 districts in Russia. Most western federal subjects are divided into smaller districts, while eastern federal subjects are divided into larger districts.

In modern Russia, division into administrative districts largely remained unchanged after the dissolution of the Soviet Union. The term "district" ("raion") is used to refer to an administrative division of a federal subject or to a district of a big city.

In two federal subjects, however, the terminology was changed to reflect national specifics: in Sakha, where they are known as ulus (улус), and in Tuva, where they are known as kozhuun (кожуун).

== Hierarchy ==
Within the framework of administrative divisions, the administrative districts are on the same level of hierarchy as the cities of federal subject significance and may be further subdivided into towns of district significance, urban-type settlements of district significance, and selsoviets, although the exact terms for these entities vary from one federal subject to another.

Within the framework of municipal divisions, the municipal districts are on the same level of hierarchy as urban okrugs and are further subdivided into urban settlements, rural settlements, or both. Municipal districts are commonly formed within the boundaries of existing administrative districts, although in practice there are some exceptions to this rule.

== Municipal district ==
A municipal district (муниципа́льный райо́н) is a type of municipal formation which comprises a group of urban or rural settlements, as well as inter-settlement territories, sharing a common territory. The concept of the municipal districts was introduced in the early 2000s and codified on the federal level during the 2004 municipal reform.

Municipal districts are commonly formed within the boundaries of existing administrative districts, although in practice there are some exceptions to this rule—Sortavalsky Municipal District in the Republic of Karelia, for example, is formed around the town of Sortavala, which neither has a status of nor is a part of any administrative district.

== City districts ==
Many major cities in Russia—except for federal cities of Moscow and Saint Petersburg—are divided into city districts. Such city districts are usually considered to be administrative divisions of the city and prior to 2014 could not be a separate municipal formation. Examples of such city districts are Sovetsky City District in Nizhny Novgorod and Adlersky City District in Sochi.

== Occupied territories of Ukraine ==
The Republic of Crimea is a federal subject of Russia formed on the territory of the Crimean Peninsula, which is disputed between Russia and Ukraine. Within the Russian legal framework, the districts of the Autonomous Republic of Crimea (an administrative division of Ukraine) continue to be in use. The federal city of Sevastopol is also located on the peninsula, with its districts having a status similar to that of the districts of Moscow and St. Petersburg. Along with Crimea, the federal subjects of the Donetsk People's Republic, Kherson Oblast, the Luhansk People's Republic and Zaporozhye Oblast also continues to use the same districts prior to the 2020 reforms.

== See also ==
- List of districts in Russia
- National districts of the Russian Federation, special ethnically-based districts
