= Markhlevsk Raion =

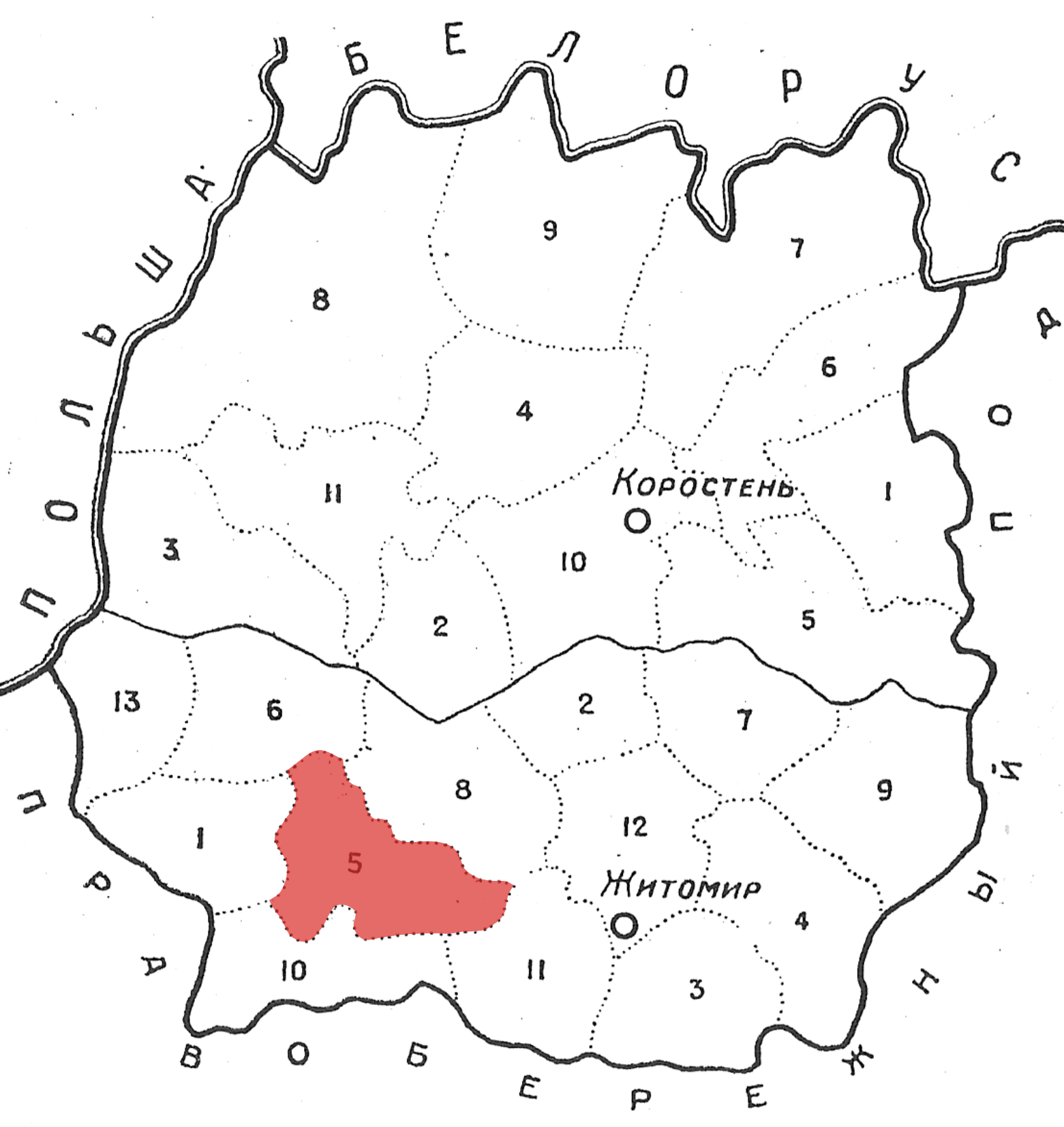
Markhlevsk Raion on the map of western part of Polissia Subdistrict in 1926

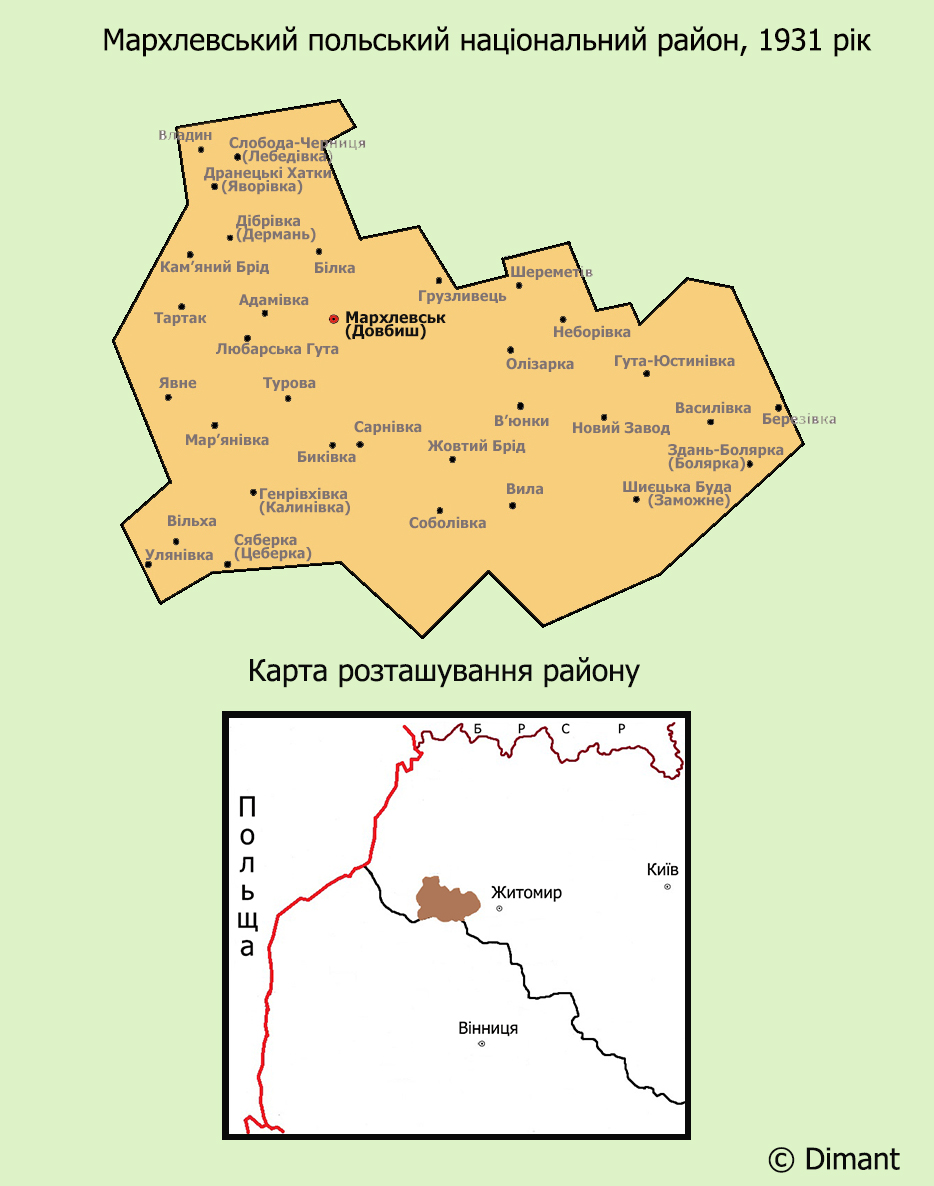
Map of the district in 1931

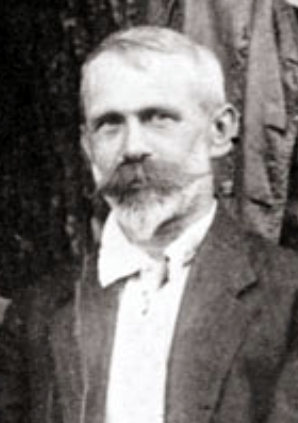
Julian Marchlewski

Map showing both the German Raion of Pulin and the Polish Raion of Marchlewsk in 1930—1935

Markhlevsk Raion (Ukrainian: Мархлевський польський національний район; Polish: Polski Rejon Narodowy im. Juliana Marchlewskiego) was a Polish National District in the Ukrainian Soviet Socialist Republic created as an experiment and as part of the Soviet korenizatsia campaign in Zhytomyr Okruha to the west of Zhytomyr on 21 July 1925 by resolution of the Little Presidium of the All-Ukrainian Central Executive Committee. Informally, it was known as Marchlewszczyna, particularly in the local printing media. Its capital, the town of Dovbysh, was renamed later in 1926 as Markhlevsk (Polish: Marchlewsk).

The district was one of 32 other national districts that were created in the Ukrainian SSR during that period (1924-1939). It was also one of two Polish National Districts (rayon) that existed in the Soviet Union. Markhlevsk Raion bordered the German National District of Pulin (Pulyny Raion).

The creation of the district was based on standards adopted by the fourth session of the All-Ukrainian Central Executive Committee (15-19 February 1925) and recommendations of the Central Commission in affairs of National Minorities at that executive committee. It was created to implement the idea of establishing Polish national districts on the territories of Ukrainian and Belarusian SSRs. In 1935, the raion was abolished and split between Chervonoarmiyskyi Raion (former German National District of Pulin) and Baranivka Raion; selected rural communities of the district were transferred to the Zhytomyr and Novohrad-Volynskyi municipalities.

== History ==
The district was located far away from the railroad in an area numerically dominated by settlements of khutor type (farmsteads). The village of Dovbysh was a small settlement around the Dovbysh porcelain factory. The district did not have telephone and telegraph communications and by general estimates it was economically backwards. Initially the district was composed of 26 rural communities (selsoviets) with a general area of 620 km2. Later 108 populated places were united into 34 communities (30 Polish, 2 Ukrainian, 2 German). In percentage terms the population consisted of 68.8% Polish people, 19.2% Ukrainians, 8.8% Germans, 2.5% Jews and 0.5% of Russians. In 1932 the number of communities increased to 38, 34 of which were Polish.

The official opening ceremony of the district took place on 27 March 1926 with the participation of Felix Dzerzhinsky, Feliks Kon, Samuil Lazovert, Boleslav Skarbek and Józef Unszlicht at the First district congress of Soviets (27–30 April 1926), where in total 103 delegates and 500 visitors took part. The newly created district received valuable presents: from the Moscow Factory "Tribuna" were 2 tractors with ploughs, from the "Pratsia" association radio receivers, from the Polish department of the People's Commissariat of Enlightenment of the Ukrainian SSR otoscopes. In 1927 took place the Second congress of Soviets of Marchlewski District at which were present Tomasz Dąbal, Samuil Lazovert and Boleslav Skarbek. During the celebration of the tenth anniversary of the 1917 October Revolution, the Polish District was visited by a Polish delegation.

As a type of Soviet propaganda, the subdivision was located just 50 km (31 mi) from the eastern border of the Second Polish Republic and was named after the Polish Bolshevik Julian Marchlewski, who was a rector of the Communist University of the National Minorities of the West and dreamed of Poland becoming part of the Soviet Union. Markhlevsk Raion had to become an exemplary autonomous district where Bolsheviks sought to demonstrate to their western neighbor Poland that the Polish people, as a nation, would also submit to the "government of workers and peasants". The function of the Polish District had boldly expressed its political composition, as the leader of the Polish section of the Central Commission in affairs of National Minorities Jan Saulewicz had spoken about more than once.

The raion was established out of the already existing Pulyny Raion. Later in 1930 the rest of the Pulyny Raion was transformed into a German National District. Soon after the establishment of the Marchlewski Polish National District, territorial division by governorates in the Ukrainian SSR was abolished and Markhlevsk Raion became part at first of Zhytomyr Okruha and after the establishing of Kyiv Oblast in 1932, part of Novohrad Volynskyi Okruha.

In the initial years of the district's existence, local Poles enjoyed limited autonomy, with 55 Polish-language schools, 80 reading rooms and a Polish daily Marchlewszczyzna Radziecka (Soviet Marchlewszczyzna). At the same time, its inhabitants were subject to intense communist propaganda. Polish grammar rules, regarded as bourgeoisie, were changed; however, the district lacked educated people. The majority of its inhabitants were Catholic peasants who were not interested in communist ideas. Therefore, such persons as Tomasz Dąbal were brought there to propagate atheism. An organization named the Polish Anti-Catholic Section was also founded.

As one of the Dovbysh residents recalled, after local elections, some newly elected officials were soon arrested and taken away in "Chornyi voronok" (an NKVD car, which, in particular, was used to carry detainees). Among them was Jan Trybel, the father of Halyna (Helena) Trybel, who spent 20 years in exile. Halyna Trybel happened to be a mother of Yuriy Yekhanurov.

The Soviet authorities, who wanted to create Polish laborers, future citizens of the Polish Soviet Republic, built several factories as well as power plants and telephone lines. This also brought about an improvement in the quality of life, but all efforts were destroyed in the early 1930s, when the collectivization in the Soviet Union began. Polish peasants opposed it fiercely, and thousands of them perished in the Holodomor.

Initially, ethnic Poles constituted around 70% of the district's population, which in 1926 totalled around 41,000. Other inhabitants were Ukrainians (20%), Germans (7%), and Jews. In 1930, after several adjacent villages were added to Markhlevsk Raion, the population grew to 52,000, with Poles still constituting 70%. It has been estimated that the district consisted of around 100 villages, settlements, and smaller towns.

In spring 1935, Markhlevsk Raion was included in the Novohrad-Volynskyi Okrug of the Kyiv Oblast as part of the six newly created border okrugs (special administrative divisions) along the Polish border. Already in the fall of the same year by resolution of the Central Executive Committee of the Soviet Union (signed by Grigoriy Petrovskiy) the Polish national raion was abolished and split between the newly formed Chervonoarmiyskyi Raion and Baranivka Raion, Kyiv Oblast, while some communities were also transferred to either Novohrad-Volynskyi or Zhytomyr municipalities. The official reason for the raion liquidation was due to economic weakness, the impracticality of servicing collective farms via Machine-Tractor Stations (MTS), and the fragmented administrative layout. In Zhytomyr Oblast, the former Markhlevsk Raion appeared upon creation of the oblast in 1938.

Soon after the dissolution of the Soviet Union, since 1996, in the local town school, the Polish language is being taught once again by the efforts of the local Polish Society of Jan Paul II. Already in 1990 in Dovbysh the local Catholic parish was revived.

== See also ==
- Dzierżyńszczyzna, a similar district in Soviet Belarus
