= Regional ethnic autonomy system of China =

Administrative system in China

Regional ethnic autonomy system
- Simplified Chinese: 民族区域自治制度
- Traditional Chinese: 民族區域自治制度
Transcriptions
Standard Mandarin
- Hanyu Pinyin: Mínzú qūyù zìzhì zhìdù

In the People's Republic of China, the regional ethnic autonomy system is a term used by the government for its political system of governing bodies designed specifically for ethnic minorities in the country. This system was aimed at achieving ethnic equality in China.

It is based on People’s Republic of China Regional Ethnic Autonomy Law enacted in 1984 amended in 2001 and Provisions on Implementing the Regional Ethnic Autonomy Law enacted in 2005.

== History ==
In 1941, Ethnical Regional Autonomy System was experimented by Mao Zedong led government in Shaan-Gan-Ning Border Region. In the governmental principal file, ethnic Mongolian and Chinese Muslim were to establish autonomous region based on ethnical equality principle. It was a reflection against Qing dynasty's devious ethnic policy as well as a result of studying Soviet Union's ethnical policy.

In 1947, Mongolian Autonomous Region was established. After that, various autonomous regions, prefectures, and counties were established in 1950-1963 and 1979–1990, with some exceptions like Tibet Autonomous Region in 1965 and the latest Beichuan Qiang Autonomous County in 2003. Ethnic Autonomy Region were generally established in areas where more than 20% of the population is ethnic minority people.

== Autonomous government body ==
The autonomous government body are People's Congress and People's Government. As other Chinese political power structure. The real governmental power lies flexibly between Party's Commission and People's Government.

The administrative level of autonomous government body is principally decided by the population and area of the region. Autonomous regions is the highest level of administrative body in China, with the same status of a province, followed by autonomous prefecture and autonomous county.

== Autonomous governments' rights and policy guidelines ==
Autonomous government has the right to make ethnic laws, improvisingly execute specific ethnic related issues, enjoy relatively higher economic independence and higher reserve fund in central government, have a separate ethnic related budget in Chinese State Council, enjoy independent cultural control to a certain degree, use the major ethnic minority language as official language, organize local police militia. But law making and execution power need permission from National People's Congress and State Council respectively.

== Ethnic minority benefit in China ==
=== Government jobs ===
The head of people's government and people's congress should be ethnic minority person.

In the people's congress, when multiple ethnicities live in the same autonomous region, every ethnicity should have representatives, especially giving low population ethnicities considerable more representative positions.

In the people's government, the consisting personals and the belonging branches should try their best to employ ethnic minority officials, and when there are ethnic minority candidates who meets the selecting criteria, they should be priorly employed.

The ratio of ethnic minority officials should correlate to the ratio of ethnic minority population in the region, when the ethnic minority population is over 1/2 of the local population, and should be higher than the ratio of ethnic minority population, when is lower than 1/2.

=== Bonus points in Gaokao ===
According to different policies in different Chinese provincial gaokao committee, the ethnic minority students residing in ethnic autonomous regions can get free bonus points, varying from 10 to 35 in total 750 points.

=== Respect for ethnic custom in university ===
In Chinese universities, the undergraduate education still go on by grouping students into classes. And the ethnic minority students will be asked about the special custom and culture by the supervisors. The supervisors and university staff would try to avoid taboo and offences to ethnic minorities. Due to the large number of Chinese Muslims, most Chinese universities have a specific dining section for them.

== Law on Promoting Ethnic Unity and Progress ==
The Law on Promoting Ethnic Unity and Progress is a legislation in China concerning ethnic minorities. The law was introduced by the National People's Congress (NPC)'s Ethnic Affairs Committee and submitted to the NPC on 8 September 2025. It was adopted by the NPC on 12 March 2026 and signed by President Xi Jinping on the same day, with the law slated to go into effect on 1 July 2026. The law codifies Xi Jinping's policies regarding ethnic minorities and sinicization. The law has been criticized by scholars and human rights activists outside of China and its promotion of extraterritorial enforcement has been likened to transnational repression.

== See also ==
- Autonomous regions of China
- National districts of the Soviet Union
