= Polish Soviet Socialist Republic =

1920 proposal for a Soviet Union republic

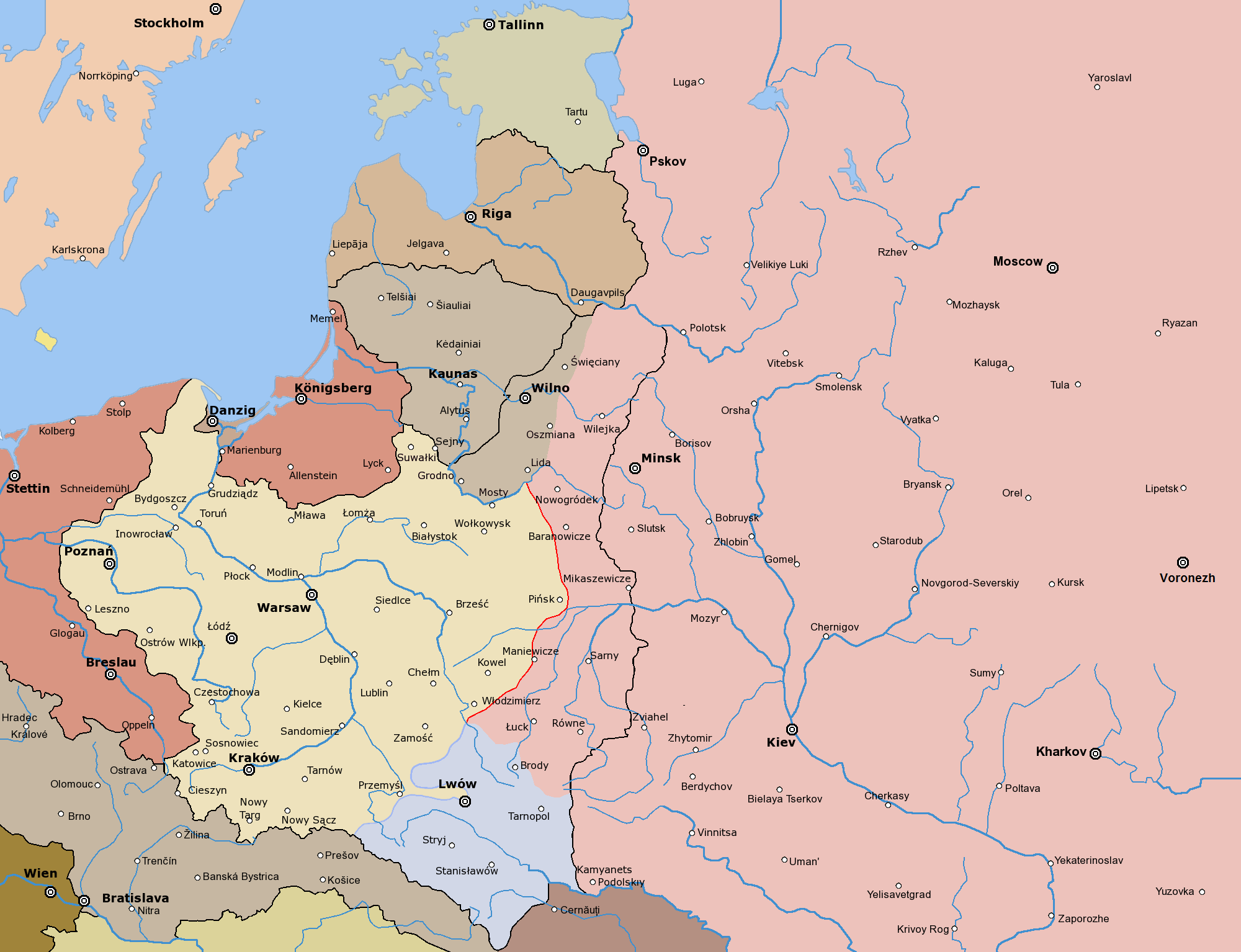
Poland in March 1919, before the beginning of the Polish–Soviet War.

The Manifesto to the Polish working class of towns and villages by Felix Dzerzhinsky, in which the Provisional Polish Revolutionary Committee had announced its position for Polish SSR.

The Polish Soviet Socialist Republic, (Note: Polish: Polska Socjalistyczna Republika Rad; Russian: Польская Советская Социалистическая Республика) abbreviated to Polish SSR, (Note: Polish: Polska SRR; Russian: Польская ССР) was a proposal by the Provisional Polish Revolutionary Committee to establish a constituent republic of the Soviet Union for the Polish population, that emerged during the Polish–Soviet War in 1920. The idea assumed the formation of a Soviet republic from the territory of the Second Polish Republic, following Soviet victory in the war, however it was never executed, as Poland won the war in 1921.

== History ==
The idea was proposed in 1920 by the Provisional Polish Revolutionary Committee during the Polish–Soviet War. It assumed the creation of a constituent republic of the Soviet Union for the Polish population from the conquered territories of the Second Polish Republic, following Soviet victory in the war.

The Provisional Polish Revolutionary Committee was formed by the Communist Party of the Soviet Union, as a provisional government from territories of Poland conquered during the war. It announced its governance over the state on 30 July 1920, in Białystok, the first major city west of the Curzon Line. The committee announced its plan to create a Polish SSR in its Manifesto to the Polish working class of towns and villages (Polish: Manifest do polskiego ludu roboczego miast i wsi) by Felix Dzerzhinsky, which was announced in Vilnius on 30 July 1920. It stated, that the committee planned to create the Soviet republic following a Bolshevik takeover of the entirety of Poland.

== See also ==
- East Polish Soviet Socialist Republic
- Galician Soviet Socialist Republic
- Socialist Soviet Republic of Lithuania and Belorussia
- Polish People's Republic
- Polish National District
