= Julian Marchlewski =

Polish politician and activist

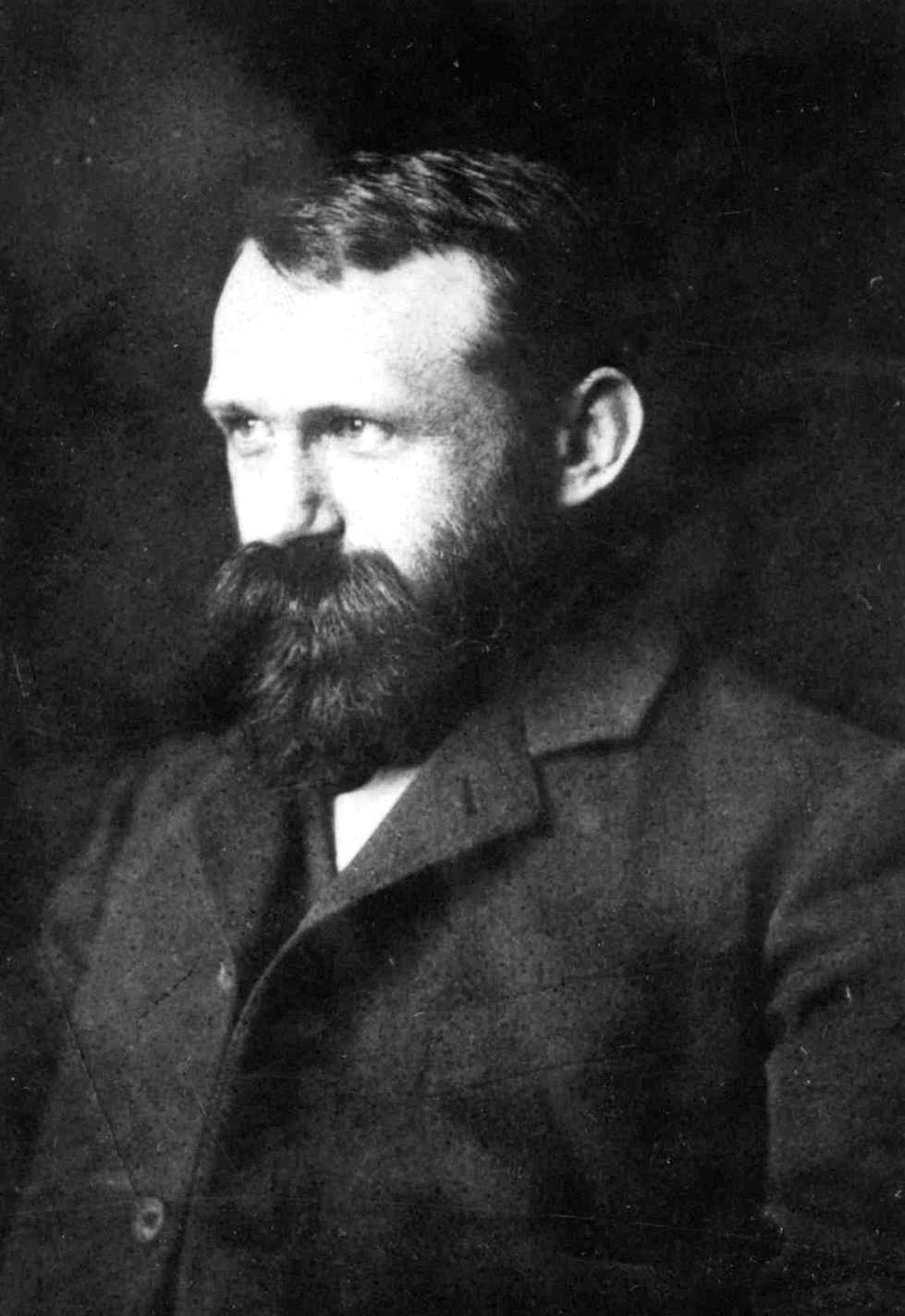
- Born: Julian Baltazar Józef Marchlewski; 17 May 1867; Włocławek, Congress Poland, Russian Empire
- Died: 22 March 1925 (aged 57); Nervi, Genoa, Kingdom of Italy
- Citizenship: Russian Empire; Soviet Union
- Education: University of Zurich
- Occupations: Lawyer, journalist, art critic, economist
- Political party: SDKPiL; SPD; KPD; VKP(b)

Julian Baltazar Józef Marchlewski (17 May 1866 – 22 March 1925) was a Polish communist politician, revolutionary activist and publicist who served as chairman of the Provisional Polish Revolutionary Committee. He was also known under the aliases Karski and Kujawiak.

== Life and career ==
Julian Marchlewski was born in Włocławek, which was then under Russian rule, to a Polish Catholic father and a German Protestant mother, both of whom were of noble origin. There was no tradition of political dissent in his family. As a student in Warsaw he joined a Marxist group called The Proletariat. After completing high education in 1885, he sought employment as a weaver or dyer, in factories in Poland and Germany. He returned to Poland, and in 1889, he co-founded the Polish Workers' Union, with Adolf Warski and Bronisław Wesołowski, which focused on the immediate needs of Polish workers, such as pay and working conditions. Arrested in 1891, after the government moved in to end a wave of strikes by Polish workers, he spent a year in prison, in Warsaw. After his release in 1892, he emigrated to Switzerland and joined Rosa Luxemburg and Leo Jogiches in co-founding the Social Democratic Party of the Kingdom of Poland (SDKP) (later renamed the SDPKiL after a merger with a small Polish-Lithuanian Marxist party led by Felix Dzerzhinsky). In 1896, he received a doctorate from Zurich University, after which he settled in Dresden, in Germany, where he and Alexander Parvus launched a newspaper, Sächsische Arbeiterzeitung, which they edited until they were both expelled from Saxony, in September 1898. They moved to Munich, where they ran a publishing venture.

Marchlewski returned to Russian-occupied Poland, after 13 years abroad, during the Russian Revolution of 1905 in the Polish territories. Early in 1906, the SDPKiL sent him to Belgium to buy weapons. In June, he and Dzerzhinsky presided over the Fifth SDPKiL congress, in Zakopane, where they decided to affiliate with the Russian Social Democratic Labour Party (RSDLP), which was split between Bolsheviks and Mensheviks, and to align with Vladimir Lenin and the Bolsheviks. Late in 1906, he was arrested, but the police could not establish who he was, and he was released early in 1907. In May 1907, he part of the SDPKiL delegation at the London Congress of the RSDLP, and was elected an alternate member of the Central Committee.

After the failure of the 1905 revolution, Marchlewski returned to Germany, where he lived semi-illegally for nine years. His partnership with Parvus as it emerged that Parvus's management had bankrupted their publishing venture. He worked as a journalist writing for newspapers run by the German Social Democratic Party until September 1913 when, as acting editor of Leipziger Volkszeitung, he was barred by the party from publishing an article by Rosa Luxemburg. He broke off relations with the SDP leadership, which he believed had become 'revisionist' - i.e. no longer revolutionary. In December 1913, he launched a new journal, Sozialdemokratische Korrespondenz, using his flat as the editorial office, with himself, Rosa Luxemburg and Franz Mehring as the regular contributors. On the outbreak of war in 1914, he joined the small anti-war group within the SDP, led by Rosa Luxemburg and Karl Liebknecht, originally known as Gruppe Internationale, later as Spartakusbund, the forerunner of the German Communist Party. Marchlewski was arrested in January 1916, and was in a German prison during the Russian Revolution, but was released in June 1918 as part of a prisoner exchange that followed the Treaty of Brest-Litovsk and was deported to Russia, where he joined the Bolsheviks. He was named as a Soviet diplomatic representative first in Vienna, and in October his name was put forward as the first soviet ambassador in Poland, but never took up either post, because neither the Austrians nor the Poles recognised the Soviet regime, and instead stayed in Russia organising Polish communists.

In January 1919, he returned to Berlin illegally, after being refused entry at the German border, to help found the German Communist Party, and was dispatched to the Ruhr. After Liebknecht and Luxemburg had been murdered, in Berlin, he noticed that police were trailing him, and in disguise he joined a group of agricultural workers who were heading home to Galicia, which was now in Poland. Arriving there in March, he made contact with Józef Piłsudski, Commander in Chief of the Polish army. By pointing that the heads of the White Army, who were seeking to overthrow the Bolsheviks, had no intention of recognising Poland's independence, he persuaded Piłsudski to recognise him as a go-between to negotiate a settlement between Poland the Soviet Union. Returning to Moscow in June, he secured Lenin's support, but ran up against angry opposition from exiled leaders of the Polish communist party. His first attempt to conduct negotiations, in July 1919, was a failure, and included his being roughed by Polish soldiers at the border. He crossed the border again in August, as head of a Soviet Red Cross mission, with "bowler hat, wing-collar and a Gladstone bag", but again the talks broke down in December. In July 1920, during the Polish-Soviet War, Marchlewski was appointed Chairman of the Polish Provisional Revolutionary Committee (Tymczasowy Komitet Rewolucyjny Polski) in Białystok, implying that he would have been head of the Polish government had the Red Army won the war, though real power would probably have bene exercised by Dzerzhinsky, nominally his deputy.

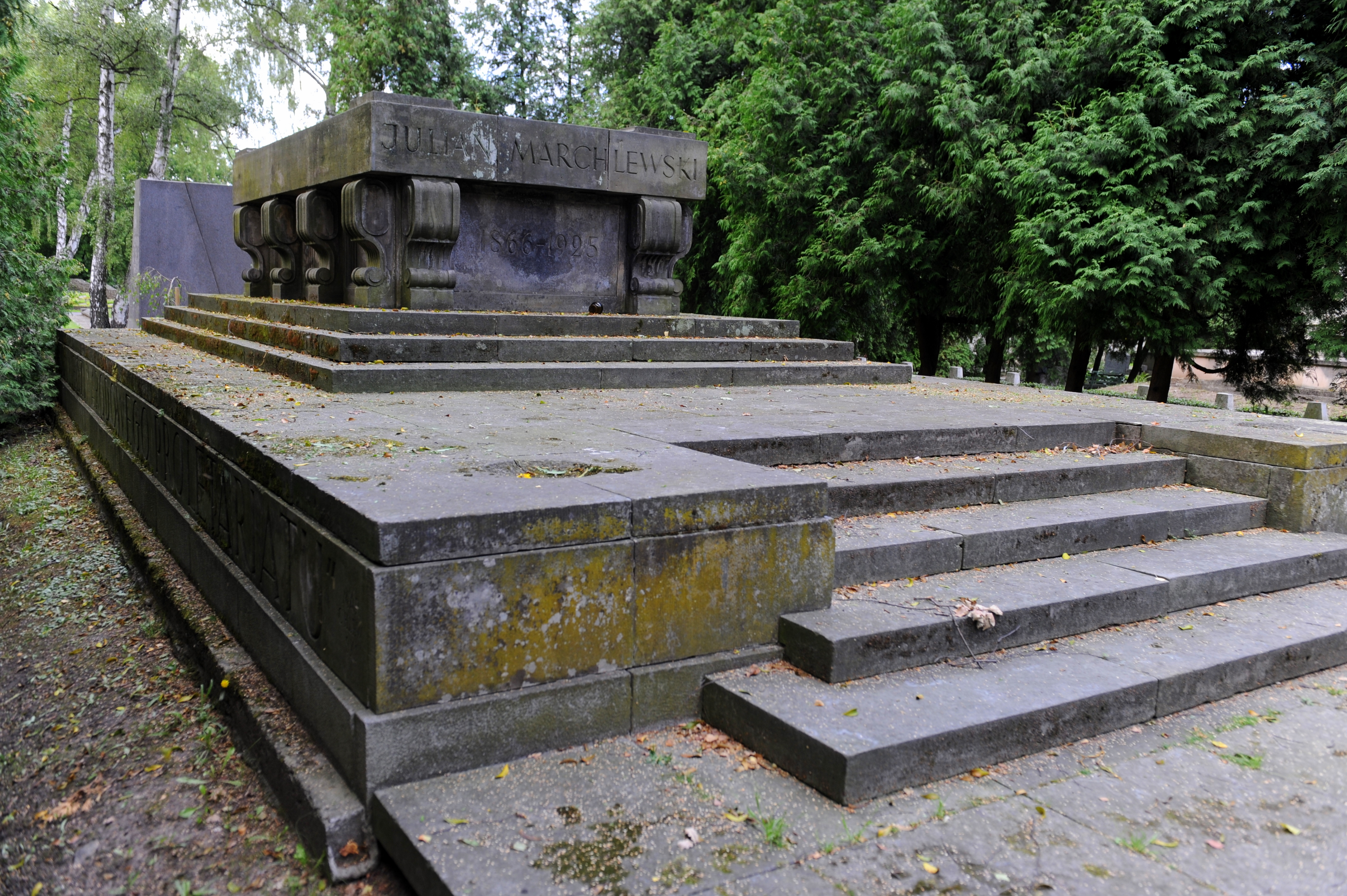
Julian Marchlewski's grave at the Powązki Military Cemetery in Warsaw

In autumn 1921, Marchlewski was sent on a long diplomatic mission to China. He returned in June 1922. He was the first rector of the Communist University of the National Minorities of the West. As an economist, he was an expert in agriculture and took part in the preparation of the Bolshevik program with respect to the peasantry. Marchlewski also wrote scientific and theoretical works on history, philosophy and culture. He died near Nervi, Italy in 1925 during a vacation.

His body was returned to Poland, where he was interred at Powązki Military Cemetery in Warsaw. His daughter Sonja was the second wife of the artist Heinrich Vogeler and his younger brother was the chemist Leon Marchlewski.

== Legacy ==
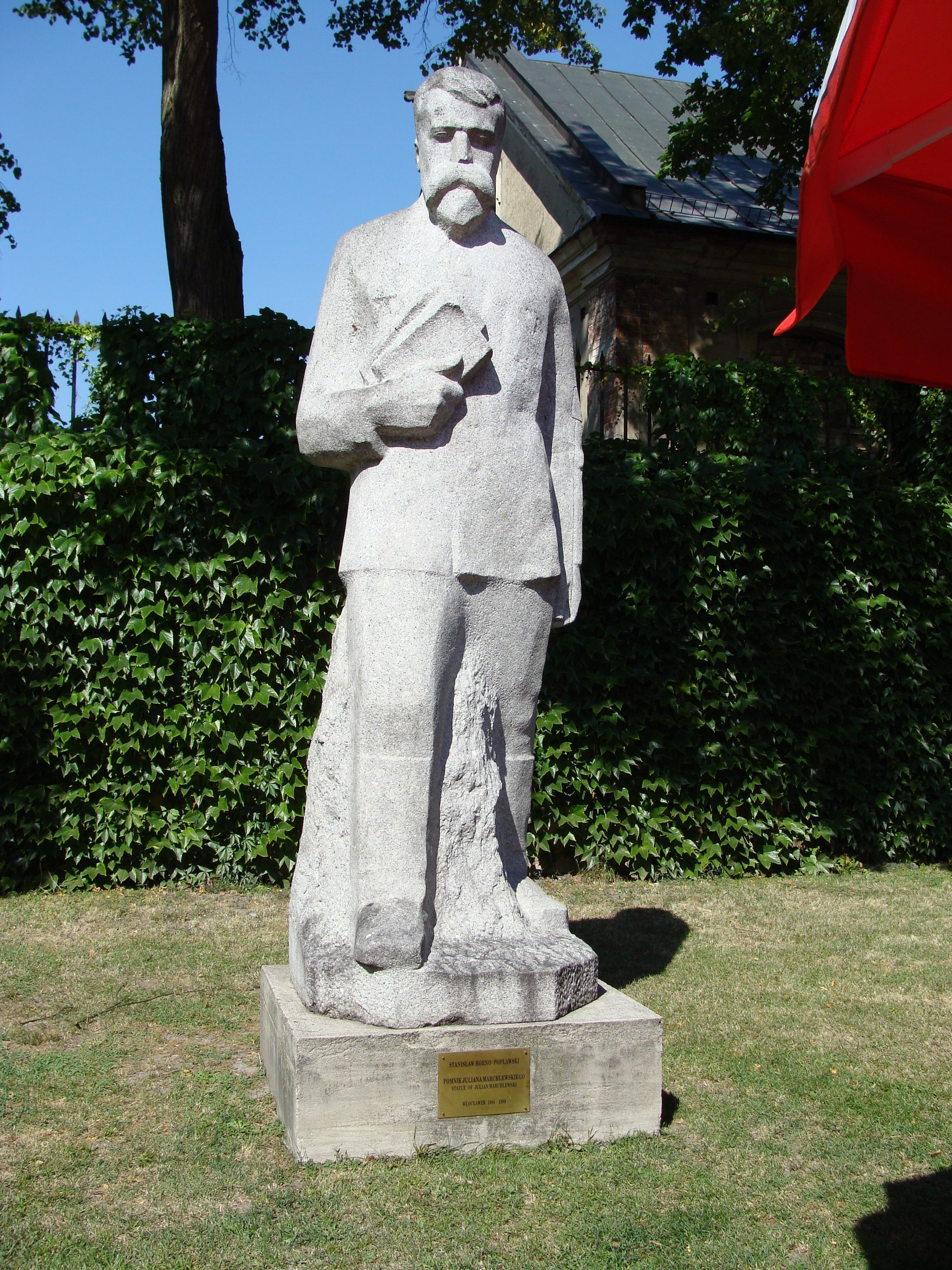
Monument to Julian Marchlewski

In 1926, he was the namesake for the Polish National Raion in Ukraine (Marchlewszczyzna), with the capital at Marchlewsk (known before and after as Dovbysh and Shchorsk; a similar Polish district of Dzierżyńszczyzna, named after Felix Dzerzhinsky, was in Belarus). Warsaw's Jan Paweł II Street was formerly called Marchlewski Street.

Panzerregiment 23 (23rd Tank Regiment) "Julian Marchlewski", part of the 9th Panzer Division of the Land Forces of the National People's Army, was named in his honor. The regiment disbanded along with the entire National People's Army when Germany reunified in 1990.
