= Dovbysh =

Rural locality in Zhytomyr Oblast, Ukraine

Dovbysh Довбиш
- Rural settlement
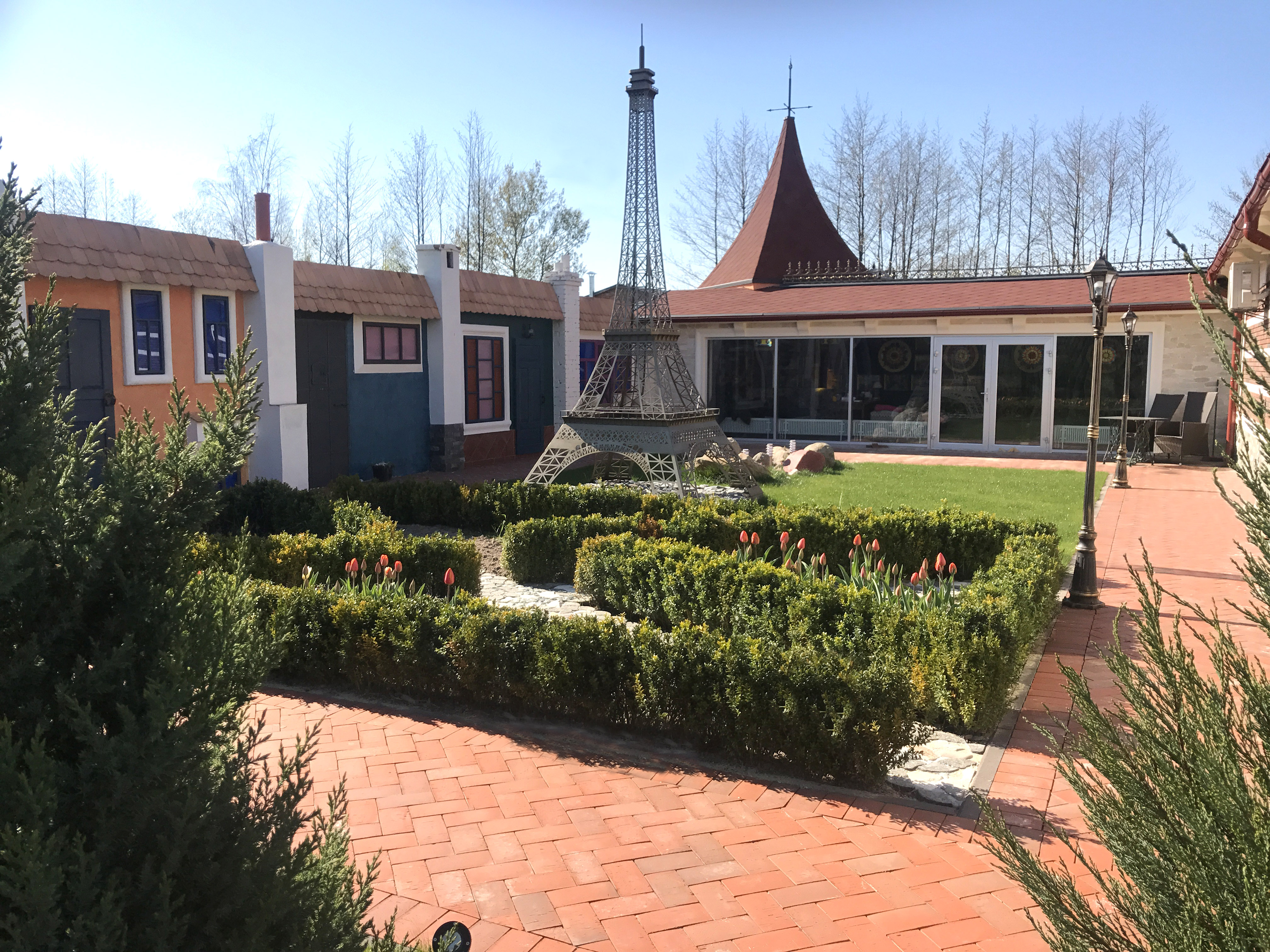

- Location within Zhytomyr Oblast Location within Ukraine
- Coordinates: 50.372239°N 27.989475°E
- Country: Ukraine
- Oblast: Zhytomyr Oblast
- Raion: Zviahel Raion
- Hromada: Dovbysh settlement hromada
- Time zone: UTC+2 (EET)
  - Summer (DST): UTC+3 (EEST)

Dovbysh (Ukrainian: Довбиш; Polish: Dołbysz) is a rural settlement in Zviahel Raion, Zhytomyr Oblast, Ukraine. The settlement was previously known as Markhlevsk (Ukrainian: Мархлевськ; Polish: Marchlewsk) after the Polish-born Soviet politician and civil activist Julian Marchlewski. Population: 4,071 (2022 estimate)

== History ==
In the 1920s Marchlewsk was an administrative center of Marchlewszczyzna, a Polish National Raion of Zhytomyr Okruha. In the mid-1930s the district was disbanded. Later it was incorporated into Kyiv Oblast.

During World War II, Jews of the town were murdered in a mass execution perpetrated by an Einsatzgruppe.

Until 26 January 2024, Dovbush was designated urban-type settlement. On this day, a new law entered into force which abolished this status, and Dovbush became a rural settlement.

== Economy ==
Dovbysh is known for its porcelain factory.

== See also ==
- Polish Autonomous District
