= Marian Kropyvnytskyi =

Ukrainian painter (1903–1989)

Marian Yuliyovych Kropyvnytskyi (born September 8, 1903, in the village of Cherepashyntsi, Russian Empire; died August 16, 1989, in Kyiv, Ukraine) was a Ukrainian artist, painter, and photographer of Polish descent.

== Exhibitions ==
- 1931 - Ukrainian SSR. The third art exhibition of the Kyiv branch of the All-Ukrainian Association of Proletarian Artists.
- 1936 - Moscow. Exhibition of works by a team of Polish-Soviet artists.
- 1937 - Jubilee Exhibition of works by artists of the Ukrainian SSR. (1917—1937)
- 1937 - Prosperous Ukraine
