= Provisional Polish Revolutionary Committee =

Organization in the Polish–Soviet War

Provisional Polish Revolutionary Committee POLREWKOM
- Tymczasowy Komitet Rewolucyjny Polski; T.K.R.P.
- Seal

- Banner of the Committee

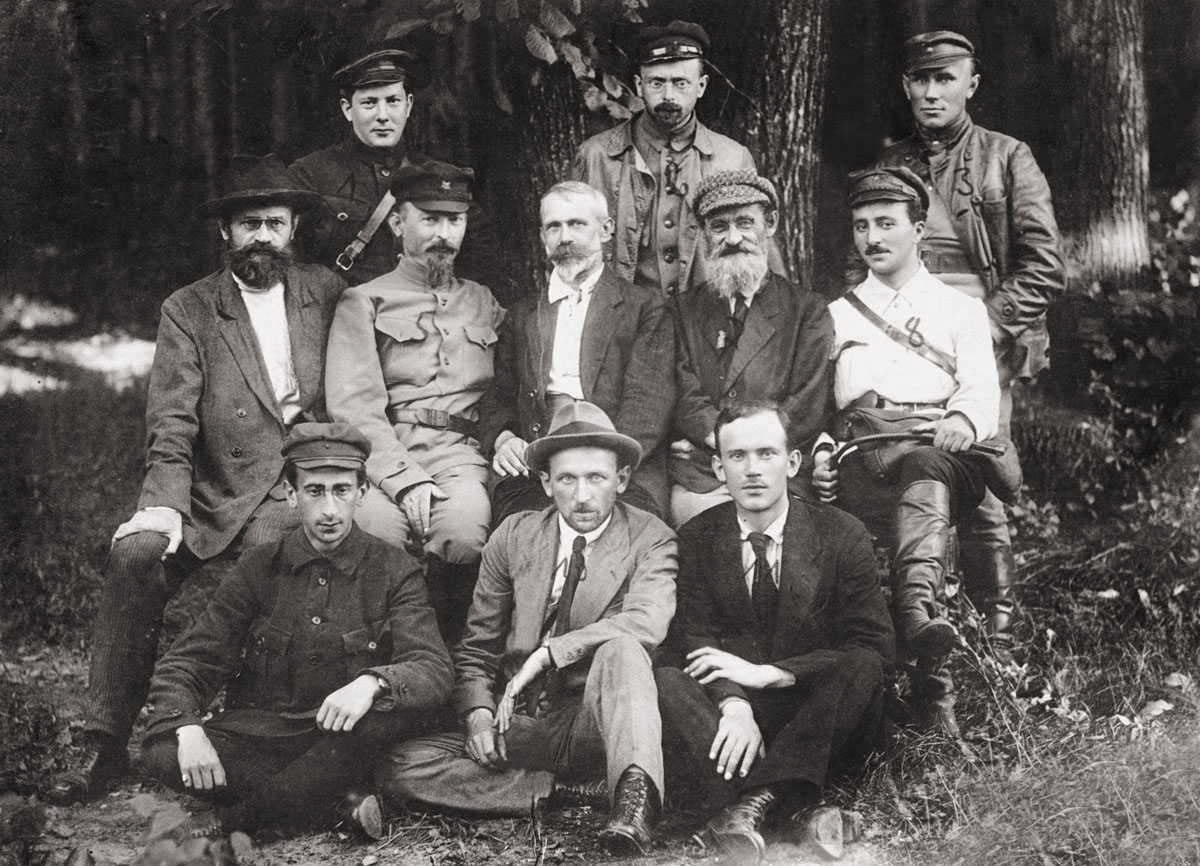
- Polrewkom 1920 (second row, left to right: Ivan Skvortsov-Stepanov, Feliks Dzierżyński, Julian Marchlewski, Feliks Kon. Bottom row, center: Marian Stokowski)

Agency overview
- Formed: 23 July 1920
- Preceding agency: Polish Bureau of Bolsheviks
- Dissolved: 26 August 1920
- Jurisdiction: Poland
- Headquarters: Smolensk (initially) Białystok
- Agency executive: Julian Baltazar Marchlewski, Chairman

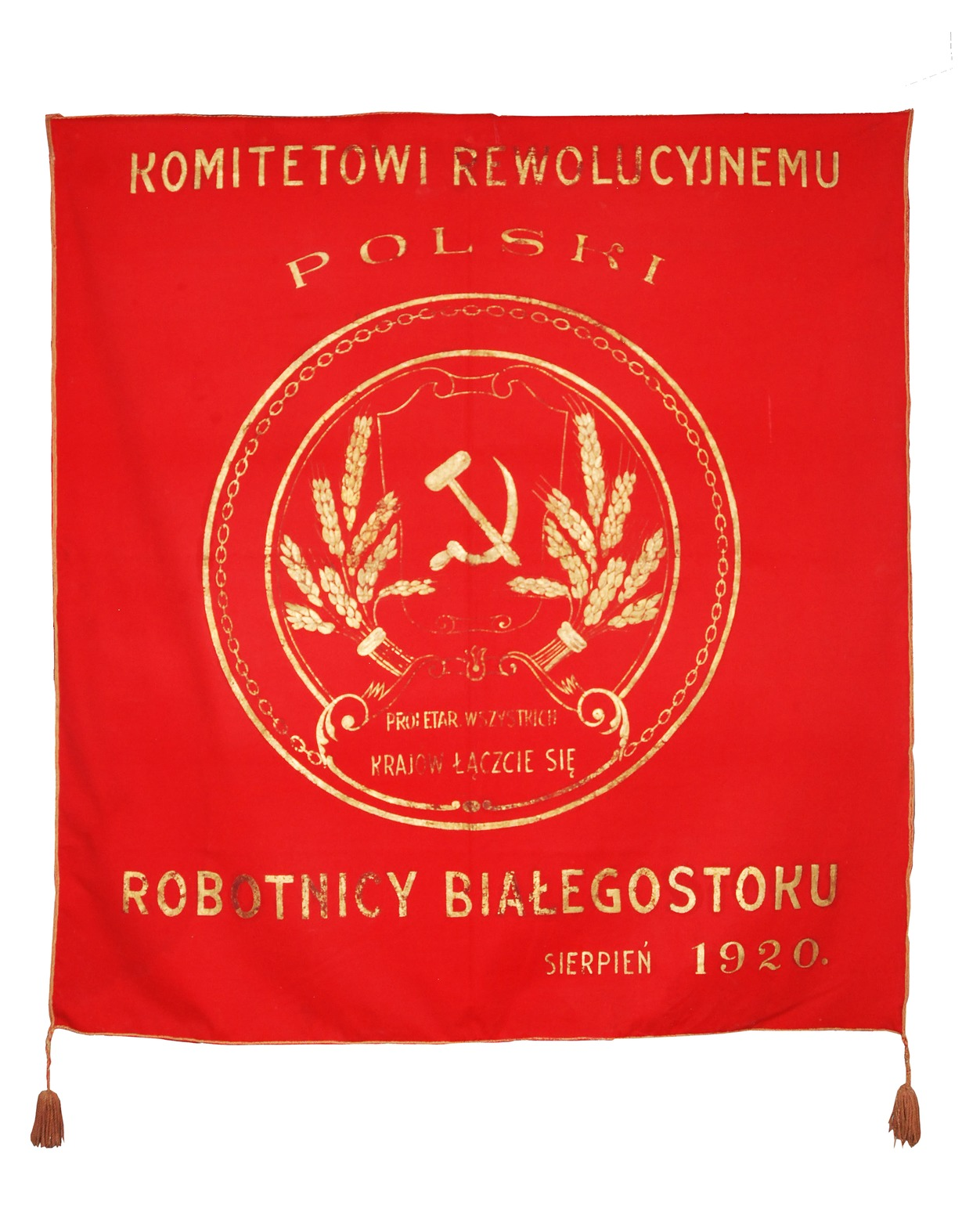
Banner of the Polrewkom donated by the workers of Białystok, August 1920

The Provisional Polish Revolutionary Committee (Polish: Tymczasowy Komitet Rewolucyjny Polski, TKRP, Polrewkom; Russian: Временный революционный комитет Польши, Польревком) was a revolutionary committee established by the Russian Soviet Federative Socialist Republic during the Polish–Soviet War as the intended provisional government for territories occupied by the Red Army, with the purpose of establishing a Soviet republic in Poland.

== History ==
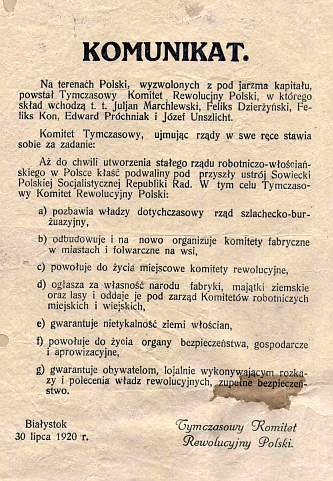
Proclamation of Polrewkom, 30 of July 1920

Manifesto of Polrewkom, 30 of July 1920

The Polish Bureau of the Central Committee of the Bolshevik Party, was created on 23 July 1920, in Moscow by Polish Bolsheviks, with Julian Marchlewski as its chairman. On July 23, in Smolensk, following the transformation of the Polish Bureau, the Polrewkom was established, and staffed by communist activists of Polish descent residing in Soviet Russia. The committee traveled in an armored train behind the advancing Red Army, which quickly proceeded to Minsk (25 July) and Wilno (27 July), before arriving in Białystok on 30 July 1920, where permanent headquarters were established in the Branicki Palace, from where the group issued public proclamations. The actions of the committee and Felix Dzerzhinsky were officially approved by an order of August 14 issued by the Supreme Commander of the Red Army, Sergei Kamenev, and by an order of August 15 issued in Minsk by the commander of the Western Front, Mikhail Tukhachevsky, and by Iosif Unshlikht.

The committee was to assume administrative and political power in the occupied Polish territories and constitute an intermediate stage before the formation of a new revolutionary government in occupied Warsaw, composed of local communists from the Communist Party of Poland. On August 1, 1920, in Białystok, the Polrewkom issued a manifesto announcing the creation of a Polish Socialist Soviet Republic, with several representatives moving to Wyszków to prepare to take power after the Red Army occupied Warsaw. The group is considered to have been a Bolshevik puppet government, acting as an overt emanation of the Soviet Politburo of the Central Committee.

The Polrewkom activity was related to the North-Western Front of the Red Army. The South-Western front of the Red Army supported a similar Galician Revolutionary Committee (Galrewkom), seated in Tarnopol in Eastern Galicia.

The TKRP was met with relative enthusiasm in Białystok which had about 75% Jewish and working class majority. However, as the Red Army moved on towards Warsaw, it and Polrewkom had little support from the Polish population.

As a result of the Battle of Warsaw, the committee was forced to retreat east and evacuate from Białystok along with the retreating Red Army on 22 August, arriving in Minsk on August 26. It soon ceased its activities, and its members were assigned to front-line headquarters or prisoner-of-war camps in an attempt to recruit volunteers for the Polish Red Army. Following the dissolution of the committee, some Polish communists illegally returned to Poland, while a significant number of them remained in the Soviet Union, becoming instrumental in the creation of the Polish Autonomous District.

== Organization ==
The committee consisted of the following members:

- Julian Baltazar Marchlewski (Chairman)
- Feliks Dzierżyński (de facto leader)
- Feliks Kon (Education)
- Edward Próchniak (Secretary)
- Józef Unszlicht (Party)
- Bernard Zaks (Industry)
- Stanisław Bobiński (Agriculture)
- Tadeusz Radwański (Propaganda)

The representative of the Central Committee of the Russian Communist Party (Bolsheviks) to the Polrevkom was Commissar Ivan Skvortsov-Stepanov. Other associates included Alexander Fornalski, Marceli Nowotko, and Józef Lewartowski.
