= National districts of the Russian Federation =

Administrative divisions for national minorities in USSR and Russia

National districts (Russian: Национальные районы) are special districts made for national minorities in Russia.

== List ==
- Bauntovsky District, Buryatia
- Pryazhinsky District, Republic of Karelia
- Kalevalsky District, Republic of Karelia
- Olonetsky District, Republic of Karelia
- Anabarsky District, Sakha Republic
- Zhigansky District, Sakha Republic
- Momsky District, Sakha Republic
- Olenyoksky District, Sakha Republic
- Eveno-Bytantaysky National District, Sakha Republic
- Nemetsky National District, Altai Krai
- Azovsky Nemetsky National District, Omsk Oblast

== Districts with "titular" nationality ==
- Agulsky District, Republic of Dagestan
- Laksky District, Republic of Dagestan
- Novolaksky District, Republic of Dagestan
- Nogaysky District, Republic of Dagestan
- Rutulsky District, Republic of Dagestan
- Tabasaransky District, Republic of Dagestan
- Akhvakhsky District, Republic of Dagestan
- Botlikhsky District, Republic of Dagestan
- Abazinsky District, Karachay-Cherkess Republic
- Nogaysky District, Karachay-Cherkess Republic
- Karachayevsky District, Karachay-Cherkess Republic
- Malokarachayevsky District, Karachay-Cherkess Republic
- Gornomariysky District, Mari El Republic
- Aleutsky District, Kamchatka Krai
- Olyutorsky District, Kamchatka Krai
- Nanaysky District, Khabarovsk Krai
- Ulchsky District, Khabarovsk Krai
- Severo-Evensky District, Magadan Oblast
- Krasnoselkupsky District, Yamalo-Nenets Autonomous Okrug
- Nagaybaksky District, Chelyabinsk Oblast
- Evenkiysky District, Krasnoyarsk Krai
- Taymyrsky Dolgano-Nenetsky District, Krasnoyarsk Krai
- Izhemsky District, Komi Republic
- Todzhinsky District, Tuva Republic
- Turkmensky District, Stavropol Krai
