= Lugovoy, Jambyl Region =

Lugovoy Луговое
- Village
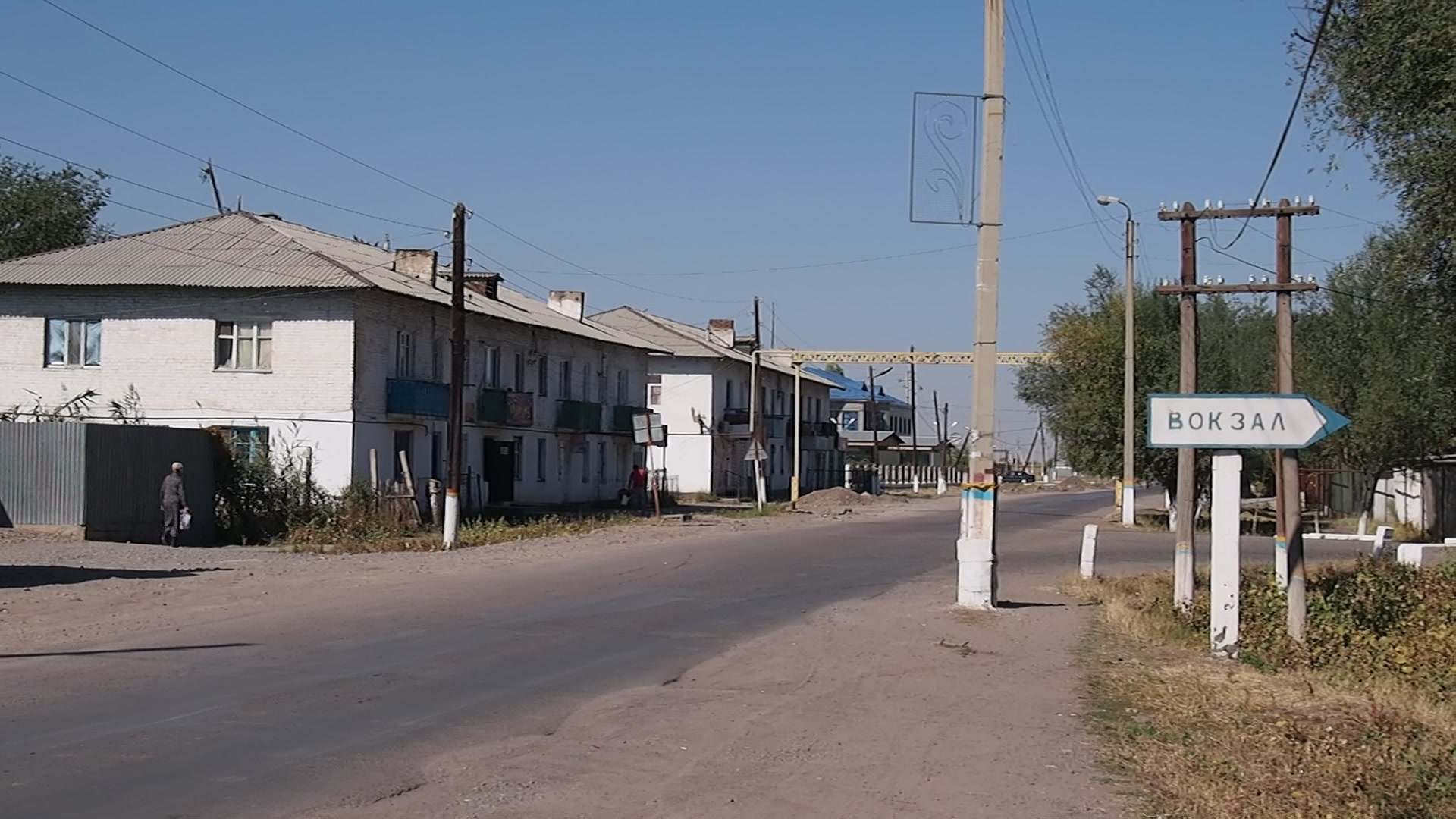
- Interactive map of Lugovoy
- Location within Kazakhstan
- Coordinates: 42°56′50″N 72°45′52″E
- Country: Kazakhstan
- Regions of Kazakhstan: Jambyl Region
- Districts of Kazakhstan: Turar Ryskulov District

Population (2009)
  - Total: 10,242

Lugovoy (Kazakh: Луговое) is a village in the Turar Ryskulov District, Jambyl Region, Kazakhstan.

== Demographics ==
According to the 2009 Kazakhstani Census, the village has a population of 10,242 (5,103 men and 5,139 women).

As of 1999, the village had 9,876 people (4,874 men and 5,002 women).
