= Polish National District =

Polish national autonomy in early Soviet Union

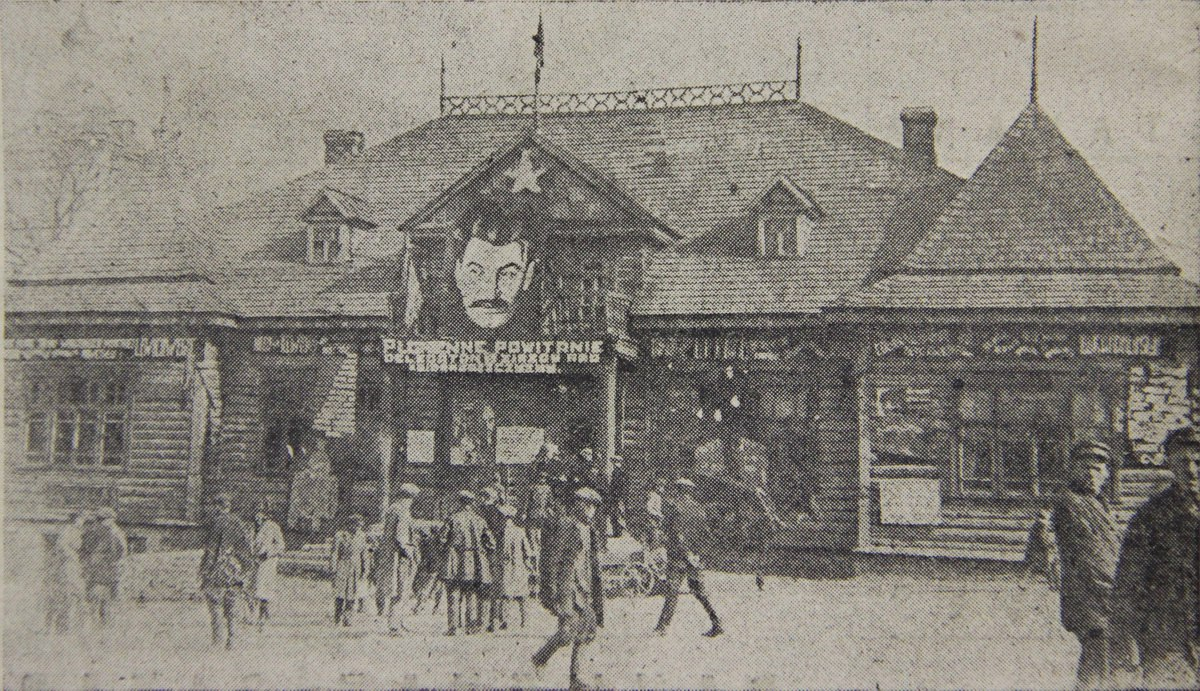
The People's House in Kojdanów, capital of the Dzierżyńszczyzna, in 1932

Polish National Districts (called in Russian "полрайоны", polrajony, an abbreviation for "польские национальные районы", "Polish national raions") were national districts of the Soviet Union in the interbellum period providing national autonomy for Polish minorities in the Ukrainian and Byelorussian Soviet Socialist Republics of the USSR. They were created in an attempt to live up to the postulate of Leninism about the rights of nations for self-determination. Also, creation of these regions served one of purposes of the Bolsheviks to export the revolution since after their defeat in the Polish-Soviet War, the Soviets did not give up their idea of creating a Soviet Republic in Poland. Polish National Districts were supposed to be the origin of future Soviet Poland. They both were disbanded in mid-1930s and a significant part of their populations ("anti-Soviet and unreliable elements") was deported to Kazakhstan during the Great Purge.

== Origins ==
The possibility of granting autonomy to Polish-populated areas of the Soviet Union was discussed during the Polish-Soviet war by key persons involved in the Provisional Polish Revolutionary Committee. However, there were no plans to create whole districts; autonomy would be granted to separate villages. In 1925 it was decided that a district would be created in Soviet Ukraine, where, according to the 1926 survey, 476,435 Poles lived. This was 1.6% of the Ukrainian population, but in the Zhitomir Oblast, their number reached 10%. Among persons who supported the district were Soviet communists of Polish origin, such as Feliks Kon, Julian Marchlewski, Felix Dzerzhinsky and Tomasz Dąbal. Thus Marchlewszczyzna was created, and later Dzierżyńszczyzna.

== Marchlewszczyzna ==
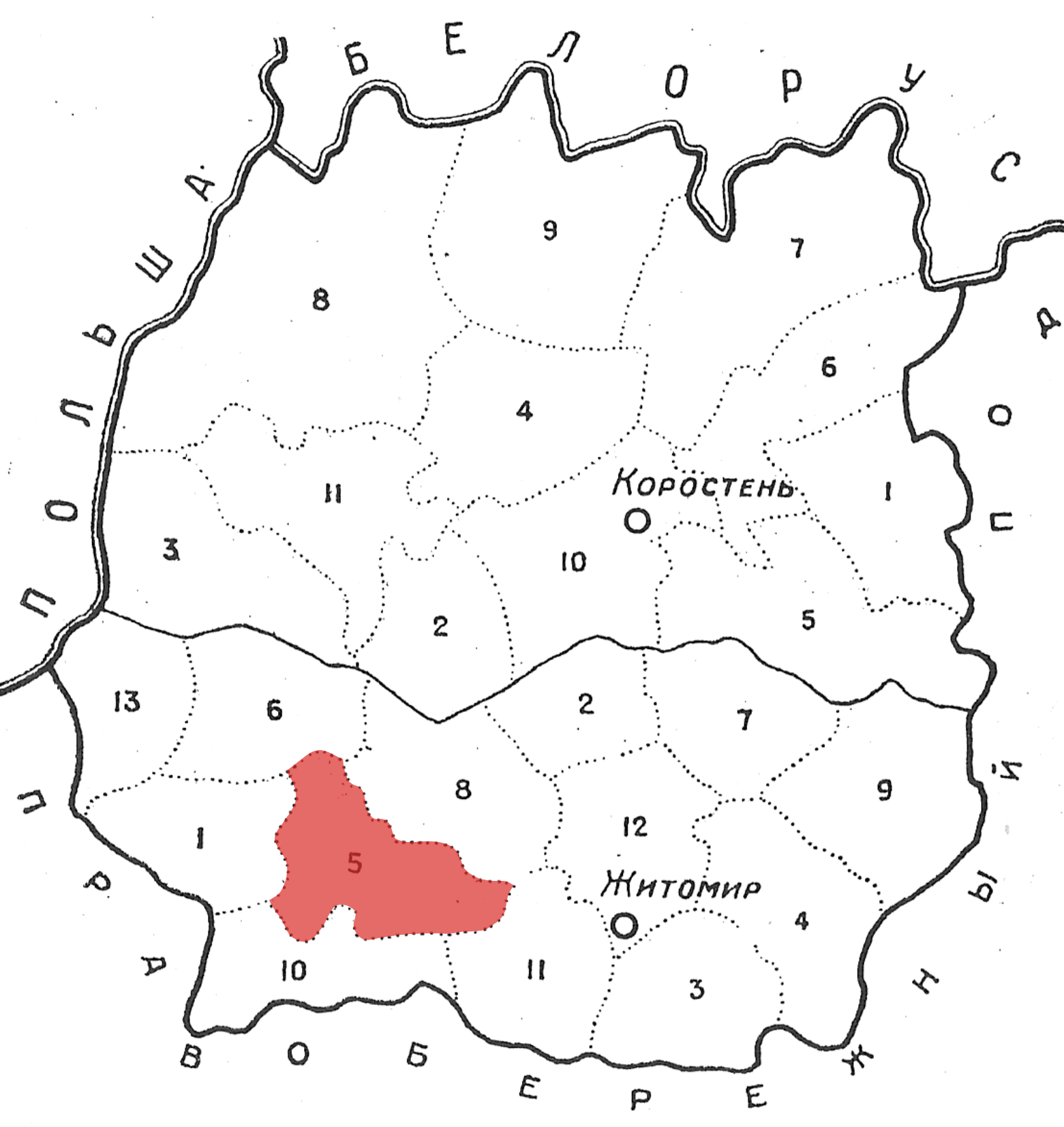
Marchlewszczyzna on the map of western part of Polissia Sub-Raion in 1926

Marchlewszczyzna was a Polish National District of the Ukrainian Soviet Socialist Republic created as an experiment and as part of the Soviet Korenizatsia campaign on 21 July 1925 in Zhytomyr Okruha to the west of Zhytomyr on resolution of Little Presidium of the All-Ukrainian Central Executive Committee. Its capital the town of Dovbysh, later in 1926, was renamed as Marchlewsk.

== Dzierżyńszczyzna ==
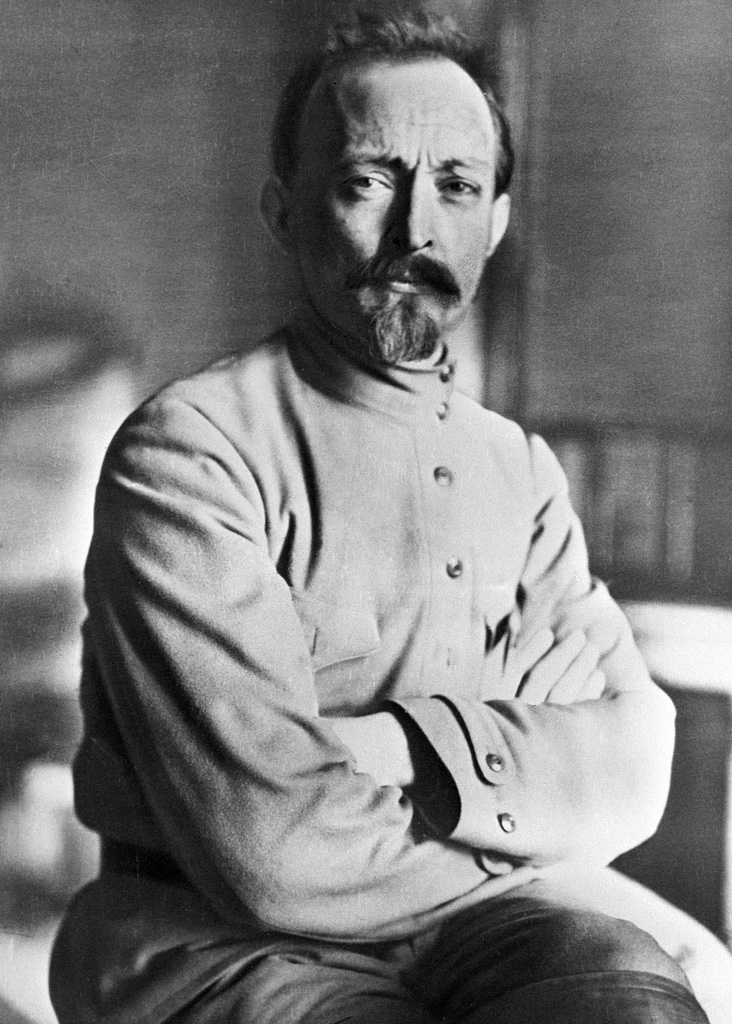
Felix Dzerzhinsky

Dzierżyńszczyzna was a Polish National District (Дзержинский польский национальный район, Dzierzhynsky Polish national district) in Belarus, near Minsk and close to the Soviet-Polish border of the time. It was created on March 15, 1932, with its capital at Dzierżyńsk (formerly known as Kojdanava Polish: Kojdanów, so that initially it was established as "Kojdanovsky Polish national district"). It was named after the Cheka director Felix Dzerzhinsky.

Similarly to Marchlewszczyzna, limited Polish autonomy in the area was a real fact, with Polish-language schools, libraries and institutions. At the same time, the inhabitants were subject to intensive communist propaganda. Religious life was suppressed, and the campaign of collectivization, carried out in mid-1930s, met resistance of local Polish peasants. Unlike Marchlewszczyzna, which was the real center of Polish cultural life in the Soviet Union, Dzierżyńszczyzna's influence was limited.

== Disbanding ==
Polish districts were among those which resisted Soviet collectivization and atheization. For political reasons, drastic measures were initially not applied in these areas. Eventually, Marchlewszczyzna was disbanded in 1935 at the onset of the Great Purge and most of the administration was executed. In the following years a significant part of population was deported to Kazakhstan and other remote areas of the Soviet Union.

Dzierżyńszczyzna was disbanded in 1937.

All Polish schools and libraries were closed, Tomasz Dąbal was executed in 1938.

After World War II, in both Polish and Soviet historiographies, the existence of the districts was omitted, perhaps because the authorities of both countries wanted to avoid uneasy questions about sudden rejection of the Leninist postulate of the rights of nations for self-determination.

The area of Marchlewszczyzna is still inhabited by the Polish minority, in the town of Dovbysh they make half of the population. There are also Poles in Dzierżyńszczyzna.

== See also ==
- Polish operation of the NKVD
- Population transfer in the Soviet Union
