= 4th World Congress of the Communist International =

- Begins: November 5, 1922
- Ends: December 5, 1922
- Location: Moscow
- Country: Russian Soviet Federative Socialist Republic
- Previous event: 3rd Congress
- Next event: 5th World Congress

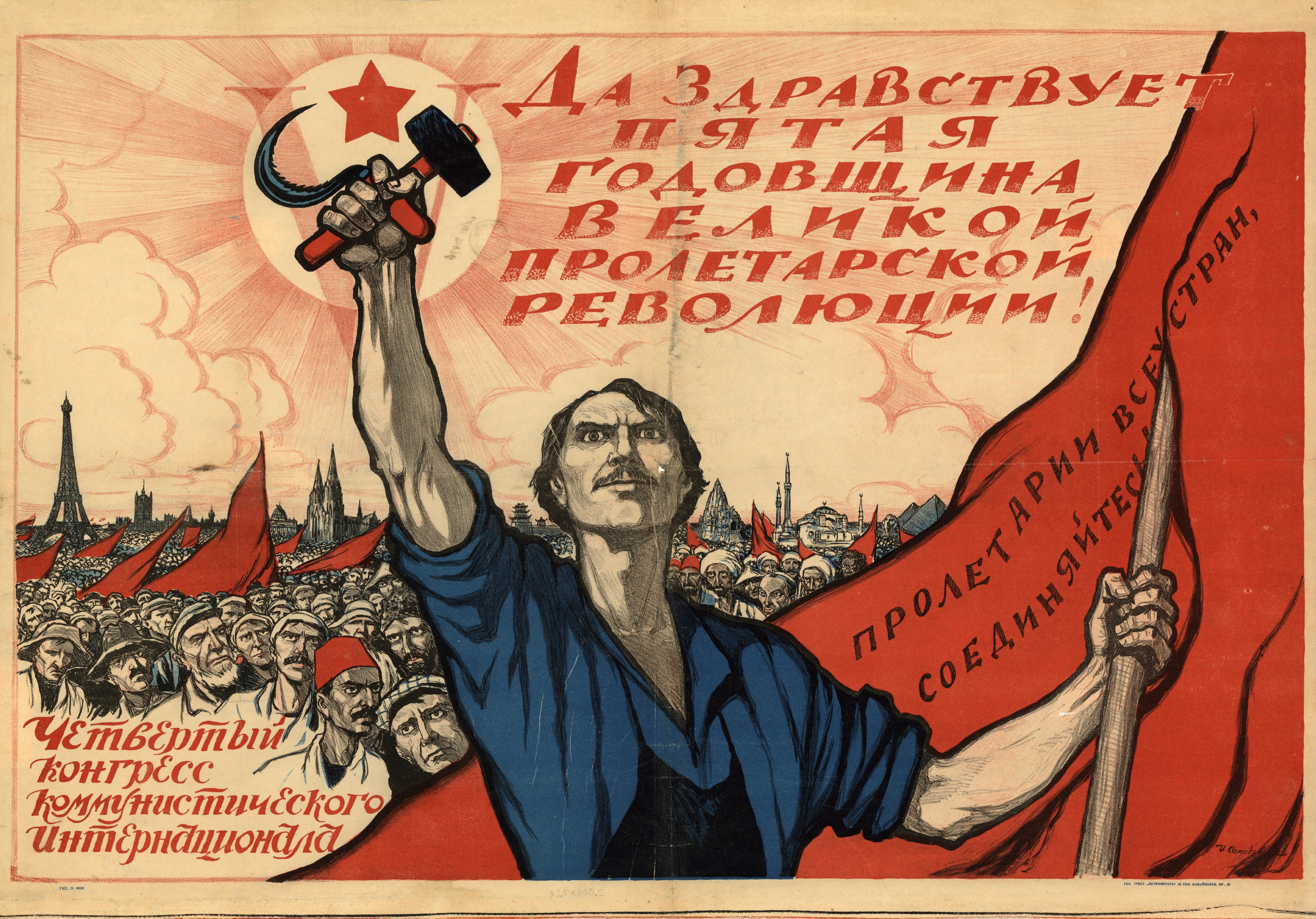
Poster dedicated to the 5th anniversary of the Russian Revolution and the 4th congress of the Comintern

The 4th World Congress of the Communist International was an assembly of delegates to the Communist International held in Petrograd and Moscow, Soviet Russia, between November 5 and December 5, 1922. A total of 343 voting delegates from 58 countries were in attendance. The 4th World Congress is best remembered for having amplified the tactic of the United Front into a fundamental part of international Communist policy. The gathering also elected a new set of leaders to the Comintern's governing body, the Executive Committee of the Communist International (ECCI).

== History ==
=== Historical background ===
The 4th World Congress of the Comintern was convened on November 5, 1922 — just days after Benito Mussolini's March on Rome that effectively seized power for his National Fascist Party. The revolutionary upsurge which had swept Europe during the years immediately following the termination of World War I was clearly in full retreat and the international Communist movement saw itself in need for accommodation to this changed political environment.

With the prospects for immediate revolution in the industrialized countries of Western Europe fading, the defense of the regime in Soviet Russia had rapidly come to be seen as the chief priority of the Communist movement. It has been speculated by Hessel that lack of comintern aligned in Finland, Germany, Hungary, and elsewhere, the stature of the Communist Party of Russia was enhanced relative to other Communist Parties of the world, and tendencies towards centralization and Russian dominance were thereby accelerated..

=== Convocation ===
The 4th World Congress was attended by 343 voting delegates from 58 different countries. An additional 65 delegates were present with the right to speak but not to vote, and another 6 were admitted as guests. The gathering was the last congress of the Comintern attended by Soviet leader V.I. Lenin, who was too ill to attend any regular sessions and only appeared to deliver a single speech.

The Congress opened at 9 pm in the People's House in Petrograd, called to order by Clara Zetkin of Germany, who noted the fifth anniversary of the October Revolution of 1917. An honorary 13 member Presidium of the Congress — chosen in advance by ECCI in consultation with important national parties — was unanimously elected as the first order of business.

=== Factional turmoil ===
The World Congress, as the highest decision-making authority of the Communist International, was marked by the bitter factional battles of various member parties, with each group seeking final decision in favor of its policies and positions. Chief among these was the battle among the delegates of the Communist Party of America, split into two hostile factional groups. The battle spilled into the nominations for the American seat on the governing Executive Committee of the Communist International, with American Otto Huiswoud protesting the nomination of C.E. Ruthenberg for this position, arguing that he had himself been selected for the spot by the American delegation. Huiswoud's protest was to no avail as the new Executive was proposed as a single slate of pre-determined names, all amendments were rejected, and the list of candidates was approved en bloc.

=== Policy of the United Front ===
Paying considerable attention to the growth of the fascist danger (in connection with the establishment of the fascist dictatorship in Italy), the Congress emphasized that the main means of combating fascism was the tactics of the united workers' front. To rally the broad masses of working people, who were not yet ready to fight for the dictatorship of the proletariat, but were already capable of fighting for economic and political rights against the bourgeoisie, the slogan of a “workers' government” was put forward (later the slogan of a workers' and peasants' government). While the tactic of the United Front was first adopted by ECCI in December 1921, the 4th World Congress is remembered to history for having extended and further institutionalized the tactic.

== Presidium of the 4th World Congress ==
Members of the presidium were:

- Émile Béron (France)
- Arthur Henriet (France)
- Sen Katayama (Japan)
- Ludwig Katterfeld (USA)
- Vasil Kolarov (Bulgaria)
- Jack V. Leckie (Great Britain)
- V.I. Lenin (Soviet Russia)
- Andrea Marabini (Italy)
- Alois Neurath (Czechoslovakia)
- Olav Scheflo (Norway)
- Leon Trotsky (Soviet Russia)
- Adolf Warszawski (Poland)
- Clara Zetkin (Germany)

== Speakers at the 4th World Congress ==
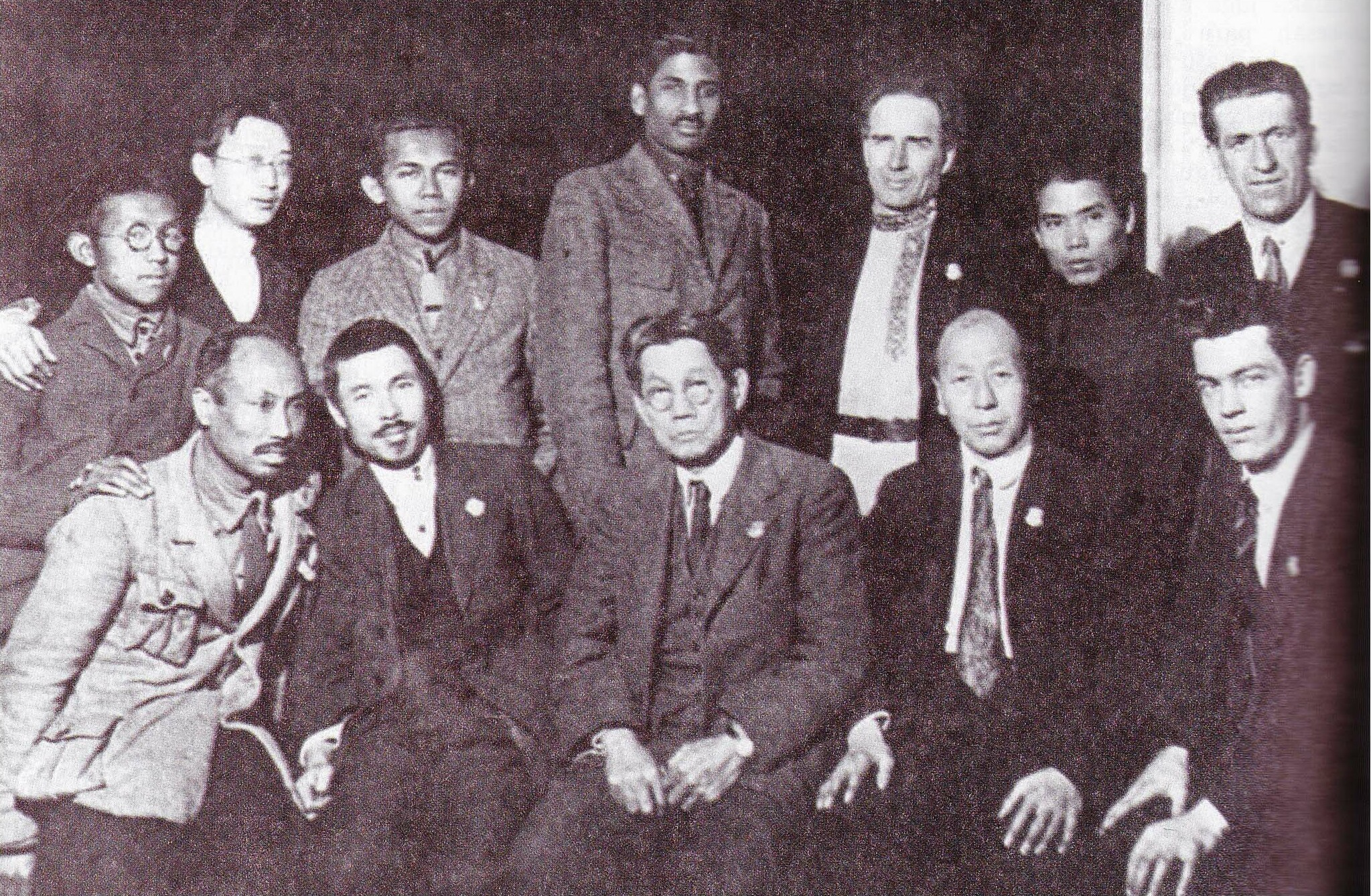
Group picture of Eastern Delegation during the 4th Congress. Backrow-left; Liu Renjing, Qu Qiubai, Tan Malaka, M. N. Roy, William Earsman, unknown, and Jock Garden. Front-row; Chen Duxiu (left), Sen Katayama (Middle) and Thomas (Tom) Payne (Right)

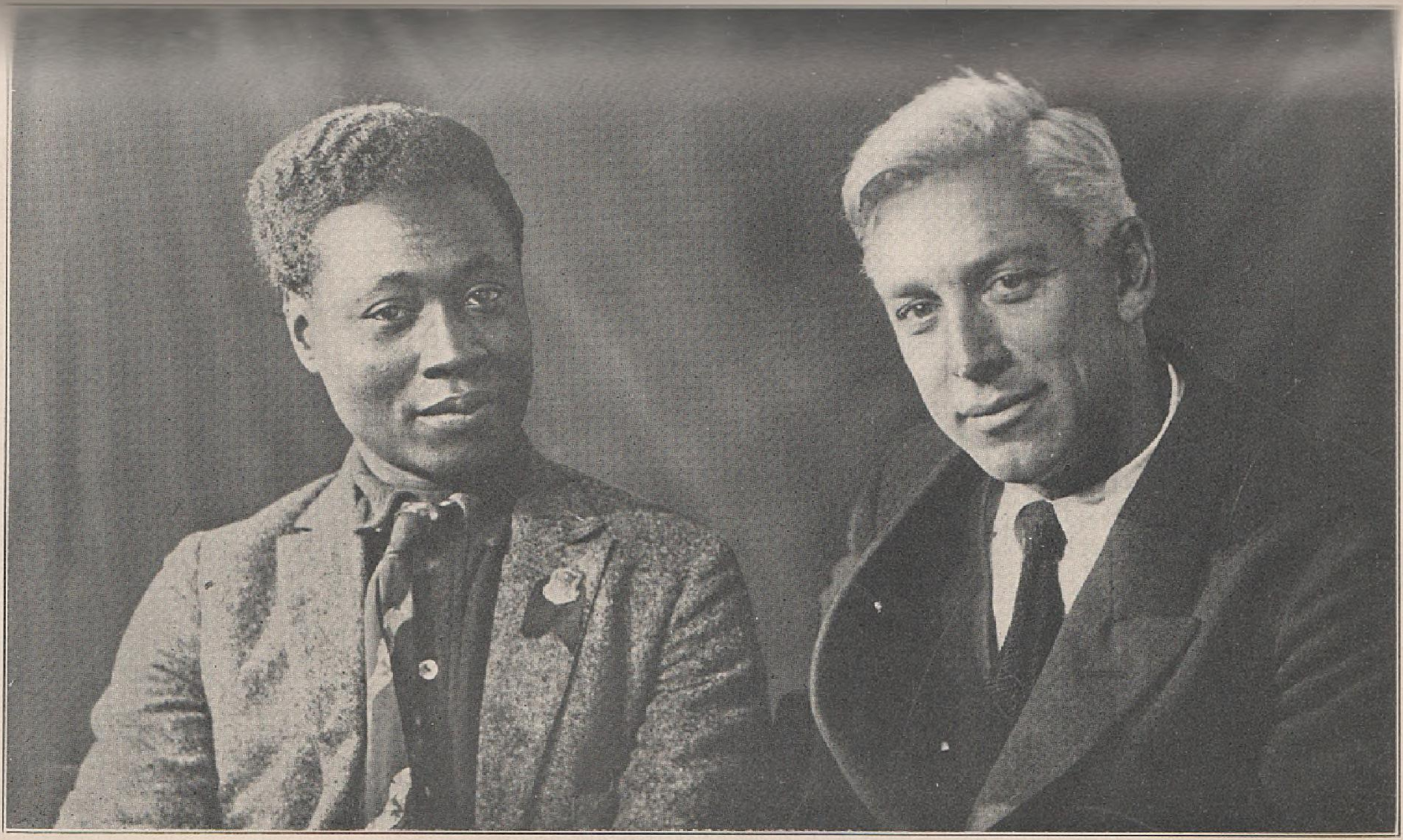
American delegates Claude McKay and Max Eastman.

Speakers at the 4th World Congress
Name	Country	Sessions	Notes
Isidoro Acevedo	Spain	6	
Sadrettin Celal Antel	Turkey	17, 20	Used pseudonym "Orhan." Trade Unions; Eastern Question.
Izidoro Azzario	Italy	1	
Karl Becker	Germany	4	
Max Bedacht	USA	7	
Émile Béron	France	1, 18, 19, 26	
Amadeo Bordiga	Italy	3, 4, 12, 18, 27, 30, 32	Report of ECCI; Italy.
Tahar Boudengha	Tunisia	19	Eastern Question.
Nikolai Bukharin	Soviet Russia	5, 6, 14, 18, 31	Program; Norway.
Sidney Bunting	South Africa	20	Eastern Question.
Marcel Cachin	France	17, 25, 29	Trade Unions; France.
Antonio Canellas	Brazil	29	France.
John S. Clarke	Great Britain	16	Trade Unions.
Roderic Connolly	Ireland	26, 32	
Henryk Domski	Poland	6, 7	
Pierre Dormoy	France	7	
Jean Duret	France	4, 7	
William Earsman	Australia	20	Eastern Question.
Hugo Eberlein	Germany	13, 26, 29	
Alfred S. Edwards	USA	7	Used the pseudonym "Sullivan."
Ferdinand Faure	France	5	
Franciszek Fiedler	Poland	26	Used pseudonym "Keller."
Ruth Fischer	Germany	3	
Paul Friedländer	Austria	7, 26	
Jock Garden	Australia	17	Trade Unions.
Egidio Gennari	Italy	25	
Antonio Graziadei	Italy	4, 7, 30	Italy.
Anna Grün	Austria	27, 32	
Otto Huiswoud	USA	22, 32	Used the pseudonym "Billings." Negro Question.
Fritz Heckert	Germany	17	Trade Unions.
Arthur Henriet	France	23	Cooperative Movement.
Edwin Hoernle	Germany	13, 25, 32	Education.
Jules Humbert-Droz	Switzerland	2, 5, 13, 29	Report of ECCI; France.
Mahmud Husni el-Arabi	Egypt	20	Eastern Question.
Renaud Jean	France	29	France.
Jack Johnstone	USA	12	Used the pseudonym "Pullman."
William Joss	Great Britain	21	Agrarian Question.
Khristo Kabakchiev	Bulgaria	15	Program.
Varsenika Kasparova	Soviet Russia	24	Women's Movement
Sen Katayama	Japan	1, 6, 19, 22, 27	Eastern Question; Agrarian Question.
Ludwig Katterfeld	USA	5	Used pseudonym "Carr."
L.M. Khinchuk	Soviet Russia	23	Cooperative Movement.
Vasil Kolarov	Bulgaria	1, 6, 19, 27, 32	Eastern Question.
Feliks Kon	Poland	1, 27, 31	
Maria Koszutska	Poland	22	Agrarian Question. Used the pseudonym "Wera Kostrzewa"
Nadezhda Krupskaya	Soviet Russia	25	Education.
Joseph E. Kucher	USA	17	Trade Unions.
Béla Kun	Hungary	9	Five Years of the Russian Revolution commemoration.
Otto Kuusinen	Finland	29	France.
Jenö Landler	Hungary	6	
Henri Lauridan	France	17, 23	Trade Unions; Cooperative Movement.
V.I. Lenin	Soviet Russia	8	Five Years of the Russian Revolution commemoration.
Liu Renjing	China	20	Eastern Question.
A. Lozovsky	Soviet Russia	16, 18	Trade Unions.
Julian Marchlewski	Poland	27	
Claude McKay	USA	22	Negro Question.
V.N. Meshcheriakov	Soviet Russia	23	Cooperative Movement.
Ernst Meyer	Germany	3, 7	
Haakon Meyer	Norway	5, 32	
J.T. Murphy	Great Britain	5, 24, 26	Women's Movement; Versailles Treaty.
Willi Münzenberg	Germany	18, 31	International Workers' Aid.
Alois Neurath	Czechoslovakia	3	
Karim Nikbin	Iran	20	Eastern Question.
Kosta Novakovic	Yugoslavia	31	Used the pseudonym "Stanic." Yugoslavia.
Ana Pauker	Romania	21	Eastern Question.
Jan Pavlik	Czechoslovakia	17	Trade Unions.
Gabriel Péri	France	7	
Karl Radek	Soviet Russia	3, 4, 6, 11, 13, 18, 20, 30	
Ljubomir Radovanovic	Yugoslavia	13, 25, 31	Used the pseudonym "Radic." Versailles Treaty; Yugoslavia.
Mátyás Rákosi	Hungary	6	
Daniel Renoult	France	29	France
Roger Rieu	France	21	Agrarian Question.
Alfred Rosmer	France	6, 13, 17	Trade Unions.
M.N. Roy	India	19	Eastern Question.
G.I. Safarov	Soviet Russia	20	Eastern Question.
Richard Schüller	Austria	22, 29	Youth; France.
Mauro Scoccimarro	Italy	7	
Armin Seiden	Czechoslovakia	6	
Giacinto Serrati	Italy	30	Italy.
Bohumír Šmeral	Czechoslovakia	12, 25, 30	Czechoslovakia.
Sofia Smidovich	Soviet Russia	24	Women's Movement.
Boris Souvarine	France	7, 29	France; Czechoslovakia.
Rose Pastor Stokes	USA	27	Used the pseudonym "Sasha."
Ciril Štukelj	Slovenia	31	Used the pseudonym "Marynko."
Václav Šturc	Czechoslovakia	30	Czechoslovakia.
Hertha Sturm	Germany	17, 34	Trade Unions; Women's Movement.
Arne Swabeck	USA	17	Trade Unions.
Ibrahim Datoek Tan Malaka	Dutch East Indies	7	Anticolonial Collaboration of Communism and Pan-Islamism
Angelo Tasca	Italy	17	Trade Unions.
Ivan Teodorovich	Soviet Russia	21	Agrarian Question.
August Thalheimer	Germany	14	Program.
Oscar Torp	Norway	32	
Leon Trotsky	Soviet Russia	10, 28, 29	Five Years of the Russian Revolution commemoration; France.
Hugo Urbahns	Germany	12	
Emanuel Vajtauer	Czechoslovakia	3	
Eugen Varga	Hungary	3, 21, 22, 27	Agrarian Question.
Eduard van Overstraeten	Belgium	19	Eastern Question.
Willem van Ravesteyn	Netherlands	6, 13, 19	Eastern Question.
Julius Vercik	Czechoslovakia	17	Trade Unions.
Voja Vujovic	France	7	
Adolf Warszawski	Poland	5	Used the pseudonym "Michalkowski."
Harry Webb	Great Britain	13, 20	Eastern Question.
Franz Welti	Switzerland	13	
Clara Zetkin	Germany	1, 8, 9, 13, 24, 32	Keynote opening speech; 5 years of the Russian Revolution; Women's Movement
Grigory Zinoviev	Soviet Russia	1, 2, 3, 7, 13, 18, 30, 32	President of the Comintern.

== See also ==
- Communism and Pan-Islamism ‒ Speech by Tan Malaka during the 4th World Congress.
