= Communism and Pan-Islamism =

1922 speech by Tan Malaka

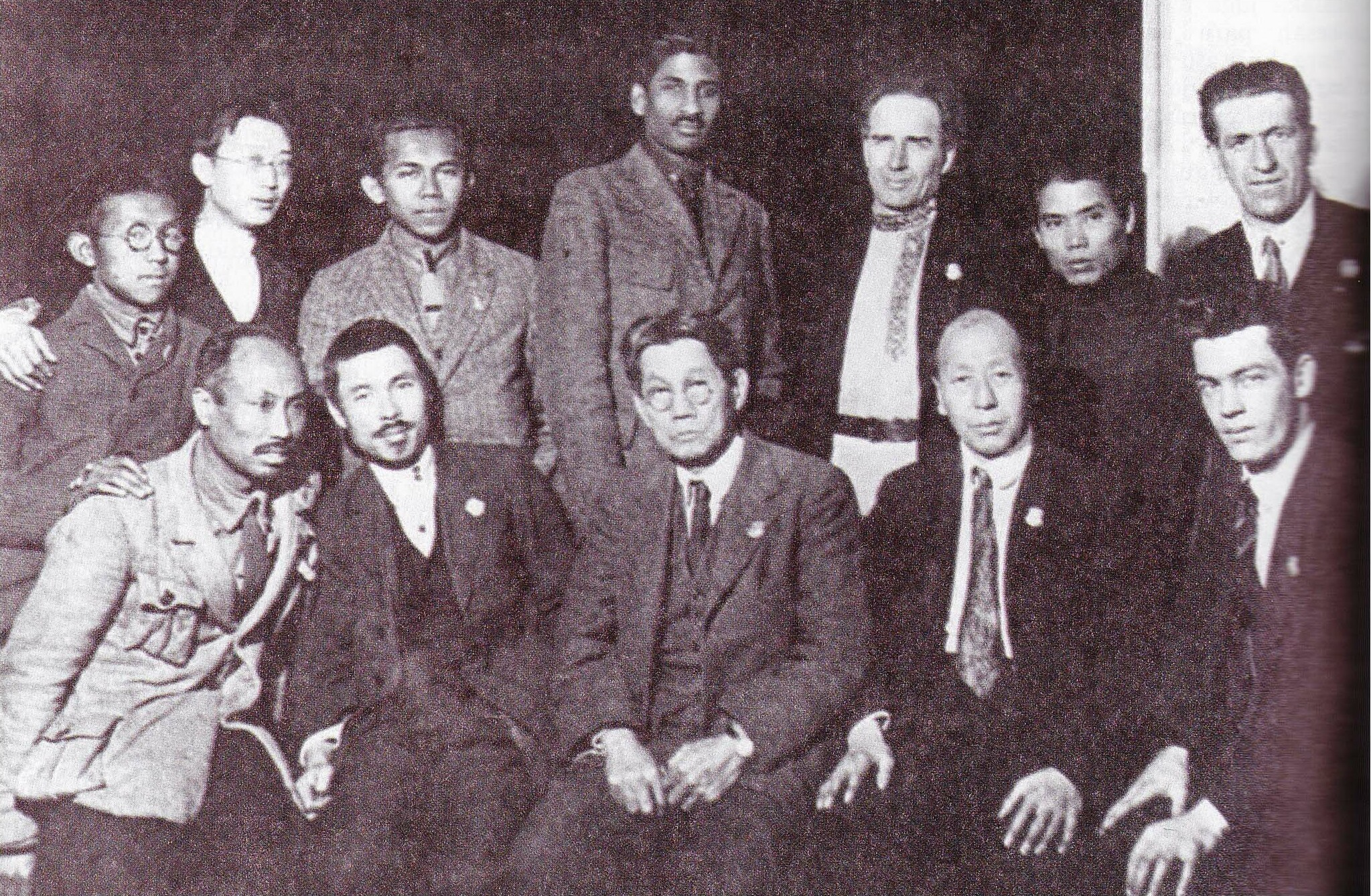
Group picture of Eastern Bolsheviks during the 4th Congress. Backrow-left; Liu Renjing, Qu Qiubai, Tan Malaka, M. N. Roy, unknown, unknown, and Grigory Zinoviev. Front-row; Chen Duxiu (left) and Sen Katayama (Middle)

"Communism and Pan-Islamism" (Indonesian: Komunisme dan Pan-Islamisme), is a speech delivered by Indonesian socialist revolutionary Tan Malaka on 12 November 1922 at the Fourth Congress of the Communist International. In the speech, Tan Malaka asked whether communist parties should support anti-colonial economic boycotts and Pan-Islamist movements. He argued that, among colonised Muslim populations, Pan-Islamism could express a struggle against European imperialism. Communists should therefore distinguish anti-colonial Muslim movements from religious movements that defended landlords, monarchies, and/or other established elites.

Tan Malaka attended the Fourth Congress in 1922 as a representative of the communist movement in the Dutch East Indies. His speech formed part of the congress's discussion of the "united front" concept, a strategy under which communist parties sought temporary cooperation with other political organisations. Though his speech in particular was addressed towards senior leaders Grigory Zinoviev and Karl Radek.

== Background ==
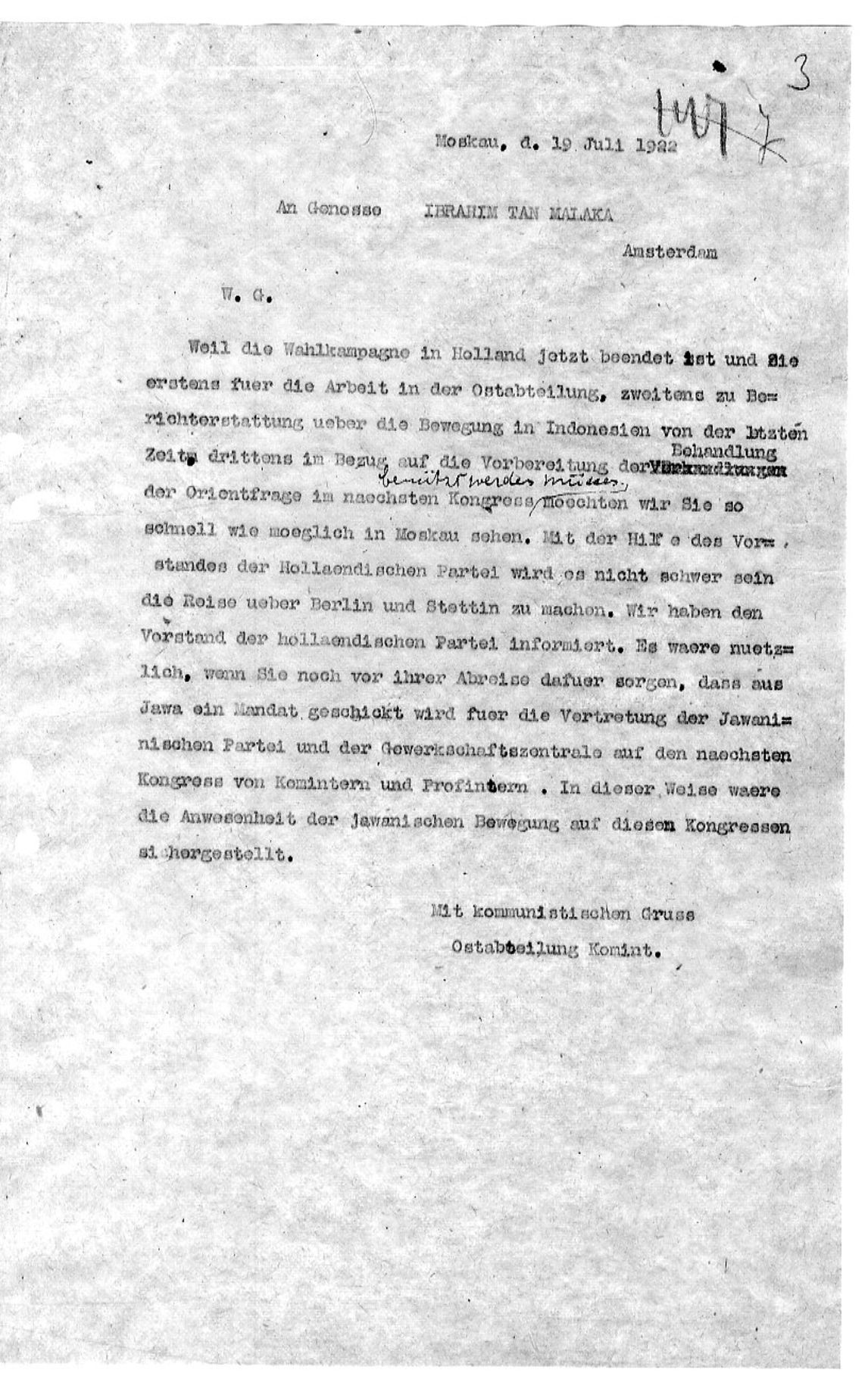
Comintern Eastern Department letter to Tan Malaka, inviting him to Moscow following his participation in the 1922 Dutch general election, 19 July 1922.

The Communist Party of Indonesia, then also known as the Communist Party of the Indies or the Communist Party of Java, had worked within Sarekat Islam, an Islamic mass organisation with a large following among workers, traders and peasants. Communist organisers such as Semaun and Tan Malaka held positions in both movements. The cooperation weakened after Sarekat Islam introduced party discipline that restricted members from belonging to other political parties.

The Second Congress of the Communist International in 1920 had called for a struggle against Pan-Islamism and similar movements when they joined opposition to European imperialism with support for monarchies, religious authorities or local ruling classes. At the Second Congress, Grigory Zinoviev also repeatedly calls for the rejection of "Pan-Islamism" at its closing. This position had caused difficulties for Indonesian communists, since their political constituency was largely Muslim. According to Oliver Crawford, Indonesian communists generally presented communism as a social science separate from theology and also used Islamic language and terms to explain opposition to capitalism and economic exploitation. For the conditions in indonesia at the time, Communism, Islamic activism, labour organisation and nationalism had not yet developed into entirely separate political currents. Henk Sneevliet, Dutch communist and founder of the Indies Social Democratic Association, and his Communist Party of Holland presented an appeal to the congress to understand the Indonesian's struggle against Dutch capitalism, which included the united front of the Sarekat Islam. It is unknown, however, if the appeal was read to the congress. And so, it was feared that Dutch government agents would misuse this resolution against the Sarekat Islam.

In October 1922, after traveling 40 days, Tan Malaka arrived in Moscow, where he spent the following year participating in Comintern activities. He took part in preparations by the Executive Committee of the Communist International (ECCI) for the Fourth Congress, attended the congress’s plenary sessions in November, and served on the Commission on the Eastern Question, where he played a prominent role. He would sit alongside M. N. Roy, Karl Radek, Georgy Safarov, Willem van Ravesteyn, Harry Webb, Salih Hacıoğlu, Sen Katayama, Chen Duxiu, Nahim Isakov, and Marcel Cachin. Tan Malaka also took part on the Commission on blacks representing the Dutch East Indies. He would serve alongside Otto Huiswoud, Rose Pastor Stokes, Jack Johnstone, Georgy Safarov, Sen Katayama, Tahar Boudengha, Jan Proost, William Joss, and Sidney Bunting.

Behind the context of the speech, Zinoviev, gave a report on the activity of the ECCI, worked since the Third Congress, to startoff off the congress. The delegates were given the opportunity to react. Due to the unusually lengthy duration of these comments, the initial speaking periods were limited, and ultimately the decision was made to halt the debate. With a need for clearance from the decisions of the Second Congress to Indonesian communists, Tan Malaka gave his thought to the wider congress by speech. In German, Tan Malaka spoke at its seventh session, held on Sunday, 12 November 1922 at 8 p.m., during the closing discussion on the report of the Executive Committee of the Communist International (ECCI).

== Speech ==
Tan Malaka began by arguing that the united-front policy could not be applied in the same manner in Europe and colonial Asia. In European countries, communist parties debated cooperation with social-democratic parties. In Java, he said, the possible partners were revolutionary nationalist and anti-colonial movements. He identified the economic boycott and the Muslim liberation movement as two common forms of anti-imperialist action in Asia. Although he viewed boycotts as a strategy associated with the nationalist bourgeoisie rather than communism, he argued that they could mobilise large populations under colonial rule. He cites to boycott efforts in Egypt, China and British India before questioning if communists should support such campaigns and how far their involvement should extend. In particular, Tan mentions of how the communist movement should relate to the Indian Swadeshi movement spurred by Gandhi, as well as whether communists should in general support such movements.

=== Pan-Islamism ===
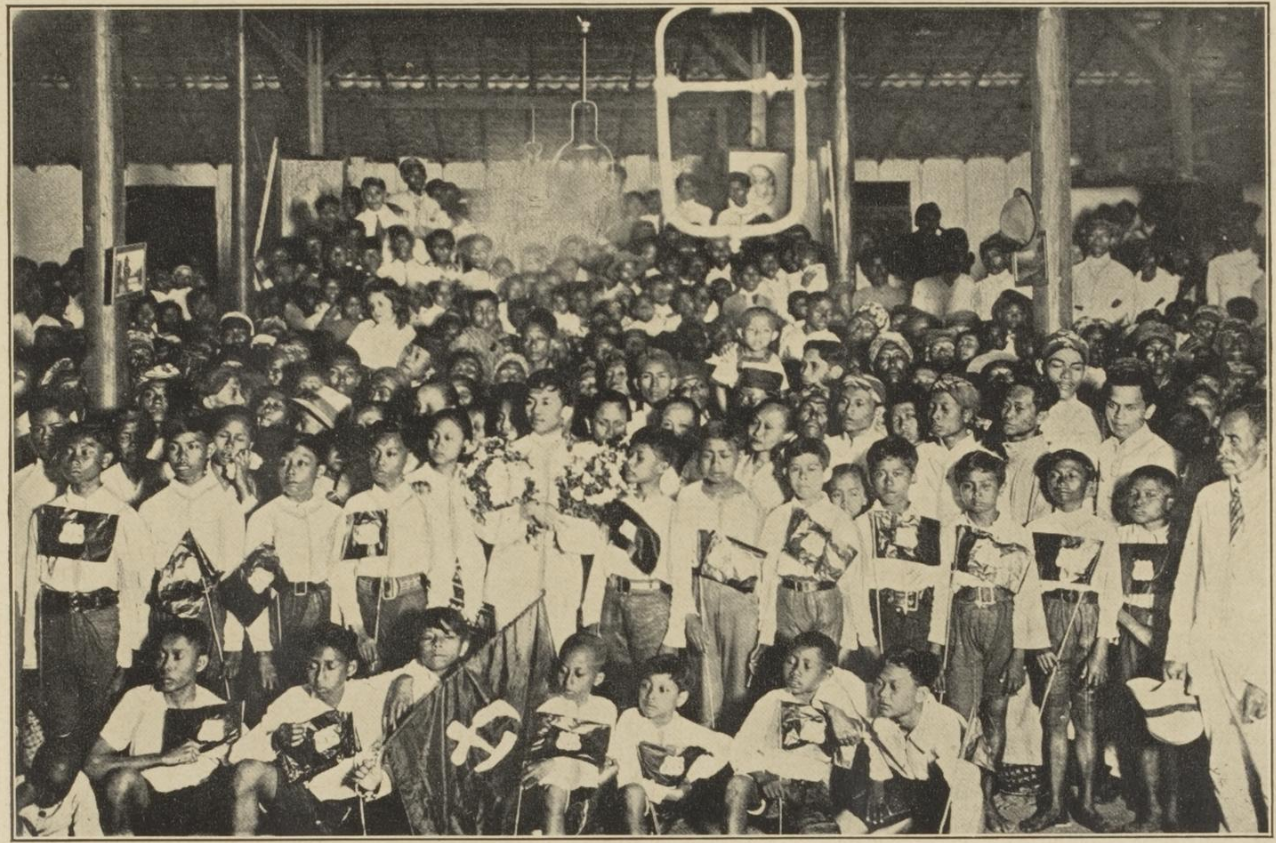
Graduation of a Sarekat Islam youth group in Semarang, with Tan Malaka standing at center with wreaths as a teacher (1922).

Tan Malaka then discussed the relationship between the communists and Sarekat Islam in the Dutch east Indies. He defined Sarekat Islam as a mass group including many impoverished peasants and asserted that communists had previously performed political activity via it. According to his interpretation, the two groups had supported comparable economic goals, albeit they conveyed them via distinct political and religious rhetoric.

He then reported to the comintern of a polictial rupture within the Sarekat Islam in 1921, wherein he attributed so partly to what he called the communists' "tactless criticism of the leaders of the Sarakat Islam". He said that colonial officials and their allies used the Comintern's opposition to Pan-Islamism under the decisions of the Second Congress to portray communists as enemies of Islam. This accusation, he argued, discouraged Muslim peasants from attending communist meetings even when they supported the party's economic programme. Tan Malaka also mentioned attempts to revive collaboration with Sarekat Islam. He claimed that Muslims may preserve their Islamic views while engaging in communist-led labour and anti-colonial actions. His examples included collaboration during a railway strike and the usage of Islamic allusions while addressing to Muslim audiences.

Pan-Islamism is the struggle for national liberation, for to Muslims Islam is everything: not only religion, but also the state, the economy, bread, and the whole order of life. Pan-Islamism today therefore signifies brotherhood among Muslims and the struggle for independence, not only for the Arabs, but for India, Java, and all oppressed Muslim peoples. This brotherhood signifies a practical war for freedom, not only against Dutch capitalism, but also against British, French, and Italian capitalism, and thus against capitalism in its entirety. That is what Pan-Islamism means today in Indonesia among a colonized and oppressed people.

— Tan Malaka, Komunisme dan Pan-Islamisme (1922)

Tan Malaka distinguished between what he regarded as the historical and contemporary meanings of Pan-Islamism. He associated its earlier form with conquest under a single caliph. He argued that this meaning no longer described the political activity of most Muslims living under colonial rule. In its contemporary form, he defined Pan-Islamism as solidarity among colonised Muslim peoples and as a struggle against European imperialism. Included were Arabs, Indians and Javanese among the peoples who could be connected through this movement. On this basis, he asked the congress whether communists should support Pan-Islamism when it operated as an anti-imperialist liberation movement.

According Gerard Vanter of De Tribune, at the end of the speech, "Congress gave Tan Malaka enthusiastic applause, as though it had given him an ovation. Such was a tribute to our comrades in the Indies, who have to wage a difficult struggle against brutal repression."

== Interpretation ==
According to Marxist historian, John Riddell, Tan Malaka's speech on the "[...] vivid portrayal of Communist struggle in the Dutch East Indies is among the most often cited passages of the congress proceedings." The speech has been discussed as an example of Tan Malaka's attempt to adapt communist strategy to conditions in colonial Indonesia. Tan's argument treated the Islamic religion as a political and social force that could not be understood solely through European debates about secularism and organised Christianity. Though Tan Malaka's position was a condition as he did not argue that communists should support every organisation using Islamic language. His distinction depended on whether a movement opposed imperial rule and mobilised colonised people, or whether it protected established political and economic hierarchies.

To academian Tohis, he interprets the address as an attempt to persuade the Communist International to cooperate with Pan-Islamism in the setting of colonial resistance. Historian Lin argues that Tan Malaka’s intention was not from political pragmatism and rather through Tan's genuine belief that a personal Islamic faith and a communist political commitment could be separated.

When I stand before God, then I am a Muslim, but when I stand before men, then I am no Muslim, for God has said that there are many Satans among men.

— Tan Malaka, Komunisme dan Pan-Islamisme (1922), On the separation of personal belief and ideology. Here, Tan references a verse from the Quran, Al-An'am.

=== Reaction and influence ===
Tan Malaka's speech was beyond the allocated minutes, with Julian Marchlewski reminding Tan Malaka about the overtime. Tan Malaka would reply "I come from the Indies; I have travelled forty days!" which was met with applause. Marxist historian Jonh ridell comments that Tan Malaka "appealed eloquently for adequate time," as the limited attention afforded to the colonial and Eastern questions was criticized by several delegates, including Willem van Ravesteyn, M. N. Roy, Sadrettin Celal Antel, Karim Nikbin, Harry Webb, Georgy Safarov. According to academic Harry A. Poeze, Malaka’s quick wit prevented his speech from being cut short, while the humor in his remarks won him considerable applause. Although agreed to allocate 10 minutes for delegates at the previous presidium by Radek's own insistence, only a representative of the Young Communist International and delegates from the Asian delegations were allowed five minutes of speaking time. Delegations representing thirteen countries also submitted a collective protest against the reduction of speaking time for discussion of the East and the colonies. Some delegates voiced concern over the lack of Asian involvement, time, and allocation; given the complexity of the issue (vocally by Ravesteyn and M. N. Roy within their speeches). More so to the perceived "domination of western parties" per Sadrettin Celal Antel. On this issue, Tan Malaka personally did not believe members of the Russian Bolsheviks imposed any act against Asian communists, stating;

A genuine revolutionary from whatever country, just like a scholar in whatever field of science, must have an ‘open mind’ toward the problems of revolution in other countries. In general, most of the leading figures in Russia adopted that attitude during the period when I was there, in 1922. They did not impose their own views concerning the character of the revolutionary movement in Asia—Indonesia, Hindustan, or China—and they left the nature of the measures to be taken in other countries to the Asian leaders themselves. They also understood very well that there was an 'X', an unknown factor, present in these countries, because the people there lived under conditions different from those in Russia, where they themselves had been born, educated, and had carried on their struggle. As a result, the discussions and debates at the congress and in the Comintern Executive were very extensive. We did not have to fear that some high authority would feel offended if criticism was made.

According to Tan Malaka's memoir From Jail to Jail, the issue was debated for up to three consecutive days within the Comintern's Eastern Commission, after which the Comintern representative responsible for the proposed thesis prevented him from speaking further. Tan Malaka subsequently raised the matter before the full congress, where, according to his account, it received a favourable response but no definite answer.

Tahar Boudengha of Tunisia, would come to support Tan Malaka's position, stating;

Comrade Malaka was recently in an awkward situation over the question of whether he could support pan-Islamism. There is no cause for awkwardness here. Pan-Islamism means nothing other than the unification of all Muslims against their oppressors. It must therefore be supported. [...] I believe that the concerns of Comrade Malaka are groundless. Our ideas have made greater gains among the Muslims than we foresaw. From every corner of the Muslim world, we received numerous good wishes because of the manner in which we wished to apply communism in the Muslim countries. This was especially true when we still had our Arabic publications.

Dutch communist, Willem van Ravesteyn, which was part of Tan Malaka's committee on the Eastern Question, also broadly supported the tenets of cooperation of with Islamic liberation movements with "sympathetically and at length." Van Ravesteyn, however, spoke somewhat patronisingly about Malaka when discussing his experiences at the congress in Amsterdam on January 4, 1923: "Malaka appeared there as the representative of a genuine party of Eastern communists and managed, in that amusing manner familiar to you all, to come to the fore—despite the imperfect German he speaks."

Helen Jarvis argues that Tan Malaka’s advocacy of a united front in Java with revolutionary nationalists, and his call for the Comintern to support nationalist boycotts and Pan-Islamism where they opposed colonial rule, may have helped move the Comintern away from the anti-nationalist position advanced by M. N. Roy at the Second Congress. John Ridell argues that Tan Malaka "helped convince the Fourth Congress (1922) to adopt a more flexible policy on pan-Islamism." He and Indian Historian, Vijay Prashad, believes that both with the argumentation of Tunisian delegate, Tahar Boudengha, and Dutch delegate, Willem van Ravesteyn, the Comintern incorporated and accommodated "an adjustment" in the Fourth Congress' 'Theses on the Eastern Question'.

However, Historian John T. Sidel notes that the congress resolutions on the 'Theses on the Eastern Question' remained ambiguous concerning Pan-Islamism and that the comintern was "[...] strikingly silent on the Netherlands East Indies, despite Communist organizational and mobilizational success far greater than achieved anywhere else in the East at that time." He concludes that Tan Malaka’s defence of communist–Pan-Islamist cooperation was "ultimately unsuccessful". Historian, Harry Poeze believes that Malaka's plea was ignored and that the Comintern continued to condemn religious movements such as Pan-Islamism. Political scientist Benedict Anderson similarly says Malaka's argument gained little credence among his European colleagues. Czech historian Rudolf Mrázek writes that many of the delegates apparently regarded Tan Malaka’s arguments as "too narrowly concerned with the Indonesian situation" and insufficiently attentive to the broader international problems facing the revolutionary movement. It is reported that Tan Malaka's ideas were not particularly well received by Karl Radek, given its support by some Asian delegates.

On the concerns of the eastern question, Tan Malaka was instead subsequently asked to prepare a book on Indonesia for the Comintern and was appointed to a commission responsible for drafting resolutions on the Eastern question by 1923. According to Tempo, this was initiated by Karl Radek himself, who personally asked Tan Malaka to write freely on any topic on Indonesia as a way to occupy his time whilst staying in Moscow. With the later approval of Zinoviev and Radek, Tan Malaka chose to focus on Indonesian history and statistics, including its population, industry, agriculture, and government. According to Mrázek, among members of the Indonesian Communist Party, such act "privately [drew] a certain envious concern over Tan Malaka's sudden prominence in the international movement".

Tan Malaka's position nevertheless found support among his followers, particularly Minangkabau nationalist leaders in Sumatra. His break with the comintern would contribute to a division between the Comintern-aligned Communist Party of Indonesia (PKI) and the political current associated with Tan Malaka, represented by the Indonesian Republic Party (PARI) and later by the Murba Party.

== Gallery ==
The following are publications of Tan Malaka to the Comintern;

Tan Malaka's 1923 German-language article Der Bolschewismus und das Problem des Orients ("Bolshevism and the Problem of the Orient"), preserved in the Comintern archives at RGASPI.

Russian edition of Tan Malaka's Indonesia and Its Place in the Awakening East, published in Moscow in 1924. This particular scan was from Ukrainian theatre director Les Kurbas's personal library. A copy was also held in Joseph Stalin's personal library.

== See also ==
- Islamic socialism
- National communism
- Sarekat Islam
