= Communist world =

Communist world may refer to:

- Communist Bloc, the Cold War grouping of socialist states aligned with the Soviet Union
- Second World, the western political concept from the Cold War for socialist states in the world
- World communism, a worldwide communist society
