= Isidoro Acevedo =

Isidoro Acevedo may refer to:

- a poem by Jorge Luis Borges commemorating his grandfather Isidoro de Acevedo Laprida
- Isidoro Acevedo (communist) (1867–1952), Spanish communist
