= Vasyl' Shakhrai =

Ukrainian political activist and Bolshevik revolutionary

Vasyl Shakhrai Василь Матвійович Шахрай
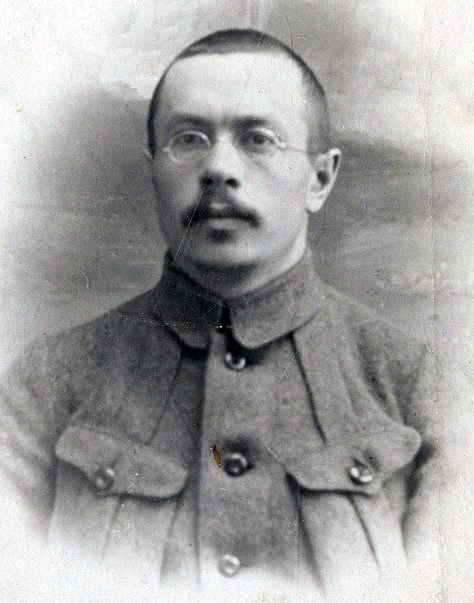

People's Secretary of Military Affairs
- In office December 24, 1917 – January 12, 1918
- Prime Minister: Yevgenia Bosch
- Preceded by: position created
- Succeeded by: Yuriy Kotsiubynsky

Personal details
- Born: February 11, 1888 near Pyriatyn, Piryatinsky Uyezd, Poltava Governorate
- Died: 1919 (aged 30–31) Kuban, Russian Republic
- Citizenship: Russia, Soviet
- Party: RSDLP(b) (1913)

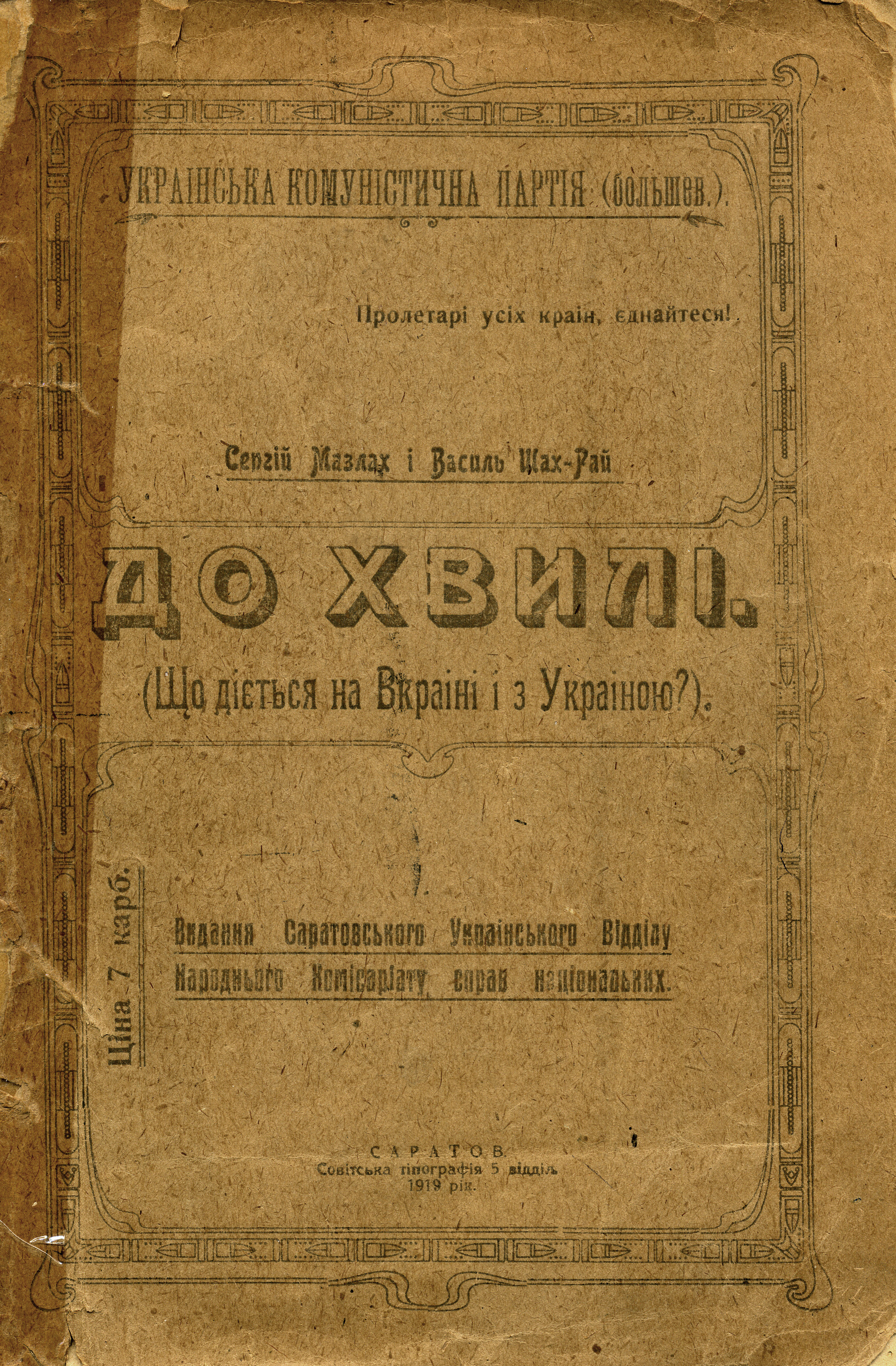
Title page of "On the current situation" by Vasyl' Shakhrai and Serhii Mazlakh

Vasyl' Matviyovych Shakhrai (Ukrainian: Василь Матвійович Шахрай; February 11, 1888 – 1919) was a Ukrainian political activist and Bolshevik revolutionary during the Russian Revolution.

He was a member of the Russian Social Democratic Labour Party (from 1913) and of the All-Ukrainian Central Executive Committee (from 1917 to 1918). He was also one of the leading theorists of Ukrainian national communism, the Secretary of Military Affairs in the Ukrainian People's Republic of Soviets and one of the founders of the Red Cossacks.

== Biography ==
Shakhrai joined the Bolsheviks after completing his training at the Military Academy in Poltava in 1917, while some sources claim that he was a member and activist of Bolsheviks since 1913. He was one of the few Ukrainians amongst the Poltava Bolsheviks. At the time the Bolsheviks were in a unified organisation with the local Mensheviks, but Shakhrai supported Serhii Mazlakh, a Poltava Bolshevik who successfully ousted the Mensheviks by August 1917.

Shakhrai and Mazlakh were then elected editors of the weekly newspaper. By this time Shakhrai was supporting Ukrainian national interests within the party. Although this caused concern amongst the predominantly Jewish local Mensheviks, he gained support amongst local Bolsheviks, who felt that it helped gain support amongst the largely anti-Russian Ukrainians of the region. Shakhrai was elected as a delegate to both the First All-Ukrainian Consultative Conference of the CP(b)U and the First All Ukrainian Congress of Soviets. He was also appointed the People's Commissar for Military Affairs in the Soviet Ukrainian government. In this capacity he accompanied Trotsky to Brest Litovsk for the treaty negotiations there in March 1918.

He was concerned about the suppression of Ukrainian cultural organizations by Russian Bolshevik troops who were sent to Ukraine in January and February 1918. Lenin consented to the dismemberment of Ukraine through the founding of the Donets-Krivoy Rog Soviet Republic as a ruse to place it outside the terms of the Brest Litovsk Treaty. Although this stratagem failed, it further raised concerns for Shakrai as regards to how the Bolsheviks were treating Ukraine. This concern was increased when Lenin gave a speech in November 1918, which called upon party functionaries to consider themselves Russian patriots. By December 1918 his alienation from the Bolsheviks was more or less complete.

His pamphlet The Revolution in Ukraine was published in November 1918, followed by On the Current Situation in Ukraine in January 1919. It led to Shakhrai expulsion from the CP(b)U in June 1919.

Shakhrai then went to Saratov, then occupied by Anton Denikin's White Volunteer Army. Here he worked on a number of underground newspapers, before being arrested and shot by Denikin's administration in autumn 1919.
