= Serhii Mazlakh =

Ukrainian Communist politician

Serhii Mykhailovych Mazlakh (Ukrainian: Сергій Михайлович Мазлах), born Serhiy Hryhorovych Robsman (Ukrainian: Сергій Григорович Робсман; 21 (O.S. 9) January 1878–26 November 1937) was a Ukrainian politician and one of the early proponents of National Communism. Known for his criticism of Lenin's national policy in Ukraine, he became a victim of political repression under the rule of Stalin.

== Biography ==
Serhiy Robsman was born in the village of Ivanivka (now part of Luhansk Oblast) into a family of a petty trader of Jewish ethnicity. He attended a two-class school, and starting from the age of 16 worked as a bread transporter at a local mine. In spare time, he also gave private lessons. In 1899 Mazlakh entered the Russian Social-democratic movement, eventually becoming a member of the Russian Social Democratic Labour Party. After three years of military service in Odesa, in early 1904 he emigrated to Switzerland, where he attended the universities of Bern and Geneva. After illegally returning to Russia in July 1907, he worked as a teacher in Mstislavl (now Belarus) and Poltava. Starting from 1912, Mazlakh worked as a statistician at the Poltava Governorate zemstvo.

After the February Revolution of 1917, Mazlakh became a member of the Poltava branch of RSDLP. After the party's split in August, he joined the Bolshevik fraction, becoming the head of its local committee. During that period he also headed the Poltava printers's trade union and served as a member of the city duma and local executive. Together with Vasyl Shakhrai, Mazlakh established and edited the Molot ("Hammer") newspaper. Unlike many Bolsheviks at the time, Mazlakh opposed extremist positions and supported democratic practices. He also voiced support for universals of the Central Rada, recognizing it as the chief organ of power in Ukraine and calling for its democratic transformation into an representative organ (soviet) of workers' peasants' and soldiers' deputies.

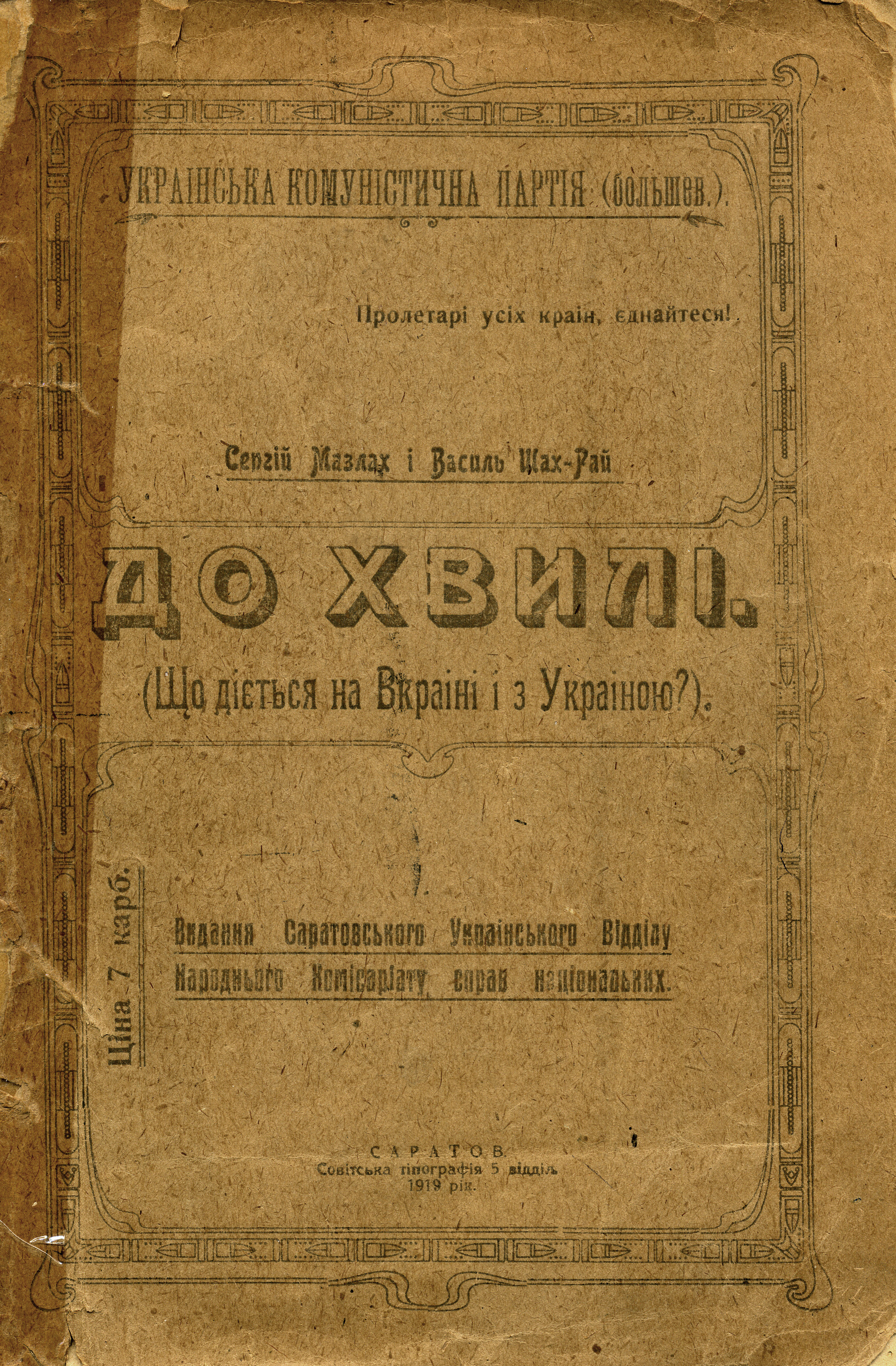
Pamphlet Do Khvyli ("On the Current Situation...") by Mazlakh and Shakhrai, published in Saratov in 1919

Between January and March 1918 Mazlakh served as the finance commissar of Poltava Governorate. Following the Austro-German occupation of Ukraine, he evacuated to Saratov, serving as head of the local collegium ofn the affairs of refugees and prisoners of war. He also headed the a subbranch of the Ukrainian department of the People's Commissariat for Nationalities. In February 1919 together with Shakhrai Mazlakh published a pamphlet calling for national autonomy of a united Ukraine and connecting the success of social revolution with solution of the national question. The pamphlet's authors accused a number of prominent Ukrainian Communists of Russian chauvinism, and argued for the establishment of a separate Ukrainian Communist Party. They also underlined discrepancies between the officially stated nationality policy of Lenin's government and real Bolshevik policies in Ukraine. This position signified the emergence of the first national opposition inside of the Communist Party and became the first formulation of National Communist ideas worldwide.

In March 1919, Mazlakh and Shakhrai arrived to Kharkiv, where they attempted to spread their pamphlet among delegates of the Third All-Ukrainian Congress of Soviets. As a result, both were expelled from the Communist Party of Ukraine, and banned from taking any posts in the state government. There were attempts to deport him from Ukraine, and his book was confiscated and destroyed. Not willing to continue his work illegally, Mazlakh sent an appeal to the Russian party leadership, and in May 1919 was restored in the organization. In the aftermath, he worked as a communal official in Poltava, and from December 1919 to May 1920 served as one of the leaders of Poltava Governorate party committee, editor of a local Soviet newspaper and local commissar for food supplies. On his post, Mazlakh proposed to replace prodrazverstka with free grain trade, which led to his removal and expulsion from Poltava. From May 1920, he worked as a deputy head of the regonal executive in Bakhmut, Donets Governorate. During that time he was also a member of the collegium of local Cheka , and until December 1921 edited the local newspaper. Until March 1922 he additionally headed the governorate's statistical bureau.

In 1922 Mazlakh was transferred to Kharkiv, where he participated in a commission on the organization of a party census. Between 1923 and 1924 he served as head of a trading institution and edited two newspapers. After his appointment as head of the Central Department of Statistics, Mazlakh became a member of the Ukrainian Council of People's Commissars. During that period he opposed the policies of War Communism, supported the liquidation of Poor Peasants' Committees and promoted Ukrainization. After his dismissal in 1927, Mazlakh worked in several people's commissariats of the Ukrainian SSR. In March 1931 he was appointed deputy head of the Central Direction of Economic Accounting at the Gosplan in Moscow. In 1933 Mazlakh became deputy head of the Directorate of Accounting and Reports at the Committee for Provision of the Council of People's Ministers.

On 7 August 1937 Mazlakh was arrested by the NKVD on the accusation of participating in a "right-wing counterrevolutionary organization". He was eventually accused of "Ukrainian nationalism", but refused to confess to his alleged crimes. On 25 November the Military Collegium of the Supreme Court of the Soviet Union sentenced Mazlakh to execution, which was performed on the next day in Moscow.

== Legacy ==
Any positive mentions of Mazlakh's name were prevented by the Communist regime in the Soviet Union, as demonstrated by a 1988 resolution issued by the Politburo of the Communist Party of Ukraine.
