= National communism =

Political ideology combining nationalism with communism

National communism is various forms in which Marxism–Leninism and communism has been adopted and/or implemented by leaders in different countries using aspects of nationalism or national identity to form a policy independent from communist internationalism. National communism has been described as movements and governments that have sought to form a distinctly unique variant of communism based upon distinct national characteristics and circumstances, rather than following policies set by other communist states, such as the Soviet Union.

In each independent state, empire, or dependency, the relationship between social class and nation had its own particularities. The Ukrainian communists Vasil Shakhrai, Alexander Shumsky, and Serhii Mazlakh and then the Tatar Sultan Galiyev, considered the interests of the Bolshevik Russian state at odds with those of their countries. Communist parties that have attempted to pursue independent foreign and domestic policies that conflicted with the interests of the Soviet Union have been described as examples of national communism; this form of national communism differs from communist parties/movements that embrace nationalist rhetoric. Examples include Josip Broz Tito and his independent direction that led Yugoslavia away from the Soviet Union, Imre Nagy's anti-Soviet democratic socialism, Alexander Dubček's socialism with a human face, and János Kádár's Goulash Communism.

Communist parties that have sought to follow their own variant of communism by combining communist/socialist ideals with nationalism have been described as national communist. These include the Socialist Republic of Romania under Nicolae Ceaușescu, the Democratic Kampuchea under Pol Pot, and North Korea under Juche.

Communism as Karl Marx and Friedrich Engels envisioned it was meant to be internationalist, as proletarian internationalism was expected to place class conflict well ahead of nationalism as a priority for the working class. Nationalism was often seen as a tool that the bourgeoisie used to divide and rule the proletariat (bourgeois nationalism) and prevent them from uniting against the ruling class. Whereas the influence of international communism was very strong from the late 19th century through the 1920s, the decades after that—beginning with socialism in one country and progressing into the Cold War and the Non-Aligned Movement, made national communism a larger political reality.

== Origins ==
=== 19th century ===
During the decade of the 1840s, communist came into general use to describe those who hailed the left wing of the Jacobin Club of the French Revolution as their ideological forefathers. In 1847, the Communist League was founded in London. The League asked Marx and Engels to draft The Communist Manifesto, which was adopted by the league and published in 1848. The Communist Manifesto included a number of views of the role of the nation in the implementation of the manifesto. The preamble says that The Communist Manifesto arose from Europeans from various nations coming together in London to publish their shared views, aims, and tendencies. Chapter one then discusses how the rise of the bourgeoisie has led to globalization and the place of national issues.

In Marxism and the Muslim World, Maxime Rodinson wrote: "Classical Marxism, for once faithful to Marx himself, postulates that a socialist state cannot be imperialist. But no proof is provided to support this thesis." According to Roman Rosdolsky: "When the Manifesto says that the workers 'have no country', this refers to the bourgeois national state, not to nationality in the ethnical sense. The workers 'have no country' because according to Marx and Engels, they must regard the bourgeois national state as a machinery for their oppression and after they have achieved power they will likewise have 'no country' in the political sense, inasmuch as the separate socialist national states will be only a transitional stage on the way to the classless and stateless society of the future, since the construction of such a society is possible only on the international scale."

=== 20th century ===
Yugoslav politician Milovan Đilas popularized the term "national communism" in his New Class (1957), where he wrote: "No single form of communism ... exists in any other way than as national communism. In order to maintain itself it must become national." In 1951, the Indian ex-communist Manabendra Roy wrote: "Communism in Asia is essentially nationalism painted red." Anton Pannekoek, a Dutch left communist, and Russian monarchists Nicholas Ustrialov and Vasilii Shulgin stated in 1920 that Russians first nationalized communism. They drew attention to how far the Bolsheviks differed from all other European social democratic parties in terms of structure and ideology and to the fact Vladimir Lenin's Bolshevik Party (formed from the left wing of the Russian Social-Democratic Labour Party) can be considered the first national communist party. In March 1918, Lenin renamed his party the Russian Communist Party. National communism also refers to non-Russian communist currents that arose in the former tsarist empire after Lenin seized power in the October Revolution (1917) and to the various communist regimes that emerged after 1945 in other parts of the world.

In the wake of their Russian counterparts, left-wing socialists in Ukraine and the Muslim areas of the former Russian Empire also developed distinct variants of communism that continued in the Soviet Union until 1928. Ukrainian and Muslim variants differed from each other on two points in particular. The Muslims believed the fate of world revolution depended on events in Asia and not Europe. They also argued alliances with the national bourgeoisie were necessary for the duration of the liberation struggle. Class divisions had to be ignored, otherwise the national bourgeoisie would turn away from national liberation, ally with their imperial counterparts and thus ensure the ultimate collapse of any revolutionary struggle and national liberation. In its Muslim variant, it was a synthesis of nationalism, communism and anarchism as well as religion. Muslim communists included people from groups which predated the Russian Revolution, joining the Russian Bolshevik Party between 1917 and 1920—some of whom later were Narkomnats under Joseph Stalin, the People's Commissar.

The term "national communism" was adopted by a small number of French fascists, such as politician Pierre Clémenti. The French National-Communist Party existed between 1934–1944 and espoused a national-communist platform noted for its similarities with fascism, and popularized racial antisemitism. The group was also noted for its agitation in support of pan-European nationalism and rattachism, maintaining contacts in both Nazi Germany and Wallonia. Later, the party would drop National-Communist from its name, renaming itself the French National-Collectivist Party.

The Murba Party was an Indonesian political party that proclaimed itself to be national communist. Historian Herbert Feith labelled the profile of the party as "extreme nationalism and messianic social radicalism (whose inchoateness was only mildly tempered by the Marxist and Leninist theory to which it laid claim), it was a citadel of 'oppositionism', the politics of refusing to recognize the practical difficulties of governments'."

== History ==
=== In Ukraine ===
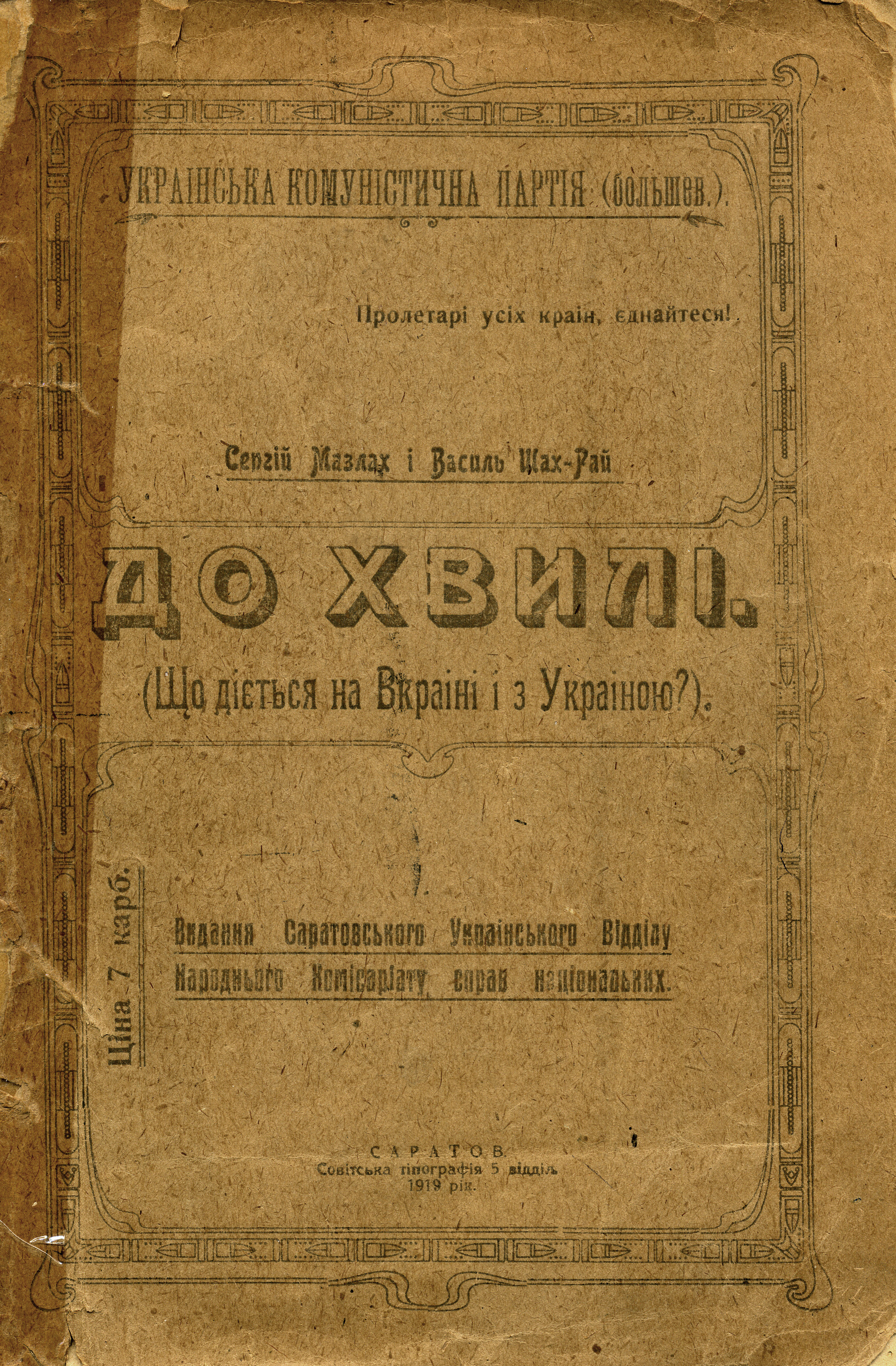
Pamphlet On the Current Situation... published by Shakhrai and Mazlakh in 1919

In 1918, the book Do Khvyli (translated into English as On The Current Situation in the Ukraine, as edited by P. Potichnyj in 1970), written by the Ukrainian communists Serhii Mazlakh and Vasyl' Shakhrai, challenged what they saw as Russian domination over Ukraine under Bolshevik rule. The precursors of the Ukrainian communists, the Ukrainian left-social democrats in March 1919 tried to direct the mass anti-Bolshevik uprising that began then in Ukraine but failed to win control over a sizable territory. Their main military force under Zeleny was defeated by July 1919. Faced with Anton Denikin's successful offensive, they decided to stop further military activity and ally with the Bolsheviks as the lesser evil. In January 1920, they formed the Ukrainian Communist Party, which recognized Russian Communist rule over Soviet Ukraine but criticized Bolshevik administrative, cultural, political, party, and economic centralization. In a letter submitted to the Third International that year, they extended the analysis of Shakhrai and Mazlakh.

Another prominent Ukrainian national communist movement were the Borotbists led by Alexander Shumsky. Shumsky took a more pro-Bolshevik position than Shakhrai as he started the January Uprising in an attempt to overthrow the UPR government. Shumsky also attempted to overthrow the hetman Pavlo Skoropadskyi through a revolution. Aside from Shumsky, the Borotbist current was represented by former Ukrainian Party of Socialist Revolutionaries members Ivan Maistrenko and Vasyl Ellan-Blakytny. Initially supporting the establishment of an independent Soviet-ruled Ukrainian state independent from Bolshevik control, in 1919 Borotbists adopted Communist positions, merged with the left wing of the Ukrainian Social Democratic Labour Party, and started cooperating with the Bolsheviks. In March 1920 the Borotbist party was forced to merge with the Communist Party (Bolshevik) of Ukraine, but most of its former members were later purged.

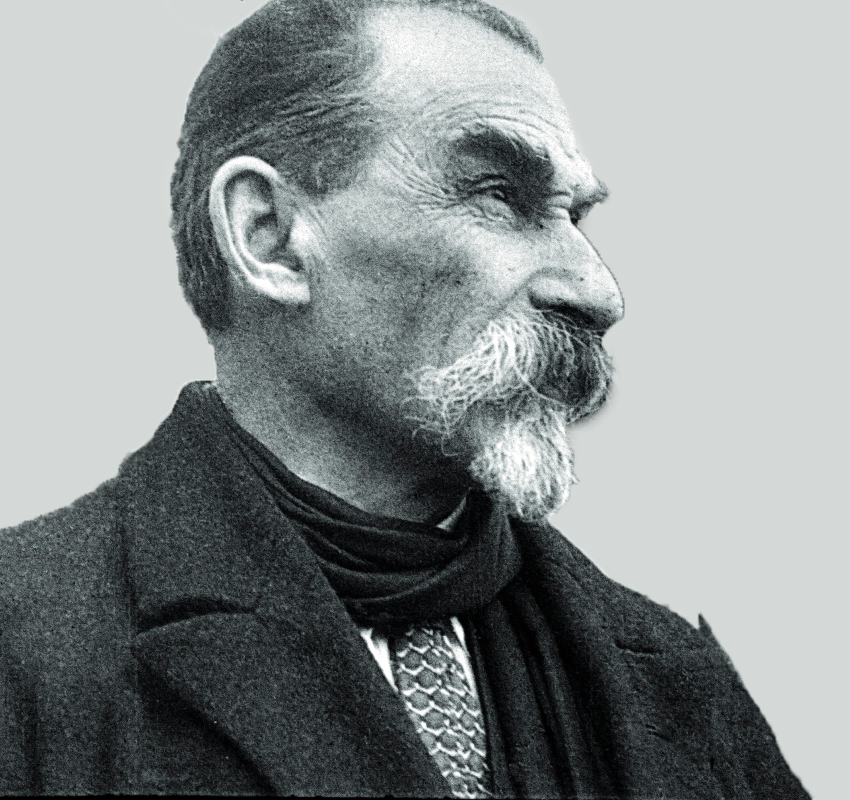
Mykola Skrypnyk

After the establishment of the USSR, Shumsky became a promoter of Ukrainization in the CPSU, and he contributed to the Korenizatsiya, which favored the promotion of language and culture of ethnic minorities in the USSR. Shumsky also took part in negotiations that led to of the Treaty of Riga. Due to his opposition to Russification by the Stalinist regime, he was later condemned in 1927 for his national communist position, which the Soviet authorities referred as ‘national deviation.’

Another notable figure in the development of Ukrainian national communism was Volodymyr Vynnychenko, whom Ivan L. Rudnytsky characterized as one of the ideologists of the movement, although his understanding of Marxist ideology was claimed to be limited exclusively to phraseology.

Modern historians tend to consider Mykola Skrypnyk to be the most prominent representative of national communism in Ukraine. Skrypnyk viewed Ukraine as an equal subject in a federation with Soviet Russia and engaged in establishment of a republican-level dictatorial system led by a self-sufficient Communist Party of Ukraine and supervised by state security organs. His goal was to unite Ukrainian Communists with their Russian counterparts through the Comintern.

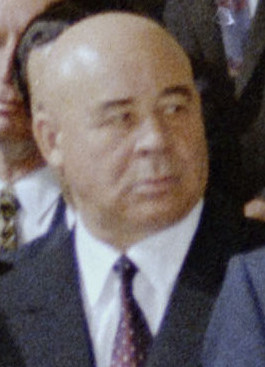
Petro Shelest shortly before his removal from leadership over Ukraine's Communist Party in 1972

Following the Holodomor and reintroduction of Russification by the Union government in Moscow, starting from 1933 the national communist current in Ukraine was liquidated, with its most prominent leaders such as Skrypnyk, Mykola Khvylyovy and Panas Lyubchenko committing suicide. Shumsky evaded that fate, but was still arrested and prosecuted by the regime in 1933, being labelled a nationalist and a counter-revolutionary, which led to his death sentence in 1937. In 1946, he was allegedly murdered by NKVD agents under the personal orders of Joseph Stalin, Nikita Khrushchev and Lazar Kaganovich during his transfer from Kyiv to Saratov.

In Western Ukraine national communism survived for a longer time, with its supporters being concentrated in the Communist Party of Western Ukraine.

After the Khrushchev Thaw, the national communist current in the Communist Party of Ukraine reemerged under the leadership of Petro Shelest, who believed in the possibility of developing Ukraine as both national and socialist state inside of the Soviet Union. However, following Shelest's removal and replacement by Volodymyr Shcherbytsky, another period of repression against Ukrainian culture and national intelligentsia started under the rule of Leonid Brezhnev.

During the dissolution of the Soviet Union, the Communist fraction in Verkhovna Rada was compelled to support the Declaration of Independence of Ukraine under pressure from National Democratic opposition. However, the reformed Communist Party of Ukraine refused to acknowledge national communism as part of its heritage, instead adopting a pro-Russian position, supporting separatist movements in the eastern and southern parts of the country and ignoring the issues of Ukrainian culture, language, history and identity. This resulted in the decline of left-wing politics in the country.

=== In Poland ===
Władysław Gomułka, communist leader in Poland who was arrested in 1948 for "right-nationalist deviations" and spent over 3 years in prison, came to power as a result of Polish October in 1956. Championing "Polish road to socialism", Gomułka promised to bring "a truly national communism" to Poland. Gomułka and his national communism gave rise to Endo-Communism represented by Mieczysław Moczar and his faction - an ideology that was said to combine Marxism-Leninism with the tradition of the right-wing National Democracy movement and that was described as a "peculiar marriage of authoritarian Communism and chauvinist nationalist tendencies". Endo-Communism grew dominant and emerged as the de facto state ideology of the Polish People's Republic in the 1960s.

=== In Muslim regions of the former Russian Empire (1919–1923) ===
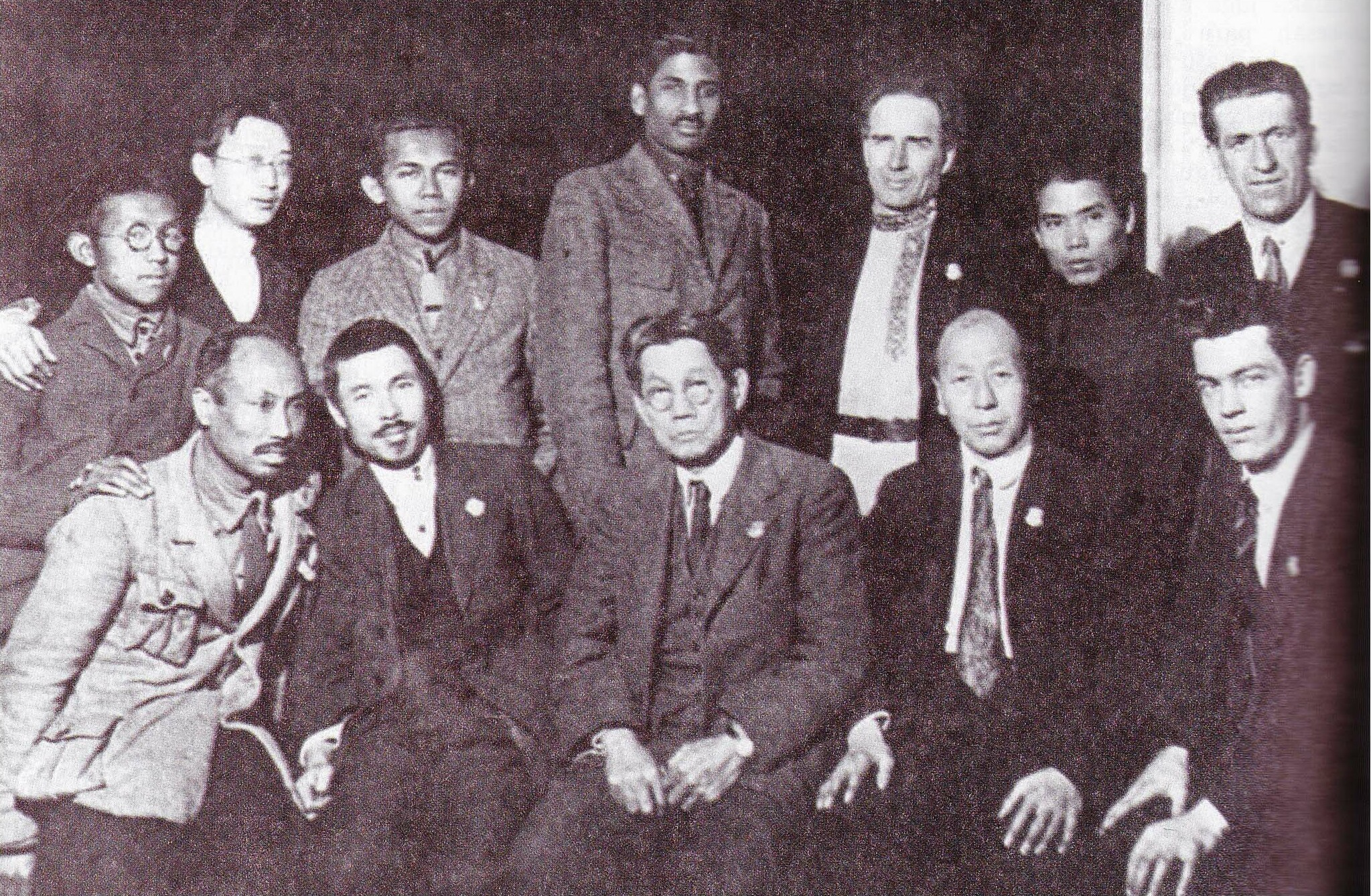
Backrow-left; Liu Renjing, Qu Qiubai, Tan Malaka, M. N. Roy. Front-row; Chen Duxiu (left) and Sen Katayama (Middle). Tan Malaka argued against the outcome of the Second Congress. His political thought subsequently developed toward a form of national communism adapted to Indonesian nationalism and conditions.

Open conflict between prominent Muslim theorists such as Mirsäyet Soltanğäliev on the one hand and Lenin and Stalin on the other broke out in 1919 at the Second Congress of the Communist International over the autonomy of the Muslim Communist Party. This also happened at the Congress of the Peoples of the East, the First Conference of the Turkic Peoples' Communists of Soviet Russia, and more significantly at the Tenth Congress of the Bolshevik Party (April 1921). The crisis resulted in the purge of the Communist Party of Turkestan in December 1922 and the arrest of Sultan Galiev in 1923. Galiev was the first Bolshevik Party member to be arrested by Stalin. The immediate cause of his arrest were his comments on the 12th Congress resolutions regarding concessions to non-Russians. Stalin was infuriated that Galiev rejected his juxtaposition of great-power chauvinism with local nationalism. Galiev commented that reaction to great-power chauvinism was not nationalism, and it was simply reaction to great-power chauvinism. Nine days later, he was arrested.

During this time, Soltanğäliev, Turar Ryskulov, Nariman Narimanov, and Ahmet Baytursunov were very influential, especially through the Communist University of the Toilers of the East, which opened in 1921 and was very active until its staff was purged in 1924. Communists from outside the Soviet Union, such as Manabendra Nath Roy, Henk Sneevliet, and Sultan Zade, also taught there, formulating similar political positions. Students of the university included Sen Katayama, Tan Malaka, Liu Shaoqi, and Ho Chi Minh.

The great purge in the Muslim republics began in 1928 with executions of Veli İbraimov of the Tatar Communist Party and Milliy Firqa followed by the leaders of Hummet, the Tatar Communist Party, and the Tatar Union of the Godless. It also happened in Azerbaijan, Kazakhstan, and the Young Bukharians.

=== In Romania (1960s–1980s) ===
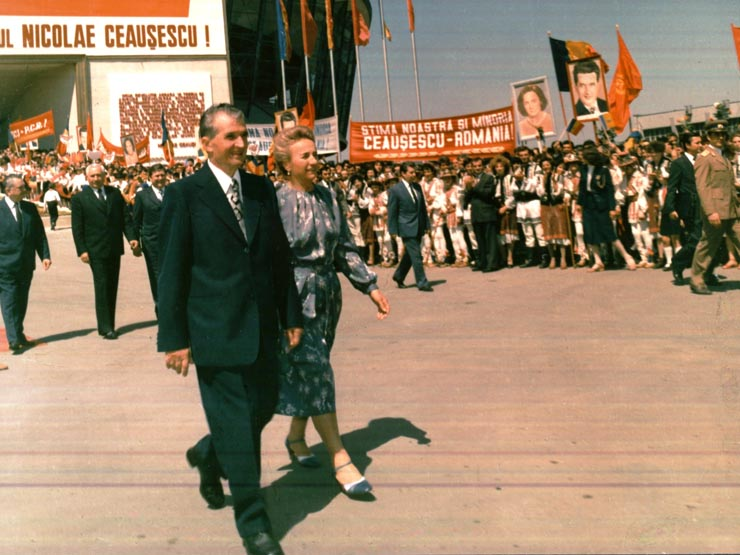
Nicolae Ceaușescu and his wife, Elena Ceaușescu, in 1986. Under Ceaușescu, the Romanian Communist Party adopted Romanian nationalism as part of its ideology.

Although the term "national communism" was never officially used by the Romanian Communist Party, it has been used to describe the ideology of the Socialist Republic of Romania between the early 1960s and 1989. Gheorghe Gheorghiu-Dej originally developed an emphasis on Romanian nationalism when attempted to pursue a more autonomous domestic and foreign policy independent from the Soviet Union. This culminated in 1964 when Gheorghiu-Dej announced a "declaration of independence", abandoning communist internationalism. Gheorghiu-Dej's successor, Nicolae Ceaușescu, developed this further by combining both Marxist–Leninist principles and doctrines of Romanian nationalism. In 1971, through his July Theses manifesto, Ceaușescu declared a national cultural revolution. National communism in Romania was built around Ceaușescu's cult of personality and the idealization of Romanian history, also known as protochronism. The main argument of the tenet was the endless and unanimous fighting throughout two thousand years to achieve unity and independence. The National Communism of Ceaușescu is described to be chauvinist.

Part of Romanian national communism was the rehabilitation of Romanian historical figures who had previously been denounced by the communist regime. Examples include the nationalist historian Nicolae Iorga and Ion Antonescu, a fascist Conducător. These figures were deemed as Romanian patriots despite their strong anti-communist views.

=== In Bulgaria ===
The Bulgarian Communist Party advocated for left-wing nationalism during the Second World War and the early post-war years in the sense of national liberation; afterwards, they began to reject nationalism. Years later Lyudmila Zhivkova, the daughter of Todor Zhivkov combined cultural nationalism with Marxism-Leninism, while Todor Zhikov openly rejected nationalism, he is still described as nationalist, extreme nationalist and chauvinist. Due the rise of ethno-nationalism in Bulgaria, the communism in Bulgaris got called "Xenophobic Communism".

Georgi Dimitrov wrote following in 1941:

We will have to develop the idea of combining a healthy, properly understood nationalism with proletarian internationalism. Proletarian internationalism should be grounded in such a nationalism in the individual countries. Comrade Stalin made it clear that between nationalism properly understood and proletarian internationalism there can be no contradictions. Rootless cosmopolitanism that denies national feelings and the notion of a homeland has nothing in common with proletarian internationalism. Such cosmopolitanism paves the way for the recruitment of spies.

=== In Hungary ===
János Kádár gets described as national communist with even the CIA describing him as such, however Kádár made it clear in his speeches that he supported proletarian internationalism and socialist patriotism, however in practice in terms of media, banal nationalism was supported. After Kádár, national communism in Hungary is seen as chauvinist. Tibor Szamuely and Béla Kun both had somewhat nationalistic views, especially after the Little Entente declared war on the Hungarian Soviet Republic and many Hungarian Communists had negative views of the Slavic minorities because most of them joined the White Army.

"Just as a diligent, good gardener chases away the children who climb over the fence to steal apples, so do the Hungarian workers chase away the Romanians and Czechoslovaks. These factories and plants, these forests and fields, villages and towns—all this is ours, and we will not give them to anyone—this is how the Hungarian proletarians think. Naturally, this is indeed the case. We will not give up Soviet Hungary to anyone." - Szamuely Tibor.

=== In Vietnam ===
The Communist Party of Vietnam (CPV) was founded in 1930, competing with nationalist parties. In 1941, it established the Viet Minh as a coalition front. Amid the Indochina wars and the broader Cold War, anti-communist nationalists claimed that the communists had betrayed genuine nationalists, insisting that Vietnamese communism and Vietnamese nationalism were mutually exclusive. The communists, however, have portrayed themselves as the sole legitimate leaders of Vietnamese nationalism to legitimize the authority of the Communist Party.

Ho Chi Minh rejected the "traditional conservative Vietnamese nationalist course". He also rejected selfish nationalism and rather advocated for patriotism, besides that he still saw nationalism as a driving force against colonized states. While seeing it as a driving force, Ho and the Viet Minh fought against "short-sighted nationalism and great-power chauvinism." According to Ho, however, "genuine patriotism" could "never be separated from proletarian internationalism". Ho's Vietnamese nationalism was for multiculturalism. The CPV and its government supports socialist patriotism.

== See also ==
- Endokomuna
- Left-wing nationalism
- National Bolshevism
- North Korean nationalism
- Socialist patriotism
- World communism

== Bibliography ==
- Bennigsen, A., Muslim national communism in the Soviet Union : a revolutionary strategy for the colonial world (1979).
- Ford, Christopher (2009). "Outline History of the Ukrainian Communist Party (Independentists): An Emancipatory Communism 1918–1925". Debatte: Journal of Contemporary Central and Eastern Europe. 17 (2): 193–246. doi:10.1080/09651560903172274. S2CID 145338689.
- Gizzatullin H. G., D.R., Sharafutdinov D.R., eds., Mirsaid Sultan-Galiev. Izbrannye trudy (Moscow, 1998).
- Mace, J., Communism and the dilemmas of national liberation : national communism in Soviet Ukraine, 1918-1933 (1983).
- Mace, James (1993). "National communism". Encyclopedia of Ukraine.
- Rosdolsky, R., 'The Workers and the Fatherland: A Note on a Passage in the "Communist Manifesto"', International (London) 4.2 (Winter 1977)
- Velychenko S., "Ukrainian anticolonialist Thought in Comparative Perspective," AB IMPERIO no. 4 (2012)
- idem, Painting Imperialism and Nationalism Red. The Ukrainian Marxist Critique of Russian Communist Rule in Ukraine (1918-1925) (Toronto, 2015)
