= William Earsman =

William Paisley Earsman
- Born: 16 March 1884; Edinburgh, Scotland
- Died: 13 January 1965 (aged 80); Edinburgh, Scotland

William Paisley Earsman (1884–1965) was a metalworker and one of the founding members of the Communist Party of Australia and its first general secretary.

Refused re-entry to Australia after attending the Fourth Congress of the Comintern in Moscow in May 1922, Earsman remained in the United Kingdom where he was placed under surveillance by MI5.

He was also a “self-educated trades worker who by his own admission had studied very few of the Marxist classics,” and a strong advocate for Independent working class education, arguing that “if we want education, let us have it and manage it for ourselves.”

He became a local councillor in Edinburgh and later ran as the Labour candidate for the Edinburgh South division at the 1945 and 1950 General Elections. He was appointed an Officer of the Order of the British Empire (OBE) in 1950 for his work with the Edinburgh Festival.
