= World communism =

Communism of an international scope

The Comintern logo depicts a communist world.

World communism, also known as global communism or international communism, is a form of communism placing emphasis on an international scope rather than being individual communist states. The long-term goal of world communism is an unlimited worldwide communist society that is classless, moneyless, stateless, and nonviolent, which may be achieved through an intermediate-term goal of either a voluntary association of sovereign states as a global alliance, or a world government as a single worldwide state.

A series of political internationals have proposed world communism as a primary goal, including the First International, the Second International, the Third International (the Communist International or Comintern), the Fourth International, the Revolutionary Internationalist Movement, Maoist Internationalist Movement, the World Socialist Movement, and variant offshoots. The methods and political theories of each International remain distinct in their pursuit of the global communist society.

During the early years of the Stalin era (1927–1953), the theory of socialism in one country flew in the face of the generally accepted practice of Marxism at the time, and became part of the ideology of the Communist Party of the Soviet Union. According to Joseph Stalin and his supporters it was naïve to think the world revolution was imminent in the 1920s–1930s after the USSR's failure to conquer Poland in 1919 and the defeat of the People's State of Bavaria. With the rise in socialist states post-WWII various splits occurred, namely the Tito-Stalin split, the Mao-Khrushchev split, and the Sino-Albanian split, further exacerbating the prospect of a soon-to-be worldwide revolution, alongside nationalistic tendencies in countries such as Romania and North Korea fomenting a non-aligned front.

The end of the Cold War, with the Revolutions of 1989 and the dissolution of the Soviet Union, is often regarded as the fall of communism. Nevertheless, the international communist tendencies remain among Maoists, Trotskyists, left communists, and some present-day Russian communists among others seeking to further refine and revise the theory of dialectical materialism.

== Early era (1917–1944) ==
The flag of the Chinese Soviet Republic which depicts a hammer and sickle spanning the globe as proletarian internationalists believed that one focus of a communist revolution was to ensure another successful revolution elsewhere

Marxist philosophers had observed in the turn of the century that because capitalism had begun to exhaust the low hanging fruit of domestic exploitation whether on a national or a continental scale, it had become Imperialist and sought out the global exploitation of markets by colonization and subsequent wealth extraction, and workers by the rampant exploitation of labour. This drive for profit as the sole motivating force of the capitalist class compels class solidarity among the now international capitalist class of the world against any attempt to unify in solidarity by the now also international workers of the world, with the capitalist class' goal being to maintain profitability and thus their class' dominance as the engine and reason for the class conflict. Recognition by people of the pain of this exploitation by capitalists inexorably unites the proletariat of the world and necessitates international cooperation to halt the suffering of humankind. This proletarian internationalism has as its aim the end of continuous subjugation via divide and rule by the comparatively few capitalists who seek to stop the development of class consciousness in their workers lest they too form trade unions to counter the capitalists monopolies; (thus the rallying cry of communists, "Workers of the world, unite!"). In this view, after a transitional period of international socialism, the terminal stage of development of the (future) history of communism would likewise be replaced by world communism, defined by world peace.

Theorists have differed on whether world communism may be achieved peacefully despite evidently ongoing class conflict. Those who believe the capitalist class would not put down their property rights to become workers again believe the transition to world communism must be more contentious. World communism as the utopian final goal of the class conflict can only be achieved by world revolution as "injustice anywhere is a threat to justice everywhere" in the words of noted socialist, Martin Luther King Jr. As such, World communism is ultimately incompatible with the permanent existence of the nation state formation as a means of organizing people and property.

Orthodox Marxism posits a transitional period of Socialism which then continues to develop the productive forces and alleviate drudgery until either the state becomes irrelevant to organizing human activity and the people agree to the abolition of the state, or the now useless state undergoes what Marx and Engels call the withering away of the state. When governance no longer requires state institutions or state power no one would desire it nor wield it. In other words, the people of a utopian communist society would be self-governing via direct democracy so direct that the state would not even exist. Abolition of the state is not in itself a distinctively Marxist doctrine, but was held by various socialist and anarchist thinkers of the nineteenth century as well as some present-day anarchists. Friedrich Engels’ Anti-Dühring is often cited as saying "The state is not 'abolished,' it withers away". This is a pioneer work of historical materialism, a formulation of Marx's idea of a materialist conception of history. The withering away of the state is a graphic formulation, that has passed into cliché. The translation (Engels was writing in German) is also given as: "The state is not 'abolished'. It dies out". Engros believed this happens only after the proletariat has seized the means of production. The schematic is therefore: revolution, transitional period, ultimate period. Although the ultimate period sounds like a utopia, Marx and Engels did not consider themselves utopian socialists, but rather scientific socialists.

Whereas for Engels the transitional period was reduced to a single act, for Lenin thirty to forty years later it had become extended and "obviously lengthy". In the same place, he argues strongly that Marx's conception of communist society is not utopian, but takes into account the heritage of what came before.

Lenin’s position on world communism, then, by the time the Comintern was set up in 1919, was: world revolution is necessary for the setting up of world communism, but not as an immediate or clearly sufficient event.

== Stalinist and Cold War era (1945–1992) ==
As the theory of socialism in one country challenged Trotsky's permanent revolution, the Soviet Union dissolved the Third International during World War II. However, Stalin did not intend to implement isolationism despite this one-country approach.

In a 1936 interview with journalist Roy W. Howard, Stalin articulated his rejection of world revolution and stated that "We never had such plans and intentions" and that "The export of revolution is nonsense".

Nevertheless, Stalin also supported revolutionary socialism around the world to continue to work toward world communism, however distant it might be. Thus it backed the 26th of July Movement in the Cuban Revolution, the North Vietnamese in the Vietnam War and the MPLA in the Angolan Civil War. The domino theory of the Cold War was driven by this intent as anti-communists feared that isolationism by capitalist countries would lead to the collapse of their self-defense.

== Collapse and survival (1993-present) ==
Communist-ruled states survived in China, Cuba, Laos, North Korea, and Vietnam, after severe internal crises. In 1989–1992 the party control collapsed in other Communist states, which then entered into Post-communism. Yugoslavia plunged into a long complex series of wars between ethnic groups. Soviet-oriented Communist movements collapsed in countries where it was not in control.

== See also ==
- Communist nostalgia
- Dissolution of the Soviet Union
- Fall of communism in Albania
- History of communism § Contemporary communism (1993–present)
- List of communist parties with national parliamentary representation
- National communism
- Post-communism
- Predictions of the collapse of the Soviet Union
- Proletarian internationalism
- Revolutions of 1989
- Exporting the Islamic Revolution
