= Hertha Sturm =

Hertha Sturm (born Edith Fischer, 24 July 1886: died while in state custody before or during 1945) was a German political activist (SPD, KPD) who after 1933 became a resistance activist. She spent most of the twelve Nazi years in state detention, during which time she was badly tortured and made at least one suicide attempt. She did not outlive the Nazi regime.

Hertha Sturm is the name by which she is identified in most sources referring to her political actions and to her experiences under the Nazis. It was the name she took on for her Communist Party work in January 1920 and retained thereafter. In addition to her birth name, Edith Fischer, she may also be identified after 1912, by her married name, as Edith Schumann.

== Life ==
=== Provenance and early years ===
Edith Fischer was born in Königsberg, at that time part of Germany, and the capital of East Prussia. Her father was a book dealer. She attended an all-girls' school in Königsberg till 1902 and then, between 1903 and 1906, the teacher training college. After this, between Easter 1906 and Autumn 1907, she was employed as a home tutor. She then passed the necessary exams to gain admittance to the University of Königsberg where for five semesters (probably two and a half years) she studied medicine.

In 1911 she joined the German Social Democratic Party (SPD). That year she also transferred to Leipzig University and embarked on the study of socio-economics ( "Volkswirtschaftslehre" / "Nationalökonomie"), a subject in which three years later, in July 1914, she would obtain her doctorate. Meanwhile, in 1912 Edith Fischer married Hermann Schumann. In 1914 she relocated to the other side of the country and took a job with the regional statistical office in Karlsruhe. The First World War broke out in July 1914, and by October 1915 Edith Schumann was in Berlin, working as an expert advisor and assistant at a surgery and work advice centre for war widows. She stayed in Berlin at least till the end of 1916. Between February 1917 and August 1918 she worked as a volunteer in the women's section of the wartime detention centre in Magdeburg: after August 1918 she was similarly employed in Munich.

=== Communist politics ===
She was still based in Munich in January 1919 when she joined the newly formed Communist Party of Germany (KPD), as a result of which she was dismissed from her wartime work. Military defeat was followed by a succession of uprisings across Germany, and in Munich Edith Schumann worked for the short-lived Bavarian Soviet Republic as a technical assistant to the secretariat of the Executive Council and Economic Council. After the Bavarian Soviet was crushed by a combination of still loyal government forces and "Freikorps" anti-communist volunteer units she fled from Munich after a warrant for her arrest, invoking the usual charge of "assisting high treason", had been issued. However, at the end of May 1919 she was arrested and then held in investigative custody in Munich's Stadelheim Prison. After two months the authorities closed the investigation, citing "lack of evidence".

In December 1919 Edith Schumann arrived in Berlin at the national headquarters of the Communist Party where in January 1920, under the party name Hertha Sturm, she started a job in the party's national women's secretariat. Following the 3rd party congress which took place in February 1920 she became secretary to the national women's secretariat and also managing editor of the party news-magazine "Kommunistin" ("The [female] communist"). In 1921 Sturm participated as a member of the German delegation in the Second World Congress of the Comintern, held under the chairmanship of Grigory Zinoviev in Moscow during late July and early August. Here she was elected to the International Women's Secretariat (IWS), a position she occupied between 1921 and 1924.

After this she became increasingly high-profile within the party, back in Berlin becoming international secretary of the IWS for Western Europe. However, throughout the 1920s the party proved itself prone to factionalism, and as the decade progressed, both in Berlin and in Moscow, the direction of the party was increasingly dictated by its non-inclusive hardline wing. At the ninth party conference, held in 1924, Hertha Sturm presented a paper on women's work. The left wing party leadership then identified her as "rightist" and removed her from her senior posts. (She was succeeded at the IWS by Erna Halbe/Lang.) Sturm relocated to Moscow where between October 1924 and October 1928 she worked on IWS and other Comintern matters in close collaboration with Clara Zetkin.

After she returned to Germany in 1928 Sturm found she was still identified as "rightist" and so she was not able to work for The Party in its head office. She nevertheless retained her party membership, while obtaining a job with the state statistical office in Berlin.

=== Nazi years ===
In January 1933 the Nazi Party took power and lost little time in transforming Germany into a one-party dictatorship. The Reichstag fire at the end of February 1933 was promptly blamed on "communists" and those who had been politically active in the (now illegal) Communist Party of Germany either fled abroad or else found themselves targeted by the authorities. On 10 March 1933 Hertha Sturm was arrested in Berlin by members of the ruling party's quasi-military wing (SA): she was held in "protective custody" until 17 January 1934.

In the summer of 1934 she made contact with Neu Beginnen ("New Start") and, using the cover names Gerda Stein and Ellen Croner, she worked with this left wing socialist group. On 4 September 1935 Hertha Sturm was arrested in Cologne. She was badly tortured and made a suicide attempt. Her case was heard on 12 March 1936 when the Berlin state court sentenced her to a five-year prison term. Hertha Sturm's subsequent fate remains unknown. The only available information comes from a letter sent by Ernst Torgler to Ruth Fischer. The letter is dated 27 November 1948, and in it Togler states in a passing comment, and without further elaboration, that Hertha Sturm lost her life in an air raid.
