= Johannes Proost =

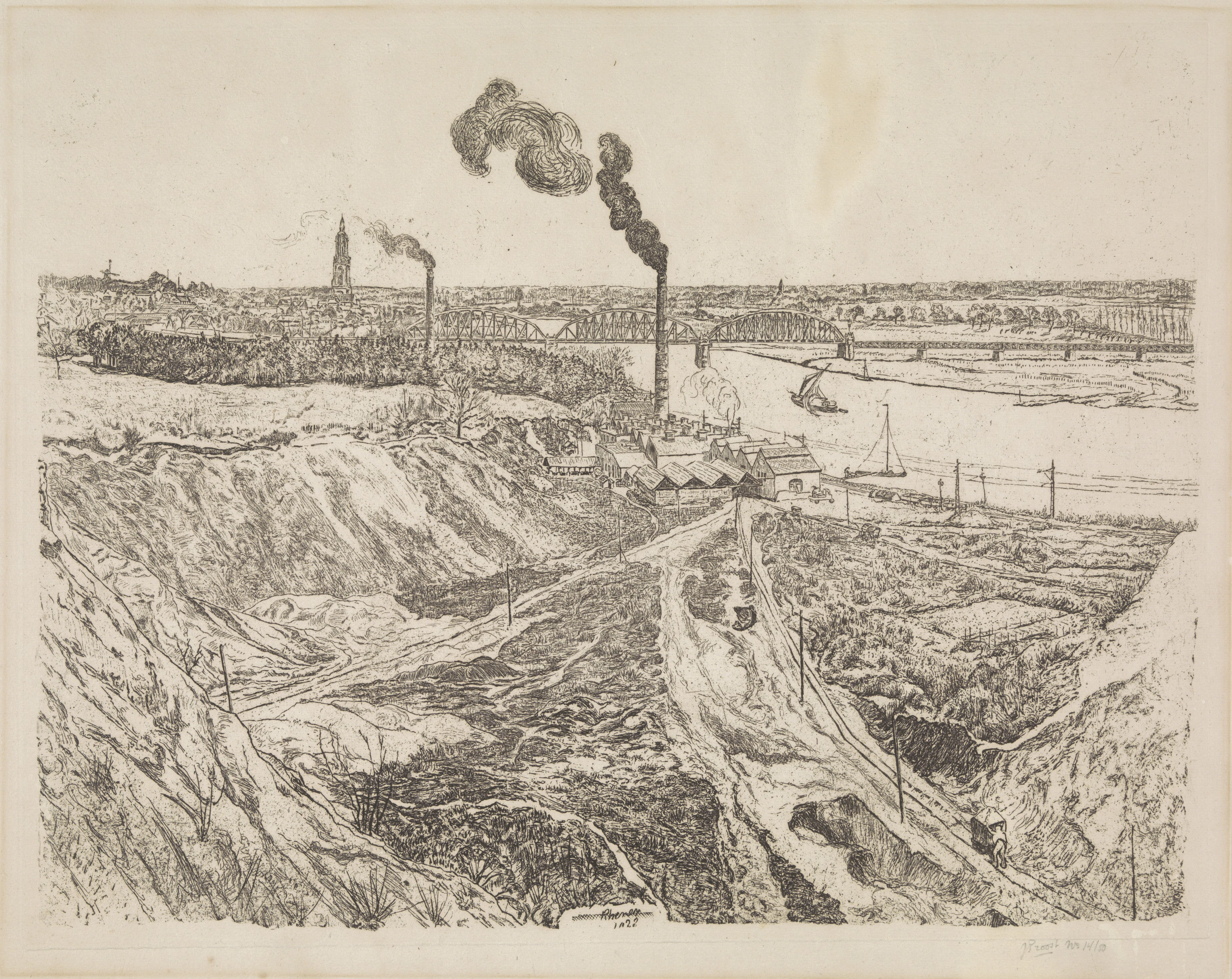
Rhenen city landscape painted by Proost in 1928

Johannes Proost also known as Jan Jansen, (Geervliet, February 27, 1882 — Oranienburg, March 26, 1942) was a Dutch artist and left-wing politician, a member of the executive committee of the Comintern.

== Biography ==
Proost was a son of Pieter Proost (a pastor) and Catherina Maria Jacoba Ternooij Apel, a family of intellectuals. He was married (1905—1914) to Charlotte Sjouerman. Proost was an artist and engraver, he had a studio in Rotterdam in 1940.

Within the left-wing, Proost took part in the Dutch socialist movement. He closely collaborated with David Wijnkoop. On his instructions, during the First World War, he went to Germany several times to establish contacts with local internationalists.

After the establishment of the Communist Party of Holland, the movement became a part of this party. In 1920, together with Wijnkoop, he represented the CPN at the Second Congress of the Comintern in Moscow. On August 7, 1920, after the end of the congress, Wijnkoop and Jansen became members of the ECCI. He was a member of the American agency in Mexico. In June–July 1921, he represented the CPN at the Third Congress of the Comintern, in June 1923 — at the Third Extended Plenum of the ECCI, where he participated in the work of the Australian and Danish committees.
