= Harry Webb (communist) =

British communist activist

Harry Webb (1892 – 1962) was a British communist activist.

Born in Norton (later a suburb of Sheffield), Webb followed his sister Lily to Ashton-under-Lyne, where he worked in a cotton mill. At age 17, he joined the Socialist Labour Party (SLP) despite its limited presence in the Manchester area. In the January 1910 UK general election, Webb campaigned for William McGee, an independent labour candidate in Ashton-under-Lyne.

After the October Revolution, Webb supported the formation of a single, national communist party, and signed the manifesto of the Communist Unity Group, a splinter group from the SLP. This led him to join the Communist Party of Great Britain (CPGB). He was elected to its executive in 1921, arguing against parliamentarianism and CPGB affiliation with the Labour Party. That same year he became a CPGB organiser in Sheffield.

In 1923, Webb moved to Salford and was active in the Salford South Divisional Labour Party, alongside many other CPGB members. In 1928, he moved to Liverpool to become a CPGB organiser there. During World War II, he relocated to Manchester. In 1947, he was the CPGB's Prospective Parliamentary Candidate for Ashton but did not stand in the 1950 general election.
