= Isidoro Acevedo (communist) =

Spanish politician

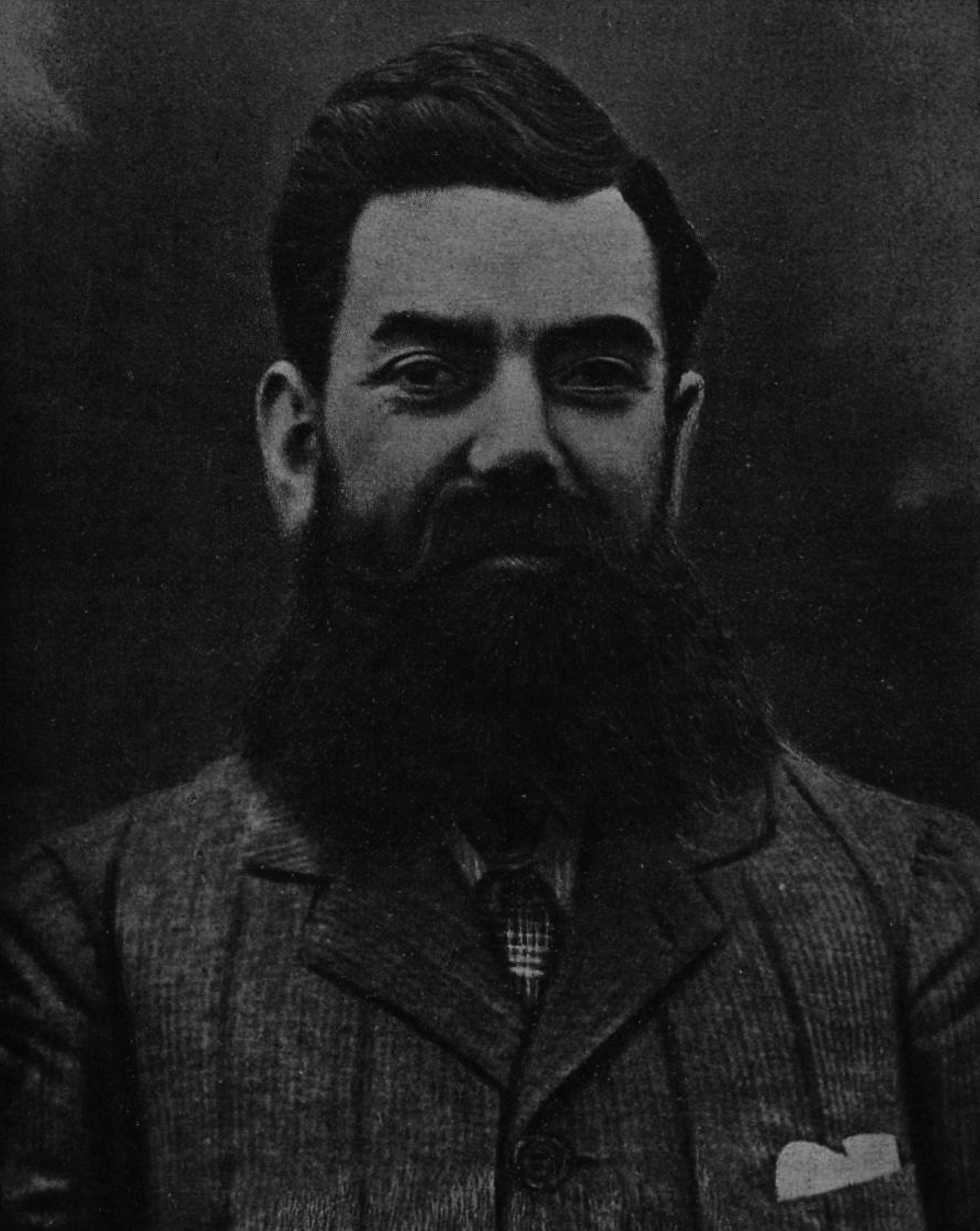
Isidoro Acevedo in 1911

Isidoro Acevedo (born Isidoro Rodríguez González; 2 January 1867 in Luanco, Spain – 1952 in Moscow, Soviet Union) was a Spanish politician, trade unionist, activist and writer who participated in the founding of the Communist Party of Spain.

Acevedo began working as a typographer's apprentice at thirteen in Madrid, where he had moved with his family three years before. In 1898, he moved to Santander, where he became president of the Socialist Federation. Because he had a major role within the party, highlighted by his debate as a socialist representative against anarchist Emilio Carral, he was called upon by the socialists of Bilbao to be the editor of the newspaper La Lucha de Clases (Spanish: The Class Struggle). He was imprisoned several times because of his articles.

In 1914, he returned to Asturias, and edited La Aurora Social. He was arrested in 1917 for his participation in the revolutionary strike of that year. In 1921, as a delegate of the Asturian Socialist Federation, he participated in the Socialist Congress of Madrid. There, along with other supporters of the Third International, he founded the Communist Party of Spain.

After founding the publication La Aurora Roja and traveling to Russia as a representative of Spain's Communist Party in the congresses of the Third International, he gave various lectures throughout Spain. These experiences led to his book Impresiones de un viaje a Rusia (Spanish: Impressions of a Trip to Russia), published in Oviedo in 1923. He also published a novel in 1930 called Los topos, in which he criticized Manuel Llaneza, a socialist mining leader.

With the rise to power of Miguel Primo de Rivera, he was jailed for a few months and returned to Madrid.

After the Spanish Civil War, he went into exile in the Soviet Union. There, he held the position of president of the Spanish section of the International Red Aid until he died in 1952.
