= Lyubov Radchenko =

Belarusian revolutionary socialist (1871–1962)

- Любовь Радченко
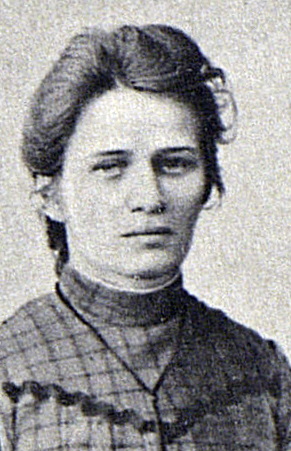
- Radchenko in 1906
- Born: Lyubov Nikolaevna Baranskaya; 1871; Mogilev, Russian Empire
- Died: 1962 (aged 90–91); Soviet Union
- Other name: Pasha
- Political party: Russian Social Democratic Labour Party (Mensheviks)
- Spouse: Stepan Radchenko

Lyubov Nikolaevna Radchenko (née Baranskaya; Russian: Любовь Николаевна Радченко; 1871–1962) was a Belarusian revolutionary socialist. She was affiliated with a Marxist group led by Julius Martov, which later merged into the Russian Social Democratic Labour Party (RSDLP). She oversaw the operations of the party's newspaper Iskra until the party split, upon which she joined the Mensheviks. She was arrested and exiled during the Stalinist era, for which she was posthumously rehabilitated.

== Biography ==
Lyubov Nikolaevna Baranskaya was born in 1871. While still young, she became a political activist and joined Narodnik circles in Tomsk and Saint Petersburg.

She came under the influence of the Russian Marxist Georgi Plekhanov. In 1892, she joined a Marxist reading group led by Julius Martov, which later became the Saint Petersburg branch of the Emancipation of Labour. Radchenko became a close friend of Martov and her first name inspired the initial "L" in his pseudonym "L.M." According to Martov's sister Lydia Dan, the two became entangled in a "complex personal relationship". She later married fellow socialist Stepan Radchenko, with whom she had a daughter. Radchenko had previously written in her diary that it had been her "duty" as a revolutionary socialist to not become "tied down by a family".

By the time of the First Congress of the Russian Social Democratic Labour Party (RSDLP), Radchenko was part of a small circle which consisted of only herself, her husband, Ivan Sammer and Nadezhda Krupskaya. Radchenko and her husband maintained the small group while Krupskaya was imprisoned, before moving to Pskov with her family, where she took the pseudonym "Pasha". In 1900, Radchenko hosted a conference of the League of Struggle for the Emancipation of the Working Class at her apartment in Pskov, which was attended by Martov, Alexander Potresov and Vladimir Lenin. Martov's circle then settled in the Ukrainian city of Poltava, which became the headquarters of their newspaper Iskra. Radchenko took over the day-to-day operations of the paper after Martov was arrested and expelled from the country. Radchenko was one of five women, out of twelve contributors, who worked on the publication. She continued working for the paper even after her husband quit the publication.

By 1903, the RSDLP had been effectively repressed, with many of its members being arrested. Radchenko herself managed to escape arrest and oversaw the revival of the RSDLP, which soon returned to its political activities. Radchenko attended the Second Congress of the RSDLP, where a split opened up between the editorial board of Iskra; the party soon broke into Bolshevik and Menshevik factions. Radchenko joined the Mensheviks, and by 1910, she was serving on the Menshevik party's central committee and contributing to its newspaper. She went on to oversee the operations of the party newspaper Luch.

After the Russian Revolution of 1917, Radchenko withdrew from political activism and went to work as a statistician. On 3 December 1926, she was arrested on charges of Menshevism. On 28 January 1927, the OGPU sentenced her to three years of internal exile in Voronezh. After serving her sentence, in December 1930, the OGPU deprived her of her right to reside in Moscow, Leningrad or Ukraine for another three years. She died in 1962.

== Bibliography ==
- Gorbunov, Yurii Alekseevich. "РАДЧЕНКО, Любовь Николаевна" [Radchenko, Lyubov Nikolaevna]. Писательницы России: материалы для биобиблиографического словаря (in Russian). Sverdlovsk Oblast Universal Scientific Library.
- Krupskaya, Nadezhda (1970) [1930]. Reminiscences of Lenin. Translated by Isaacs, Bernard. International Publishers.
- Makarova, V.; Khristoforova, V., eds. (2005). Высылка вместо расстрела. Депортация интеллигенции в документах ВЧК-ГПУ. 1921-1923 [Exile Instead of Execution: Deportation of the Intelligentsia in the Documents of the Cheka-GPU, 1921–1923] (in Russian). Moscow: Ruskyy Put. p. 480. ISBN 9785858871750. OCLC 61768056.
- Savel'ev, P. Iu.; Tiutiukin, S. V. (2006). "Iulii Osipovich Martov (1873–1923): The Man and the Politician". Russian Studies in History. 45 (1): 6–92. doi:10.2753/RSH1061-1983450101.
- Turton, Katy (2018). Family Networks and the Russian Revolutionary Movement, 1870–1940. Palgrave Macmillan. ISBN 978-0-230-39307-3.
- Young, James Peter (2008). Bolshevik Wives: A Study of Soviet Elite Society (PhD). Sydney University. OCLC 271754744.
