= Leo Deutsch =

Russian Marxist revolutionary (1855–1941)

- Лев Дейч
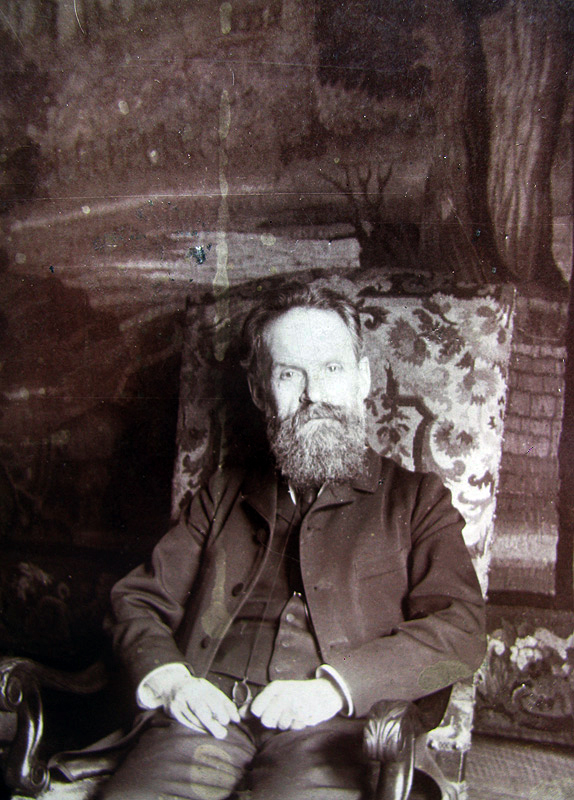
- Born: September 26, 1855; Tulchin, Podolia Governorate, Russian Empire
- Died: August 5, 1941 (aged 85); Moscow, Russian SFSR, Soviet Union

Lev Grigorievich Deutsch (Russian: Лев Григорьевич Дейч, romanized: Lev Grigoryevich Deych; September 26, 1855 – August 5, 1941), also known as Leo Deutsch, was a Russian Marxist revolutionary and one of four founding members of Russia's Marxist Organisation, the precursor of the Russian Social Democratic Labour Party.

== Biography ==
=== Early life and political activities ===
Lev Grigorievich Deutsch was born September 25, 1855, in Tulchin, in the Podolia Governorate of the Russian Empire (today Tulchyn, Ukraine), the son of a Jewish merchant father and a peasant mother. At the age of 19, he joined a Narodnik group in Kiev, and took part in the 'to the people' movement, in which young radicals dressed as peasants, and went to villages to spread socialist ideas. He avoided arrest, unlike many of the participants, but returned, disillusioned in the summer of 1875 and volunteered to join the infantry, hoping to be sent to the Balkans to fight the Turks, but in February 1876, he was implicated in helping a revolutionary named Semyon Lurie, one of the defendants at the Trial of the 193 to escape from Kiev prison, and deserted, to avoid a court martial. He joined an illegal group known as the Kiev buntari.

In June 1876, Deutsch was living illegally in Elisavetgrad when a former student named Gorinovich sought to join his group. Gorinovich had been arrested for taking part in the 'to the people' movement in 1874, but was released. Deutsch believed that he had gained his release by denouncing others, and was an active police spy, and resolved to kill him. He and a fellow revolutionary, V.A.Malinka, persuaded Gorinovich to join them on a trip to Odessa, and on the way attacked him and left him for dead, though he recovered and named his attackers. Malinka was hanged for his part in attack in December 1878. This was the first act of violence committed by Russian revolutionaries during the 1870s, and made Deutsch so notorious that when a young Jewish woman was arrested as one of the conspirators who had assassinated the Tsar Alexander II in 1881, the Russian press wrongly assumed that she was Deutsch's sister.

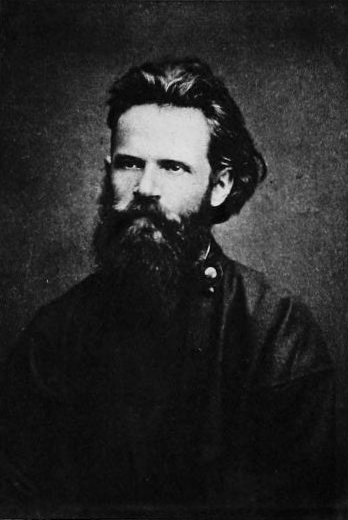
Deutsch in prison uniform

In summer 1877, he was arrested as an accomplice of Yakov Stefanovich in the Chigirin Affair and held in Kiev prison, but both men escaped in May 1878 after a fellow revolutionary, Mikhail Frolenko, had obtained a post as a prison warden and let them out one night. Deutsch escaped to Europe, but returned to St Petersburg, and – despite his past record – was a founding member of Chornyi peredel (Black Repartition), rather than the more violent and conspiratorial People's Will, who carried out the assassination of the Tsar.

=== Conversion to Marxism ===
In 1880 Deutsch and other leaders of the Black Repartition group, including George Plekhanov, Vera Zasulich and Pavel Axelrod emigrated to Geneva. Abroad, Plekhanov studied the works of Karl Marx, and persuaded the other three to join him in 1883 in creating the Marxist Emancipation of Labour. All of Russia's Marxist parties, including the Communist Party, traced their lineage from this group. As its most experienced illegal operator, Deutsch was put in charge of smuggling Marxist literature into Russia, but was arrested in Germany in March 1884.

=== Arrest and exile ===
It was extremely rare for Russian revolutionaries to be extradited by any European government, but Deutsch was treated as a common criminal because the attempt to kill Gorinovich, and sent back to St Petersburg in a cattle truck. At this trial, he freely admitted the offence, but was denied the right to explain his reasons for it, and was sentenced to 13 years and four months in prison. In 1890, he was deported to the Kara region of Siberia, where he shared a cell with other political revolutionaries. According to his account, when Deutsch told them that he had become a Marxist — an ideology then little known outside Germany: "Had I announced myself a follower of the prophet Mohammed, they could scarcely have been more surprised."

=== Return to political activity ===
In 1900, Deutsch made a dramatic escape from Siberia, through Japan, the US, Liverpool, London, and Paris, to rejoin the Emancipation of Labour League in Switzerland in November 1901. His three former comrades there had since joined Vladimir Lenin, Julius Martov, and Alexander Potresov on the six-member editorial board of the newspaper Iskra, which was riven by rivalry between the generations. Plekhanov hoped that Deutsch would take over the task of smuggling the paper into Russia from Lenin, putting the older revolutionaries back in control of the project, but his long imprisonment had taken too much of a toll for him to assume the task. Deutsch was present as an observer at the second congress of the Russian Social Democratic Labour Party in 1903 when it split into its Bolshevik and Menshevik factions. He sided the Mensheviks - Martov, Axelrod, Zasulich, Leon Trotsky et al. Lenin's widow recalled incident involving Deutsch, and a Bolshevik named Vladimir Noskov, as the conference was ending: "Deutsch was angrily reprimanding 'Glebov' (Noskov) about something. The latter raised his head and with gleaming eyes said bitterly: 'You just keep your mouth shut, you old dodderer!'"

During the 1905 Revolution Deutsch returned to Russia but was arrested and imprisoned. However, on the way to Siberia he escaped and made his way to London, starting a period of foreign exile which lasted until the February 1917 Russian Revolution.

=== Exile and return ===
From October 1915 to September 1916, Deutsch edited a monthly newspaper in New York City called Svobodnoe Slovo ("Free Word").

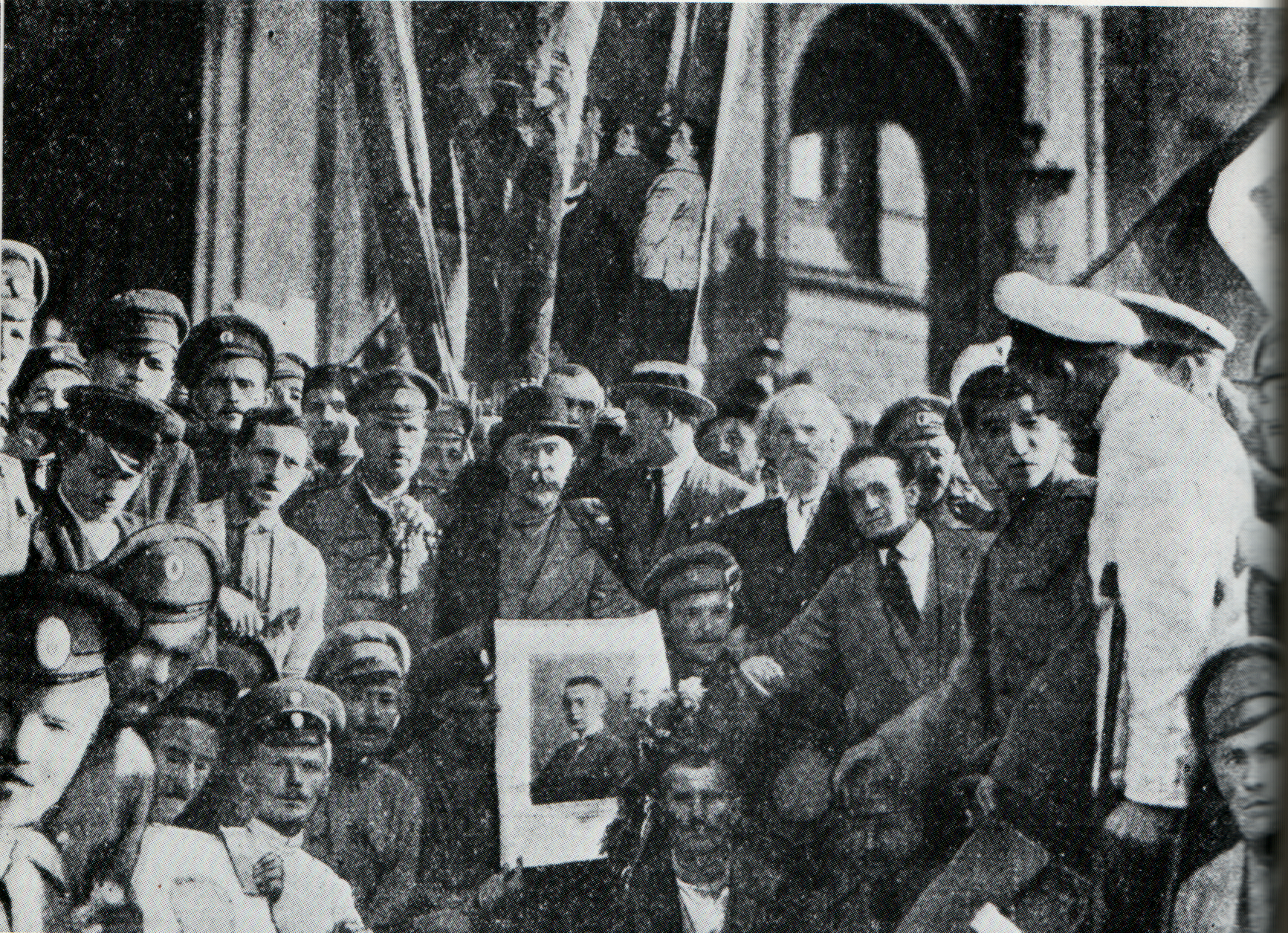
Deutsch and Plekhanov leading the demonstration in favor of the June military offensive in front of the Defense Ministry in Petrograd, June 1917

In 1917, Deutsch returned to Petrograd and joined George Plekhanov in editing Edinstvo ("Unity"). He also wrote his memoirs and edited a volume of documents associated with the Emancipation of Labour group. Deutsch adopted a "defencist" position during the rule of the Provisional Government and supported Russia's war efforts.

He did not support the October Revolution which he considered to be a "Bolshevik adventure". After the death of Plekhanov, Deutsch withdrew from political activity. From 1928 he was a personal pensioner and published books about the history of the revolutionary movement and memoirs.

Deutsch died on August 5, 1941, and was buried at the Novodevichy Cemetery.

== Personal life ==
Deutsch never married, though his memoirs show that he had very friendly and affectionate relations with the wives of other revolutionaries, such as Pavel Axelrod. It is probable that he was gay, though he may not have been actively homosexual. During his imprisonment exile in Kara, he and Yakov Stefanovitch – the only exile ready to listen sympathetically to Deutsch's reasons for converting to Marxism – successfully appealed to the governor to be allowed to share a room away from other political exiles. One of their contemporaries, Sergei Kravchinsky, alias Stepnyak, writing while at a time when both men were in Europe, after their escape from Kiev prison, claimed that were "never separated except when absolutely compelled" adding, "and then they write long letters to each other every day, which they jealously keep, showing them to no one, affording thus a subject of everlasting ridicule among their friends."

In London, in 1903, Deutsch, who was then aged 47, became very attached to 23-year-old Leon Trotsky, whom he never referred to by name, but only as 'youth' or 'our Benjamin'. He successfully lobbied the editors of Iskra to allow Trotsky to stay in Europe, rather than be assigned to illegal work in Russia, with a high risk that he would be arrested. In his memoirs, Trotsky recorded that Deutsch "treated me very kindly" and "stood up for me" and that they were "bound by genuine friendship" but that he "never had and never could have any political influence over me."

== Sources ==
- Leopold H. Haimson. The Making of Three Russian Revolutionaries, Cambridge University Press, 1987; p. 472, note 6.
- Spartacus Educational – History on Russian Revolutionaries
