= Pavel Axelrod =

Russian Marxist theorist and revolutionary (1850–1928)

- Павел Аксельрод
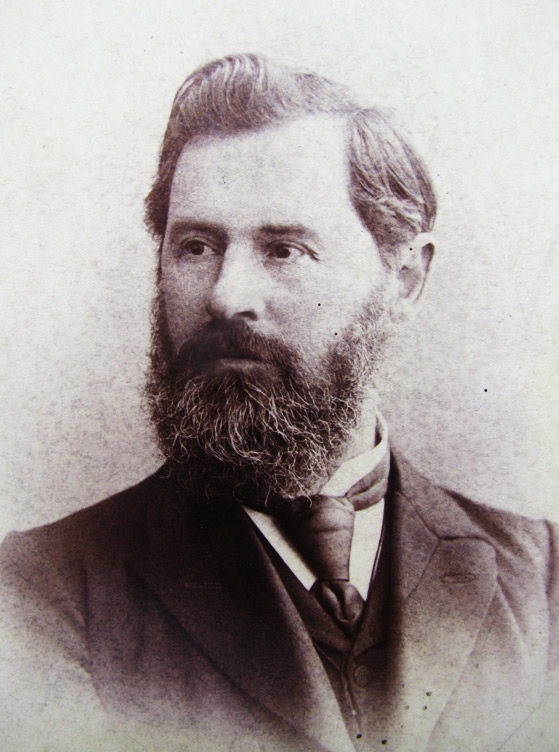
- Axelrod c. 1900s
- Born: Pinchus Boruch; 25 August 1850; Pochep, Russia
- Died: 16 April 1928 (aged 77); Berlin, Prussia
- Education: Kiev University
- Political party: Land and Liberty; Emancipation of Labour; RSDLP
- Spouse: Nadezhda Ivanovna Kaminer (m. 1875–1906)
- Children: 3

Pavel Borisovich Axelrod (Russian: Па́вел Бори́сович Аксельро́д; 25 August 1850 – 16 April 1928) was a Russian Marxist theorist, revolutionary, and a leader of the Mensheviks. Originally a follower of the anarchist Mikhail Bakunin, he converted to Marxism in the early 1880s and became a co-founder, alongside Georgy Plekhanov, of the first Russian Marxist organization, the Emancipation of Labour group, in 1883.

Following the 1903 split in the Russian Social Democratic Labour Party (RSDLP), Axelrod emerged as the foremost ideologist of the Menshevik faction. He formulated the main tenets of Menshevism, arguing for the creation of a broad-based, mass workers' party in contrast to Vladimir Lenin's concept of a narrow, centralized vanguard party. He emphasized the importance of the proletariat's political self-activity (samodeiatel'nost) and insisted that the party must follow, not dictate to, the working class.

During the 1905 Russian Revolution, he advocated for a workers' congress to build a non-sectarian political party for the proletariat. After the Bolshevik seizure of power in 1917, which he regarded as a counter-revolutionary coup, he spent his final years in exile campaigning to alert international socialists to the despotic nature of the Soviet regime. Although his political strategies ultimately failed, he is remembered for his consistent dedication to a democratic vision of socialism and has been called the "conscience" of Russian Social Democracy.

== Early life and revolutionary beginnings ==
Pavel Axelrod was born Pinchus Boruch (Russian: Пи́нхус Бо́рух) on 25 August 1850 in a village near the town of Pochep, in the Chernigov Governorate of the Russian Empire. He was the son of a poor, illiterate Jewish innkeeper. The family lived in poverty, frequently moving, and for a time resided in a poorhouse in Shklov run by the local Jewish community. Axelrod's formal education began in an unusual way: to meet a government quota for Jewish students in state schools, the Jewish community of Shklov selected him and a few other poor children to be enrolled, providing them with food and clothing.

Displaying exceptional persistence and intellectual curiosity, Axelrod went on to study at the gymnasium in Mogilev, enduring great hardship to pursue his education. During his time there, he was introduced to the works of Russian and Western European thinkers, lost his religious faith, and developed a reformist zeal. He became a proponent of the Jewish Enlightenment, aiming to introduce Russian culture to Jewish youth and to combat traditionalism. In 1871, after a personal crisis and influenced by the writings of Ferdinand Lassalle and the German novelist Karl Gutzkow, he decided to dedicate his life to social revolution.

Axelrod became active in the revolutionary circles of Kiev, where he worked as a propagandist among the city's artisans. He initially embraced the anarchist ideas of Mikhail Bakunin, which were popular among radicals in the 1870s. Bakuninism's call for immediate, destructive action against the state appealed to his romantic idealism and desire for self-sacrifice more than the gradualist approach of the other major populist theorist, Pyotr Lavrov. However, unlike many of his fellow populists, Axelrod never felt the need to shed a lonely intellectual identity to "fuse" with the masses; having risen from the working people, he felt a "filial duty" to help them achieve emancipation from ignorance and servitude through their own independent initiative (samodeyatelnost). In September 1874, facing increasing police repression, he emigrated from Russia and settled in Berlin.

== Emigration and turn to Marxism ==
In Berlin, Axelrod was profoundly impressed by the German Social Democratic movement. Attending workers' meetings, he was astonished by the political maturity, discipline, and freedom of expression of the German workers. He contrasted their confident defiance of authority with the servility he had witnessed among the Russian masses, a memory he connected to his own father's "fright at the sight of a passing policeman". This experience marked the beginning of his lifelong interest in the Western European labor movement and gave his radicalism a distinctly Western orientation. During this time, he was briefly sheltered by Eduard Bernstein, then a young revolutionary, beginning a long and complex relationship. He was soon joined by his fiancée, Nadezhda Kaminer, whom he married in Geneva in 1875.

Throughout the late 1870s, Axelrod remained an active Bakuninist in the émigré community in Switzerland. He was involved in editing the revolutionary journal Obshchina (The Commune) and participated in various émigré political intrigues, including the bizarre Chigirin affair. His writings for Obshchina show his criticism of the state-oriented socialism of the German party and his advocacy for a decentralized, "bottom-up" social organization based on a "free federation of local groups". At the same time, he began to articulate the need for a unified "popular party" in Russia that would organize the masses and avoid the pitfalls of both Jacobin conspiracy and rudderless populism. In 1879, he briefly returned to Russia to organize workers in Odessa, founding the Southern Union of Russian Workers. The program he drafted for the union was eclectic, combining anarchist ultimate goals with immediate political demands for civil liberties, a clear departure from Bakuninist orthodoxy. Following the split of the Zemlya i Volya (Land and Liberty) party, he sided with the Chyorny Peredel (Black Repartition) faction, which opposed the turn to terrorism advocated by Narodnaya Volya (People's Will). The protest against Narodnaya Volya's elitist revision of populist doctrine was articulated by Axelrod and Plekhanov, who argued that any revolutionary effort that bypassed the masses was futile.

Axelrod's disillusionment with the anarchist movement's ineffectiveness, combined with his intensive study of European socialist parties and the ideological chaos in Russia, gradually led him away from Bakuninism. His conversion to Marxism was a gradual process, driven less by an embrace of abstract theory and more by a "rising response to the accumulating evidence of immediate experience". By 1882, he and Georgy Plekhanov, his close colleague in the Chyorny Peredel group, had both independently converted to Marxism. They were particularly moved by Karl Marx's preface to A Contribution to the Critique of Political Economy, with its vision of humanity's "fully conscious and truly historical existence" after the fall of capitalism. In 1883, Axelrod, Plekhanov, Vera Zasulich, and Leo Deutsch founded the first Russian Marxist organization, the Emancipation of Labour group (Gruppa Osvobozhdenie Truda, or GEL).

== Emancipation of Labour group (1883–1894) ==
Founders of the Emancipation of Labour group; Axelrod at bottom right

The first decade of the Emancipation of Labour group's existence, a period Axelrod later called the "solitary years," was marked by intense personal hardship and political frustration. After resigning from the journal Vol'noe Slovo in 1882, he lost his only steady source of income. With a growing family to support, he faced severe poverty. In 1884, suffering from what was likely depression, his health collapsed. He recovered after his wife began producing and selling kefir, a fermented milk drink. The small business provided the family with a meager subsistence for over two decades but consumed much of his time and energy, causing him moral torment as it forced him to act as a "capitalist".

The GEL struggled to gain support both in Russia and among the émigré community, which remained largely sympathetic to the more activist Narodnaya Volya. The group was small and its resources pitiful. After the arrest of Leo Deutsch in 1884, Axelrod took on much of the group's administrative burden, a task for which he was not temperamentally suited but which placed him at the center of negotiations with other revolutionary organizations. Despite these difficulties, the GEL laid the theoretical foundations of Russian Marxism. While Plekhanov produced the major theoretical works, such as Socialism and Political Struggle (1883) and Our Differences (1885), Axelrod focused on practical and organizational questions. In 1885, he wrote The Workers' Movement and Social Democracy, a handbook designed for the "workers' intelligentsia" which summarized the GEL's beliefs in simple, accessible language. Axelrod and Plekhanov's early writings established the "two-stage" model of revolution, arguing that Russia would have to pass through a "bourgeois" revolution to overthrow the autocracy before a socialist revolution could occur.

During these years, Axelrod's main contribution was his insistence on the need to create an independent, politically conscious working class in Russia. He developed the concept of a "workers' intelligentsia"—a stratum of advanced workers educated in socialist doctrine who could then lead the broader masses. He maintained close friendships with German socialist leaders, particularly Karl Kautsky, who became a lifelong correspondent and a crucial link to the European socialist movement.

== Rise of Menshevism (1895–1905) ==
The mid-1890s marked a new phase for Russian Marxism, as the movement began to gain adherents inside Russia, particularly in St. Petersburg. In 1895, Axelrod helped arrange for the young Vladimir Lenin's visit to Switzerland, where they agreed that Axelrod would edit a new journal for workers, Rabotnik (The Worker), to be supplied with material by the St. Petersburg Marxists. This expansion, however, also brought turbulence. A new tendency, known as "Economism", emerged, which argued that socialists should focus on the workers' immediate economic struggles rather than on political agitation against the autocracy. Axelrod became the leading opponent of Economism from abroad, seeing it as a dangerous deviation that would subordinate the socialist movement to a narrow trade-unionist perspective. In two major works, The Historical Situation and the Reciprocal Relations between Liberals and Social Democrats in Russia and On the Question of the Contemporary Tasks and Tactics of Russian Social Democrats (both 1898), he formulated the orthodox Marxist response. He argued that in autocratic Russia, the proletariat's primary task was to lead an "all-national" struggle for a constitutional regime, in alliance with progressive liberal elements, as a necessary precondition for any future socialist transformation.

The struggle against Economism led to the founding of the newspaper Iskra (The Spark) in 1900, with an editorial board that included Axelrod, Plekhanov, Zasulich, Vladimir Lenin, Julius Martov, and Alexander Potresov. The unity of the Iskra editors was short-lived. At the 2nd Congress of the Russian Social Democratic Labour Party in 1903, a dispute over the definition of a party member in the party statutes led to a split between two factions, which became known as the Bolsheviks (majority) and the Mensheviks (minority). Although he and Martov did not initially appreciate the full implications of Lenin's organizational ideas, they sensed during the congress that Lenin intended to chart a "radically new course" for the party and harbored ambitions for personal predominance. Lenin proposed a narrow definition, restricting membership to those who personally participated in a party organization. Martov, supported by Axelrod, advocated a broader definition that would include anyone who provided regular personal assistance under the direction of a party organization.

Axelrod saw the dispute as a fundamental conflict over the nature of the party. He and Martov argued that the RSDLP was intended to be a class party of the proletariat, and that while a conspiratorial network was necessary under conditions of political terror, it should be "surrounded by a wider party" that included the broad mass of conscious workers. He feared that Lenin's model was a "conspiratorial organization" of professional revolutionaries that would lump together the concepts of "party" and "organization," effectively excluding the broad mass of workers. Though Martov's formulation initially won a majority, Lenin's faction secured control of the party's central organs after the withdrawal of several delegates, leading to the formal split.

In the aftermath of the congress, Axelrod became the chief ideologist of the Menshevik faction. In a seminal two-part article in Iskra in late 1903 and early 1904, he articulated the core principles of Menshevism. He diagnosed the party's crisis as a contradiction between its socialist aims and its organizational structure, which had transformed activists into "screws and wheels" of a centralized apparatus run by the intelligentsia. He called for a "revolutionizing" of party practices to encourage the political self-activity (samodeiatel'nost) of the proletariat, arguing that only through direct involvement in political life could the working class develop the consciousness needed for its historic mission. This article, which appeared as a "revelation" to many Marxists, clarified the schism not as a simple power struggle but as a conflict between two diametrically opposed conceptions of a Marxist party: a hierarchical party controlled from above versus a mass party controlled from below. This laid the foundation for the Menshevik program and solidified Axelrod's status as an independent leader.

== 1905 Revolution and its aftermath ==
The 1905 Russian Revolution gave Axelrod an opportunity to apply his tactical ideas. As political ferment grew, he proposed a "zemstvo campaign", urging Social Democrats to organize workers to demonstrate at the meetings of liberal zemstvo assemblies to push them toward a more radical opposition to the autocracy. This was an application of his theory of proletarian "hegemony"—the idea that the working class should act as the vanguard in the bourgeois-democratic revolution, prodding other oppositional forces into action. His strategy involved having hand-picked workers make speeches at political banquets to push the liberal circles further to the left.

His most significant proposal of the period was for the convocation of a national "workers' congress" (rabochii s'ezd). This non-party congress, composed of elected delegates from the working class, would formulate its own political and economic demands and create an authentic, broad-based proletarian political party. This, he believed, was the only way to overcome the domination of the party by the intellectual elite and truly "Europeanize" the Russian labor movement. The idea became a cornerstone of Menshevik agitation from 1905 to 1907 and a major point of contention with the Bolsheviks, who denounced it as harmful to the existing party structure.

At the Fourth (Unity) Congress in Stockholm in 1906, where the Mensheviks held a majority, Axelrod delivered the main address on tactics. He chided both factions for their errors during the revolution—the Bolsheviks for their "putschist-conspiratorial" methods and the Mensheviks for having at times abandoned his tactical line. He argued that the party must prepare for a coalition with the middle class to fight against the autocracy and must participate in the Duma to use it as a "lever" for progress.

After the defeat of the revolution and the onset of the Stolypin reaction, the Social Democratic movement was decimated. Axelrod was stunned by the Bolsheviks' continued use of "expropriations" (armed robberies) and their involvement in counterfeiting, asking in 1907, "How can we remain with them in one party?" In the ensuing years, a new ideological conflict arose over "liquidationism". Lenin accused a segment of the Mensheviks of wanting to "liquidate" the illegal underground party in favor of purely legal work. Axelrod and other Mensheviks, such as Theodore Dan and Alexander Potresov, countered that they were not abandoning the illegal party but were adapting its work to the new reality by focusing on building a presence in legal institutions like trade unions, cooperatives, and the Duma. The dispute, which was fundamentally a continuation of the old debate over party organization, led to a final, irreparable break between the factions at the Bolshevik-led Prague Conference in 1912, where the Mensheviks were formally expelled.

== World War I and 1917 Revolution ==
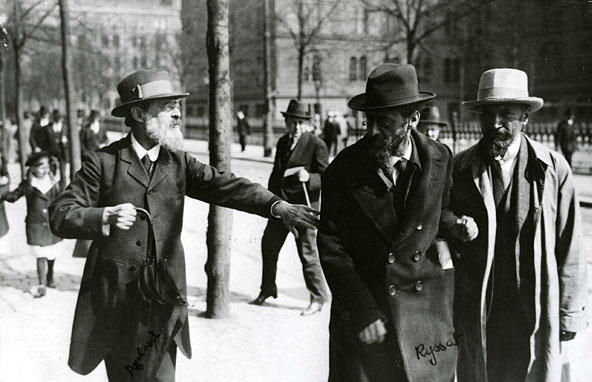
Menshevik leaders, May 1917. Left to right: Axelrod, Julius Martov, and Alexander Martinov.

The outbreak of World War I in 1914 shattered the Second International and created new divisions within Russian Social Democracy. Axelrod adopted a centrist, internationalist position. He opposed the war as an imperialist conflict but refused to advocate for Russia's defeat, as Lenin did. He argued that the primary task of socialists was to restore the International and wage a common campaign for a democratic peace without annexations or indemnities. He participated in the Zimmerwald movement of anti-war socialists but opposed the radical Zimmerwald Left, led by Lenin, which called for a complete break with the Second International and the transformation of the imperialist war into a civil war.

Axelrod returned to Russia in May 1917, after the February Revolution. He urged the Menshevik-dominated Petrograd Soviet to lead an international peace campaign but warned against a separate peace with Germany, which he believed would be a betrayal of the Allied democracies and would harm the Russian Revolution. While supporting the Russian Provisional Government, he argued that the proletariat must maintain its political independence and constantly push the bourgeois government toward more radical democratic reforms. His influence on the day-to-day policies of the Mensheviks was limited, however, as his talent lay in developing broad tactical positions rather than in the rapid political maneuvering required by the tumultuous events of 1917.

== Exile and "conscience of the party" ==
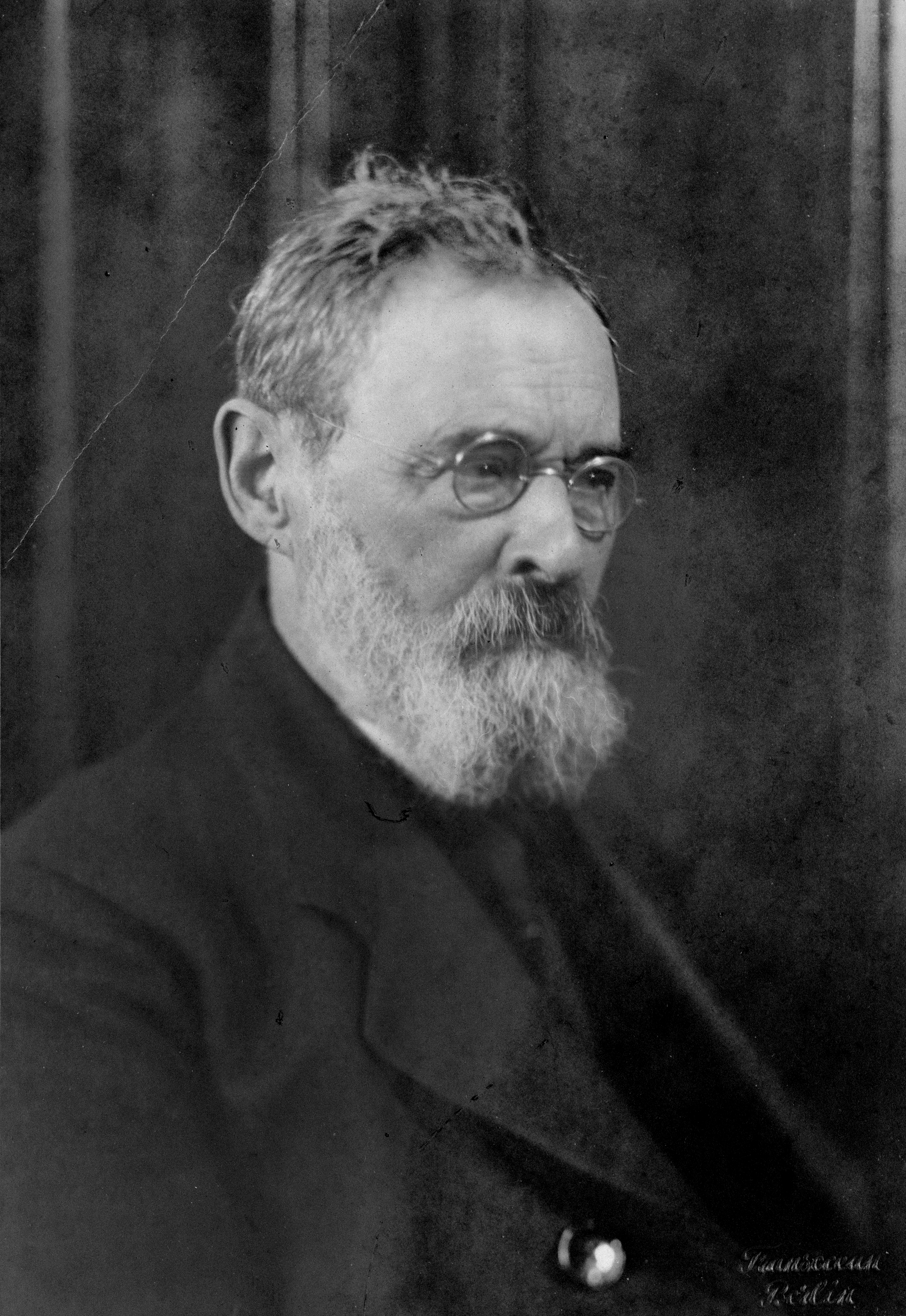
Axelrod c. 1920s

Axelrod left Russia in August 1917 to attend a socialist conference in Stockholm and never returned. He was horrified by the Bolshevik seizure of power in November 1917, which he considered a "historical crime without parallel in modern history" and a "gruesome counterrevolution." He argued that the Bolsheviks, by seizing power in a country unripe for socialism and by suppressing democratic institutions, had committed a profound betrayal of Marxism. He predicted that "history would avenge itself on those who had violated its rules" and that the Bolshevik regime would be short-lived.

From 1918 until his death, Axelrod dedicated himself to a crusade to alert Western socialists to the true nature of the Bolshevik regime. He edited journals in Stockholm and campaigned relentlessly for the Socialist International to send a commission of inquiry to Russia to investigate the Bolsheviks' policies of terror and repression. He was deeply disappointed by the reluctance of many European socialists to condemn the Bolsheviks, an attitude he attributed to their loss of faith in democratic principles. He was also pained by the ideological shift of the Mensheviks inside Russia, who, under Martov's leadership, moved toward a position of critical support for the Soviet regime, viewing it as a historically necessary, if distorted, phase of the proletarian revolution. This led to an ideological rupture with the party he had co-founded; in a public letter to Martov in 1920, Axelrod condemned the Menshevik leadership's willingness to see the Bolshevik dictatorship as a "lesser evil" than counter-revolution, arguing that his own view assigned decisive importance to traditional, liberal democracy, without which socialism was impossible.

Axelrod's last years were spent in Berlin, in sickness, poverty, and political isolation. He died on 16 April 1928.

== Legacy ==
Pavel Axelrod's primary legacy lies in his role as the chief architect of Menshevik ideology. More than any other figure, he defined the core tenets that distinguished Menshevism from Bolshevism. His political thought was characterized by a consistent and unwavering commitment to a democratic, mass-based socialist movement. He believed that the liberation of the working class could only be achieved by the working class itself, through its own conscious and independent political activity. This stood in stark contrast to Lenin's elitist conception of a vanguard party that would lead the proletariat. For Axelrod, the development of proletarian "consciousness and activism came first in his hierarchy of values—the revolution, second". He later characterized Lenin's ideology as being, in essence, an expression of the intelligentsia's "bourgeois radicalism" rather than a consistent ideology of the working classes.

Unlike many of his fellow revolutionaries, such as Lenin and Plekhanov, Axelrod had never felt the deep alienation from Russian society that drove them; his identification with the common people was direct and lifelong. His confidence in the eventual triumph of socialism was born not out of a belief in abstract historical laws, but out of a deep faith in the creative potential of the proletariat itself. While his attempt to apply the model of Western European Social Democracy to the conditions of a backward, autocratic state ultimately proved unworkable, his insistence on the inseparability of socialism and democracy, his emphasis on the moral dimension of politics, and his profound distrust of any form of revolutionary dictatorship made him, in the words of one observer, the "conscience of the party". After 1917, as the leader of the Mensheviks, he "worked his way back to an espousal of consistent organizational democracy and workers' initiative, which betrayed their unmistakable ideological kinship to the formerly despised 'Economists'".
