= Iskra =

Political newspaper of Russian socialist emigrants

- "Из искры возгорится пламя" ("From a spark a flame will flare up")
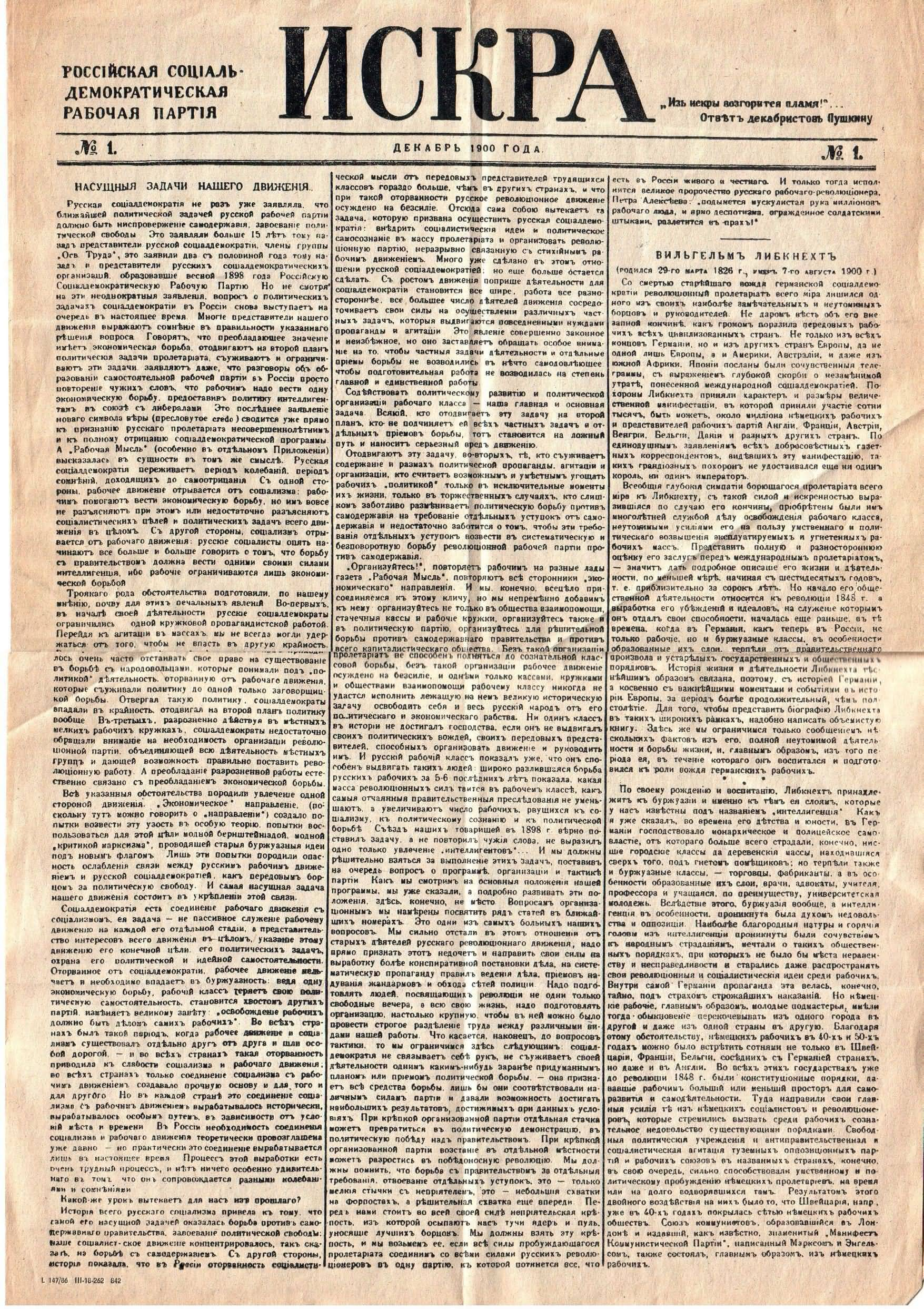
- The first issue of Iskra
- Founders: Vladimir Lenin (Vladimir Ilyich Ulyanov); Savva Morozov; Dmitri Ilyich Ulyanov; Georgi Plekhanov; Vera Zasulich; Pavel Axelrod (Pinchas Borutsch); Julius Martov (Ilija Cederbaum); Aleksandr Potresov
- Staff writers: Vladimir Lenin (Vladimir Ilyich Ulyanov); Dmitri Ilyich Ulyanov, his younger brother; Georgi Plekhanov; Vera Zasulich; Pavel Axelrod (Pinchas Borutsch); Julius Martov (Ilija Cederbaum); Aleksandr Potresov
- Founded: 1900
- Ceased publication: 1905
- Political alignment: Russian Social Democratic Labour Party
- Language: Russian
- Circulation: 8,000

Iskra (Russian: Искра, IPA: [ˈiskrə], the Spark) was a fortnightly political newspaper of Russian socialist emigrants established as the official organ of the Russian Social Democratic Labour Party (RSDLP).

== History ==
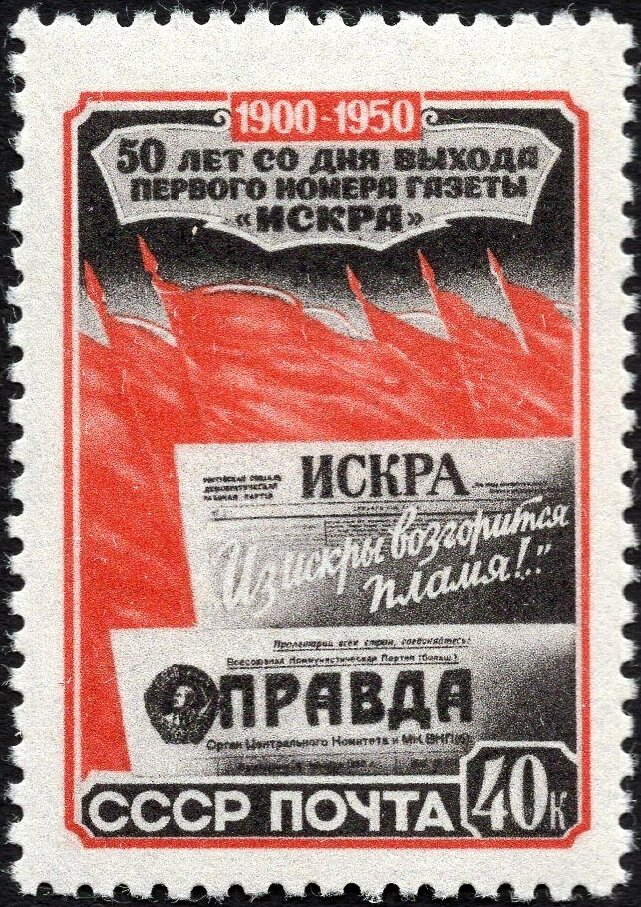
1950 Soviet postage stamp marking the 50th anniversary of the first issue of Iskra, and claiming Pravda as its continuation

Iskra was published in exile and then smuggled into Russia. Initially, it was managed by Vladimir Lenin, moving as he moved. The first edition was published in Leipzig, Germany, on 1 December 1900 (other sources say 11 December). Other editions were published in Munich (1900–1902) and Geneva from 1903. When Lenin was in London (1902–1903) the newspaper was edited from a small office at 37a Clerkenwell Green, EC1, with Henry Quelch arranging the necessary printworks.

Iskra quickly became the most successful underground Russian newspaper since 1850s. It was smuggled into Russia via Romania, and reprinted on secret presses in Kishinev and the Caucasus. Using the networks created to write for and distribute the paper, Lenin and Julius Martov prepared organisationally for the Second Congress of the RSDLP.

In 1903, following the split of the RSDLP, Chairman Georgi Plekhanov chose to seek reconciliation with dissident party members who had walked out on the vote to reduce the number of seats on the editorial board from six to three. He chose to nominate three members, all Mensheviks. Lenin resigned shortly before the nominations were finalized, leaving Iskra in Menshevik control.

== Political viewpoint ==
Iskra's motto was "Из искры возгорится пламя" (Iz iskry vozgoritsya plamya — "From a spark a flame will flare up") — a line from the reply Alexander Odoevsky wrote to the poem by Alexander Pushkin addressed to the anti-tsar Decembrists imprisoned in Siberia. The editorial line championed the battle for political freedom as well as the cause of socialist revolution. The paper also ran a number of notable polemics against "economists", who argued against political struggle in favour of pure trade union activity for the worker's economic interests, as well as the Socialist Revolutionaries, who advocated terror tactics. In the book What Is to Be Done?, Lenin argues that trade union activity, although being a good starting point for revolution, would only stay at the level of trade-unionist politics and would not be capable, in itself, of challenging the aristocracy or capitalism. Lenin, on the other hand, argues for a vanguard party, made up of professional revolutionaries, to lead the political struggle and raise the average worker to the level of revolutionaries.

As outlined by Lenin in What Is to Be Done?, Iskra took the place of a central project to cohere the RSDLP nationally. As one of the editors, Lenin was "allowed a virtual monopoly over communications with party workers in Russia and could count on the acquiescence of his colleagues in his endeavours to put his organizational program into practice."

== Staff ==
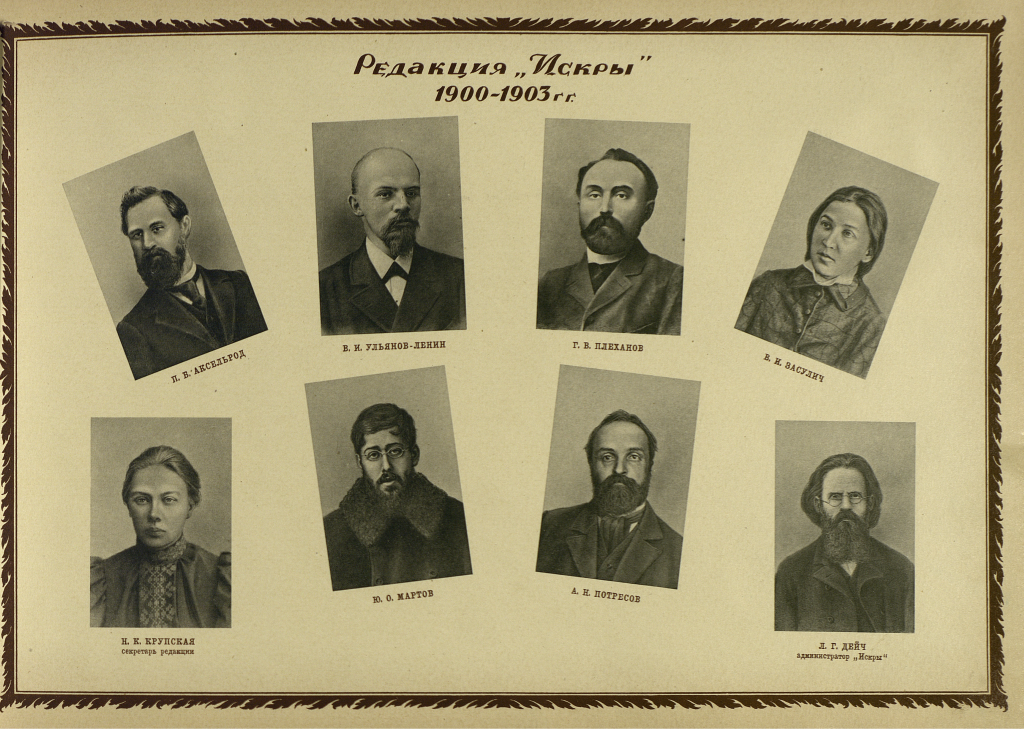
Editorial board of Iskra in 1903

Initial staff members:

- Vladimir Lenin (Vladimir Ilyich Ulyanov)
- Dmitry Ilyich Ulyanov, his younger brother
- Maria Ulyanova, his younger sister
- Georgi Plekhanov
- Vera Zasulich
- Pavel Axelrod (Pinchas Borutsch)
- Julius Martov (Ilija Cederbaum)
- Alexander Potresov
- Lyubov Radchenko
- Zinaida Krzhizhanovskaya
- Lydia Knipovich
- Elena Stasova

Later:

- Leon Trotsky (Lev Davidovich Bronstein)
- Marija Essen

Some of the staff were later involved in the Bolshevik revolution of October 1917.

Iosif Blumenfeld did the printing. Leo Deutsch was the administrator of Iskra but did not share in the editorial work.

Savva Morozov was one of the people who financed the paper.

== See also ==
- Nina Printing House
- Pravda
- Kommunistka
- Zreniye
