= Zreniye =

Zreniye (Russian: Зрение, lit. 'Vision') was a Bolshevik legal weekly newspaper published in St. Petersburg, Russia, during the Second Duma election campaign in 1907, with Lenin participating. Only two issues appeared, containing four articles by Lenin. Both were confiscated by order of the St. Petersburg Press Committee, and publication of the paper was prohibited by the St. Petersburg City Court.
