= Alexander Potresov =

Russian editor and politician

- Александр Потресов
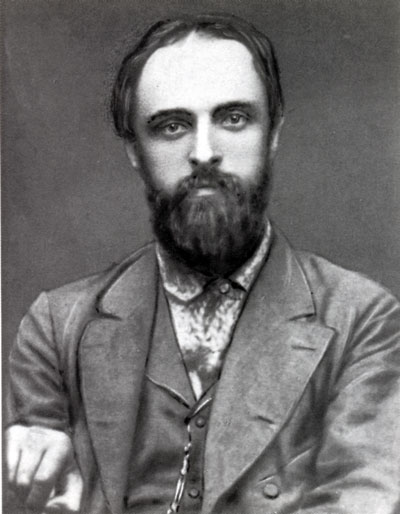
- Born: 31 August [O.S. 19 August] 1869; Moscow, Russian Empire
- Died: June 11, 1934 (aged 64); Paris, French Third Republic
- Political party: Russian Social Democratic Labour Party, Mensheviks

Alexander Nikolayevich Potresov (Russian: Алекса́ндр Никола́евич Потре́сов; August 31, 1869 – July 11, 1934) was a Russian social democratic politician and one of the leaders of the Menshevik faction of the Russian Social Democratic Labour Party. He was one of six original editors of the newspaper Iskra, under the pen name "Starover".

== Life and career ==
=== Early career ===
A. N. Potresov was born in Moscow into a noble family; his father was a Major General. He studied physics, mathematics and law at the University of St. Petersburg. As a student he came into contact with revolutionary groups. In the early 1890s he converted from Narodnism to Marxism and joined the secret Social-Democratic circles of Peter Struve and Julius Martov. In 1892 he contacted the exiled Emancipation of Labour group of George Plekhanov and arranged for some of Plekhanov's writings to be published in Russia legally. The Russian government was at that time more concerned about the revolutionary populism of Narodnaya Volya (The People's Will) than about Plekhanov, whose group was opposed to populism.

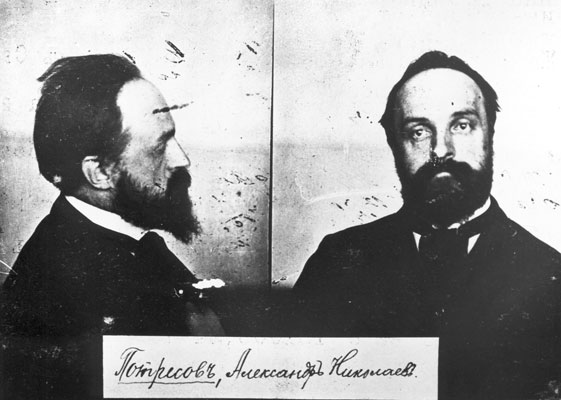
Potresov in a police photo, 1897

In 1896 Potresov helped found the St. Petersburg Union of Struggle for the Emancipation of the Working Class, one of the nuclei of the Russian Social-Democratic Workers' Party (RSDRP). Other members of the St. Petersburg Union included Martov and Vladimir Lenin. In 1897, Potresov was arrested and exiled to Vyatka province. After his release in 1900 he left Russia and lived mostly in Germany, where he had good contacts among the German Social-Democrats and among the Russian exiles. He grew close to Pavel Axelrod and Vera Zasulich.

In 1898, Potresov married his fellow exile, Ekaterina Tulinova.

=== Iskra period ===
Together with Plekhanov, Akselrod, Zasulich, Lenin and Martov, Potresov launched the journal Iskra (The Spark), whose mission it was to defend orthodox Marxism (as Plekhanov understood it) against the various heresies of Economism and Revisionism that were then current among Russian Social-Democrats. In 1898 Potresov helped found the Russian Social-Democratic Workers' Party (RSDRP). However, in 1901-02 Potresov fell seriously ill and could do little editorial work. Lenin proposed to reduce the editorial board to himself, Plekhanov and Martov, discarding the less productive Akselrod, Zasulich and Potresov. This caused some bad blood between Lenin and those he proposed to dismiss. In 1903, when the RSDRP split into Bolsheviks and Mensheviks, Potresov sided with the latter.

By the end of 1903 it was Lenin who had left Iskra, while Potresov was back on the editorial board. He was invaluable to the Mensheviks because of his good contacts to the German Social-Democrats, and was largely responsible for the fact that most SPD leaders tended to sympathise with the Mensheviks (although officially they were studiously neutral). However, tensions soon developed between Potresov and Plekhanov. Plekhanov, who had voted with the Bolsheviks in 1903, was pressing for a reunification of the RSDRP. In this he had the support of the Germans. Potresov, supported by Zasulich, considered co-operation with Lenin impossible. Potresov and Zasulich left the Iskra board.

=== During the Russian Revolutions ===
The Revolution of 1905 brought Potresov back to Russia, where he edited the Menshevik papers Nachalo (Beginning) and Nevskii Golos (New Voice). He also attended the Menshevik's' party congresses in 1906 and 1907. After the defeat of the Revolution of 1905, Potresov sympathised with the so-called 'Liquidators' who wanted to suspend illegal revolutionary work and concentrate on trade union work (legal since 1906) and elections to the Duma. This course was diametrically opposed by Lenin, but it also put him at odds with 'Party Mensheviks' like Martov. Nevertheless, Liquidationism was a strong current among Mensheviks, and Potresov, as editor of the Liquidationist journal Nacha Zariia (Our Charge), was one of its most prominent theoreticians. In addition to his journalism, Potresov wrote historical and sociological essays. He was one of the editors and contributors to the four-volume The Social Movement in Russia in the Early 20th Century (1909–14).

In 1914, Potresov immediately adopted a Defencist position. He was supported by Plekhanov but abandoned by most Mensheviks, even most Menshevik Defencists, who were wary of Potresov's unqualified support for 'war to victory'. Potresov, however, argued that a victory of the Entente over the Central Powers would be a victory of Western democracy over Prussian militarism and would benefit the socialist movement everywhere. He propagated these views in the journal Nache Delo (Our Cause). Potresov was nevertheless highly critical of the government for its incompetent conduct of the war. In 1915 this led to the closing of his journal and his exile from Petrograd. He was, however, allowed to live in Moscow and there continued his journalism. Potresov sought to assist the war effort by joining the Moscow Military Industrial Committee.

In 1917 he welcomed the February Revolution because it got rid of the Tsar's incompetent leadership. But Potresov's demand to continue the war effort at all costs alienated him from most Mensheviks. Even the Revolutionary Defencists who dominated the soviets kept him at arms' length. During preparations for the elections to the Constituent Assembly, Potresov threatened to withdraw from the RSDRP and head a separate list. Potresov vehemently opposed the October Revolution. In 1918 he withdrew from the RSDRP and joined the Union for the Salvation of Russia, a group uniting right-wing Mensheviks, SRs, and Popular Socialists. He later regretted this collaboration.

=== Later life ===
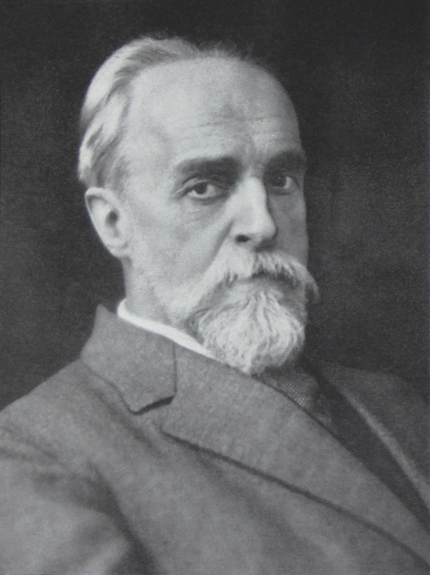
Alexander Potresov in 1925

In 1918 the Bolsheviks arrested Potresov for his involvement in that committee. In 1925 he was permitted to leave Soviet Russia for medical reasons. He lived first in Berlin and then in Paris, battling illness. Potresov viewed the Soviet Union not as a socialist state but as a thoroughly reactionary oligarchy, a point of view that alienated him from most Mensheviks. He contributed regularly to Alexander Kerensky's journal Dni (Days). He expected the imminent collapse of communism and urged all anti-Bolshevik forces to unite.

Potresov died in Paris on July 11, 1934, as a consequence of an operation. He was buried at the Père Lachaise Cemetery.

== Literature ==
- Liebich, A., From the Other Shore: Russian Social-Democracy After 1921. Harvard University Press, 1997.
- Haimson, L. The Mensheviks: From the Revolution of 1917 to the Second World War. Chicago: University of Chicago Press, 1975.
- Haimson, L., The Russian Marxists and the Origins of Bolshevism. Cambridge: Harvard University Press, 1957.
- Alexander Potresov at The Great Soviet Encyclopedia. Moscow, 1979.
- Archive of Aleksandr Nikolaevič Potresov Papers at the International Institute of Social History
