= Emancipation of Labour =

Emancipation of Labour Освобождение труда
- Members of the Emancipation of Labour (1883-1903)
- Leader: Georgi Plekhanov
- Founders: Georgi Plekhanov; Vasily Ignatov; Vera Zasulich; Leo Deutsch; Pavel Axelrod
- Founded: 1883; 143 years ago
- Dissolved: August 23, 1903; 122 years ago
- Split from: Black Repartition
- Merged into: Russian Social Democratic Labour Party
- Ideology: Marxism; Democratic socialism
- Political position: Left-wing
- International affiliation: Second International

Emancipation of Labour (Russian: Освобождение труда) was the first Russian Marxist group. It was founded in exile by Georgi Plekhanov, Vasily Ignatov, Vera Zasulich, Leo Deutsch, and Pavel Axelrod, at Geneva (Switzerland) in 1883. Deutsch left the group in 1884 when he was arrested and sent to Siberia and Sergei Ingerman joined in 1888. The group published the first Russian language translations of many works by Karl Marx and distributed them. It became the major adversary to the Narodniks on the left wing of politics in the Russian Empire.

Two drafts (1883 and 1885) of a program for the Russian democratic socialists, written by Plekhanov, were also published by the group, marking an important step to what would become the building of the Russian Social Democratic Labour Party (RSDLP). At the first congress of the Second International in Paris (1889) onwards, the group represented the RSDLP.

Within Russia itself, Emancipation of Labour influenced a separate group, the League of Struggle for the Emancipation of the Working Class (Союз борьбы за освобождение рабочего класса), formed by Vladimir Lenin and others at Saint Petersburg in 1895. Lenin later wrote that Emancipation of Labour "laid the theoretical foundations for the Social-Democratic movement and took the first step towards the working-class movement in Russia."

Emancipation of Labour announced its dissolution during the Second Congress of the RSDLP, in August 1903.
