= Chigirin affair =

Ukrainian peasant struggle (1860s-1877)

The Chigirin affair or Chyhyryn affair was a two-phased peasant struggle over land; the struggle lasted from the 1860s through to 1877 in Chigirin district, Kyiv Province in the Russian Empire. The struggle was undertaken by the dusheviki, a group of local peasants who wanted land to be allotted to individual men instead of to households. Members of the dusheviki ceased paying taxes and other dues to pressure local officials to implement their desired version of land allotment. Local officials took to decisive action to eradicate peasant resistance. The affair was reinvigorated in 1876 when a group of populist leaders decided to become involved in the resistance by organizing peasants into a secret society called the Secret Druzhina that rose to 1000 members. The society was found out and disbanded by local officials in the latter half of 1887. Many arrests were made and a few members were sentenced. The effort was seen as a failure.

== Background ==
Kyiv Province in 1914

Chigirin, or Chyhyryn, District, Kyiv Province, was located southeast of Kyiv, between the Dnepr and Tiasmin rivers in modern day Ukraine. In the 1860s, the population of the district was largely made up of former state peasants. In 1861 the Russian government had abolished serfdom throughout the empire. In 1866, the government extended the emancipation statutes to state peasants. The government in St. Petersburg ruled in 1867 that former state peasants were to purchase for the land they had been cultivating from the state. In this act, the government ordered the land of former state peasants to be surveyed and appraised in order to adjust the payments former state peasants were to make for the land.

In accordance with the rulings, the old household tenure system of land distribution was to remain. This system, separate from the commune systems used in Russian villages, was specific to most Ukrainian lands. In this system, the village did not own the land within it. Instead, tracks of land were held by individual families or households. The land was passed down from fathers to sons. Land was not distributed fairly in the tenure system; richer families had more tracks of land than did poorer households.

When the government ruled that former state peasants were to purchase the land they worked on, many peasants in Chigirin district demanded the dismantling of the household tenure system. Many were in favor of a reallocation of land based on souls, that is, adult males. In this system land would be distributed to each adult male instead of to each household.

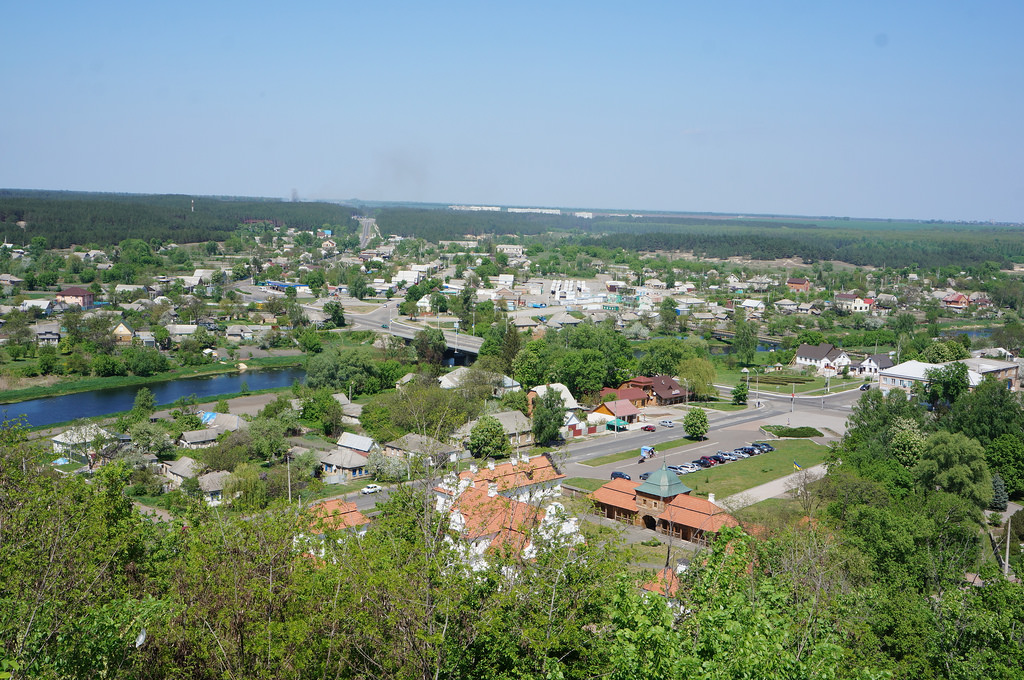
A modern view of Chigirin

The peasants in Chigirin were divided over the issue. The aktoviki were those who were in favor of the household tenure system. They accepted the government’s new acts relating to the payment of former state peasants for land. The dusheviki were those who desired the reallocation of land based on adult males rather than households. They desired that all adult males be given an equal amount of land. They did not comply with the new acts.

== Phase One ==
Various dusheviki groups from several villages in Kyiv district rallied together and issued statements declaring their refusal to submit to the government acts favoring the tenure system based on households. They also refused to pay taxes and the money they owed the government in order to redeem the lands they hard farmed. The dusheviki stated that by a recent ukaz, Alexander II had redistributed the land by souls rather than tenure. This ukaz was not real and was the result of a rumor that the tsar had redistributed the land by granting the peasants land that was owned by the state and nobility. The rumor held that the local officials had corrupted the tsar’s ruling.

The government took to decisive action to break the resistance of the dusheviki. In order to make up for the lost taxes and payments, the Russian government forcibly sold moveable property owned by the peasants. This method proved effective as many of the dusheviki returned to paying taxes and other dues to the government. This return to the payment of taxes was the norm throughout the district by January 1876.

The refractory village of Shabel'niki was the last holdout to tax payment. In order to gain compliance, the government began to quarter troops in the village. Soldiers were housed and fed by peasants, mainly of the dusheviki group. When the peasants could no longer house the soldiers the sheriff would house them at the expense of the government. After nine months the soldiers were removed from the village.

The government also attempted to dismantle the dusheviki. In 1875, the government imprisoned many of those they considered to be the ring leaders in various prisons in the province.

=== Foma Priadko ===
Foma Priadko was the most influential leader in the early phase of the Chigirin affair. Priadko, a retired soldier from the district, was one of the men that the peasants had sent to St. Petersburg to petition the tsar in 1872. Priadko was the only one who reached the capital; the others were sent home by the police. When Priadko returned from the capital, he traveled to the various villages in Chigirin affirming the dusheviki in their insistence of reallocation of land by souls. In November 1875, Priadko was arrested by the police. He was imprisoned and tried by court in Kyiv in 1876. He was eventually exiled to Siberia.

The affair would then move into the second phase.

== Phase Two ==
=== Iakov Stefanovich and Accomplices ===
Kherson Province in the Russian Empire

The dusheviki gained new momentum under the leadership of Iakov Stefanovich, an educated revolutionary who was the son of a Ukrainian priest. Stefanovich was a populist who had previously attempted to provoke peasants to rebel against the government. He escaped arrest by escaping to Switzerland in 1874. While in Switzerland, Stefanovich read about the grievances of the peasants in Chigirin and returned to Russia to help their cause. Stefanovich arrived at the village of Shabel’niki in the winter of 1875. His intent was to create a revolutionary movement in the province through which he would incite the peasants to rebel. In the village, Stefanovich assumed the identity of a peasant from Kherson province. He met with Lazar Tenenik, an influential peasant from the region, who Stefanovich told he would represent the village and wishes of the dusheviki to the tsar. Stefanovich gained the support of many local peasants and in February 1876 he set out for the capital.

Stefanovich's journey took months. In the summer of 1876, Stefanovich was in Elizavetgrad. Stefanovich was joined by other revolutionaries, notably Lev Deich and Vladimir Debogory-Mokrievich. Stefanovich and Debogory-Mokrievich wrote to Mikhail Bakunin of their intent, but Bakunin did not agree with the fraudulent tactics that the plot would be based on. In that case, Stefanovich only brought a few close associates into the planning for phase two of the affair.

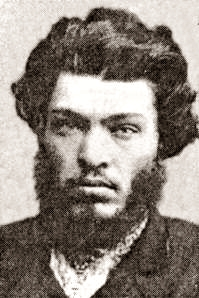
An Image of Iakov Stefanovich

Upon returning to Chigirin in November 1876, Stefanovich presented the peasants with documents supposedly from Alexander II. In reality, the documents had been crafted by Stefanovich. He first presented the dusheviki with The Secret Imperial Charter and then The Code of the Secret Druzhina. The documents, created by Stefanovich, alleged that the tsar had ordered the peasants to organize into a secret society to fight for their desires for land.

=== The Imperial Secret Charter ===
The Secret Imperial Charter said that when Alexander II had abolished serfdom in 1861, he had made all the estates of the realm equal by dividing land between the peasants and nobles equally. The charter ordered the peasants to associate in a secret society called the Secret Druzhina. The society was to be made up of peasants to fight for their freedom as the tsar was surrounded by people who blocked his will. "Even if the tsar himself was to die, the peasants were to continue to fight, until all the Russian land was equally divided." The charter had a gold seal inscribed with the words “Emperor Alexander II.”

=== The Code of the Secret Druzhina ===
The Code, also drafted by Stefanovich and falsely in the name of the tsar, held that the peasants were to take the land by force and end the taxes that were forced to pay. The Code specified the organizational structure of the secret society.

At the head of the society was the Council of Commissars. Under the Commissars was the Council of Elders, who were voted for by each eldership, ie, a group of twenty-five members. From its reansk, the elders selected a treasurer and an ataman. Stefanovich purposely framed his society in cossack language, as the cossacks were then thought of as historical heroes in Ukraine.

=== The Ceremony of the Holy Oath ===
The oath was required for a peasant to become a member of the secret society. An initiate needed two members to vouch for them. The oath was performed before an icon and a cross. In religious language, the initiate swore to secrecy and to recruit other peasants to the society. Only males could officially join the society.

=== Secret Druzhina ===
Shortly after returning to Chigirin in November, Stefanovich persuaded a few peasants to join his secret society. Some peasants were but Stefanovich managed to persuade 8 peasants to join his society. Through these initiates, knowledge about the secret society spread through the peasantry of the district. The society grew rapidly, reaching to about 500 members after a few months. The rapid growth of the society soon meant that Stefanovich and Diech had limited control over the large group. Some peasants were joining the society simply hoping to receive land without understanding the group's purpose and structure.

By May 1877, a rumor was spreading in the district that those who desired land and freedom should enlist in a society based in the village of Shabel’niki. The officials in the district began to investigate the rumor. Delegates to Shabel’niki to assess the matter. A list of members from the village of Adamkova was found. Surveillance was increased in the district.

The leader of the canton of Shabel’niki got a member of the secret society drunk and was informed by that person that peasants were joining a secret society by taking an oath. Knowledge of the society reached the governor of the province then the gendarmerie. In July 1877, a team of investigators was sent to Chigirin. An investigation was carried out for two weeks but without success.

== Outcome ==
In 1877, Erofei Prukii, a member of the society, was arrested. After this arrest one member of the society gave the police the Code. Another member produced a copy of the Charter that Stefanovich had given him. The authorities, with the aid of soldiers, raided local villages and arrested many members of the society. When the society was destroyed more than 1,000 people were implicated.

"Stefanovich, Bokhanovskii, Deich and more than thousand peasants from 20 villages of Chigirin district were arrested by December of 1877." The three revolutionary leaders were imprisoned in the Lukianvoskii Holding Facility. Only 22 members of the society were put on trial and only 6 were sentenced. The rest were acquitted.

Stefanovich was arrested on September 4, 1877. He escaped from prison in May 1878. He was involved in further revolutionary movements until 1882. He was recaptured and sent to Siberian exile in 1883.

== Legacy ==
The Chigirin affair is considered to have sealed the fate of the Narodnik movement and closed a period of peasant upheaval in Russia. The episode is cited as an embarrassment to Russia's revolutionary movement. Additionally, revolutionaries of the day debated about the ethics of using deception in their undertakings.

While the secret society had been stamped out my the local government, the Secret Druzhina nonetheless continued to figure into life in Chigirin district. Some former members of the society joined Stundist groups in Kyiv province. Two of the peasants who had been sentenced converted to the religious persuasion. When these individuals were released from prison they "disseminated rumours that “in the future all the land would be distributed equally among all peasants, and that the government and clergy would cease to exist.”" One of these peasants noted that the populists who were imprisoned because of their involvement in the Chigirin affair told him stories of a "country where all the land was distributed equally among all people." Both peasants believed that the people who had assassinated Alexander II intended to create this economic equality in Russia. Both peasants were tried in court for "high treason" in light of this teaching. However, they were acquitted on August 17.1881. Local officials urged the case to be reconsidered in light of the significant involvement of both peasants in the Secret Druzhina.
