= 2nd Congress of the Russian Social Democratic Labour Party =

1903 party congress

- Host country: Belgium, United Kingdom
- Date: July 30, 1903-August 23, 1903
- Cities: Brussels, London
- Participants: Julius Martov, Vladimir Lenin
- Follows: 1st Congress (1898)
- Precedes: 3rd Congress (1905)

Bolshevik delegates at the 2nd Congress of the RSDLP (4 photos are missing)

Menshevik (top row), anti-Iskrist (middle row) and Neutral (centre) delegates at the 2nd Congress (6 photos missing: 2 Mensheviks, 1 anti-Iskrist and 3 Centre)

The Second Congress of the Russian Social Democratic Labour Party was held from July 30 to August 23 (July 17 – August 10, O.S.) 1903, starting in Brussels, Belgium (until August 6) and ending in London, United Kingdom. Probably as a result of diplomatic pressure from the Russian Embassy, Belgian police had forced the delegates to leave the country on August 6. The congress finalized the creation of the Marxist party in Russia proclaimed at the 1st Congress of the RSDLP. This congress brought the first split within the party, between the Bolshevik faction led by Lenin, and the Menshevik faction led by Martov.

== Preparation ==
The Organising Committee for convening the Second Congress of the RSDLP was originally elected at the Białystok Conference held in March (April) 1902, but soon after the conference all the committee members but one were arrested. At Lenin's suggestion, a new Organising Committee was set up at a conference of Social-Democratic committees held in November 1902 in Pskov. On this committee the Iskra-ists had an overwhelming majority. Under Lenin's guidance, the Organising Committee carried out extensive preparatory work for the Second Congress. Draft Regulations for the convening of the Congress were adopted at a plenary session held in Orel in February 1903. Following this plenary session, members of the Organising Committee twice visited the local Party organisations with a view to assisting them in their work. With their participation, the local committees discussed the draft Regulations, after which the Organising Committee finally endorsed the Regulations and approved a list of the local organisations entitled under them to representation at the Congress. The Organising Committee prepared for the Congress a detailed written report on its activities.

== Congress ==
There were 37 sessions and 51 delegates. Of these, 33 supported Iskra, the party newspaper (controlled by Lenin and his close allies), 5 backed the Bund and there were 2 "economists" (Marxists who believed workers should concentrate on economic demands rather than political ones). 6 delegates were neutral.

According to historian Richard Cavendish, the delegates originally "assembled in a flea-ridden flour warehouse in Brussels", where they elected Georgi Plekhanov as chair.

During the fifteenth session the delegates voted in favor of supporting a dictatorship of the proletariat as it approved into the party programme the paragraph "A necessary condition for this social revolution is the dictatorship of the proletariat, that is, conquest by the proletariat of such political power as will enable it to suppress any resistance by the exploiters.".

The Congress saw the RSDLP split into Bolsheviks and Mensheviks as a result of a dispute between Lenin and Julius Martov over the major points of the Party Programme. At the 22nd session, Lenin and Martov disagreed on the wording of the first party rule defining membership. Lenin proposed a party member should be someone "Who recognizes the party's program and supports it by material means and by personal participation in one of the party organisations". Martov's wording was slightly different: "regular personal association under the direction of one of the party organisations". The dispute was about whether the party should have a loose membership or whether it should be a party of professional revolutionaries. Plekhanov, founder of Russian Marxism, supported Lenin. Leon Trotsky, future leader of the Petrograd Soviet, backed Martov. The congress voted 28–23 in Martov's favour but his support included the 7 Bundists and Economists who would later walk out from the congress. This left Lenin's faction in the majority, so Lenin called his faction the Bolsheviks or majoritarians. Martov accepted this, calling his faction the Mensheviks or minoritarians.

At the 27th session, one of the constituent groups of the party, the General Jewish Labour Bund, asked that the Bund would be recognized as the sole representative of the Jewish working class in Russia. A Bundist delegate tabled a motion that all Russian citizens should have the right to use their own language. Lenin and the Iskra group opposed the motion. It was defeated in a tie, 23 votes against 23 votes. However, a similar motion proposed by Noe Zhordania (leader of the Transcaucasian Social Democrats) was passed. Moreover, the Bund proposed that the RSDLP should have a federal structure, with the Bund as a constituent party. This was defeated 41–5 (5 abstentions). Bolsheviks and Mensheviks were united in their opposition to the Bundist proposal, calling it separatist, nationalist and opportunist. After their proposal was rejected, the Bund withdrew from the RSDLP. The two economists also walked out when the congress decided that the Iskraists should represent the party abroad.

The 2nd Central Committee was elected at the congress. Iskra's editorial board became the party's Central Organ and was cut from six to three members (Lenin, Plekhanov and Martov).

According to Cavendish, the day after the congress ended, Lenin, who knew London well, took some of the delegates to the Natural History Museum and London Zoo, "followed by a respectful visit to Karl Marx’s grave in Highgate Cemetery.
