= Yuliy =

Yuliy is a given name. Notable people with the name include:

- Yuliy Aykhenval'd or Yuly Aykhenvald (1872–1928), Russian Jewish literary critic who developed a native brand of Aestheticism
- Yuliy Daniel or Yuli Daniel (1925–1988), Soviet dissident writer, poet, translator, and political prisoner
- Yuliy Dmitrievich Engel (1868–1927), music critic, composer and one of the leading figures in the Jewish art music movement
- Yuliy Ganf (1898–1973), Soviet Russian graphic artist, People's Artist of the USSR
- Yuliy Kim (born 1936), one of Russia's foremost bards and playwrights
- Yuliy Mamchur (born 1971), Ukrainian colonel and politician
- Yuliy Meitus (1903–1997), distinguished Ukrainian composer, famous for his operas
- Yuliy Sannikov (born 1978), Ukrainian economist
- Yuliy Osipovich Tsederbaum (1873–1923), leader of the Mensheviks in early twentieth century Russia
- Yuliy Mikhailovich Vorontsov (1929–2007), Russian diplomat, President of International Centre of the Roerichs (Moscow)

== See also ==
- You Lie (disambiguation)
- Yue Li
