= Vladimir Shtranikh =

Soviet painter, graphic artist, stage designer, and educator (1888–1981)

Vladimir Fedorovich Shtranikh (Russian: Штраних Владимир Фёдорович). Born: October 1 [O.S. 19 September], 1888 inTsaritsyno, Moscow Governorate. Died: February 28, 1981 (aged 92) in Moscow USSR. was a Soviet painter, poster artist, graphic designer, stage designer, and educator. Genre: Landscape, Social realism. Education: Moscow School of Painting, Sculpture and Architecture. He was named People's Artist of the RSFSR in 1975 and People's Artist of the USSR in 1978, and elected a corresponding member of the Academy of Arts of the USSR in 1959.

== Early life and education ==
Born into a Smolensk family tracing its lineage to Livonian knights, Shtranikh was introduced to art by his amateur-painter grandfather. He spent his childhood in Smolensk and in 1900 enrolled at the Imperial Stroganov Central Higher Industrial and Applied Arts College (now Stroganov Moscow State Academy of Arts and Industry), studying under Sergei Vinogradov, Konstantin Pervukhin, and Dmitry Shcherbinovsky. After graduating in 1907, he joined the Bolshoi Theatre as a decorator's assistant, where he met Konstantin Korovin—his principal mentor. In 1909, while working at the Bolshoi, he entered the Moscow School of Painting, Sculpture and Architecture, studying with Apollinary Vasnetsov, Konstantin Korovin, Abram Arkhipov, Sergey Malyutin, and Leonid Pasternak, and was influenced by Vladimir Mayakovsky.

== Military service and early career ==
Upon completing his studies in 1916, Shtranikh was drafted into the Imperial Russian Army as an artilleryman, served at the front, and was awarded the Cross of St. George for bravery, being promoted to junior artillery officer in March 1917. Embracing the October Revolution, he remained in Smolensk in 1918, and assumed leadership roles—chairman of the Art Council of the Smolensk provincial art workers' union, stage designer for the Smolensk Theatre, and artistic director of the Proletkult art studio—where he taught future artists such as Konstantin Dorokhov, Michael Khazanovsky, and Nikolay Padalitsyn.

== Return to Moscow and mature work ==
Shtranikh returned to Moscow in 1922 and became a leading painter of the era, gaining renown for industrial landscapes and naval themes—depicting ship hulls, floating docks, and maritime life—and for his poster work, with distinctive hand-drawn fonts published in the Soviet press. An active exhibitor from 1912, he participated in the 3rd Ryazan Painting Exhibition (1919), the 2nd State Exhibition in Smolensk (1921), the Exhibition of 22 Artists (1927), "Poster in the Service of the Five-Year Plan" (Moscow, 1932), and "Public Education of the USSR" in London (1932); his first major solo show was held in Smolensk in 1959. He was a member of the Artists' Union of the USSR 1937 and was a corresponding member of the Academy of Arts of the USSR from 1959. Among his later students in Moscow was the painter Vera Gutkina.

== Graphic design and typography ==
Shtranikh's very first graphic commission was designing the trademark for the Arena artists' collective in Smolensk (1923). From 1924 to 1937 he served as staff artist-designer for the newspaper Rabochaya Gazeta, creating its illustrated supplements and industrial advertising campaigns. In 1928 he designed two original display typefaces—Prospekt, a geometric slab-serif (in rounded and extended styles with oblique serifs), and a narrow geometric grotesque—which appeared in mastheads, book covers, posters, and magazine titles. As chief artist of the photo magazine Stroim (1929–1935), he turned it into a standalone journal, pioneered dynamic diagonal photomontage layouts with decorative lettering (often in collaboration with Boris Ridiger), and by 1933 refined its style with wider margins and concise legends before Alexander Zhitomirsky succeeded him.

== Style and legacy ==
Shtranikh's work is characterized by rhythmic, energetic brushwork and vibrant color planes; for example, his painting "Autumn in the South Borders of the Country" (1963–1967) conveys industrial dynamism through tight, elastic strokes and rhythmic color harmonies. He also painted lyrical scenes of Russian nature and embodied socialist-realist principles in depictions of labor and national achievements.

== Collections ==
Works by Shtranikh are held in the permanent collections of the State Tretyakov Gallery (Moscow), the State Russian Museum (in St. Petersburg), and the Smolensk State Historical and Architectural Art Museum-Reserve, as well as in other Russian museums and in private collections worldwide.

== Honors and awards ==
- Honored Artist of the RSFSR (13 September 1968)
- People's Artist of the RSFSR (1 July 1975)
- People's Artist of the USSR (18 October 1978)
- Corresponding Member of the Academy of Arts of the USSR (1959)

== Death ==
Shtranikh died on 28 February 1981 in Moscow and was buried at Vostryakovskoye Cemetery.
