= Sverdlov Communist University =

Soviet university (1918–1938)

- Коммунистический университет имени Я. М. Свердлова
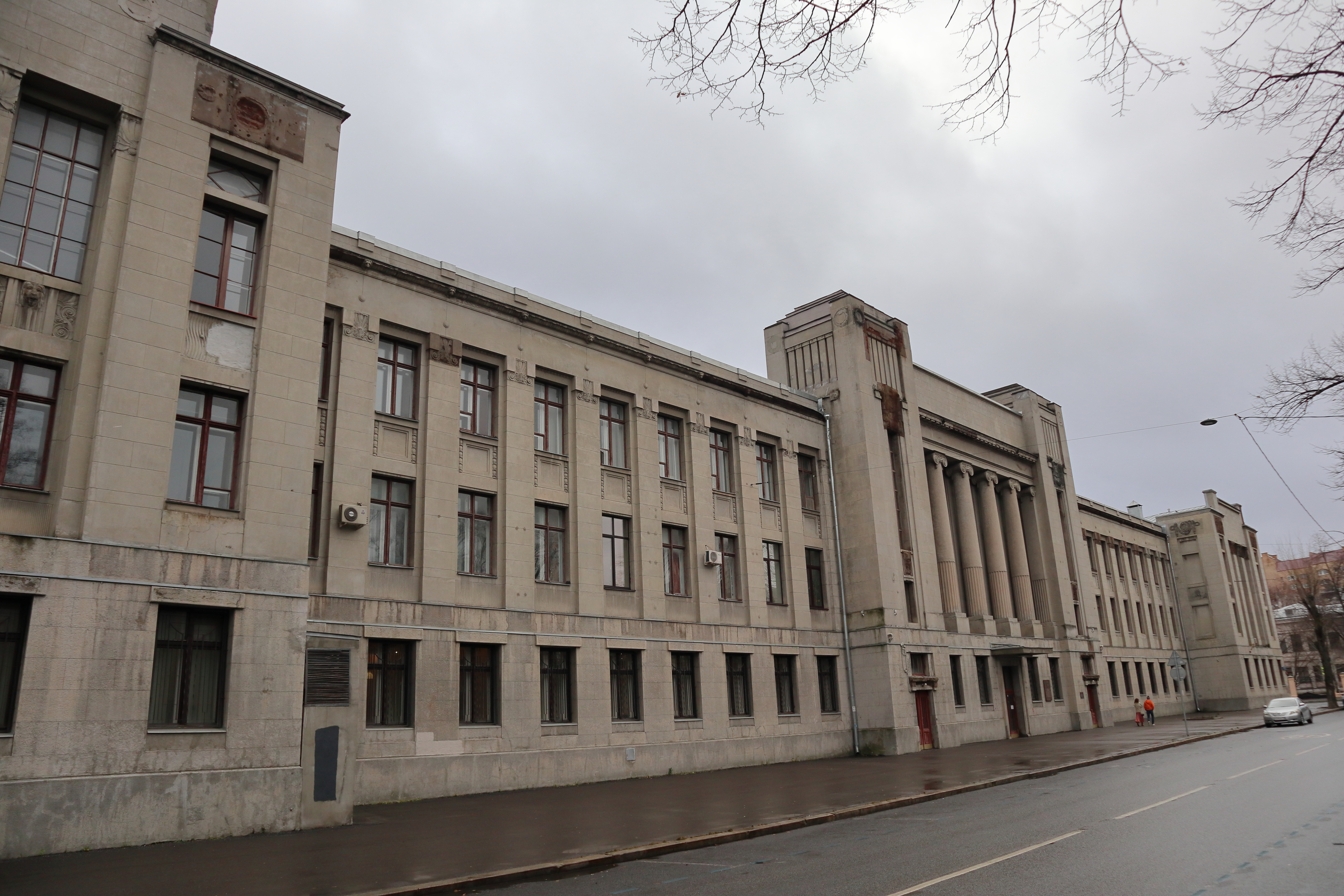
- The former University's building at RSUH in Tverskoy, Moscow
- Former names: Central School for Soviet and Party Work
- Active: 1918–6 January 1938
- Parent institution: VTsIK
- Founding rector: Vladimir Nevsky
- Location: Moscow, Russian SFSR
- Language: Russian

The Sverdlov Communist University (Russian: Коммунистический университет имени Я. М. Свердлова) was a school for Soviet activists in Moscow, founded in 1918 as the Central School for Soviet and Party Work. After the death of the Bolshevik leader Yakov Sverdlov, the institution was named after him. Its founding rector was Vladimir Nevsky.

== History ==
In July 1918, courses for agitators and instructors were established in Moscow under the All-Russian Central Executive Committee. In January 1919, the courses were transformed into the School of Soviet Work. On its basis, by order of the 8th Congress of the Russian Communist Party (b), the Central School of Soviet and Party Work was established, renamed in July 1919 into the Communist University named after Y. M. Sverdlov.

The curriculum was more concerned with the speedy training of party militants rather than in developing any depth of knowledge. Many of the intakes had had little formal education however literacy was an entry requirement. However there was a Rabfak attached where prospective entrants could receive some preparatory education. Sverdlov was working on developing these courses at the time of his death. When it opened several weeks later on 1 June 1919, it was named in his honour.

The main reason for the creation of the institution was the delivery of the "Short Courses" which could be completed in 10–14 days. These were concerned with basic training in propaganda work.

The course of study at the university at first was 6–8 months, then it was increased to 2, 3, 4 years. Institutions at the university were:

- Evening Communist University
- Evening Soviet party school
- Sunday Communist University
- Correspondence Communist University
- Lecturer courses, in the future - the institute of graduate students.

The departments of philosophy, history, political economy, law, natural science, linguistics also existed at the Communist University at various times.

Over the first 10 years, more than 10 thousand people graduated from the university, 19 thousand people studied at it.

By the Decree of the Central Committee of the Communist Party of the Soviet Union (CPSU), the Communist University was reorganized into the Higher Communist Agricultural University named after Ya. M. Sverdlov. Its main task was the training of leading personnel for collective farms, state farms, MTS and district committees.

By a decree of the CPSU on 6 January 1938, the All-Union Communist Agricultural University named after Ya. M. Sverdlov was closed.

== Staff ==
The prominent political activists who lectured at the university included: Vladimir Lenin, Joseph Stalin, Yakov Sverdlov, Maxim Gorky, Mikhail Kalinin, Valerian Kuybyshev, Anatoly Lunacharsky, Nikolai Bukharin.

Notable teachers at Sverdlov Communist University included:

- Vladimir Adoratsky
- N. N. Baturin
- Andrei Bubnov
- Mikhail Vladimirsky
- Viacheslav Petrovich Volgin
- Sergey Ivanovich Gusev
- F. Ia. Kon
- N. M. Lukin
- S. I. Mitskevich
- S. A. Piontkovskii
- Mikhail Pokrovsky
- Ivan Skvortsov-Stepanov
- A. M. Stopani
- Yemelyan Yaroslavsky

Rectors:

- Vladimir Nevsky (1919–1921)
- V. P. Antonov-Saratovsky (1921–1923)
- Martyn Liadov (1923–1928)
- Konstantin Maltsev (1928–1931)
- N. Lvov (1932–1934)
- V. Uvarov (1934–1935)
- Gindin (1936–1937)
