= Kosovorotka =

Traditional Russian shirt

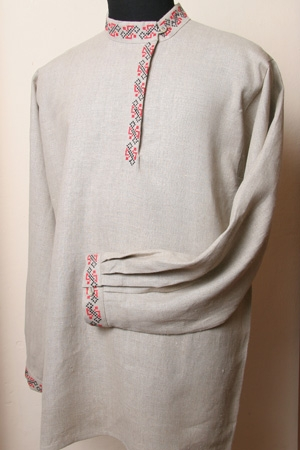
Men's kosovorotka.

A kosovorotka (Russian: косоворо́тка, IPA: [kəsəvɐˈrotkə]), also known in the West as a Russian peasant shirt. The name comes from the Russian phrase kosoy vorot (косой ворот), meaning a “skewed collar”. It was worn by all peasants in Russia — men, women, and babies — in different styles for every-day and festive occasions.

Easy to make from one sheet of fabric, this garment is traditional for Russians, Mordovins, Setos, Komi-Permyaks and other ethnic groups in Russia, as well as in some regions of Moldova.

== Description ==
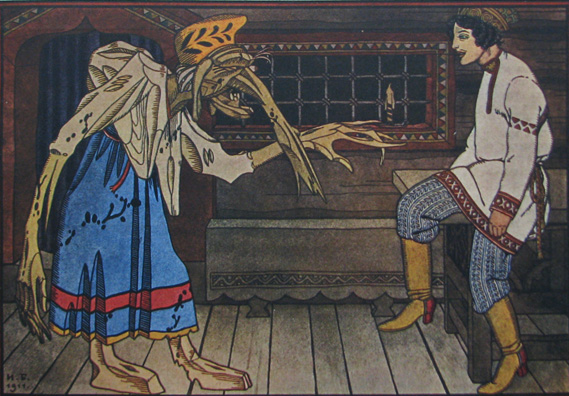
Ivashka in a Kosovorotka and Baba Yaga from the fairy tale about three Tsar vonders and about Ivaschka, the priest's son. Ivan Bilibin, 1911

A kosovorotka is a traditional Russian shirt, long sleeved and reaching down to the mid-thigh. The shirt is not buttoned all the way down to the hem, but has several buttons at the collar (unfastened when the garment is pulled over the wearer's head), though these are positioned off to one side (regional styles vary between left and right), instead of centrally, as is customary with a typical Western 20th and 21st century man's shirt. The side slit was to prevent cross pendants that peasants wore under their shirts from falling out when they bent down during active physical labor. If left unbuttoned the collar appears skewed, which accounts for the garment's name. The collar and sleeves of kosovorotka were often decorated with a traditional embroidered ornament.

Russian medievalist Dmitry Likhachev suggested that kosovorotka was worn by peasants because the skewed collar of the shirt prevented the pendant cross from falling out from under the shirt.

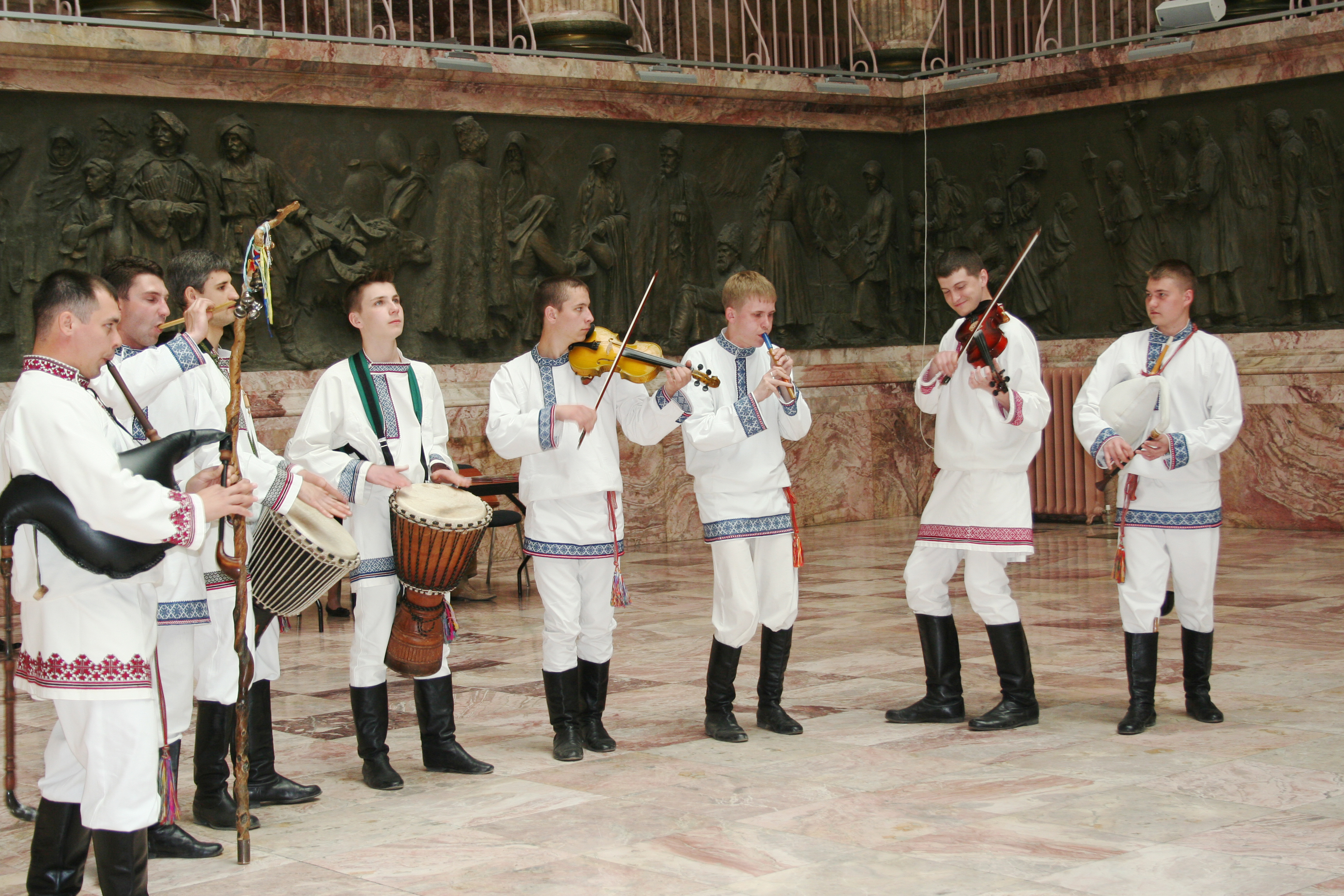
Members of the Mordvin folk ensemble "Torama" in the Russian Museum of Ethnography in St. Petersburg wearing Kosovorotkas

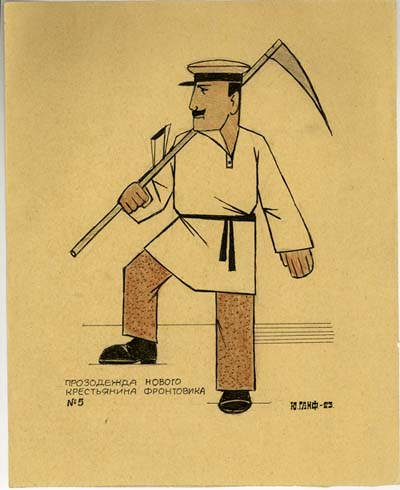
A drawing by Yuliy Ganf, 1923.

Generally associated with Russian peasants, the kosovorotka was worn by peasants and townsmen of various social categories into the early 20th century, when it was rapidly displaced as an everyday garment by more efficient and less elaborate clothing after the Bolshevik Revolution of 1917. Some assert that the writer Leo Tolstoy was wearing kosovorotka. In fact, he was wearing a blouse that has later become known as tolstovka ("blouse à la Tolstoï").

Since the late 20th century kosovorotkas appear mostly as souvenirs and as scenic garments of Russian folk music, song and dance ensembles.

== In popular culture ==
The kosovorotka is worn by Omar Sharif as Yuri Zhivago in David Lean's 1965 film Doctor Zhivago.

== See also ==
- Vyshyvanka, equivalent shirt in Ukraine and Belarus
