= Krokodil =

Soviet and Russian satirical magazine (1922–2008)

Крокодил
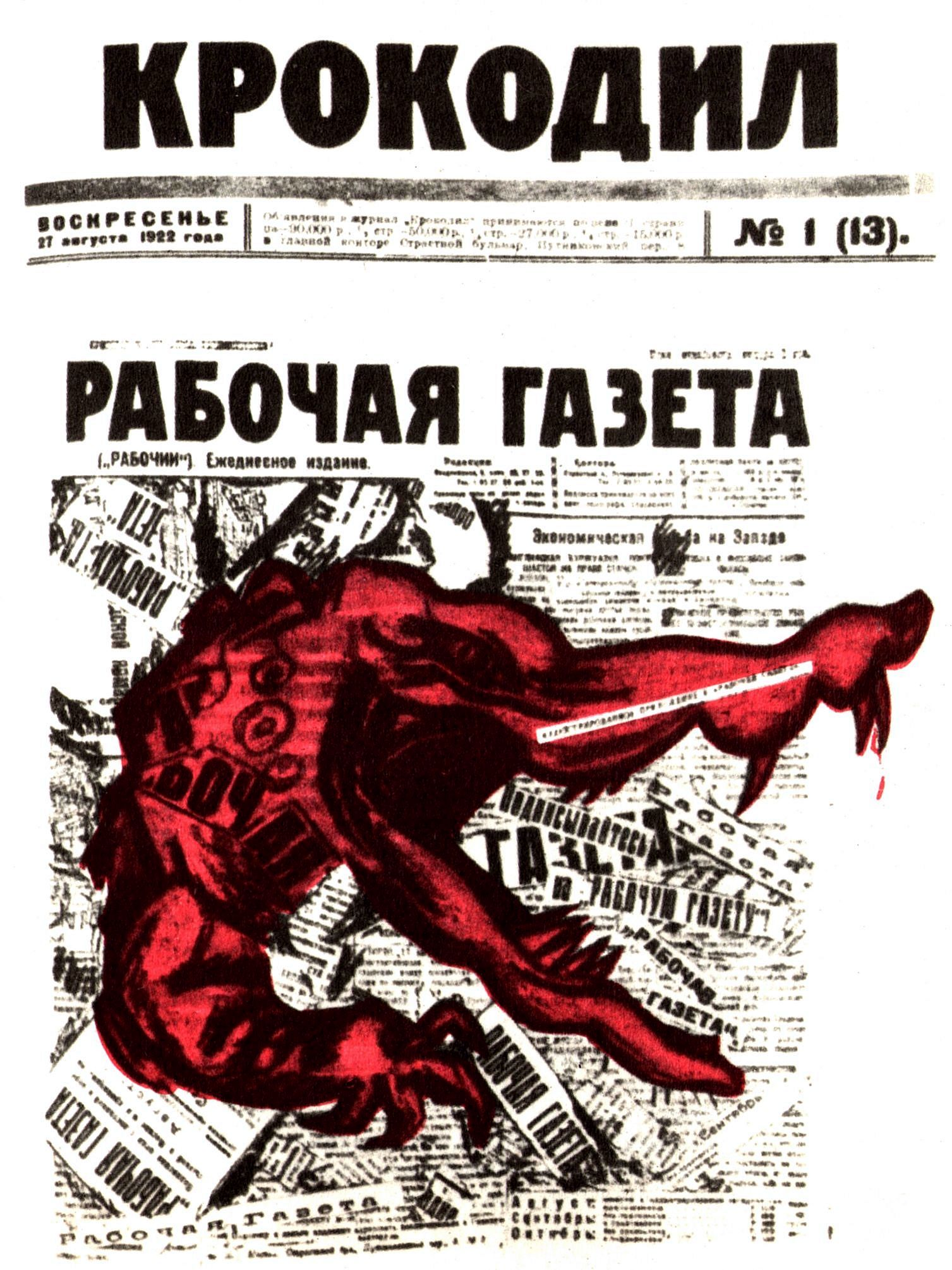
- The Unexpected Appendix. The cover of the first issue of Krokodil by Ivan Malyutin.
- Categories: Satire and humour
- Frequency: 3 issues per month
- Publisher: Rabochaya Gazeta, Pravda
- Founded: 1922
- First issue: 27 August 1922
- Final issue: 2008
- Country: Soviet Union; Russia
- Based in: Moscow
- Language: Russian
- ISSN: 0130-2671

Krokodil (Russian: Крокодил, IPA: [krəkɐˈdʲil], lit. 'crocodile') was a satirical magazine published in the Soviet Union and later Russia. The first issue was published on 27 August 1922 as the satirical supplement to the Workers' Gazette (called simply «Приложения» [Supplement]). When it became a separate publication, the name Crocodile was chosen at an editorial meeting from among a list of suggested animal names. At that time, many satirical magazines existed, such as Zanoza and Prozhektor. Nearly all of them eventually disappeared.

== History ==
Krokodil was founded in 1922, first as a supplement to Rabochaya Gazeta ('Workers' Newspaper'), and was published once a week. Although political satire was dangerous during much of the Soviet period, Krokodil was given considerable license to lampoon political figures and events. Typical and safe topics for lampooning in the Soviet era were the lack of initiative and imagination promoted by the style of an average Soviet middle-bureaucrat and the problems produced by drinking on the job by Soviet workers. Krokodil also ridiculed capitalist countries and attacked various political, ethnic and religious groups that allegedly opposed the Soviet system.

Many notable persons contributed to the magazine, including Vladimir Mayakovsky, Mikhail Zoshchenko, Kukriniksy, and Yuliy Ganf.

Similar magazines existed in all the Union republics, and in several ASSRs and in other states of the Soviet bloc, e.g. Hosteni ("The Goad") in Albania, Starshel ("Wasp") in Bulgaria, Eulenspiegel in East Germany, Urzica ("The Nettle") in Romania, Dikobraz ("Porcupine") in Czechoslovakia, and Szpilki ("Pins") in Poland.

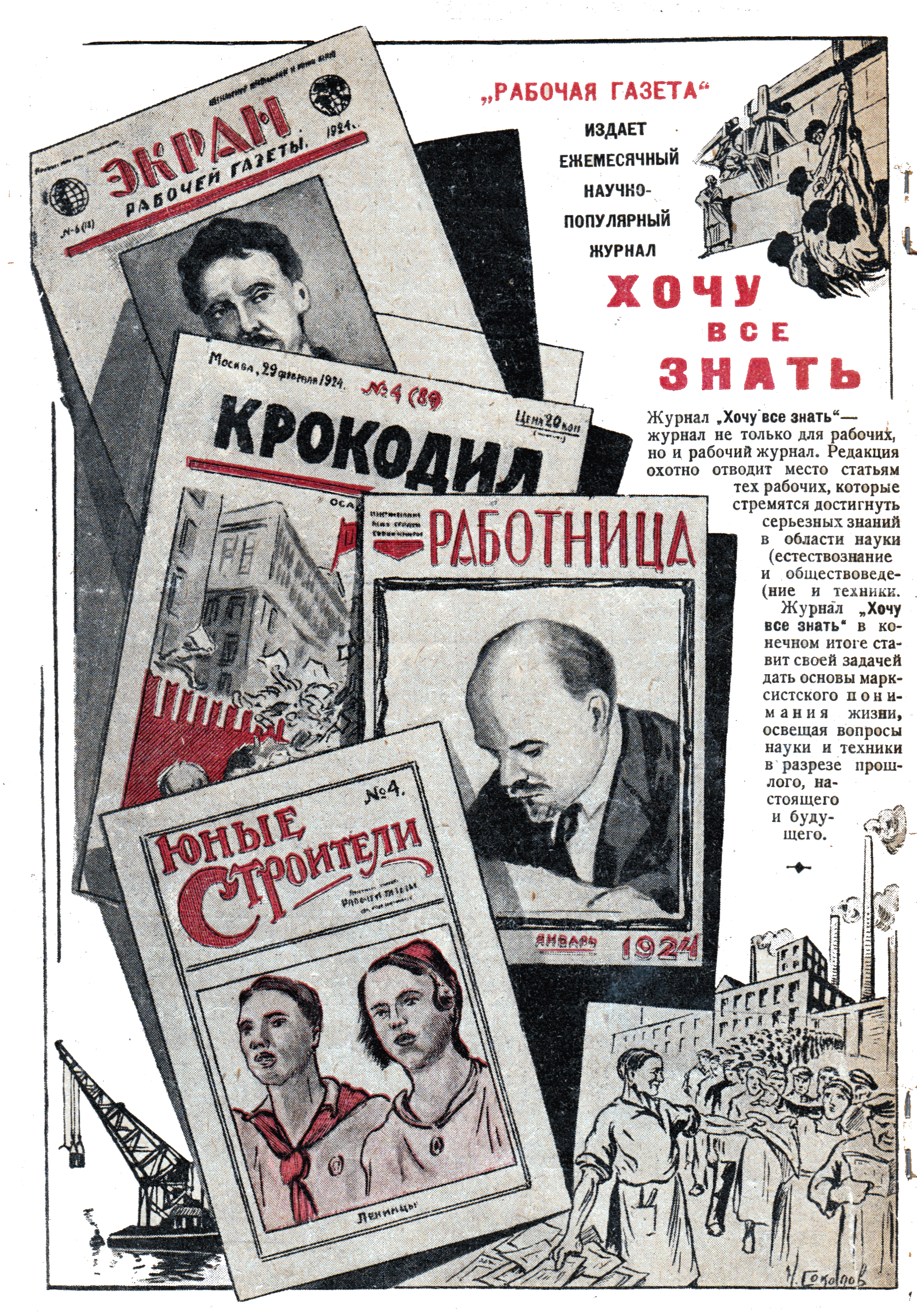
Supplements to the Workers' newspaper, 1924

Among the vocal compositions of Dmitri Shostakovich, who is known for his satirical character, there are 5 Romances on texts from Krokodil Magazine (1965), taken from the section of the magazine where were published real-life nonsense texts.

Republic	Title	Translation
Ukrainian SSR	Перець	Pepper
Belarusian SSR	Вожык	Hedgehog
Uzbek SSR	Муштум	Fist
Kazakh SSR	Ара	Bumblebee
Georgian SSR	ნიანგი	Crocodile
Azerbaijani SSR	Кирпи	Hedgehog
Lithuanian SSR	Šluota	Broom
Moldavian SSR	Кипэруш	Pepper
Latvian SSR	Dadzis	Bur
Kyrgyz SSR	Чалкан	Nettle
Tajik SSR	Хорпуштак	Hedgehog
Armenian SSR	Ոզնի	Hedgehog
Turkmen SSR	Токмак	Mallet
Estonian SSR	Pikker	Pikker
Bashkir ASSR	Хэнэк	Pitchfork
Chuvash ASSR	Капкан	Trap
Komi ASSR	Чушканзі	Wasp
Mari ASSR	Пачемыш	Wasp
Tatar ASSR	Чаян	Scorpion
Udmurt ASSR	Шӧкыч	Hornet

== Reinstatement ==
After the 1991 dissolution of the Soviet Union the magazine was discontinued (2000). It was reinstated in 2005 in Russia, issued monthly, headquartered in Moscow, and with editor-in-chief Sergei Mostovshchikov. The reinstated version, deliberately printed on old Soviet-style paper, ceased publication in 2008.

== Editors-in-chief ==
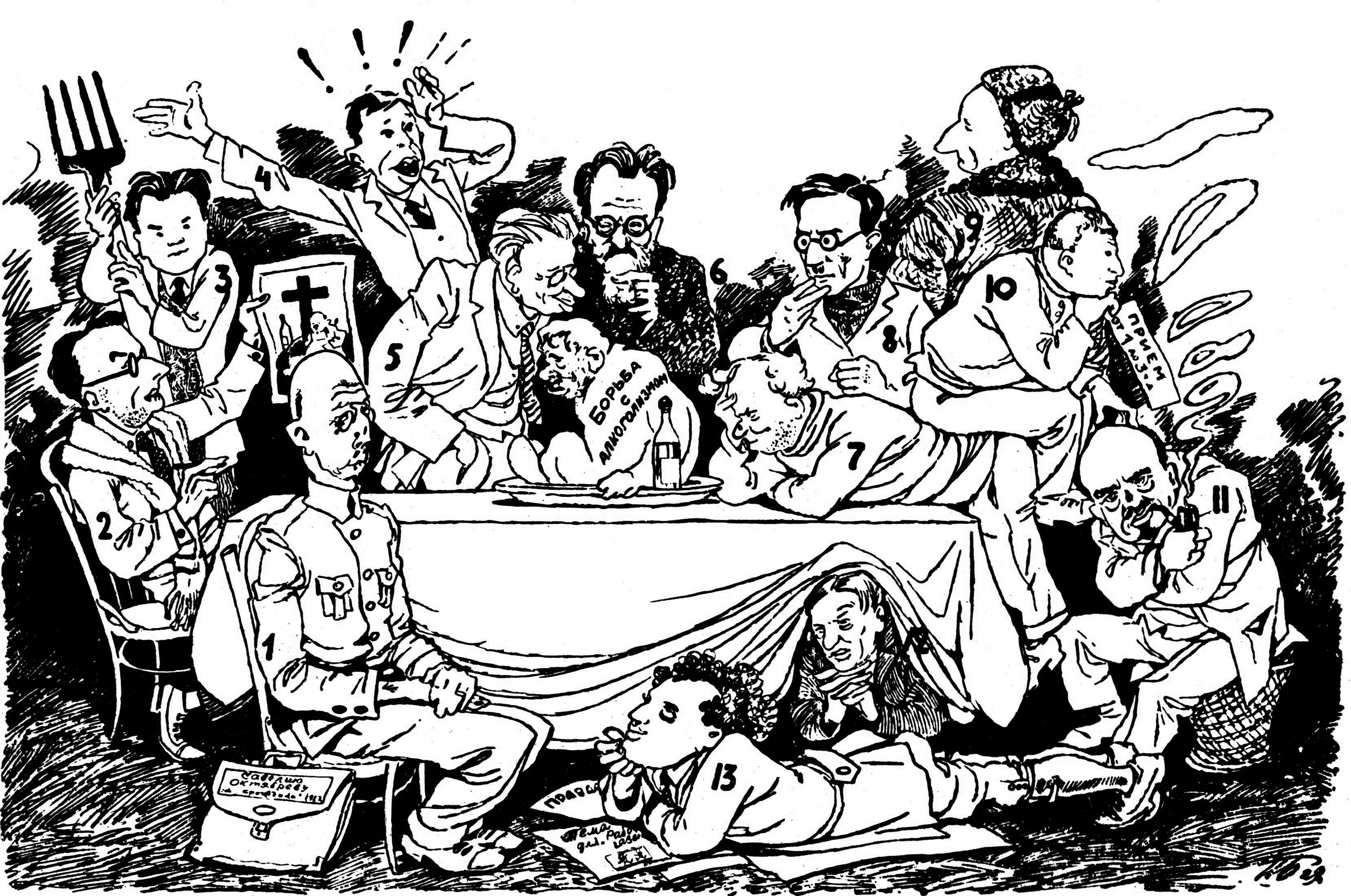
The Editorial Staff of Krokodil Discussing a Theme. A friendly jest by Pyotr Belyanin (1929).

- Konstantin Eremeev (1922–1923)
- Nikolay Smirnov (1924–1927)
- Konstantin Maltsev (1927–1928)
- Felix Kohn (1928–1930)
- Nikolay Ivanov-Gramen (1928–1930)
- Mikhail Manuilsky (1930–1934)
- Mikhail Koltsov (1934–1938)
- Yakov Rovinsky (1938–1941)
- Lazar Lagin (1938–1941)
- Grigory Ryklin (1941–1948)
- Dmitry Belyaev (1948–1953)
- Sergei Shvetsov (1953–1958)
- Manuil Semyonov (1958–1975)
- Evgeny Dubrovin (1975–1985)
- Alexey Pyanov (1986–2000)
- Emil Bondarenko (since 2017)

== See also ==
- Molla Nasraddin, an Azerbaijani satirical periodical published in the early 20th century.
