= Konstantin Maltsev =

Soviet politician

- Константин Мальцев

Chairman of the All-Union Committee for Radiofication and Radio Broadcasting
- In office October 1936 – January 1939
- Preceded by: Platon Kerzhentsev
- Succeeded by: G. Stukov

Personal details
- Born: Missing required parameter 1=month! , 1888 Usolye, Russian Empire
- Died: 28 July 1941 (aged 52–53) Kommunarka shooting ground, Soviet Union
- Citizenship: Soviet Union
- Party: CPSU

Konstantin Aleksandrovich Maltsev (Russian: Константин Александрович Мальцев) was a Soviet party and government figure, participant in the revolutionary movement, editor, rector of the Sverdlov Communist University, deputy People's Commissariat of Education of the RSFSR, chairman of the All-Union Committee for Radiofication and Broadcasting under the Council of People's Commissars of the USSR.

== Biography ==
Born in 1888 in Usolye, Perm Governorate. His father was a forest ranger. After the death of his parents, after finishing primary school, he moved to Kazan, then to his brother in Petrovsky Zavod in Transbaikal. He studied at the Troitskosavsky Real School.

In 1905, he joined the Russian Social Democratic Labour Party. He worked in an underground printing house in Verkhneudinsk, distributed leaflets, and transported weapons for workers from Chita to Verkhneudinsk. In 1907, he was arrested and spent a year and a half in prison in Verkhneudinsk Prison. In 1908, his prison sentence was replaced by exile to Yakutia. He escaped from exile to the Lena gold mines, was repeatedly arrested, and was returned to his place of exile. In 1912, he worked as an oiler on the railroad, and was a member of the railroad workers' strike committee. After the Lena strike in Bodaibo, he was again sent to Yakutsk to his place of registration.

In 1917-1918 he served as the chairman of the Bodaybo Committee of the RSDLP(b), Chairman of the Central Executive Committee of the Council of Workers' and Soldiers' Deputies of the Lena-Vitim Mining District. In 1918, after the capture of Irkutsk by the White Army, he was arrested and held in the Aleksandrovsky Central for 11 months. He was subject to exile to Ust-Uda, but escaped on the way. In 1919, he joined a partisan detachment, which was transformed into the 1st Communist Regiment. He became the regiment's commissar.

In 1920 he served as Secretary of the Usolsky District Committee of the Communist Party of the Soviet Union. In 1920-1921 he served as head of the village, then organizational department of the Irkutsk provincial committee of the Communist Party. In 1921 he was th executive secretary of the Cheremkhovsky District committee of the RCP(b).

In 1921-1922 - head of the agitation and propaganda department of the Vladimir provincial committee of the Communist Party. In 1922-1924 he was the head of the agitation and propaganda department of the Tula Governorate party committee of the Communist Party, from May to June 1924 executive secretary of the Tula Governorate committee of the Communis Party.

In 1924-1927 he served Deputy Head of the Agitation and Propaganda Department of the Central Committee of the Communist Party (since 1925 - VKP(b)). В ноябре 1924 года вошёл в состав Главреперткома. In November 1924 he joined the Main Repertoire Committee, and from December 1924 - member of the Presidium of the Artistic Council for Cinema Affairs under the Main Political Education Directorate. Member of the editorial board of the magazine "Soviet Cinema" (1925).

In 1927-1928 he was the editor-in-chief of Rabochaya Gazeta and its supplements: the magazines "Krokodil" and "Murzilka". Editor-in-chief of the newspaper "Kino" (1927–1930). Chairman of the board of the Society of Friends of Soviet Cinema (1926–1928).

In 1928-1931 he served as the rector of the Sverdlov Communist University. He also served as a member of the Committee for the Management of Academic and Educational Institutions of the Central Executive Committee of the Soviet Union (1928). At the same time, he worked as the head of the party construction department of the Pravda newspaper, and was a member of the editorial board of the newspaper (1930). Editor-in-chief of the magazines Shkola na Doma (1928), Litsom K Derevne (1928–1929), and Partiynoye Stroitelstvo (1929).

From 1931 to 1933 he was the Deputy People's Commissar of Education of the RSFSR.

In 1934-1936 he was a member of the Soviet Control Commission under the Council of People's Commissars of the Soviet Union, authorized representative of the commission for the Far Eastern Krai.

In 1936-1939 he served as Chairman of the All-Union Committee for Radiofication and Radio Broadcasting under the Council of People's Commissars of the Soviet Union.

He was elected as a delegate to the XII-XVI Congresses of the All-Union Communist Party (Bolsheviks).

In 1937, a number of articles were published in the newspaper Pravda criticizing the activities of the Radio Committee and its chairman Maltsev. He was arrested on November 14, 1939. On July 8, 1941, he was sentenced by the Military Collegium of the Supreme Court of the Soviet Union for participating in a counter-revolutionary espionage and sabotage organization to capital punishment. He was shot on July 28, 1941. He was rehabilitated on March 7, 1956.
