= Konstantin Eremeev =

Soviet revolutionary and journalist (1874–1931)

- Константин Еремеев
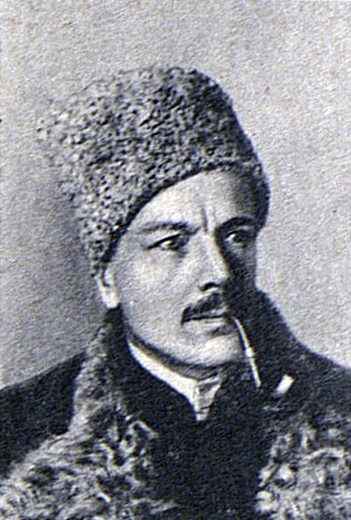
- Born: 6 June 1874; Russian Empire
- Died: 28 January 1931 (aged 56); Moscow, Soviet Union
- Resting place: Field of Mars
- Occupations: Journalist, social activist
- Known for: Petersburg Military District commander
- Awards: Order of the Red Star

Konstantin Stepanovich Eremeev (Russian: Константи́н Степа́нович Ереме́ев; 6 June 1874 – 28 January 1931) was a Russian Bolshevik revolutionary, Soviet military leader, journalist and newspaper editor.

== Life and revolutionary career ==
=== Early years and activity ===
Eremeev was born in Minsk in the family of a non-commissioned officer of peasant origins.

From 1893 to 1895 he served as a volunteer in an infantry regiment in Vilna and was promoted to a non-commissioned officer. A year later he joined the a social democratic organization in Vilna. In 1897 he was arrested, imprisoned in the Warsaw Fortress and later exiled to Urzhum then to Petrozavodsk for two years. In 1903 he joined the Bolshevik faction of the Russian Social Democratic Labour Party and was again arrested and exiled. In 1904, he fled from exile and emigrated. Eremeev returned to Russia in 1906.

After returning, he became involved in revolutionary work and was engaged in literary activity. From 1910 to 1914 he worked in the editorial offices of the newspapers Zvezda and Pravda. In the years 1915–1916 he edited the magazine Voprosy Strakhovaniya. From 1915, a member of the St. Petersburg Committee of the RSDLP. From 1916, he served on the committee of the All-Russian Zemstvo and City Union (Zemgor) in the rear of the 6th Army of the Northern Front. He led the military organization of the North Baltic Committee of the RSDLP (b) and conducted revolutionary propaganda among the soldiers.

=== During the Russian Revolution ===
After the February Revolution of 1917, he arrived in Petrograd and on March 4, Eremeev was appointed a member of the editorial board of Pravda, with a detachment of workers and soldiers seized the printing house of the newspaper Selskiy Vestnik, where Pravda began to be published on March 5. On March 27, he was introduced to the Russian Bureau of the Central Committee of the RSDLP. He worked in the editorial offices of Pravda and Soldatskaya Pravda and was a member of the Military Organization under the PC and the Central Committee of the RSDLP (b). In June, he took part in the All-Russian conference of front and rear military organizations of the RSDLP (b). During the seizure of the Pravda editorial office on July 5 by a detachment of the Provisional Government, Eremeev was arrested, but not identified as an editor and was soon released. After the July events, he hid in Sestroretsk. In August, again as an employee of Zemgor, he left for the Northern Front, worked in the North Baltic organization of the RSDLP (b).

In October Eremeev returned to Petrograd and participated in the formation of the Red Guard detachments, and led the revolutionary agitation in the garrison units. He was a member of the Petrograd Military Revolutionary Committee and on October 24 he headed the headquarters of a group of revolutionary troops. On October 25, he was introduced to the Field Headquarters of the Petrograd Military Revolutionary Committee, commanded detachments of the Red Guard and revolutionary soldiers during the storming of the Winter Palace from the Field of Mars. Took part in the liquidation of the Kerensky-Krasnov mutiny as the commissar of the group of Lieutenant Colonel Mikhail Muravyev and participated in the arrest of General Pyotr Krasnov. In early November, he was sent at the head of a combined detachment of revolutionary forces to help the armed uprising in Moscow.

=== After the Revolution in Soviet Russia ===
In November 1917 he became a member of the board of the People's Commissariat for Military Affairs of the RSFSR and from December 1917 to March 1918 he was temporarily acting as the commander-in-chief of the troops of the Petrograd military district. He was the founder and editor of the newspaper Army and Fleet of Workers' and Peasants' of Russia and was the author of the Red Star emblem. During the offensive of the German troops in February 1918, he was a member of the Revolutionary Defense Committee of Petrograd. Took part in the formation of the first units and formations of the Red Army. From April to May 1918 he was military commissar of the Petrograd Labor Commune.

In June 1918 he was head of the publishing house of the All-Russian Central Executive Committee in Moscow. During the Left SR revolt in July, he led the security of the Kremlin and the Bolshoi Theater which hosted the V All-Russian Congress of Soviets.

From 1919 to1922 he authorized the All-Russian Central Executive Committee and the Central Committee of the Russian Communist Party (b) for mobilization into the Red Army. In the summer of 1919 he was sent to the Southern Front and commanded the Voronezh fortified area.

In 1922 he was one of the founders and vice chairman of the state publishing house Gosizdat and editor of Rabochaya Gazeta. Eremeev was also the first chief editor of the first Soviet satirical magazine Krokodil.

From 1923 he was member of the RVS of the Baltic Fleet and from 1924 a member of the Revolutionary Military Council of the USSR. At the 13th Congress of the RCP (b) he was elected a member of the Central Control Commission. In 1925 he became Head of the Political Directorate of the Baltic Fleet. In December he was a delegate to the 14th Congress of the VKP (b).

In 1926 he led important assignments at the Revolutionary Military Council of the USSR. After his demobilization in 1926 and until the end of 1929 he was the representative of the JSC "Soviet Merchant Fleet" in France

From 1929 to 1931 he was editor of the Krasnaya Niva magazine.

During the later years of his life, he authored of a number of essays and memoirs on the October Revolution and the Civil War.

He died on 28 January 1931 of cardiac paralysis, while undergoing long-term treatment in the Kremlin hospital. On February 13, the urn with his ashes was brought to Leningrad and on the same day after the funeral ceremony was buried on the Field of Mars.

== Works ==
- Experienced. Stories and Memoirs. Petrozavodsk, 1964.
- Lenin and the Working class. Meetings with Ilyich, L., 1924.
- Flame. Episodes of the October Days, M. 1928. M. – L., 1930.

== Awards ==
Order of the Red Banner

== Memory ==
- In 1962, a street was named after KS Eremeev in Petrozavodsk .
- 7In 1974 one of the streets of Voronezh received the name of K.S. Eremeev.
- In 1960–1991. the creative work of the best journalists of the Karelian Autonomous Soviet Socialist Republic was awarded with the annual prize named after K. S. Eremeev.

== Literature ==
- American Civil War – Yokota / [under total. ed. N. V. Ogarkova ]. – M .: Military publishing house of the Ministry of Defense of the USSR, 1979, 678 p. – ( Soviet military encyclopedia : [in 8 volumes]; 1976–1980, vol. 3).
- Bolshevik-Pravdist. Memories of KS Eremeev. – M .: Pravda, 1965.
- Kondratyev F.G. Konstantin Eremeev. – Petrozavodsk: Karelian Book Publishing House, 1964.
- Karelia: encyclopedia: in 3 volumes / ch. ed. A.F. Titov. T. 1: A — Y. – Petrozavodsk, 2007, 400 p. – p. 325 ISBN 978-5-8430-0123-0 (vol. 1)
