= Boris Grigoriev =

Russian painter (1886–1939

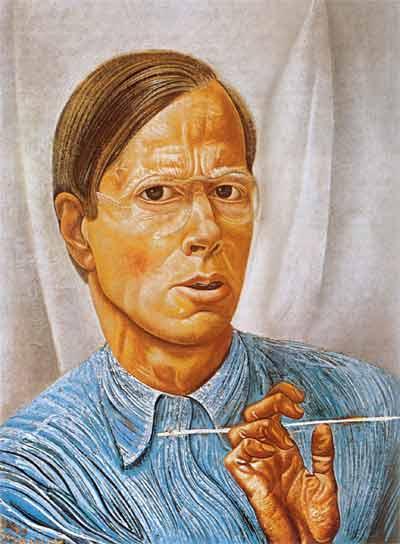
Self-portrait

Boris Grigoriev (Russian: Бори́с Дми́триевич Григо́рьев; 11 July 1886 – 7 February 1939) was a painter, graphic artist, and writer.

== Biography ==
Grigoriev was born in Rybinsk and studied at the Stroganov Art School from 1903 to 1907 with Dmitry Shcherbinovsky. Grigoriev went on to study at the Imperial Academy of Arts in Saint Petersburg under Alexander Kiselyov, Dmitry Kardovsky and Abram Arkhipov from 1907 to 1912. He began exhibiting his work in 1909 as a member of the Union of Impressionists group, and became a member of the World of Art movement in 1913. At that time he also wrote a novel, Young Rays.

After his return to Saint Petersburg in 1913 he became part of the Bohemian scene in St. Petersburg and was close to many artists and writers of the time, such as Sergey Sudeykin, Velimir Khlebnikov and the poet Anna Akhmatova, often painting their portraits.

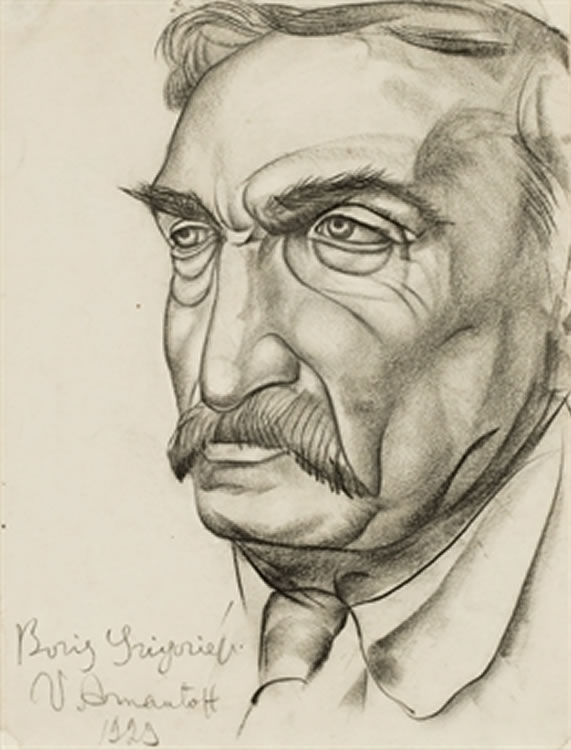
Drawing of Grigoriev by Russian-American artist Victor Arnautoff, 1929

Grigoriev was also interested in the Russian countryside, its peasants and village life. From 1916 to 1918 he created a series of paintings and graphic works, Russia (Raseja, Russian: Расея), depicting the poverty and strength of rural Russia. The album started with Grigoriev's poem To her stepsons. The album won a praise from influential art-critic Alexandre Benois. According to Benois, Grigoriev had shown the very essence of Russia in the period before the revolutionary upheaval. The leaderless workshop he organised in September 1919 led to the creation of the Society of Young Artists.

However, in 1919, Grigoriev travelled and lived abroad in many countries including Finland, Germany, France, the United States, Central and South Americas. Grigoriev lived for a time in Paris, where he attended the Académie de la Grande Chaumière. In Paris he was strongly influenced by Paul Cézanne. It was either at this time, or while he lived in New York – there are conflicting reports – that he had an affair with the young painter Martha Visser't Hooft, then Martha Hamlin.

In 1934, he published his poem Russia (Расея) in the American Russian-language newspaper Novoye Russkoye Slovo. The poem was a poetic reflection of his famous Russia series of paintings. He also wrote a poem, America, which was not published until 2003.

Grigoriev died in Cagnes-sur-Mer in 1939.

== Some works ==
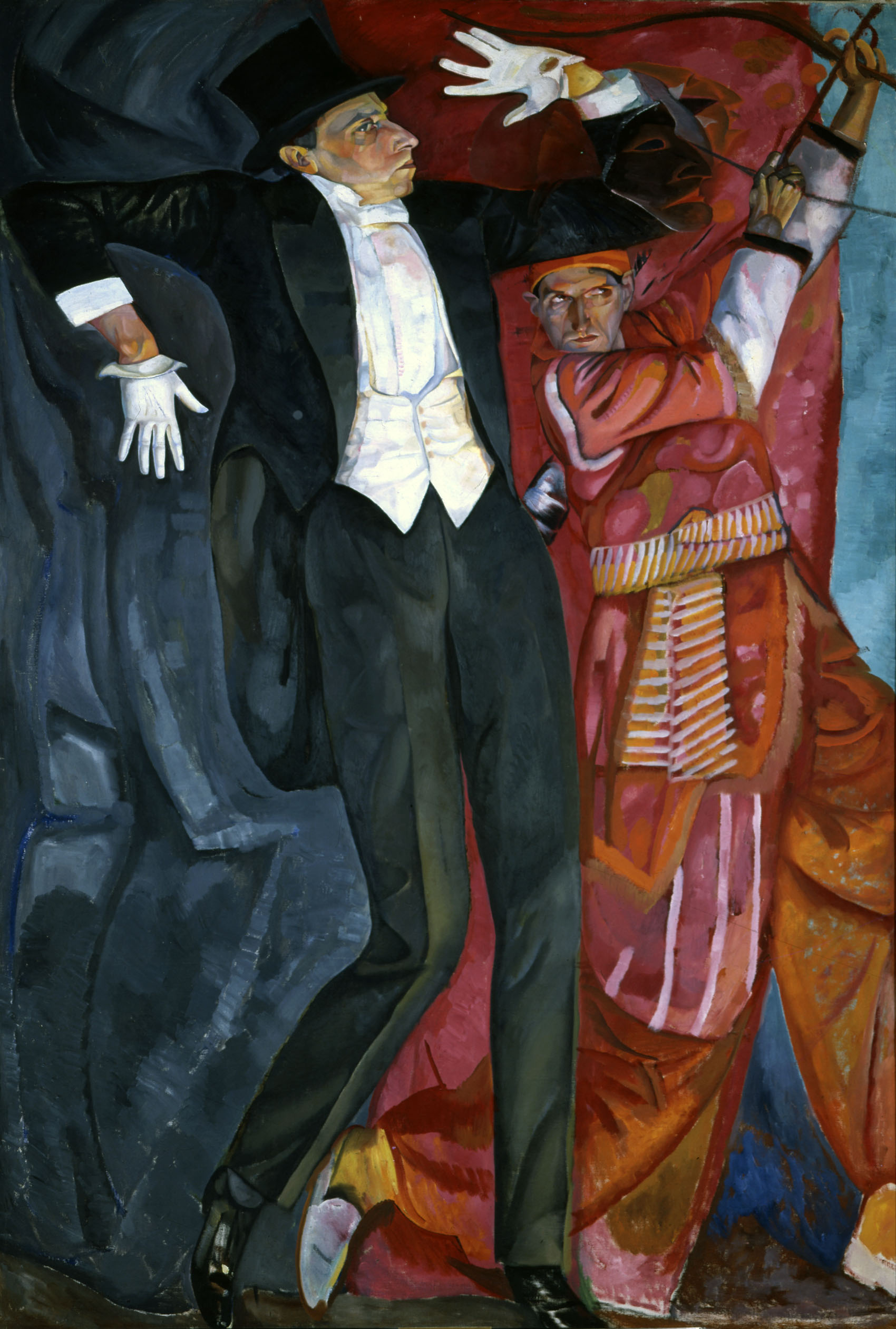
Double portrait of Vsevolod Meyerhold, 1916

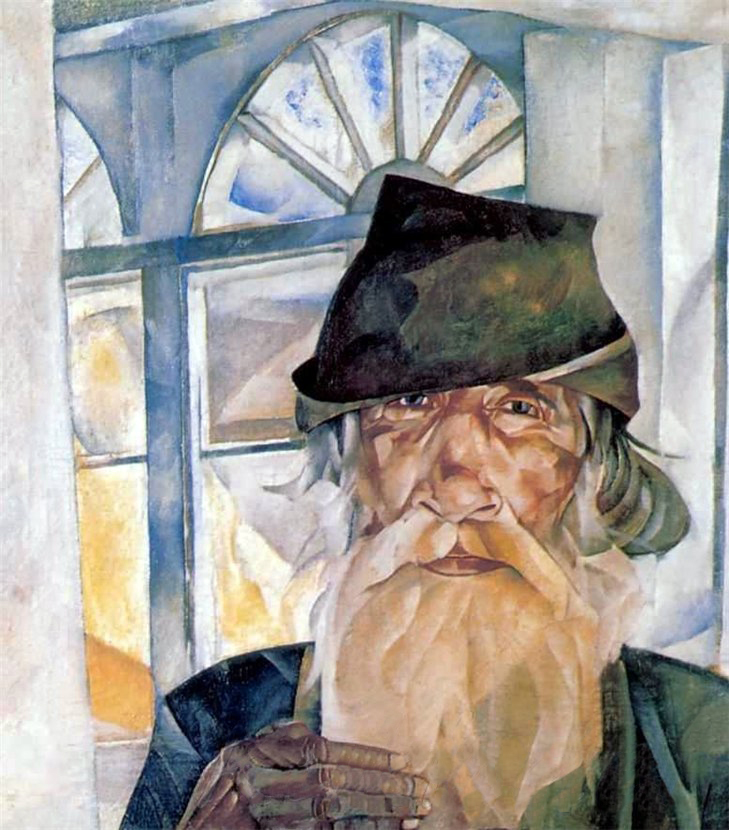
An old man from Olonets

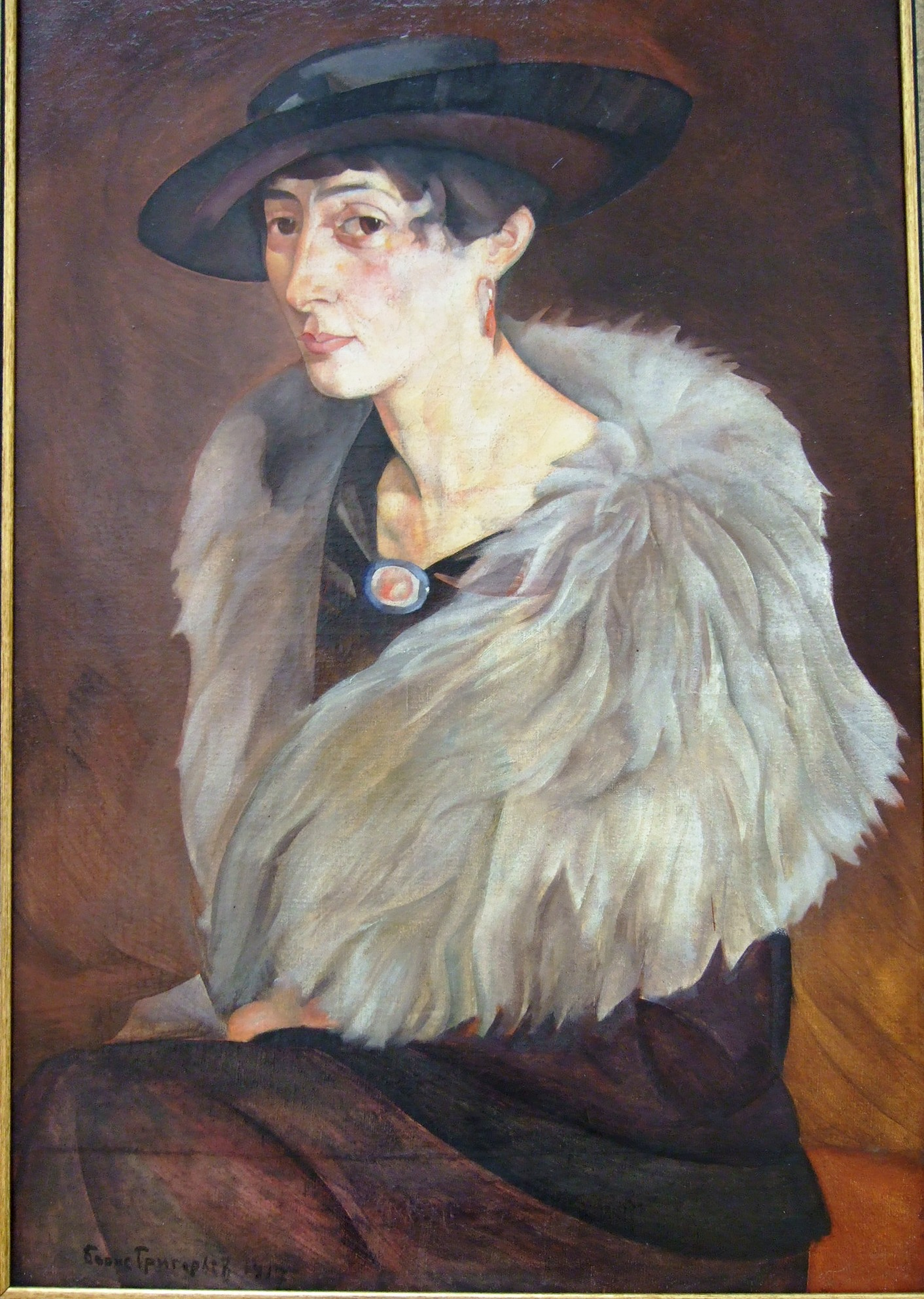
Portrait of Anna Grilikhes, 1917

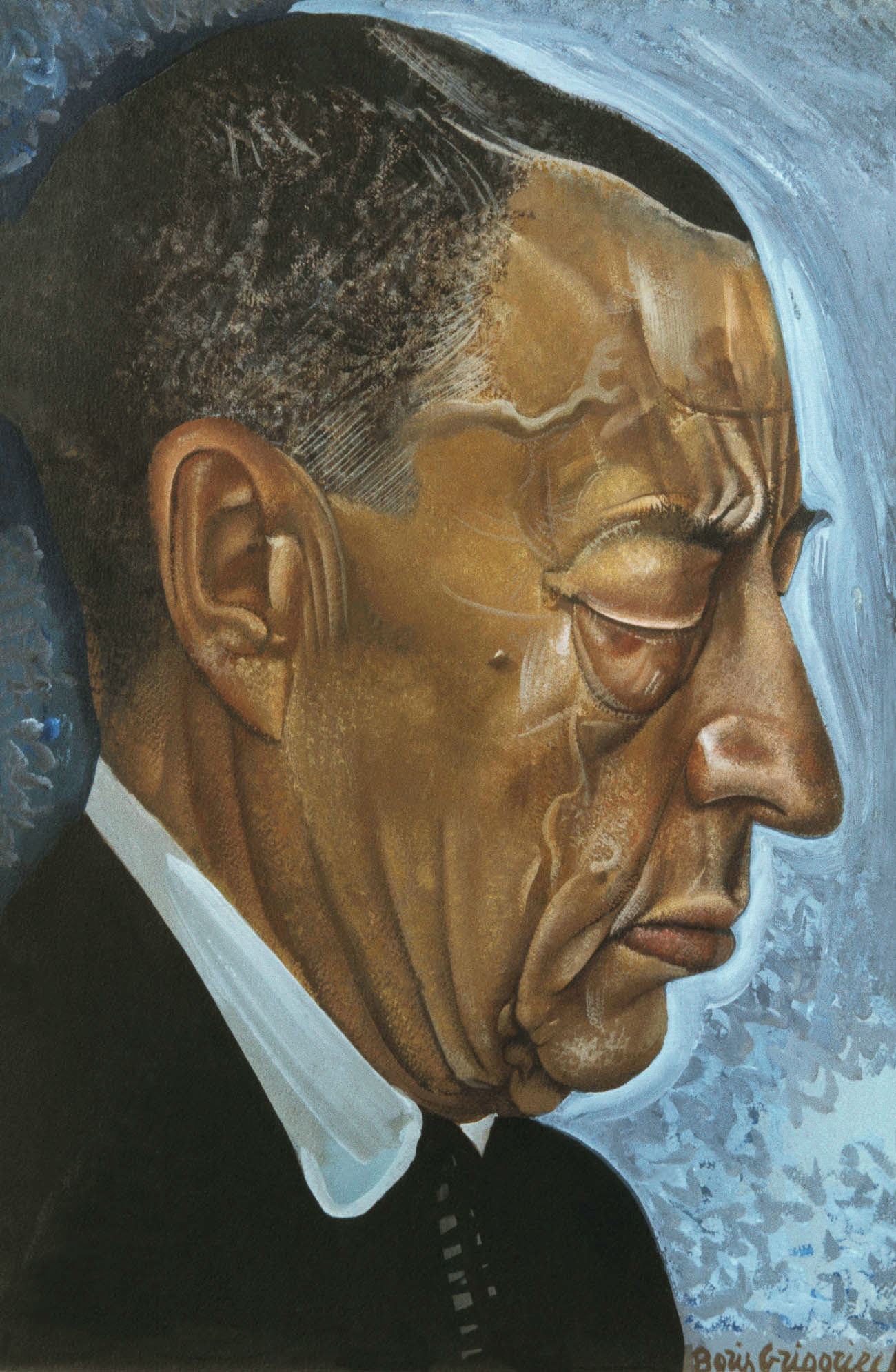
Sergei Rachmaninoff
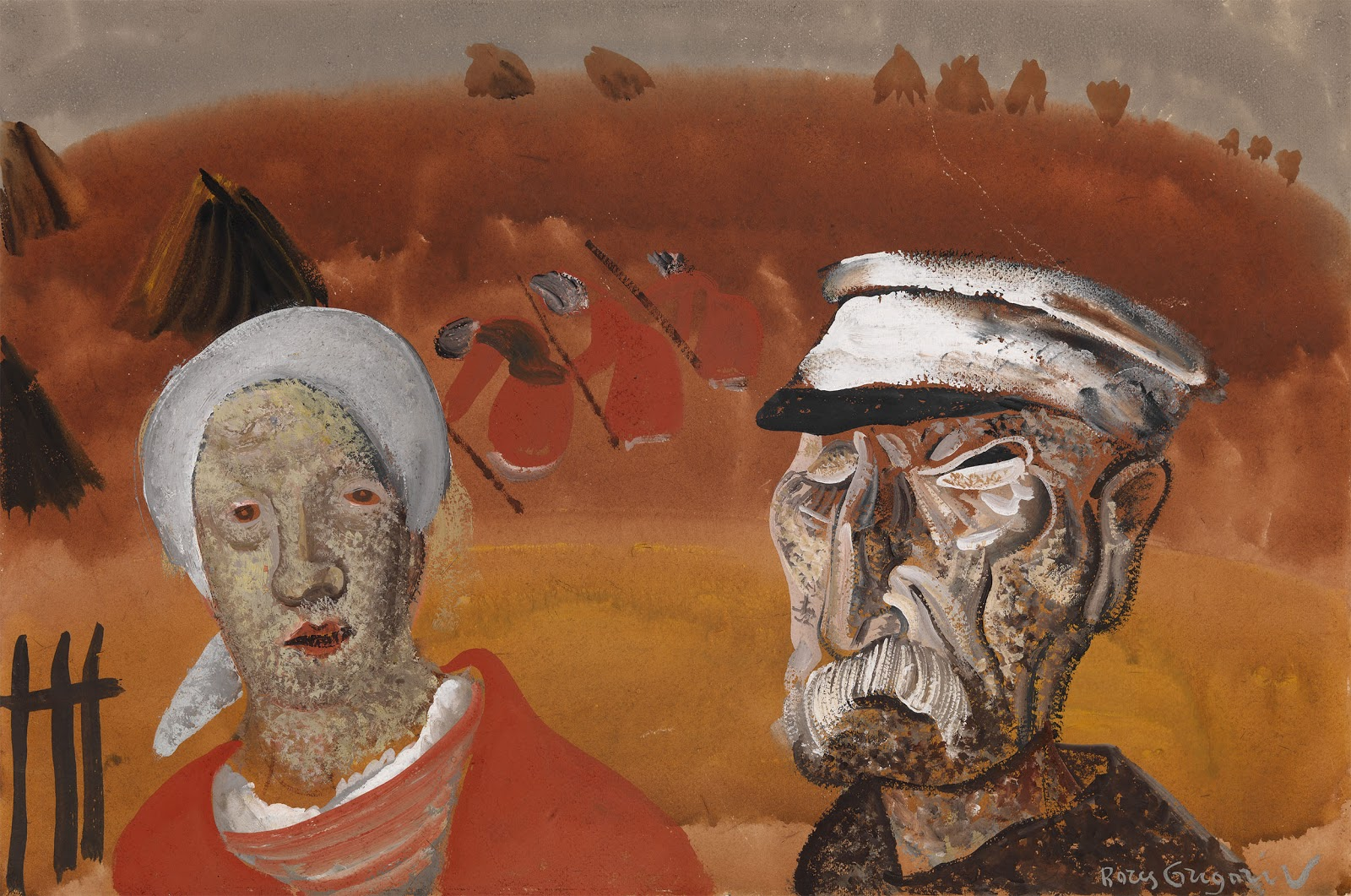
Peasants in the Field, 1920

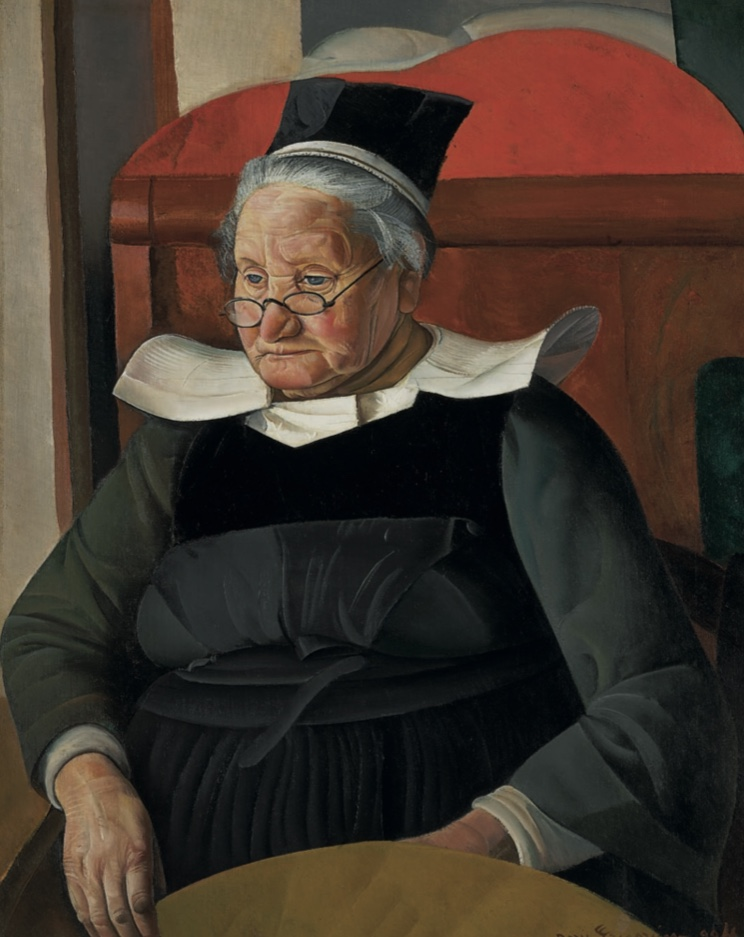
La Mère Agathe, 1925

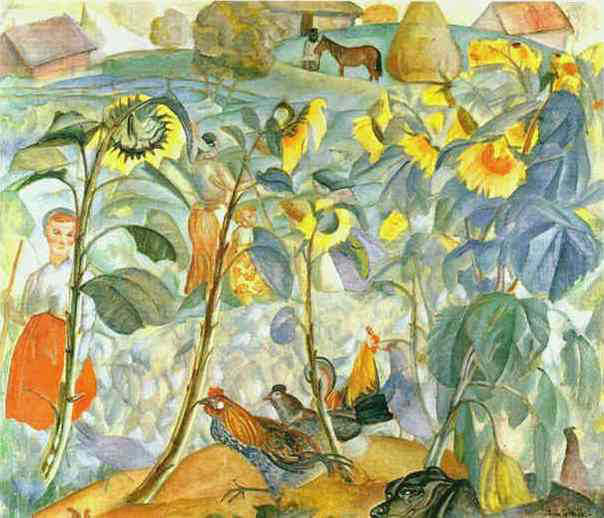
Sunflowers, 1917–1919

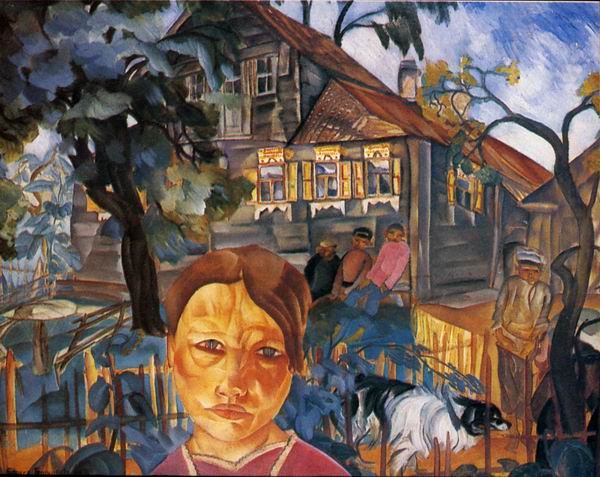
Village, 1918

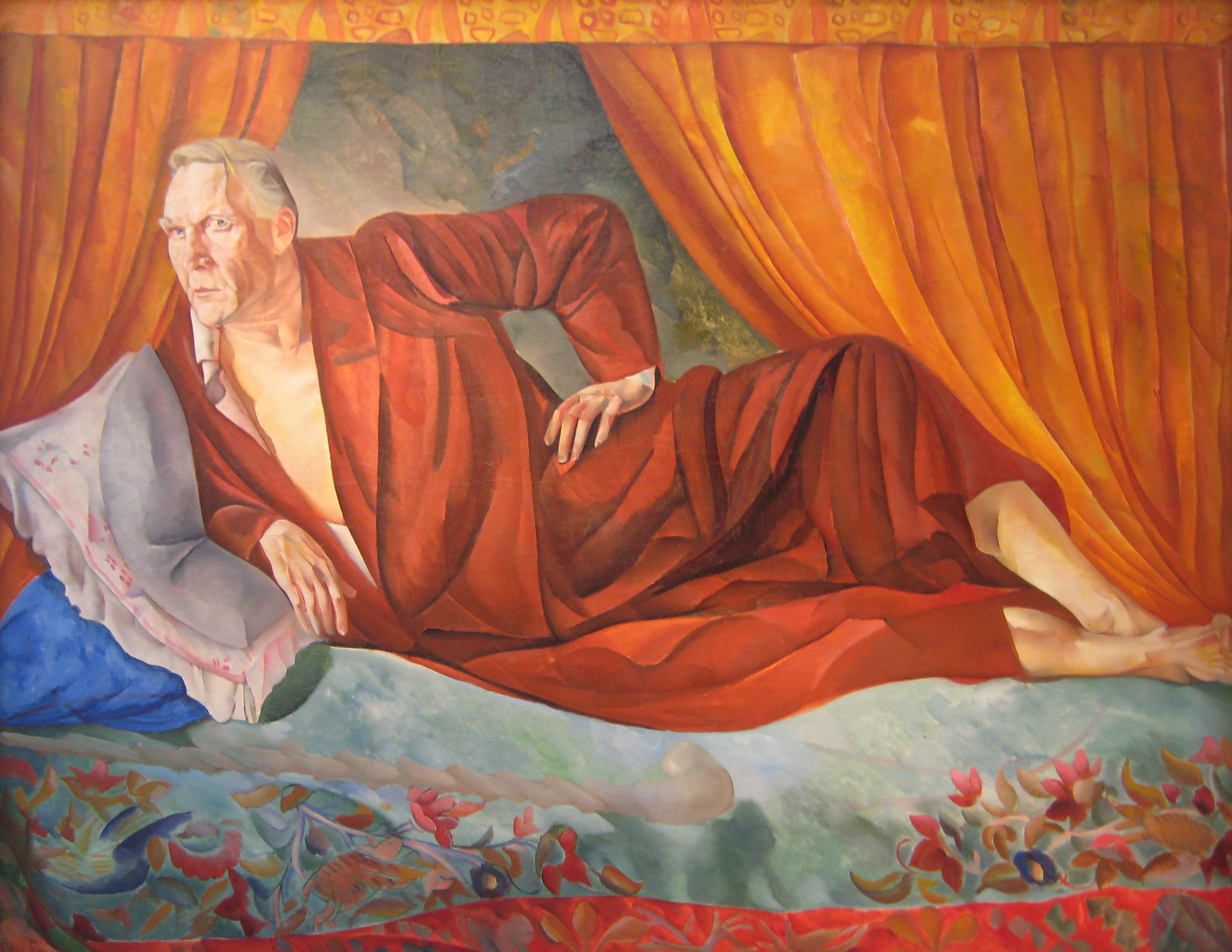
Feodor Chaliapin, 1918
