= Rabochaya Gazeta (1922) =

Soviet Bolshevik newspaper, 1922–1932

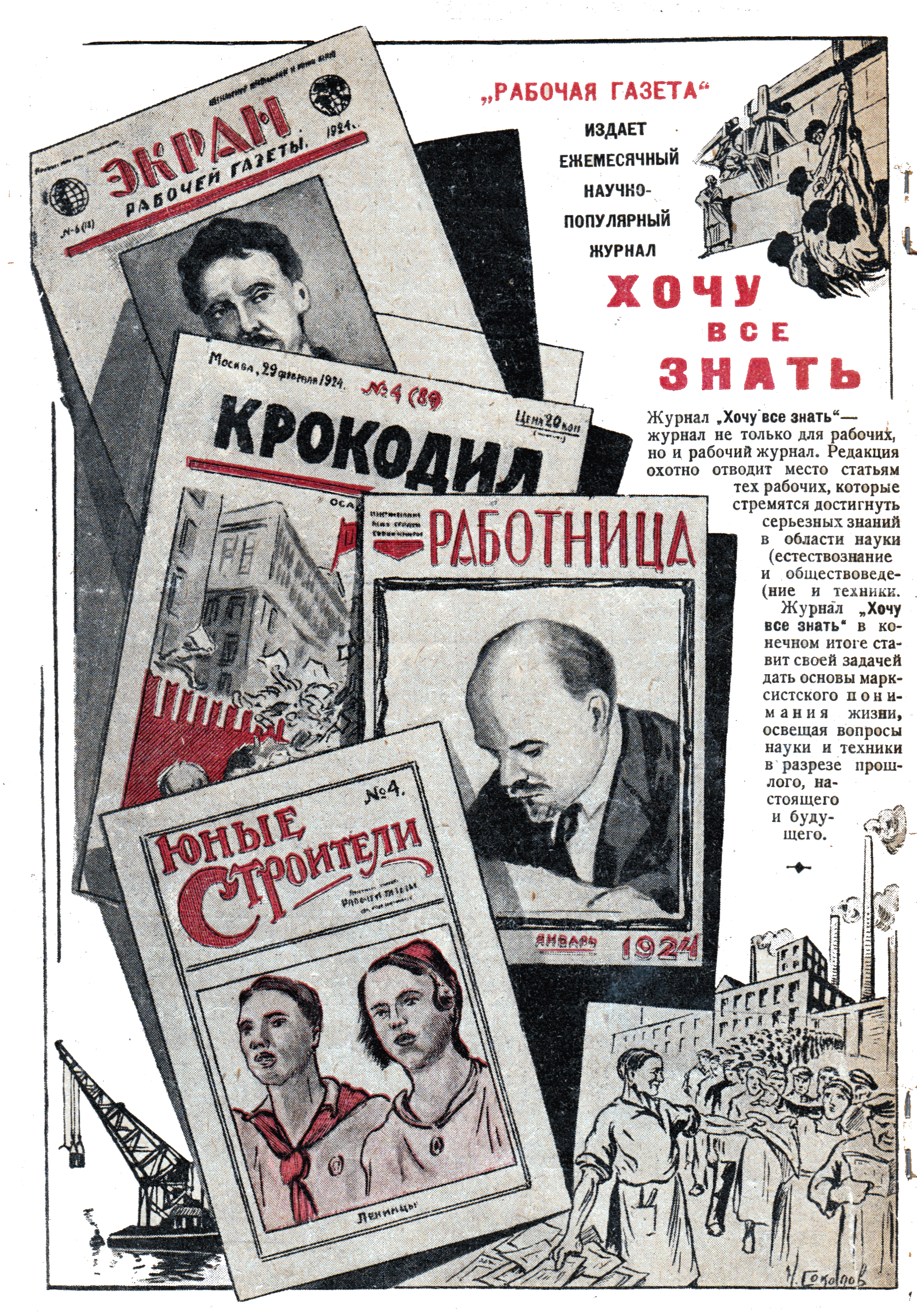
Supplements to the Rabochaya Gazeta, 1924

Rabochaya Gazeta (Russian: «Рабочая газета», pronounced [rɐˈbot͡ɕɪjə ɡɐˈzʲetə], romanized: Workers' Newspaper; from No. 1 to No. 97 – Rabochiy) was a Soviet newspaper which was an organ of the Central Committee of the All-Union Communist Party (Bolsheviks), published from 1922 to 1932.

== History ==
The newspaper was founded on 1 March 1922 in Moscow. Its first chief editor was Konstantin Eremeev (1922–1928) and later at various times it was edited by F. Ya. Kon, N. I. Smirnov, K. Maltsev and V. Filatov.

By 1927, the circulation of the newspaper exceeded 300 thousand copies. The newspaper played an important role in the implementation of the Party's policy of mobilising the forces of the working class of the USSR to fulfil the tasks of socialist construction and in the developing of troops and socialist emulation.

A number of magazines began to appear as supplements to the newspaper, many of them eventually became independent publications. Most famously magazines such as Krokodil, Rabotnitsa, Murzilka, Soviet Ekran and some others.

The last issue of the newspaper was published on 29 January 1932. After 1932, the employees of the closed newspaper moved to the newly formed editorial office of the newspaper "Water Transport", which became the organ of the USSR People's Commissariat for Water Transport and the Central Committee of the trade union of water workers.

== See also ==
Rabochaya Gazeta (1897)
