= Šluota =

Luthuanian satire and humour magazine

Šluota (literally "broom") was a Lithuanian satire and humour magazine which was published, with hiatuses, from 1934 to 2004. Until 1990, it was published by the Communist Party of Lithuania and contained mainly Communist propaganda. It was the only humour magazine in the Lithuanian SSR and it was popular and well received. According to research of Neringa Klumbytė, artists and writers attempted to subvert the Communist ideology using the Aesopian language in the 1970s and 1980s.

== History ==
Circulation of Šluota
Year	Circulation	Ref
1934	300–400	
1940	10,000	
1956	20,000	
1957	40,000	
1966	55,600	
1976	106,500	
1981	108,400	
1989	119,100	
1994	8,700	
1997	3,000	

In 1934–1936, Šluota was published by the Lithuanian Communist Party. Since the party was outlawed in the interwar Lithuania, the publication was also illegal and appeared irregularly. The magazine was initiated by a group of students at the Kaunas Art School who maintained contacts with the Lithuanian Red Aid. The first issue had 16 pages and measured 32 cm × 23 cm (12.6 in × 9.1 in). A total of seven issues appeared during this period.

In 1940–1941, during the first Soviet occupation of Lithuania, it was published by the Soviet Agitprop and later by the Tiesa ("Truth") publishing house. It is suggested that the long post-World War II hiatus was related to the death of its editor, Stepas Žukas, who restored the magazine in 1940 and no one else had the energy to convince the Communist officials to restore it again. Until 1941, the magazine was published in Kaunas.

In 1956–1990, Šluota was published by the publishers of the Central Committee of the Communist Party of the Lithuanian SSR in Vilnius. It was a popular, well-liked, and profitable 16-page magazine published every two weeks. After the restoration of the independence of Lithuania, it was published by the company Šluota in 1990–1998 and by the company Piketo projektai in 2000–2004. In 1995, it was reorganized as a monthly newspaper.

== Content ==
The magazine published satirical, humorous writings, jokes and cartoons and caricatures on social, political, cultural and household topics. One or its recurring joke characters is Kindziulis.

The title of the journal reflected its revolutionary origins. It symbolized the intent to sweep away bourgeoisie, capitalists, clerics, etc. in a communist revolution. Issues published in 1940–1941 made fun of various "enemies of the people" and representatives of the old regime of President Antanas Smetona, including speculators, landlords, intellectuals, and bureaucrats. It also pointed out common problems of everyday life (such as laziness, wastefulness, alcoholism) and celebrated the new regime and building the new socialist society.

Issues published after 1956 no longer focused on external enemies (i.e. bourgeoisie), but turned the satire inward and pointed out flaws of the Soviet society. The cast of characters now included drunk and procrastinating workers, Soviet bureaucrats, directors of factories and collective farms, but not party or government officials. Šluota received numerous letters from readers that complained or reported on various disapproved actions (such as alcoholism). In 1963, the office of correspondence received 2,234 letters, 230 of which were published.

Šluota devoted a third to a half of its content to cartoons and other illustrations. In the 1970s and 1980s there were around sixty artists who contributed to the magazine on somewhat regular basis. The artists were not members of the Communist Party and generally avoided contributing political or anti-religious cartoons despite higher commissions. Since it was easier to be ambiguous in a cartoon than in written text, some cartoons could be interpreted as anti-Soviet. For example, a cartoon of a tank aiming at the white peace dove could be interpreted as depicting either an American or Soviet tank. An ambiguous image printed as the cover for Lenin's 100th anniversary resulted in the entire issue being destroyed. Neringa Klumbytė characterized such subversive actions as "neither an example of clear collaboration, nor of open resistance, but rather a close interaction with power through dialogue, negotiation, acceptance, and rejection".

== Editors ==
Magazines editors were:

- 1934–1935: Boleslovas Adomas Motuza Matuzevičius
- 1936: Bronius Žekonis
- 1940–1941: Stepas Žukas
- 1956–1985: Juozas Bulota
- 1985–1990: Adolfas Strakšys
- 1990: Rytis Tilvytis
- 1991–1998: Albertas Lukša
- 2000–2004: Jonas Lenkutis

== See also ==
- Krokodil – Soviet satirical magazine published in Russia
