= Zvezda (newspaper) =

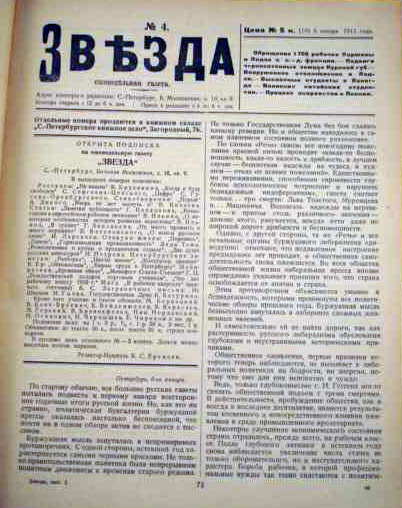
The newspaper Zvezda

Zvezda (Star) (Russian: Звезда) was a Russian newspaper which subsequently was incorporated into Pravda. Originally it was the legal organ of the Duma's Social Democratic faction. The paper had separate sections on “In the World of Labor,” “Workers’ Life,” “The Workers’ Movement,” “The State Duma,” “Press Survey,” “Chronicle,” “Around and About Russia,” “The Provinces,” and “Life Abroad.” The newspaper was published from December 29, 1910, to May 5, 1912.

== Editorial control ==
The first editors were Vladimir Bonch-Bruyevich (Bolshevik), N. I. lordanskii (Menshevik), and I. P. Pokrovskii (from the Social Democratic faction of the Third State Duma). N. G. Poletaev (Bolshevik) also played a major part in its production. From October 1911 the Bolsheviks had complete control of the paper and N. N. Baturin, M. S. Ol’minskii and K. S. Eremeev were on the editorial board. Among notable contributors to the newspaper were A. I. Elizarova-Ulyanova, V. V. Vorovsky, V. I. Nevsky, Demyan Bedny, A. A. Bogdanov and Maksim Gorky.

== Publication details ==
It was launched on Dec. 16 (29), 1910 and appeared weekly until Jan. 21 (Feb. 3), 1912. It was then bi-weekly until Mar. 8 (21), 1912 after which it came out three times a week. From Feb. 26 (Mar. 10), 1912 it was known as Nevskaia zvezda the last issue of which appeared on Oct. 5 (18), 1912.

== Supersession by Pravda ==
Pravda officially began publication on 5 May 1912. Joseph Stalin recalled how Pravda was planned by himself, a member of the Bolshevik Central Committee, Pokrovsky and Poletayev, both members of the Duma, and Olminsky and Baturin. "The only difference between Zvezda and Pravda was that the latter, unlike the former, did not address itself to the advanced workers, but to the broad masses of the working class", Stalin remarked.
