= Vladimir Antonov-Saratovsky =

Russian revolutionary, Soviet jurist and statesman

Vladimir Pavlovich Antonov-Saratovsky (Russian: Владимир Павлович Антонов-Саратовский; 31 July 1884 – 3 August 1965) was a Russian revolutionary, Soviet jurist, and statesman.

== Biography ==
Antonov was born in to the family of a minor nobleman and employee of the Saratov district court. He joined the Russian Social Democratic Labour Party in 1902 and was a participant in 1905 Russian Revolution and was a member of the Saratov committee of the RSDLP.

In 1908 he was arrested and in Moscow and sentenced to prison for revolutionary activities. After his release he organized various newspapers. After the February Revolution he was elected chairman of the Saratov Soviet and elected as a representative of the Bolsheviks for the Russian Constituent Assembly.

With the beginning of the October Revolution, he participated in the establishment of Soviet power in Saratov, led the detachments of the Red Guards. In 1918, chairman of the Council of People's Commissars of the self-proclaimed Saratov Federal Republic. In 1919 he was Chairman of the executive committee of the Kursk Provincial Council and a member of the board of the NKVD of the RSFSR, member of the Revolutionary Tribunal of the 13th Army of the Southern Front and organizer of the revolutionary committees on the Southern Front. Participant in operations against units of the Orenburg Cossack army under the command of Alexander Dutov.

From January 1920 he was Chairman of the Donbass Provincial Revolutionary Committee and in 1920-1921 Antonov-Saratovsky was People's Commissar of Internal Affairs of Ukrainian SSR and was authorized to combat Makhno's detachments.

From 1921 to 1923 he was the rector of the Sverdlov Communist University. From 1923 to 1926, he was the chairman of the Commission for Legislative Assumptions under the Council of People's Commissars of the Soviet Union. From 1923 to 1938, Antonov-Saratovsky was a member of the Supreme Court of the Soviet Union. In 1924, he was involved in the Commission of the Presidium of the Central Executive Committee of thexon the development of basic laws and also participated in the development of the foundations of the judiciary and legal proceedings in the USSR and the Union republics; in 1925 he was included in the Commission of the Presidium of the Central Executive Committee of the USSR for the consideration of the draft Code of Basic Labor Laws. He worked in the Ministry of Justice and was a member of the Presidium of the All-Russian Central Executive Committee.

Antonov-Saratovsky was a member of the court at the Shakhty trial and in the case of the Union Bureau of Mensheviks, as well as in the case of the Industrial Party trial.

Antonov-Saratovsky was the author of a number of articles and brochures on jurisprudence, some of them translated into foreign languages (in particular, his 1931 article on the Menshevik trial). He also wrote memoirs based on his experience in the revolutionary movement. He retired in 1944 and was a personal pensioner from then.

By decree of the Presidium of the Supreme Soviet of the USSR of December 20, 1955, he was awarded the Order of Lenin.

He died in Moscow on August 3, 1965. He was buried at the Saratov Resurrection Cemetery next to the grave of Nikolai Chernyshevsky.
