= Tolstovka =

Long shirt associated with Leo Tolstoy

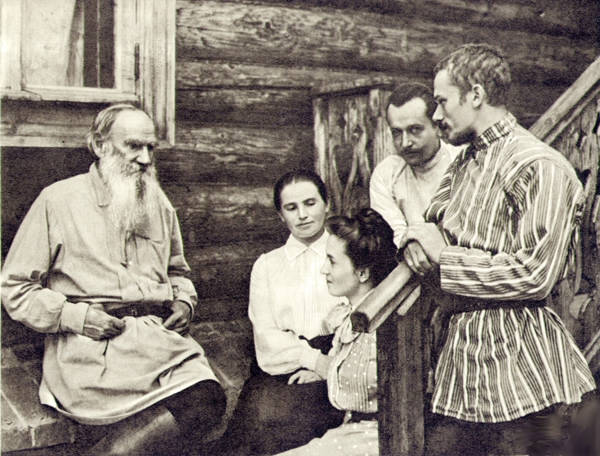
Leo Tolstoy wearing a tolstovka

Tolstovka (Tolstoy shirt, blouse à la Tolstoï) was a type of spacious long shirt worn by Leo Tolstoy in his later years. It was worn either loose or with a belt.

Russian art historian Raisa Kirsanova notes that memoirists note that in his youth Tolstoy preferred a fashionable attire, but since 1860 he preferred plain long shirts (Note: These shirts are called bluza (блуза) in Russian, while a woman's blouse is called Блузка.) when at home in his manor. This style was followed by Tolstoyans, which modelled the shirt by famous portraits of Tolstoy, in which rather different styles of the Tolstoy shirt may be seen. In early years after the Russian Revolution, the popularity of tolstovka was due to its democratic appearance (in contrast to "bourgeois" suits), rather than to the numbers of Tolstovists. By 1930 its popularity faded, with the exception of artists, who continued to use it as a work bluza since the 19th century.

Some erroneously assert that the writer Tolstoy was wearing kosovorotka; the latter considerably differed from a tolstovka; in particular the cut was down the middle of the chest, rather than shifted to a side.

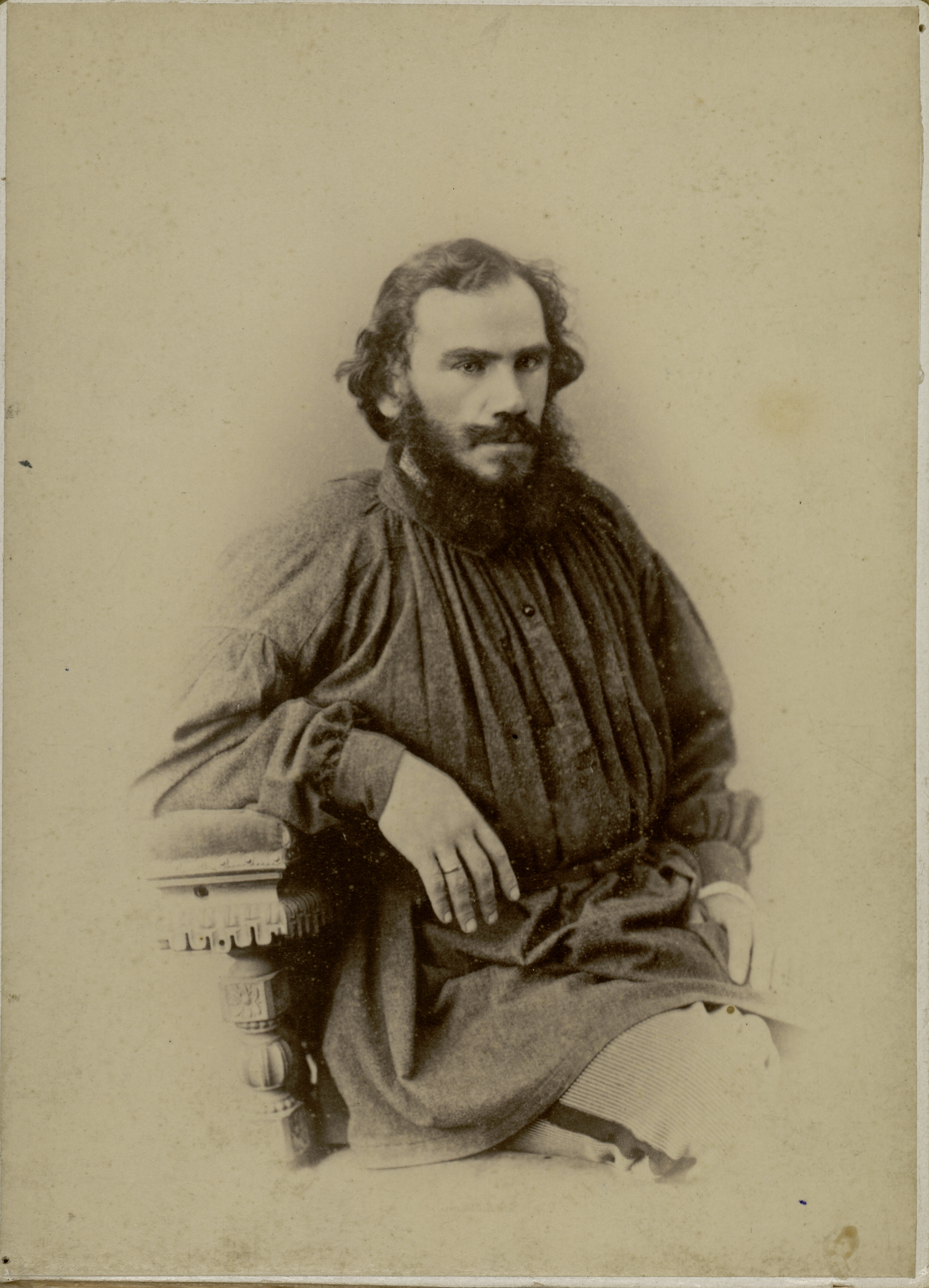
Photo, 1868

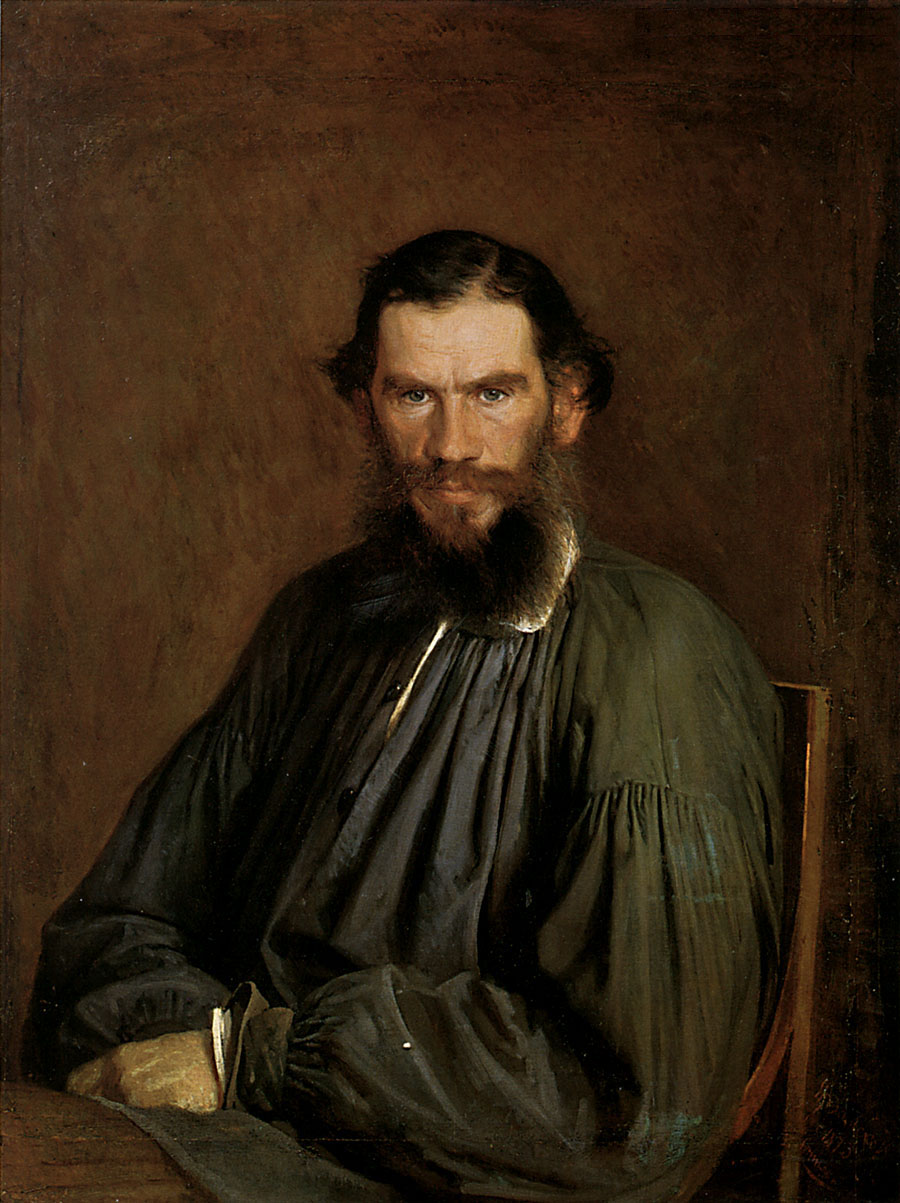
By Ivan Kramskoi, 1873

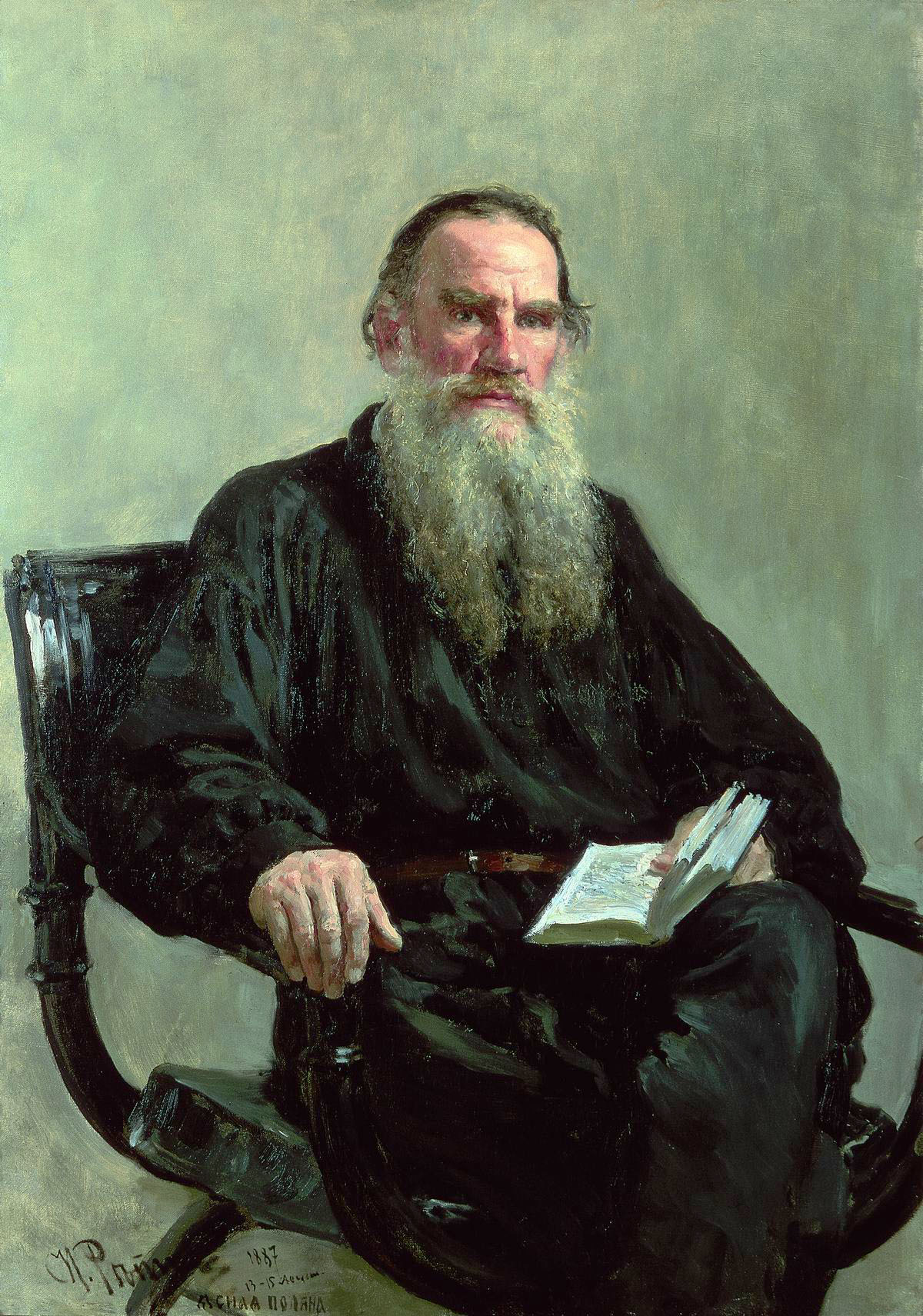
by Ilya Repin, 1887

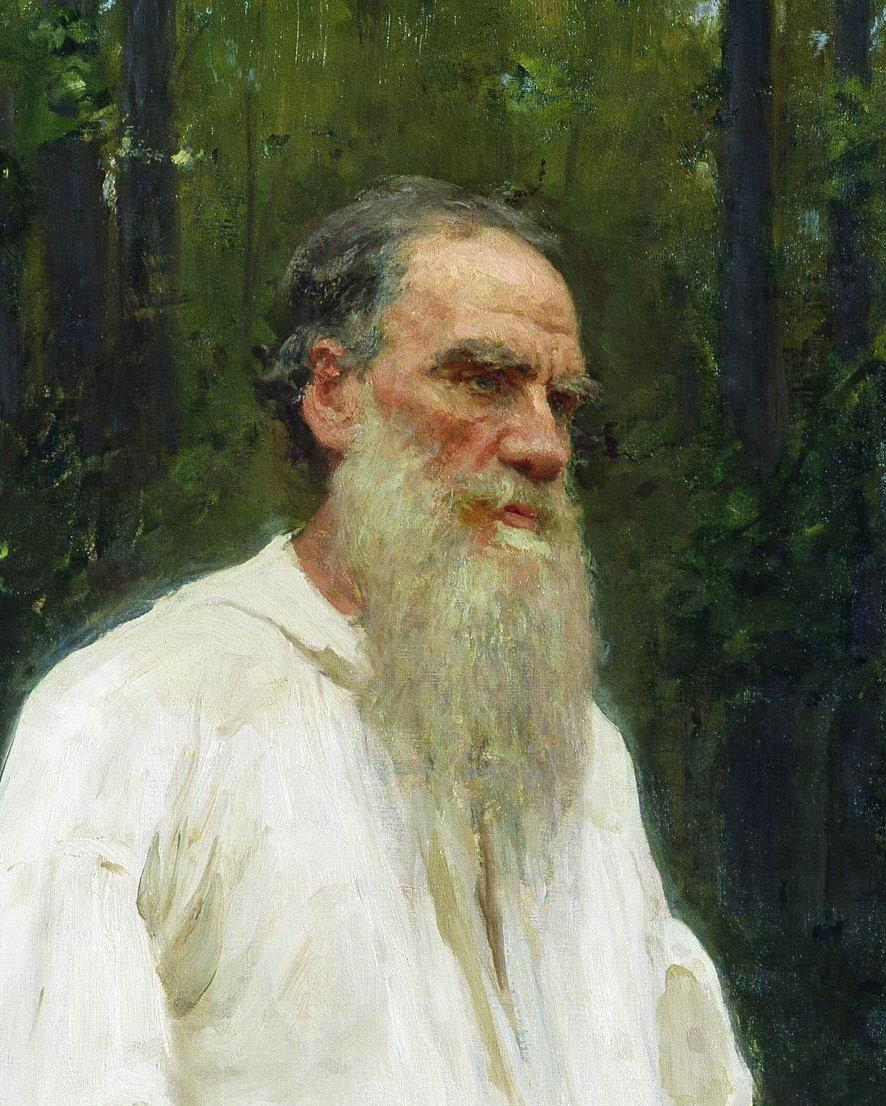
by Repin, 1901 (cropped)

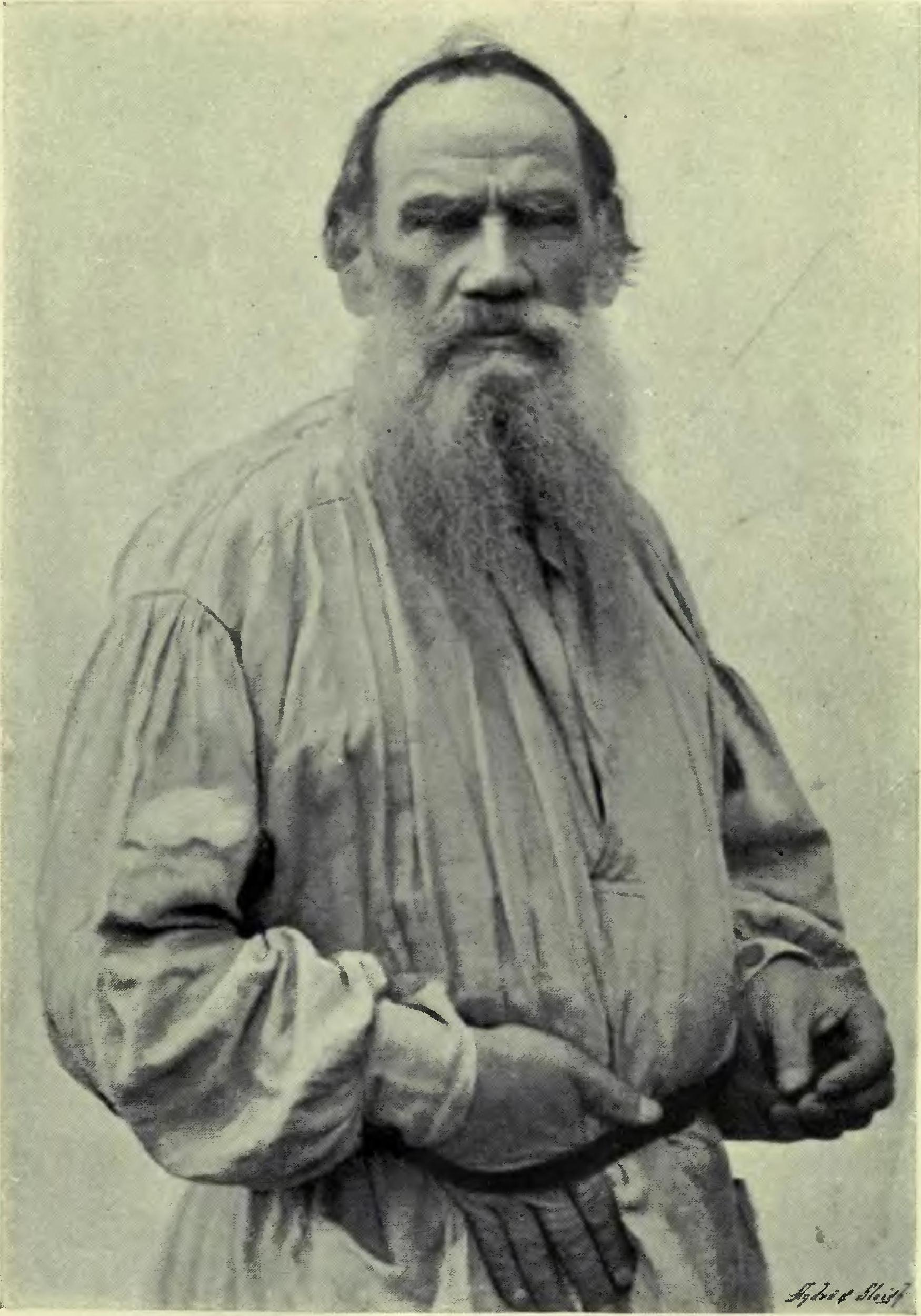
1895, printed in several books

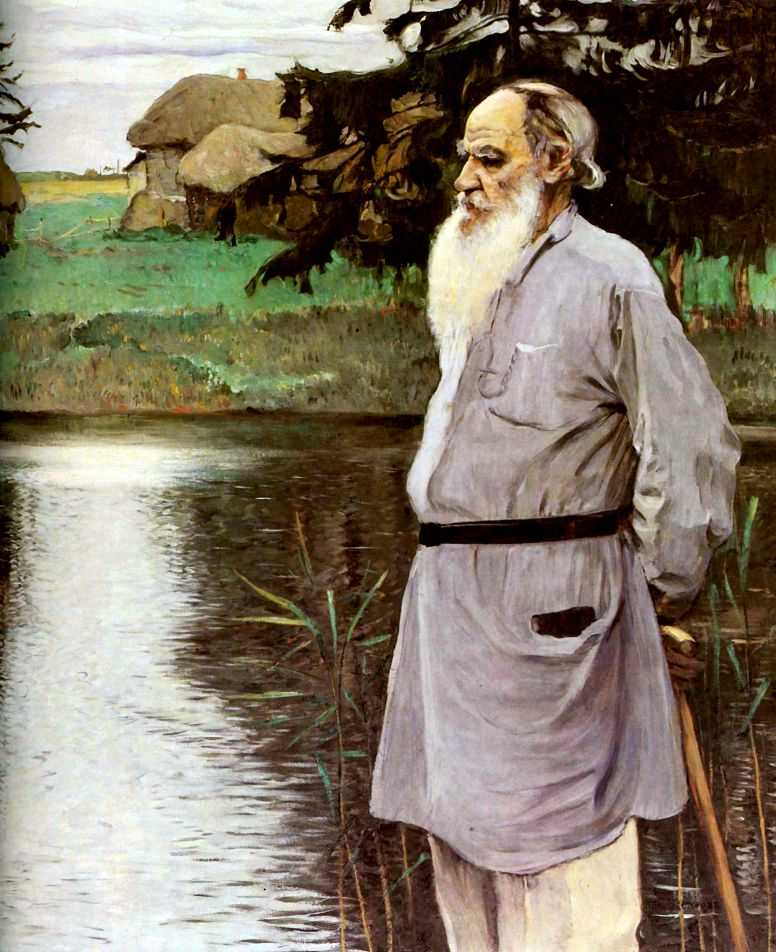
by Mikhail Nesterov, 1907
