= Martha Visser't Hooft =

American painter and teacher

- Born: Martha Hamlin; 1906; Buffalo, New York, U.S.
- Died: 1994 (aged 87–88); Buffalo, New York, U.S.
- Education: Académie Julian
- Known for: Painting
- Movement: Modernism

Martha Visser't Hooft (née Hamlin) (1906–1994) was an American painter and teacher. She was known for her modernist paintings, as well as contributions to artists societies in Buffalo, New York.

== Early life ==
Visser't Hooft (née Hamiln) was born in Buffalo, New York, to a family of wealthy intellectuals. Deeply involved in all aspects of civic life, her parents, Chauncey J. Hamlin and Emily Gray Hamlin, had interests and involvements including the arts and sciences as well as activism and community service.

== Education ==
Visser't Hooft left for Paris in 1920 to study art at the Académie Julian. She left for New York in 1926 to study at the Parsons School of Design, shortly after switching to the John Murray Anderson School of Theater Design. During this time, she had an affair with the Russian artist Boris Grigoriev, although there are conflicting reports of whether this happened in New York or Paris.

== Early career ==
Following her schooling, Visser't Hooft travelled with her parents and sister, Mary Hamlin Goodwin, to Taos, New Mexico in 1928. Ultimately, her sister would settle in Taos with her family, where she would become a member of the Taos Art Colony. Visser't Hooft subsequently returned on several occasions to visit her, meeting artists such as Georgia O'Keeffe, Andrew Dasburg, and Frieda Lawrence. At this time, she also made several paintings of the landscape.

== Mid-career ==
In 1933, Visser’t Hooft co-founded the Patteran Society, created as a progressive arts society in Buffalo.

Through the late 1940s and 1950s, her work exhibited internationally through the Contemporary Arts Gallery in New York.

From 1956 to 1958 she taught at the University of Buffalo.

== Late career ==
A solo retrospective of Visser't Hooft's paintings and drawings was held in 1973 at the Charles Burchfield Center. Her work was later exhibited in the same venue as part of a Patteran Society group show in 1975.

In 1991, a major retrospective of her works was held at the David Anderson Gallery in Buffalo. For this show an illustrated catalogue was produced by The Poetry/Rare Books Collection and The State University of New York at Buffalo. Essays were contributed by Robert J. Bertholf and Albert L. Michaels, and included commentary by the artist.

== Collections ==
Visser't Hooft's paintings are collected across the United States. Public collections include the Albright Knox Art Gallery, the Whitney Museum of American Art, the Burchfield Penney Art Center, and the Columbia Museum of Art.

== Personal life ==
Visser't Hooft married Franciscus Visser 't Hooft, a Dutch chemist, in 1928. They had three children.

== Legacy ==
Her archives are held by the Burchfield Penney Art Center in Buffalo, New York.
