= Kindziulis =

Stock character of Lithuanian humor

Kindziulis is a fictional character from Lithuanian joke cycle commonly known as "Here came Kindzulis" (Lithuanian: Čia priėjo Kindziulis). The punch lines of the jokes of this cycle start with the standard phrase "Here comes Kinzsiulis and says:..." The Kindziulis character was created by theatre director Vytautas Mikalauskas and these jokes, written by collective efforts, were regularly printed in the Lithuanian satirical magazine Šluota.

Journalist and writer Juozas Bulota, a long-time editor-in-chief of Šluota, published the collections of jokes titled Čia priėjo Kindziulis several times (1970, 1972, 1982). Other people, printed books with the same title as well, such as Pranas Raščius and Leopoldas Stanevičius (Čia priėjo Kindziulis (2002), Kindziulis byloja: arba ant bėgių gulsim, arba išpuikusius ponus pulsim (2021), Atsargiai: Kindziulis viską mato! (2021)).

Kindziulis jokes have become less popular in post-Soviet times.

== Examples ==
A man is lost in the woods without a compass and is in despair: "How do I know the directions now?" Here comes Kindziulis and says: "That's very easy. Just stand facing North, then South is behind you, West is on your left and East is on your right!"

During the Communist times many of them were an element of Communist propaganda:

A tourist asks, why the Bundestag building is round?
Here comes Kindziulis and says: Where have you seen a circus of a different shape?

Sample jokes from the Union of Lithuanian Journalists website:

Two citizens are talking: As the building materials became more expensive, it is simply impossible to build a house or an apartment!
Here comes Kindziulis and advises: Build yurts.

A company boss says to an applicant:
- I hire only people with exemplary behavior.
Here comes Kindziulis and says:
- Well, he was just released from prison ahead of time for the exemplary behavior.
