= Rabochaya Gazeta =

Illegal social democratic newspaper in Kyiv, Russian Empire (1897)

Rabochaya Gazeta (Russian: «Рабочая газета», romanized: rɐˈbot͡ɕɪjə ɡɐˈzʲetə, lit. ''Workers' Newspaper'') was an illegal social democratic newspaper in the Russian Empire, published in 1897 in Kyiv. It was an organ of the Russian Social Democratic Labour Party (RSDLP). The editors included Boris L. Eidelman, P. L. Tuchapsky and N. A. Vigdorchik.

== History ==
The social democrats grouped around Rabochaya Gazeta maintained contact with the Emancipation of Labour group and the Saint Petersburg League of Struggle for the Emancipation of the Working Class. They also helped preparations for the convocation of the first party congress.

Two issues were published: the first on 3 September [O.S. 22 August] and the second on 1 January 1898 [O.S. 20 December 1897] (marked as November).

In March 1898, the First Congress of the RSDLP recognised Rabochaya Gazeta as the official party organ. The publication of the newspaper ceased on 22 March [O.S. 10 March] 1898, since the Central Committee members elected at the congress were arrested and the printing press was destroyed. The third issue, which was ready for the compositor, was seized by the police.

In 1899, the Central Committee of the Jewish Labour Bund tried to resume publication of the newspaper. Vladimir Lenin wrote, from his exile in Siberia, three articles for the unpublished third issue: Our Programme, Our Immediate Task and An Urgent Question.

== See also ==
- Rabochaya Gazeta (1922)
