= You Lie =

You Lie may refer to:

- "You Lie" (Cee Cee Chapman song), from the album Twist of Fate; also recorded by Reba McEntire from the album Rumor Has It
- "You Lie" (The Band Perry song), from the album The Band Perry
- "You lie!", an outburst by U.S. politician Joe Wilson
