= Dmitry Shcherbinovsky =

Russian painter (1867–1926)

Dmitry Anfimovich Shcherbinovsky Дмитрий Анфимович Щербиновский
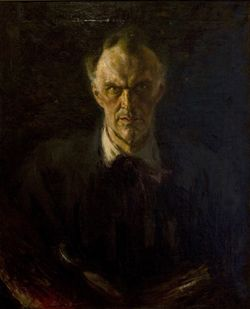
- Self-portrait (after 1917)
- Born: January 13, 1867; Petrovsk, Saratov Oblast, Russian Empire
- Died: November 27, 1926 (aged 59); Moscow, Soviet Union
- Style: Impressionism

Dmitry Anfimovich Shcherbinovsky (Russian: Дмитрий Анфимович Щербиновский; 13 January 1867 – 27 November 1926) was a Russian Impressionist painter and art teacher; associated with the Peredvizhniki.

== Biography ==
He was born in Petrovsk to a family of merchants. His first art lessons were at the "реальном училище" (Realschule) in Saratov. In 1885, at the insistence of his parents, he entered the law school at Moscow State University and graduated in 1891. While there, however, he had also taken lessons from Vasily Polenov, who encouraged him to become an artist.

He went almost directly from the University to the Imperial Academy of Arts, where he studied with Pavel Chistyakov and Ilya Repin, becoming one of the latter's favorite students. In 1896, his painting of lawyers during recess earned him the title of "Artist" and a stipend for further study abroad. As a result, he went to Paris, where he enrolled at the Académie Julian and worked with Tony Robert-Fleury.

After travelling throughout Northern Europe, he returned in 1900, settled in Saint Petersburg and taught at the studio operated by Princess Maria Tenisheva. Four years later, he moved to the Stroganov Moscow State University of Arts and Industry. He also gave private lessons. In recognition of his pedagogical efforts, he was awarded the Order of St. Anna. In 1914, he became a member of the Peredvizhniki, participating in their 42nd, 44th, 45th and 46th exhibitions. Boris Grigoriev was his best-known student at the State University.

After the Revolution, in addition to his usual employment, Shcherbinovsky taught at several handicraft schools and workers' associations and was a member of the "Council of Trade Union Painters" (SOZHIV). He died in 1926 in Moscow.

== Selected paintings ==
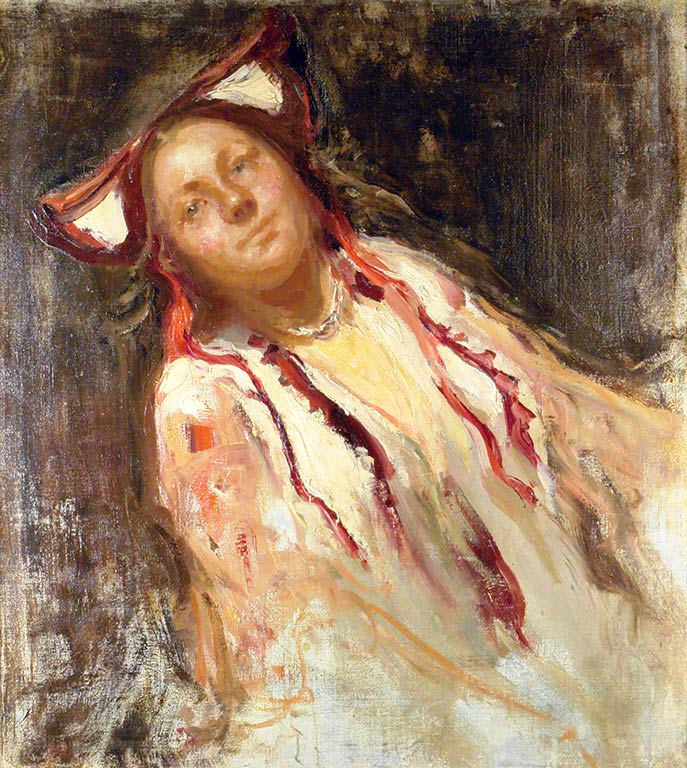
Peasant Girl

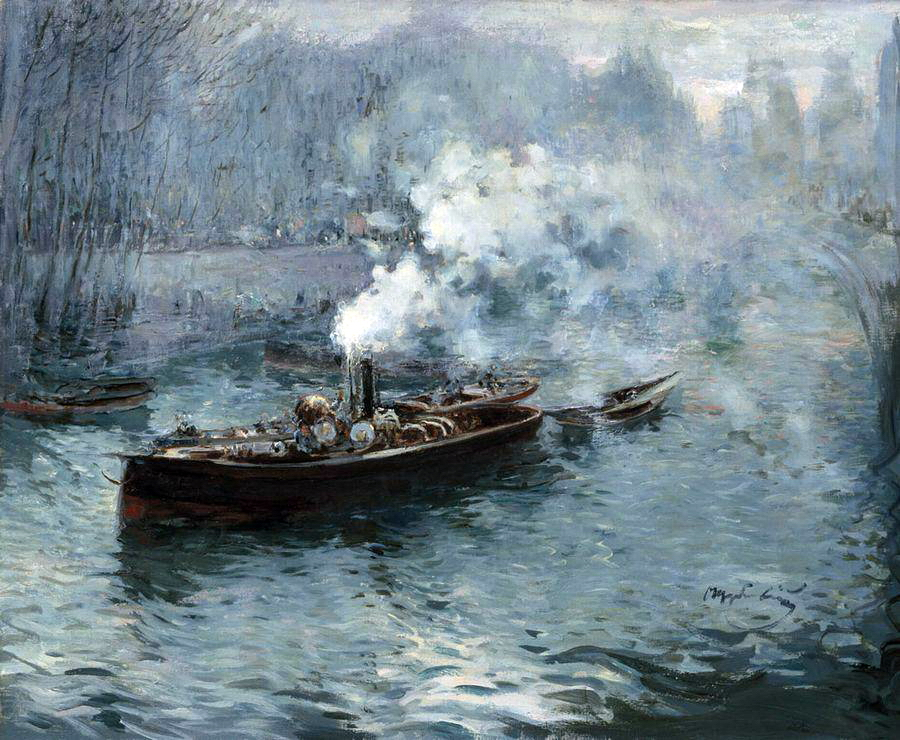
Steamship

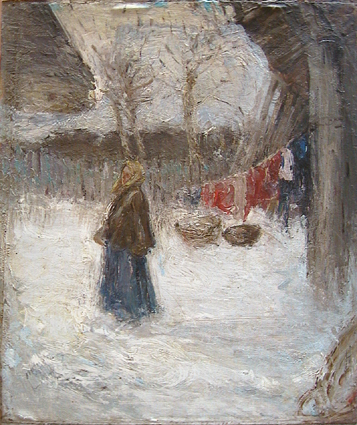
Linen and Laundress

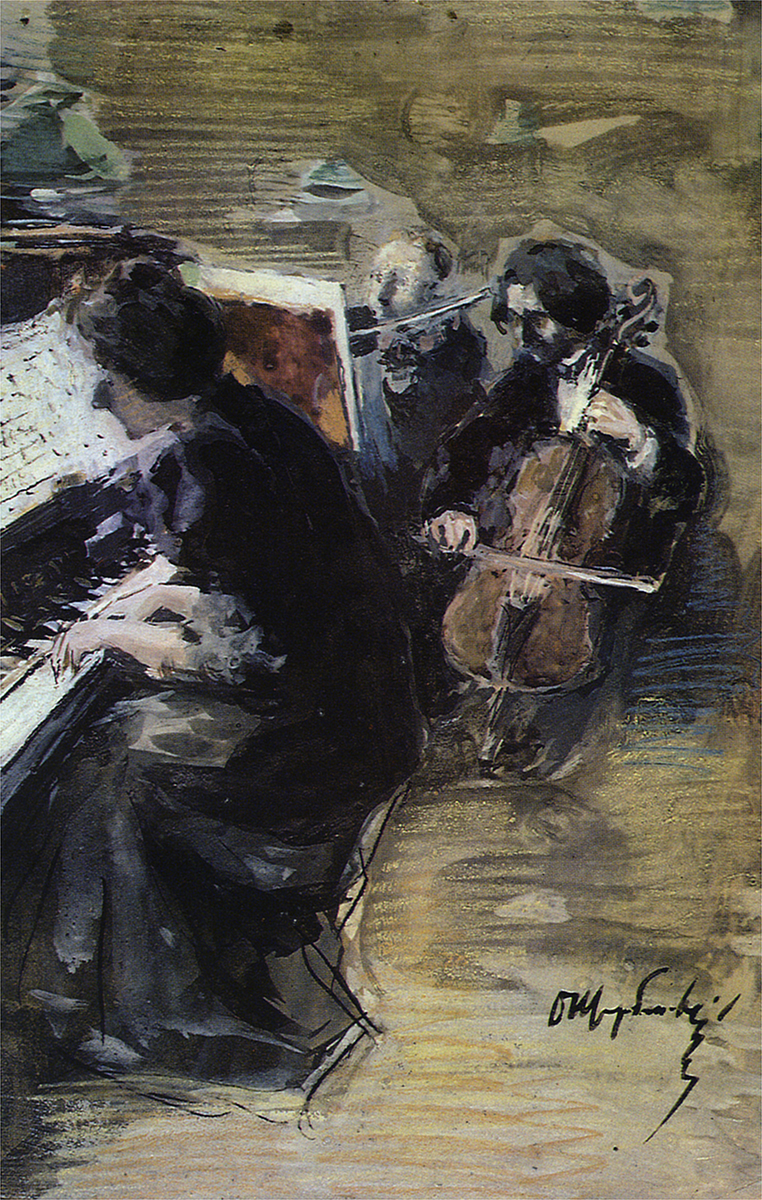
Trio
