= Yuliy Ganf =

Soviet graphic artist (1898–1973)

- Born: 8 June 1898 Poltava, Russian Empire
- Died: 21 May 1973 (aged 74) Moscow, Soviet Union
- Area: Cartoonist
- Awards: Fighter for Peace, 1970

Yuliy Abramovich Ganf (Russian: Юлий Абрамович Ганф; 9 June 1898 – 21 May 1973) was a Soviet graphic artist known for his satirical cartoons in the Krokodil magazine. He was furthermore active as a caricaturist, illustrator and poster designer.

== Life and career ==
Yuliy Ganf was born in the city of Poltava (present-day Ukraine). He studied in the Art Shop of Eduard Steinberg in 1917–1920 and in VKhUTEMAS (The Higher Artistic and Technical Shops) in 1922–1924. In 1920s, he produced political caricatures for Moscow-based magazines and newspapers: Krasny Perets, Bezbozhnik, Krokodil, Pravda, illustrated books published for Detgiz (The State Publishing House of Children's Literature of the Ministry of Education of RSFSR). He was the author of many political slogans in 1930s.

In 1945, he was granted the title of Honoured Worker of the Arts Industry of the RSFSR, and in 1964 was named a People's Artist of the RSFSR. In 1970, he was awarded the golden Fighter for Peace medal at the International Exhibition "Satire in Fight for Peace". Yuliy Ganf died in Moscow.

The artworks of Ganf are exhibited in several museums of art throughout Russia and CIS: Tver Museum of Art, Yekaterinburg Museum of Art, Lugansk Museum of Art, Yerevan Armenia Art Gallery, the Russian State Library and other collections.

== Awards and honours ==
- People's Artist of the RSFSR (visual arts) (1964)
- Honoured Worker of the Arts Industry of the RSFSR
- Medal "For Labour Valour"
