= Feliks Kon =

Polish activist

- Феликс Кон
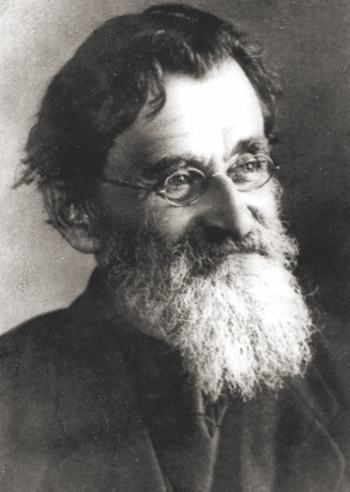
- Kon in 1925

First Secretary of the Communist Party (Bolsheviks) of Ukraine temporarily
- In office 22 March 1921 – 14 December 1921
- Preceded by: Vyacheslav Molotov
- Succeeded by: Dmitriy Manuilsky

Personal details
- Born: Feliks Yakovlevich Kon; 18 May 1864 Warsaw, Congress Poland
- Died: 28 July 1941 (aged 77) Khimki, Soviet Union
- Party: All-Union Communist Party (Bolsheviks)
- Other political affiliations: Polish Socialist Party (1906–1920)
- Relatives: Helena Heryng (sister)
- Education: University of Warsaw
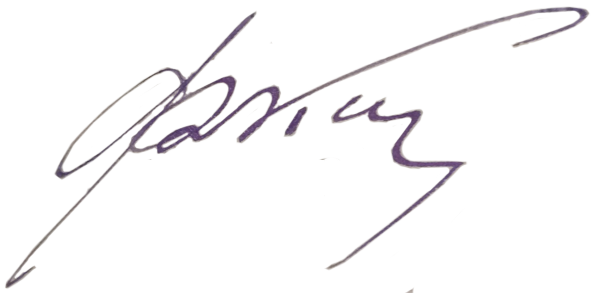
- Signature

Feliks Yakovlevich Kon (18 May 1864 – 30 July 1941) was a Polish communist activist, politician, ethnographer, publicist and journalist. He was the editor-in-chief of the Soviet satirical magazine, Krokodil.

== Life and career ==
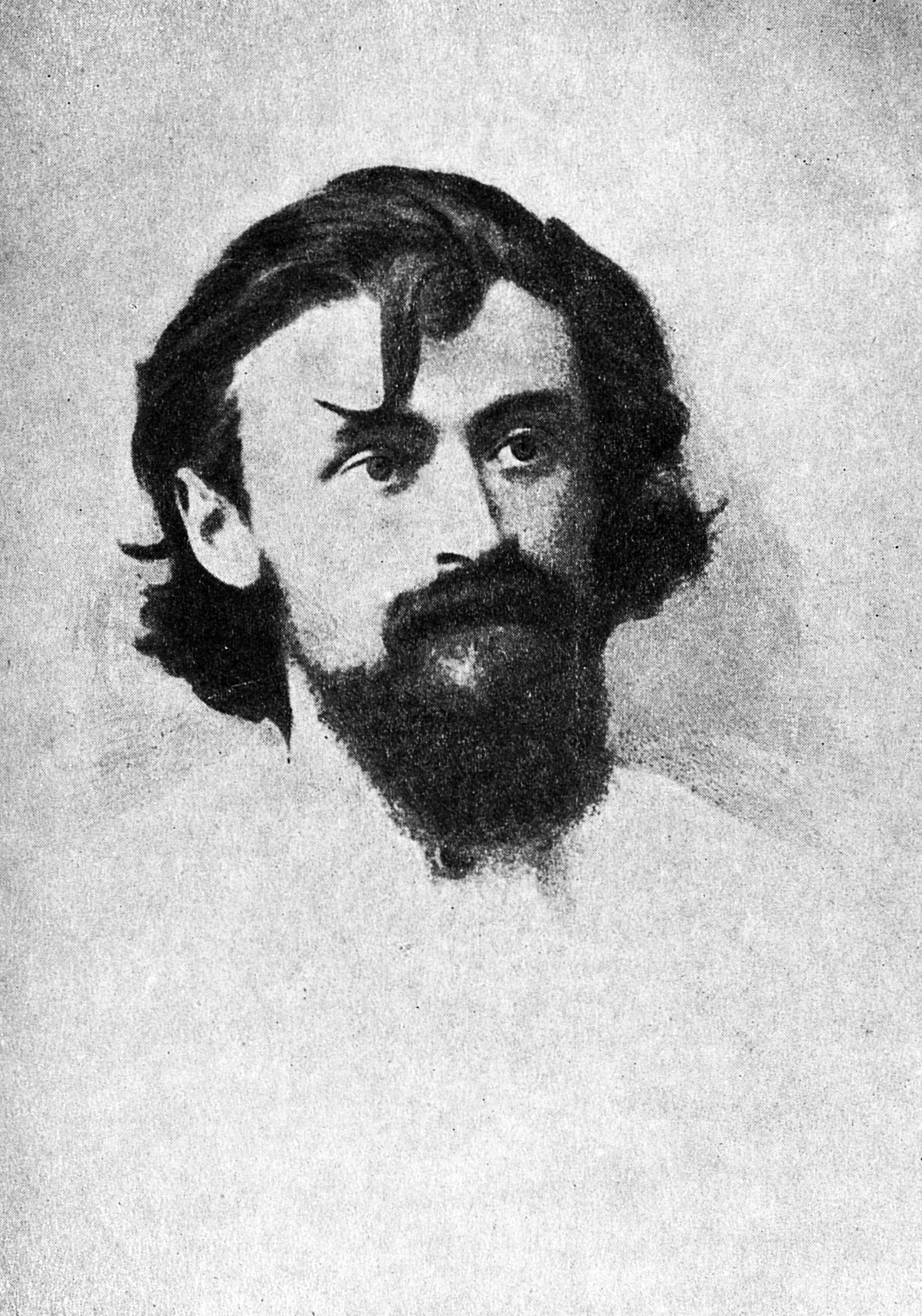
Feliks Kon in 1891

Born in Warsaw, Kon was the son of Yakov (Jakub) Kon and a Georgian Jewish woman who was brought up in Russia. His parents were both patriotic revolutionaries and took part in the Polish national movements such as the January Uprising. He was trained as a historian and a journalist, but was involved in politics. He had limited knowledge of Polish affairs at first, but intuitively felt the revolutionary element among Polish workers that he could mobilize.

He was a member of the anti-Piłsudski faction of the Polish Socialist Party and gravitated towards the anti-independence & pro-communism point of view. In January 1897 the Tsarist government at last taken took an administrative decision to banish him. He was exiled to Irkutsk and began working on the progressive newspaper "Vostochnoye Obozrenie" (Eastern Review).

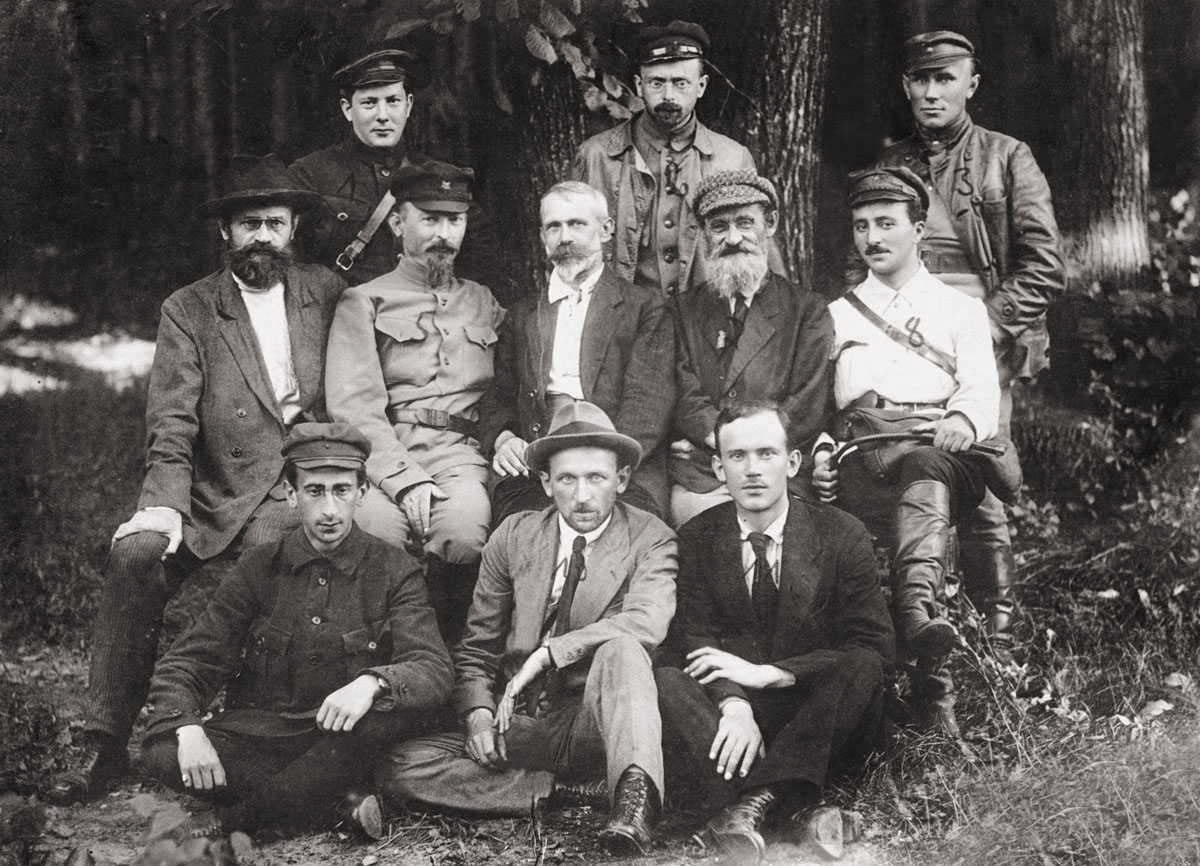
Polrewkom 1920 (in center left to right: Ivan Skvortsov-Stepanov, Felix Dzerzhinsky, Julian Marchlewski, Feliks Kon)

As the Bolsheviks began to prepare for the Polish-Soviet War, they summoned an increasing number of Polish communists, active elsewhere in Soviet service, to Moscow in order to form a cadre of party and state officials to move into ethnographic Poland with the Red Army. He was put on the Provisional Polish Revolutionary Committee (formed in Białystok on 30 July 1920 – dissolved 20 August 1920) during the Polish-Soviet War.

During this period he was editor-in-chief of the Goniec Czerwony newspaper, the official organ of the temporary revolutionary committee. The first issue appeared on 7 August. Its purpose was to agitate and it printed all the appeals issued by the Communist puppet government, as well as distinctly skewed news from the war. Twelve issues appeared, the last on 20 August as the Polish army approached the city. In the last issue he triumphantly proclaimed in an article entitled "Dwa światy" (Two Worlds): The old world disappears, but a new one is born: great, powerful and a genuinely independent Polish Socialist Republic will hold the prominent post in this world.

In the 1930s, he held various positions in the Soviet and party apparatus. in 1930–1931 he was head of the arts sector of the People's Commissariat of Education and from 1931 to 1933 he served as the first chairman of the All-Union Committee on Radio Broadcasting at the People's Commissariat of Posts and Telegraphs of the USSR and 1933 head of the museum department of the People's Commissariat for Education of the RSFSR. He was also among the founders of the International Red Aid.

After the war, he decided to remain in the Soviet Union, where he was an activist in the Communist Party (Bolshevik) of Ukraine and the Comintern. However, letters written by Vladimir Lenin referred to Kon, whom he "couldn't stand", as simply an "old fool" (staryi duren).

Kon also served as an editor at several newspapers including Krasnaya Zvezda. In 1941, he became the director of the Polish-directed propaganda section at Radio Moscow. The first broadcasts in Polish were on 22 June 1941. However, he died a natural death shortly afterwards at age 77, at Moscow's Khimki water station during the evacuation of the city before the advancing German army and the Battle of Moscow. Many of the other prominent members of the Polish Socialist Party-Left were later liquidated by the NKVD. Many had also been liquidated earlier, in particular during the Great Purge.

== Arts ==
During his exile for revolutionary activity turned to ethnographic research although he had no preparation for it. He also recorded literature possessions in Siberia.

During the late 1920s and 1930s, he was the head of the museum department in the People's Commissariat for Education. As an "old Bolshevik" he managed to secure many pictures for the Kyrgyz Gallery.

In 1936, he published his memoirs (in Russian) entitled Za Pietdziesiat Let (also translated into Polish in 1969: Narodziny wieku – wspomnienia published by Książka i Wiedza).

== Ship ==
A Russian sea vessel named in his honor, the Feliks Kon, sank in 1996 in the Sea of Okhotsk, releasing 1000 tons of fuel oil.
