= Russian Social Democratic Labour Party (Mensheviks) =

Historic political party in Russia founded in 1912

Russian Social Democratic Labour Party (Mensheviks) Российская социал-демократическая рабочая партия (меньшевиков)
- General Secretary: Various
- Founded: 1912; 114 years ago
- Dissolved: 1965; 61 years ago
- Preceded by: Russian Social Democratic Labour Party
- Headquarters: Saint Petersburg (1912–20); Berlin (1920–33); Paris (1933–40); New York City (1940–65)
- Newspaper: Socialist Courier; Рабочая газета (Workers' Gazette)
- Ideology: Democratic socialism Social democracy Marxism
- Political position: Left-wing
- International affiliation: Vienna International (1921–23); Labour and Socialist International (1923–40)
- Colours: Red

The Russian Social Democratic Labour Party (Mensheviks), (Note: Russian: Российская социал-демократическая рабочая партия (меньшевиков), romanized: Rossiyskaya sotsial-demokraticheskaya rabochaya partiya (men'shevikov), IPA: [rɐˈsʲijskəjə sətsɨˌal‿dʲɪməkrɐˈtʲitɕɪskəjə rɐˈbotɕɪjə ˈpartʲɪjə (mʲɪnʲʂɨvʲɪˈkof)]) RSLDP (m), and later renamed the Russian Social Democratic Labour Party (United), (Note: Russian: Российская социал-демократическая рабочая партия (объединённая), romanized: Rossiyskaya sotsial-demokraticheskaya rabochaya partiya (ob’yedinyonnaya), IPA: [rɐˈsʲijskəjə sətsɨˌal‿dʲɪməkrɐˈtʲitɕɪskəjə rɐˈbotɕɪjə ˈpartʲɪjə (ɐbjɪdʲɪˈnʲɵnːəjə)]) was a political party in Russia.

It emerged in 1912 as the Russian Social Democratic Labour Party was divided into two, the other group being the Russian Social Democratic Labour Party (Bolsheviks).

However, the Mensheviks and Bolsheviks had existed as factions of the original party since 1903.

== History ==
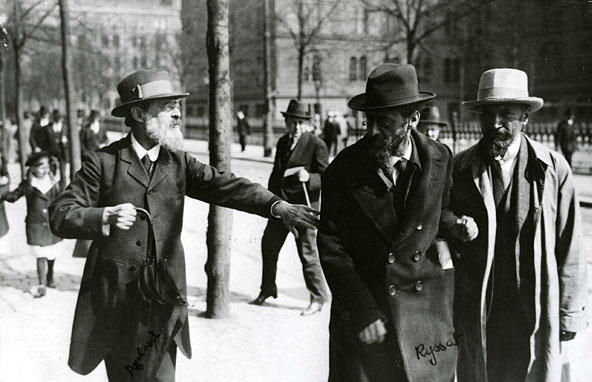
Leaders of the Menshevik Party at Norra Bantorget in Stockholm, Sweden, May 1917 (Pavel Axelrod, Julius Martov and Alexander Martinov)

After the 1912 split, the General Jewish Labour Bund in Lithuania, Poland and Russia became a federated part of the Russian Social Democratic Labour Party (Menshevik) as by this time the Mensheviks had accepted the idea of a federated party organization.

On August 19–26, 1917 a 'unification congress' was organized by the party in Petrograd seeking to unite different social democratic factions, at which Menshevik Defencists (Plekhanovites and Potresovites), Menshevik Internationalists (followers of Martov) and Novaya Zhizn group took part. 220 delegates, representing 193,172 party members, took part in the proceedings. At the 1917 congress, a party Central Committee consisting of Raphael Abramovich, I. Akhmatov, I. Astrov, Pavel Axelrod, B. Gurevich, E. Broido, F. Lipkin, Fyodor Dan, Henryk Ehrlich, V. Ezhov, K. G. Gogua, B. Gorev, Ivan Maisky, Julius Martov, Alexander Martinov, A. Frumson, Pinkevich, S. Semkovsky and I. Volkov was elected. The name of the party was changed to 'RSDLP (United)'.

After the October Revolution, differences emerged inside the party. In 1921, the party issued the "Platform of the Russian Social Democratic Labour Party", calling for liquidating the political monopoly of the Communist Party, which was identified as something quite different from the dictatorship of the proletariat, privatizations of large sectors of industry and giving full voting rights to the peasantry and those treated by the Soviet government as the bourgeois class. From the beginning of 1921 after the suppression of the Kronstadt garrison revolt, the 10th Communist Party Congress and the introduction of the New Economic Policy (NEP) and ending of forcible confiscation of grain from the peasantry, the Russian Social Democratic Labour Party was forced to operate underground in Soviet Russia and openly only in exile in Europe and North America. The Foreign Delegation of the party had been established in 1920 and was at first located in Berlin (until 1933), then shifted to Paris and in 1940 moved to New York City. In exile, the party consisted of small groups in Geneva, Liège, Berlin, Paris, Bern and New York City. Martov and Abramovich chaired the Foreign Delegation until 1923, when it was chaired by Fyodor Dan and Abramovich. Aron Jugov was the secretary of the Foreign Delegation.

In 1921, the party formed part of the Vienna International, with Martov and Abramovich being two of the organizers. At the founding Congress of the Labour and Socialist International (LSI) in 1923, eleven Menshevik delegates participated. The party was a member of the LSI from 1923–1940. Abramovich represented the party in the LSI executive during this entire period, being a member of the LSI bureau until May 1939. The party published Socialist Courier from 1921 to 1965 (from 1 February 1921 to 1933 in Berlin, then in Paris until 1940 and in New York from then until 1965).
