= Neutral Group of Social Democrats in Berlin =

The Neutral Group of Social-Democrats in Berlin was a group of exiled Russian Social Democrats in Berlin, formed round V. A. Bazarov in the autumn of 1900 and set itself the task of healing the split between the supporters of Rabocheye Delo and the Emancipation of Labour group after the Second Congress of the Union of Russian Social-Democrats Abroad. Among its members were also M. G. Vecheslov and I. B. Basovsky. According to Bazarov, the group sent its representatives to Geneva in early 1900 to persuade the Iskra and the Sotsial-Demokrat organisation to be reconciled with the Union. The group issued three or four political proclamations and was disbanded in the summer of 1901.
