= Vladimir Makhnovets =

Leader of the Russian Social-Democrats (1872–1921)

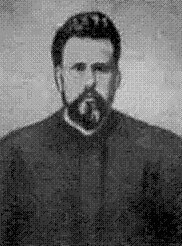

Vladimir Petrovich Makhnovets (Russian: Владимир Петрович Махновец; 7 September 1872 – 15 November 1921), also known as Akimovhe, was a leader of the Russian Social-Democrats.

He was born in 1872 in Vorornezh and studied in Saint Petersburg.

In 1890, Akimov participated in revolutionary groups: first with the Narodnik, then the League of Struggle for the Emancipation of the Working Class. He was arrested and deported to Siberia in April 1898. In September 1898, he escaped and fled to Geneva. There he joined the Union of Russian Social Democrats Abroad and became one of the editors of its magazine Rabocheye Delo. Akimov then formed a faction opposed to the group that would soon establish the Iskra newspaper, with Georgi Plekhanov and Vladimir Lenin.

Along with Aleksandr Martynov, he represented the Economist trend at the Second Congress (1903). His faction was defeated at the congress by the majority of the Iskra. However, as the majority split between Bolsheviks and Mensheviks, his faction joined forces with the Mensheviks of Martov. In 1905 he published a polemical history of the RSDLP. In the following years he aligned with the right wing of the Mensheviks.

He returned illegally to England in 1905 during the revolution and joined the Cordwainer trade union, which enabled him to participate in the Saint Petersburg Soviet.

At the fourth Congress of the party (1906), Akimov spoke against an armed uprising and, in general, opposed insurrection as a means of achieving socialism. Instead, he stated that the social-democrats should support the liberals (Cadets) in the elections for the State Duma. He maintained this position in the 1912 elections and was criticized by other militants, like Lenin.

In 1911, he was jailed for his text "Cutting Heads", which was published in 1908. However, he was successful in escaping exile. He returned to Russia after the 1913 amnesty.

He died in Zenigorod (Moscow oblast) in November 1921.

The two major works of Akimov have not been republished since 1969.

== Works ==
- Vladimir Akimov on the Dilemmas of Russian Marxism 1895-1903, Cambridge University Press, 19420.

== Sources ==
- Akimov on the MIA glossary
- Vladimir Makhnovets notice on France archives
