= Makhnovets =

Makhnovets is a surname. Notable people with the surname include:

- Leonid Makhnovets (1919–1993), Ukrainian literary critic, historian, archaeologist, interpreter, and bibliographer
- Vladimir Makhnovets (1872–1921), Russian politician
