= Vladimir Akimov =

Vladimir Akimov may refer to:

- Vladimir Petrovich Akimov (1872–1921), Russian social-democrat leader
- Vladimir Ivanovich Akimov (1953–1987), Soviet water polo player
