= Anatoly Vaneyev =

Russian revolutionary and politician

Anatoly Aleksandrovich Vaneyev
- Анатолий Александрович Ванеев
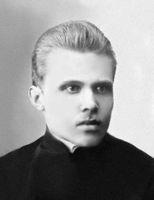
- Born: 9 March 1872; Nizhny Novrorod, Nizhny Novgorod Governorate, Russian Empire
- Died: 20 September 1899 (aged 27); Yermakovskoye, Krasnoyarsk Krai
- Occupation: Politician

Anatoly Aleksandrovich Vaneyev (Russian: Анато́лий Алекса́ндрович Ване́ев; 9 March [O.S. 26 February] 1872 – 20 September [O.S. 8 September] 1899) was an active participant of the revolutionary movement in the Russian Empire.

== Biography ==
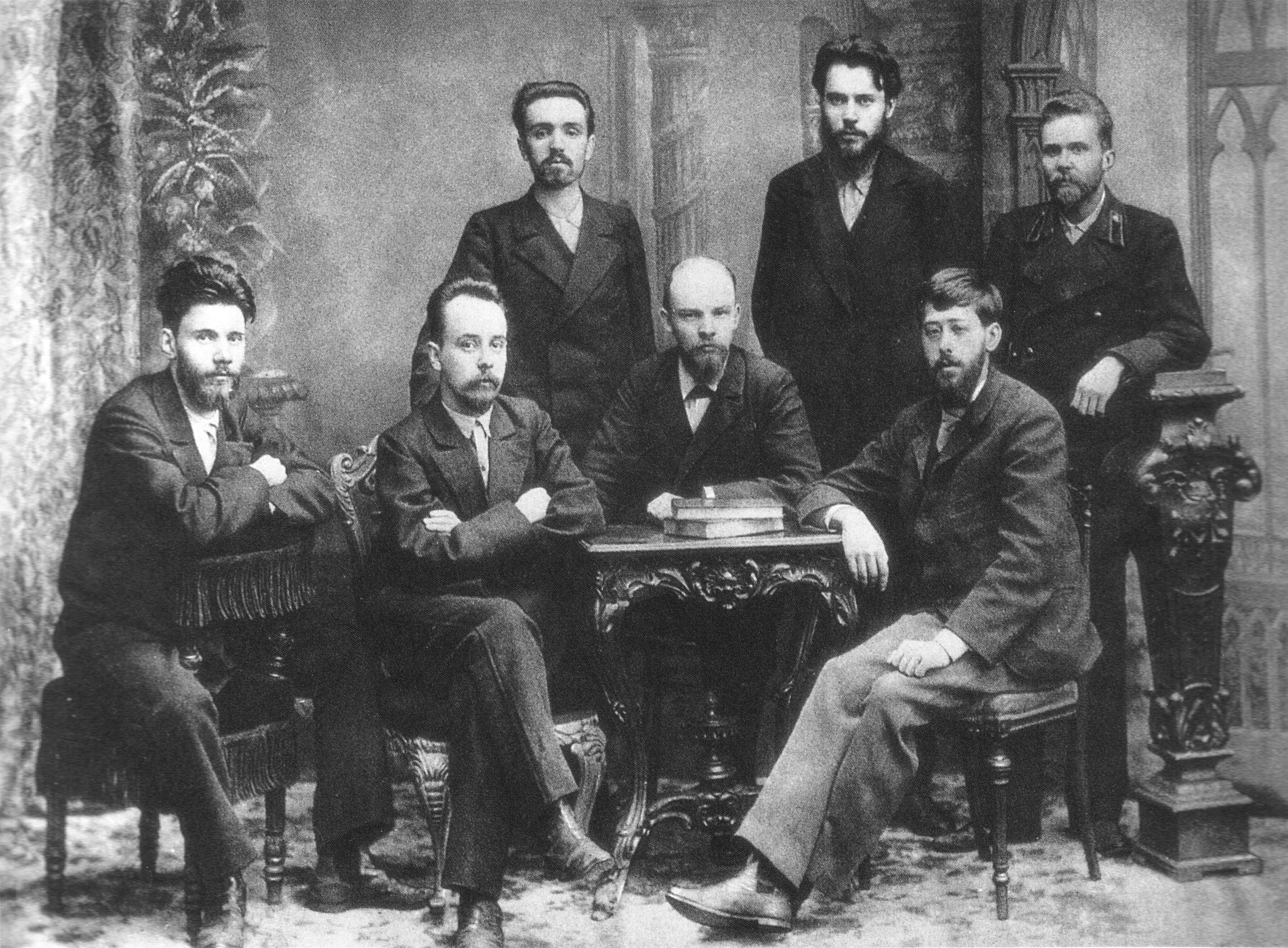
Members of the League. Standing (left to right): A. L. Malchenko, P. K. Zaporozhets, A. A. Vaneyev; Sitting (left to right): V. V. Starkov, G. M. Krzhizhanovsky, Lenin, Julius Martov. St. Petersburg, 1897.

Anatoly Vaneyev was born in the family of an official. He went to the Saint Petersburg State Institute of Technology. Being a student he participated, under the leadership of Vladimir Lenin, in the creation of the St. Petersburg League of Struggle for the Emancipation of the Working Class and its activities. He supervised the technical preparation of the publication of the newspaper Rabocheye Delo. He also took part in the hectography of Lenin's 1894 work What the "Friends of the People" Are and How They Fight the Social-Democrats.

In December 1895 he was arrested and, in 1897, banished to Eastern Siberia. In exile, he married Dominika Trukhovskaya. In the late summer of 1899 he signed A Protest by Russian Social-Democrats, directed against the so-called "economists".

He died shortly after, in September, from tuberculosis, which he contracted during solitary confinement in prison, prior to his banishment.

The son of Anatoly and Dominika was born three weeks after his death and was named Anatoly, like his father.

== Memorials ==
- In honor of Anatoly Vaneyev, several streets were named after him in cities and towns of the former Soviet Union.
- In Yermakovskoye, a memorial house-museum was opened where he lived in exile.
- Also in Yermakovskoye, a sovkhoz (state farm) was named after him.

== Bibliography ==
- Ванеев Анатолий Александрович (Anatoly Aleksandrovich Vaneyev) in the Great Soviet Encyclopedia (in Russian) – via Great Scientific Library
