= Raphael Abramovitch =

Russian Bundist and Socialist politician

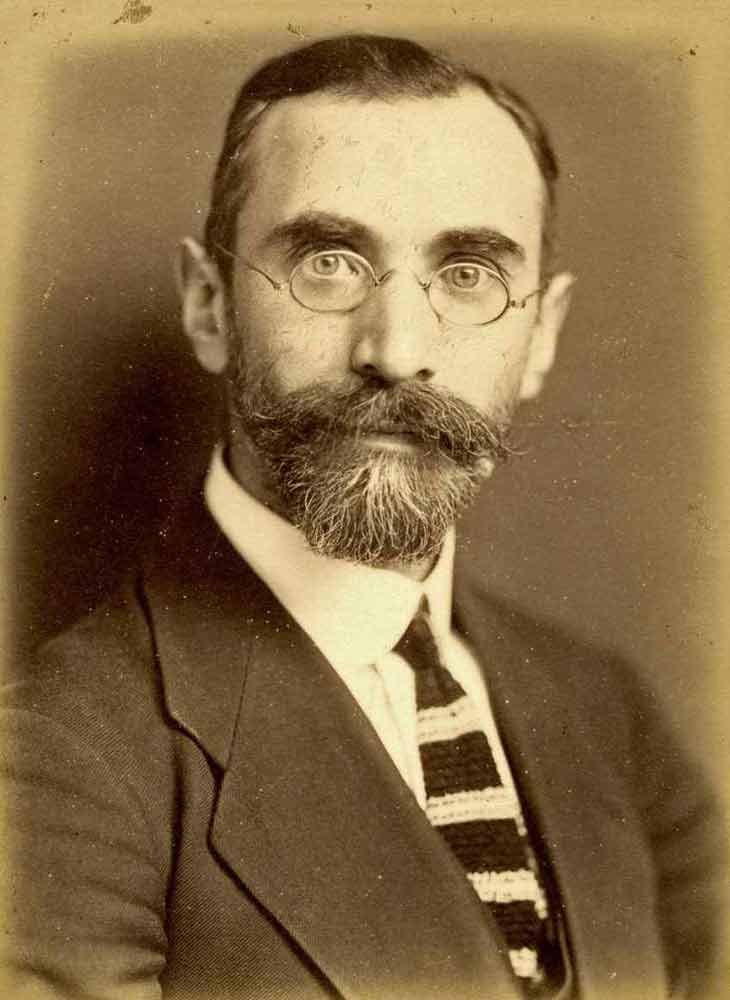
Abramovitch c. 1922

Raphael Abramovitch Rein (Russian: Рафаил Абрамович Рейн; 21 July 1880 – 11 April 1963) was a Russian socialist, a member of the General Jewish Workers' Union in Lithuania, Poland and Russia (Bund), and a leader of the Menshevik wing of the Russian Social-Democratic Workers' Party (RSDRP).

Abramovitch emigrated from Soviet Russia in 1920, landing in Berlin, where he was a co-founder of the long-running Menshevik journal The Socialist Courier. After 1940, with the rise of fascism in Europe, he made his way to the United States, where he lived his final years.

== Biography ==
=== Early years ===
Raphael Abramovitch Rein was born in Dvinsk, the capital of the Vitebsk Governorate of the Russian Empire (today Daugavpils, Latvia), on 7 July 1880. As a student at Riga Polytechnical Institute he became involved in revolutionary politics and became a convinced Marxist.

=== Revolutionary activity ===
In 1901 he joined the Bund and the Russian Social Democratic Labour Party (RSDRP). After being arrested, he emigrated, and worked with the Bund abroad. When the Bund withdrew from the RSDRP in 1903, Abramovitch maintained contact with Menshevik leaders Martov and Fyodor Dan. The Bund and the Mensheviks eventually patched up their differences, and Abramovitch became a member of the Menshevik party. He edited the Social-Democratic journals Evreiskii Rabochii (Jewish Workers) and Nashe Slovo (Our Word). In 1904 Abramovitch became a member of the Central Committee of the Bund. During the abortive Revolution of 1905, he represented the Bund in the St. Petersburg Soviet. In 1907 he ran unsuccessfully as a candidate for the second Duma. He attended the conferences of the Bund and the RSDRP in 1906 and 1907. In 1911 he was arrested and exiled to Vologda but fled abroad. In 1912–14, he lived in Vienna, working as a correspondent for the Bund newspapers, Leben Frage and Tseit. published legally in Warsaw and St Petersburg.

In 1914 he at first sided with the Internationalist wing of the Menshevik party, which opposed the First World War, but he was not as radically anti-war as Martov. After the February Revolution of 1917, Abramovitch returned to Russia. He became a member of the Central Committee of the Petrograd Soviet. For a while he became a qualified Revolutionary Defencist, siding with Mensheviks like Dan and Tsereteli against Martov. While Martov's Menshevik Internationalists opposed the war altogether, the Revolutionary Defencists supported a limited war effort in defence of the Revolution. However, they opposed territorial or financial war aims and rejected the unqualified pro-war stance of 'Social Patriots' like the aged Plekhanov and A.N. Potresov.

=== Russian revolution ===
After the October Revolution, Abramovitch and Dan once more moved to the left and rejoined Martov's faction. Abramovitch played a role in unsuccessful attempts to negotiate an all-socialist coalition with the Bolsheviks, comprising Bolsheviks, Mensheviks, Socialist-Revolutionaries of various factions and Popular Socialists. Neither Lenin nor most of the leaders of the other proposed coalition partners had any interest in this idea, though there was popular support for it among workers. The negotiations failed. Abramovitch subsequently became more critical of the Bolsheviks. In 1918 he was arrested for anti-Soviet activities and escaped execution due to the intervention of Friedrich Adler and other foreign socialists. At the 12th Bund Congress, he fiercely opposed a proposal by some of those present to amalgamate with the Communist party,

=== Exile ===
In 1920 Abramovitch left Soviet Russia. He settled in Berlin, where he co-founded and co-edited the Menshevik paper Sotsialisticheskii Vestnik (Socialist Courier). In the 1920s he was involved in organising the Vienna-based International Working Union of Socialist Parties, which united non-communist socialist parties that rejected the 'Social Patriot' leadership of the old Second International but refused to join the Communist Third International. He was later included in the executive of the Labour and Socialist International. Abramovitch was also instrumental in maintaining contact between Mensheviks abroad and their comrades in Russia. He helped mobilise Western socialist and labour support for socialists persecuted by the Soviet government, e.g. during the Trial of the Socialist Revolutionaries in 1922 and the Menshevik Trial in 1931.

After the rise of Hitler, Abramovitch moved to Paris. In 1940, when the Germans invaded France, he fled to the United States. He mainly lived in New York. He was a contributor to the Yiddish Social-Democratic paper Forwerts (Forward). Abramovitch wrote his memoirs in Yiddish and an English-language history of the Russian Revolution. He remained heavily involved in the activities of the Menshevik party in exile. In later years he opposed Fyodor Dan's position that Soviet Russia, for all its flaws, was the country 'building socialism' and must be supported, and denounced Soviet totalitarianism. In 1949 he was one of the founders of the Union for the Liberation of the Peoples of Russia.

=== Death and legacy ===
Raphael Abramovitch was the father of the journalist Mark Rein, who disappeared in Spain on 9–10 April, 1937. Rein is thought to have been murdered by unknown assailants.

== Works ==
- Der Terror gegen die sozialistischen Parteien in Russland und Georgien. With I. Tsereteli and V. Suchomlin. Berlin, 1925.
- Wandlungen der bolschewistischen Diktatur. Berlin, 1931.
- The Soviet Revolution, 1917-1939. New York: International Universities Press, 1962.
