= Listok Rabotnika =

Listok Rabotnika (Russian: Листок Работника, Russian pronunciation: [lʲɪˈstok rɐˈbotʲnʲɪkə], The Worker's Paper) was a non-periodical newspaper of the Russian Empire, published from 1896 to 1898 in Geneva. It was an organ of the Union of Russian Social Democrats Abroad.

The newspaper published ten issues, the first eight under the direction of Emancipation of Labour group. Because the majority of the Union shifted towards the Economists, the last two numbers were not published under the direction of Emancipation of Labour, but under the Economists instead.
