= Sankt-Peterburgskiy Rabochiy Listok =

Sankt-Peterburgskiy Rabochiy Listok (Russian: Санкт-Петербургский Рабочий Листок, Saint Petersburg Workers' Paper) was an illegal newspaper of the Russian Empire, published in 1897. It was an organ of the League of Struggle for the Emancipation of the Working Class.

The newspaper published two issues, the first on February (300—400 copies were made) in Russia and the second on September, in Geneva.
