= St. Petersburg Workers' Organisation =

St. Petersburg Workers' Organisation was a socialist group, oriented towards economism, in St. Petersburg, Russian Empire. It was set up in the summer of 1900. Its appeal 'To the Workers of All Factories', published in its newspaper Rabochaya Mysl (Russian: Рабочая Mысль, Workers' Thought) No. 9, September 1900, called on the workers to organise circles for the working out of a programme of struggle and for mutual assistance. In the autumn of 1900, the Workers' Organisation merged with the St. Petersburg League of Struggle for the Emancipation of the Working Class. The programme and charter of this united organisation were carried in Rabochaya Mysl No. 11 in April 1901.
