= Mark Rein (journalist) =

- Rein c. 1930
- Born: 1909; Vilnius, Lithuania
- Disappeared: April 9–10, 1937 (aged 27); Barcelona, Spain
- Education: Technische Hochschule (now Technische Universität Berlin)
- Occupations: Journalist, radio operator
- Parent: Raphael Abramovitch Rein

Mark Rafailovich Rein (1909–1937?) was a socialist journalist and member of Neu Beginnen who disappeared in Barcelona during the Spanish Civil War. His father was the Menshevik leader Raphael Abramovitch Rein. His disappearance remains a mystery.

== Early life ==
Mark Rafailovich Rein was born in 1909 in Vilna, Russian Empire (now Vilnius, Lithuania). His father was Raphael Abramovitch Rein, a Menshevik Russian and a prominent leader of the Russian Social-Democratic Workers' Party (RSDRP). Despite playing an active role in the 1917 Russian Revolution, Abramovich became a determined organiser of anti-Bolshevik activism, which led to his arrest in 1919. Rather than face further prosecution for his activities, he and his family, including a young Mark Rein, left the country in 1920.

== Career ==
After leaving Russia, Abramovich and his family lived mostly in Berlin and Paris. As a young man Rein became a member of his father's political movement, the Mensheviks, as well as the German Social Democratic Party, eventually ending up as a member of Neu Beginnen, a Berlin-based Marxist splinter group, in the summer of 1931. In 1932, he graduated from the Technische Hochschule in Charlottenburg (now Technische Universität Berlin), working as a journalist for several socialist papers there afterwards. His exact views, and how they differed from his father, remain a mystery. Rein's archive shows signs of being incomplete, suggesting his father excised certain materials before he donated them to the International Institute of Social History.

On 4 March 1937, at the height of the Spanish Civil War, Rein travelled to Spain, apparently at the invite of his friend Nikolai Sundelevich, a French-Russian engineer. His exact purpose in visiting the country remains unclear: his father stated that he "went there to work in a [Catalonian] munitions factory", but Rein informed border officials that he was a journalist. There is no evidence that Rein conducted any journalistic or factory work in Spain. Indeed, he never submitted articles to the Spanish censor, nor did he publish any materials with any of the papers he supposedly held credentials for. Some sources have suggested that Rein was carrying out "special tasks" for his father in Spain before he disappeared.

== Disappearance ==
On April 9–10, 1937, Rein left his hotel room in Barcelona and was never seen or heard of again. In all likelihood, he was kidnapped by unknown assailants. Despite a lack of evidence, many different allied and opposing political factions have been accused of his murder, including the NKVD, the Spanish police, Communists, anarchists, arms dealers, various German expat groups (who opposed the activities of Neu Beginnen), as well as other minor left and right-wing organisations then active in Barcelona.

Many researchers have taken it as read that the NKVD was responsible for his disappearance, partially as a result of the efforts by many contemporary onlookers to publicise the influential but highly dubious report of Alfonso Laurencic, a political operative who had lived in Barcelona since 1933. Laurencic's "Report about the G.P.U." was commissioned by the British intelligence services, who believed the report's conclusions despite it not offering any new evidence, inventing salacious allegations and solely relying on a handful of biased fascist sources. Laurencic has been accused by many sources of acting as an agent-for-hire for the Nationalist faction (Spanish Civil War) as well as the Italian and German secret police.

Despite the best efforts of his father, contemporary activists and reporters, as well as many researchers in the years since, Rein's disappearance has remained a mystery.

== Sources ==
- Papers of Mark Rein. International Institute of Social History.
- Rafail Abramovich Papers. International Institute of Social History.
- 'The Case of Mark Rein.' Socialist Appeal Vol. I No. 11 Saturday October 23, 1937.
- Krivitsky, W.G., I Was Stalin's Agent. New York, 1940, p. 193 ff.
- Orlov, A.M., The Secret History of Stalin's Crimes. New York, 1953.
- Chase, William J.; Novikova-Monterde, Olga (2026). The Many Faces of Antifascism: Interwar Marxist Militant Networks and the Divided Response to Fascism. Oxford: Oxford University Press. doi:10.1093/9780198994428.001.0001. ISBN 9780198994428.
