= Socialist Courier =

Socialist Courier, or Socialist Herald (Социалистический вестник) was a newspaper established by Russian Social Democratic Labour Party (Mensheviks) that lasted from 1921 to 1965. It was successively published in Berlin, Paris, and New York City. The first editors included Julius Martov, Fyodor Dan, and Raphael Abramovitch. The newspaper initially featured correspondents who lived in the Soviet Union, mainly Mensheviks.
