= League of Struggle for the Emancipation of the Working Class =

Marxist political group in the Russian Empire

League of Struggle for the Emancipation of the Working Class Союз борьбы за освобождение рабочего класса
- Abbreviation: SBORK
- Leader: Vladimir Lenin
- Founded: November 1895; 130 years ago
- Dissolved: Autumn 1900; 126 years ago
- Merged into: RSDLP
- Headquarters: Saint Petersburg, Russia
- Newspaper: The Workers' Cause
- Ideology: Communism; Marxism; Revolutionary socialism
- Political position: Far-left
- Slogan: "Workers of the world, unite!" (Russian: «Пролетаріи всѣхъ странъ, соединяйтесь!»)

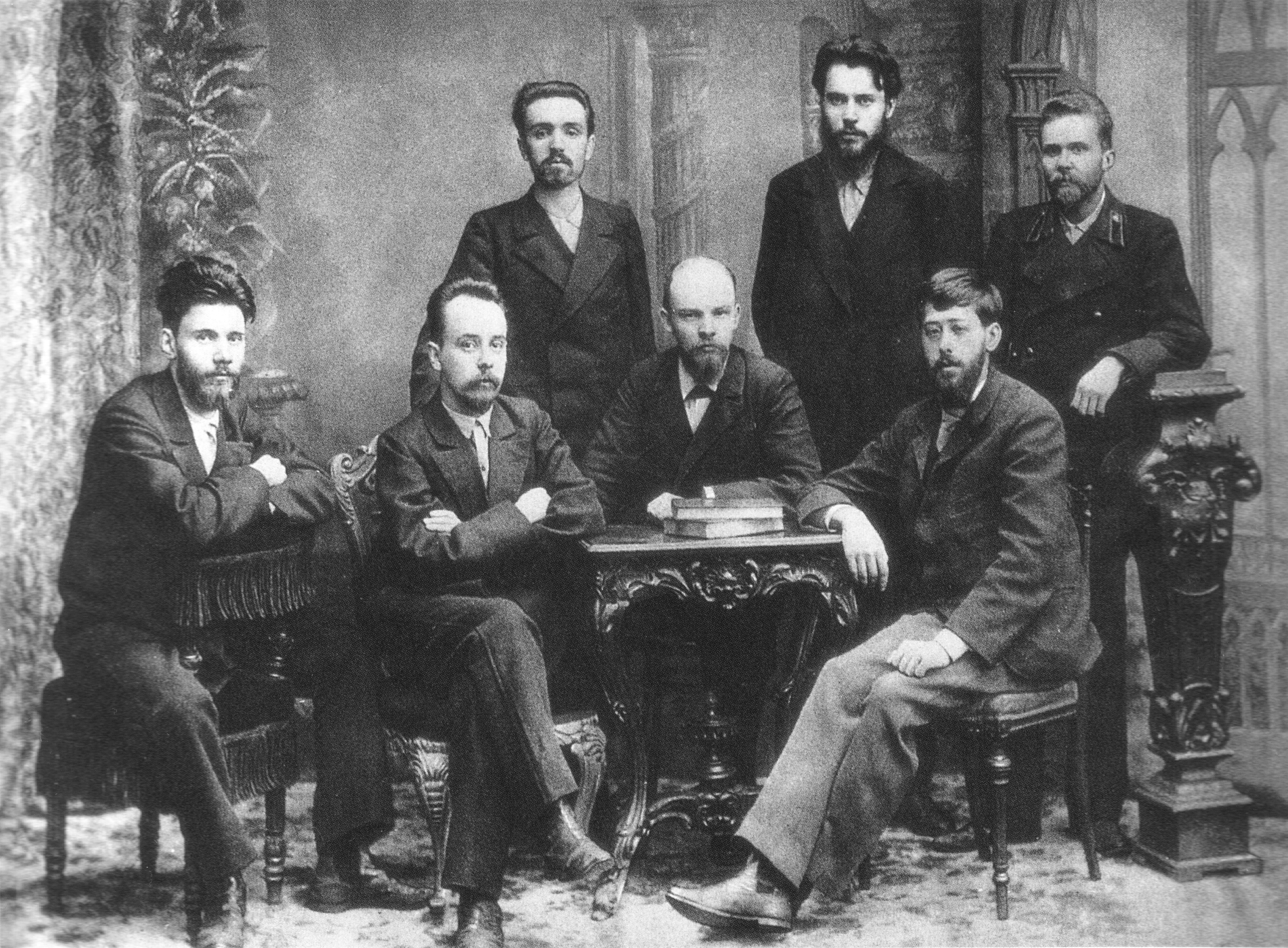
Members of the League. Standing (left to right): Alexander Malchenko, P. Zaporozhets, Anatoly Vaneyev; Sitting (left to right): Vasily Starkov, Gleb Krzhizhanovsky, Vladimir Lenin, Julius Martov; 1897.

An example of pseudohistory: after Alexander Malashenko fell out of favor with Stalin in 1930 due to his support of J. Martov, he was removed from the picture.

The League of Struggle for the Emancipation of the Working Class (LSEWC) (Note: Russian: Союз борьбы за освобождение рабочего класса (СБОРК), romanized: Soyuz bor'by za osvobozhdeniye rabochego klassa (SBORK), IPA: [sɐˈjuz‿bɐrʲˈbɨ zə‿ɐsvəbɐʐˈdʲenʲɪje rɐˈbotɕɪvə ˈklasə (ˈzbork)]) was a Marxist group in the Russian Empire. It was founded in St. Petersburg by Vladimir Lenin, Julius Martov, Gleb Krzhizhanovsky, Anatoly Vaneyev, Alexander Malchenko, Pyotr Zaporozhets and Vasily Starkov in the autumn of 1895. It united twenty different Marxist study circles, but Lenin dominated the league through the 'central group'. Its main activity was agitation amongst the workers of St. Petersburg and the distribution of socialist leaflets to the factories there.

Towards the end of 1895, the League had prepared the first issue of their new newspaper, Rabocheye Delo; it was ready to go to press when it was seized by the gendarmes during a raid on the house of Vaneyev, on December 20. Six League members were arrested, Lenin among them.

While in prison, Lenin continued to guide the work of the League. In 1896 several more, including Martov, were arrested. Those members of the group still at large however scored a great success organising a strike of the textile workers in St. Petersburg in May 1896. This industrial action lasted three weeks and spread to twenty other factories in Russia in what became the greatest strike in Russian history up to that date.

In 1897, the League created Sankt-Peterburgskiy Rabochiy Listok (Russian: Санкт-Петербургский Рабочий Листок, Saint Petersburg Workers' Paper). It only published two numbers, on February and on September.

By the end of the 1890s the League was transporting its illegal literature through Finland and Stockholm. Transportation was organised by Hjalmar Branting, a Swedish Social-Democrat, Carder, a Norwegian Social-Democrat, and A. Weidel, a Swedish worker who settled in Finland for that purpose. But Garder's arrest in 1900 disrupted the arrangement and the route via Finland. A route running from Stockholm to Åbo (Turku) and across the Russian frontier was restarted in 1901. The group's organization contributed to the founding of the Russian Social Democratic Labor Party in 1898. Lenin went on to become the leader of the Bolshevik faction of the party, while Martov became leader of the Menshevik faction, after the 2nd Congress of the Russian Social Democratic Labor Party in 1903.

Alexander Malchenko abandoned revolutionary politics after returning from exile in 1900. He was later arrested in 1929 as a counter-revolutionary and shot in 1930. Afterwards his image was airbrushed out of an 1897 photo of the seven leaders of the League until his posthumous rehabilitation in 1958.

With Lenin imprisoned, the League (and Rabocheye Delo) fell under the control of the Economists (Marxists who wanted the workers to stick to economic demands only, with no political demands) through their paper Rabochaya Mysl (Russian: Рабочая Mысль, Workers' Thought), published 1897–1902. In the autumn of 1900, the League merged with the St. Petersburg Workers' Organisation.

== See also ==
- Emancipation of Labour
