= All in the Past =

1889 painting by Vassily Maximov

- Всё в прошлом (Russian)
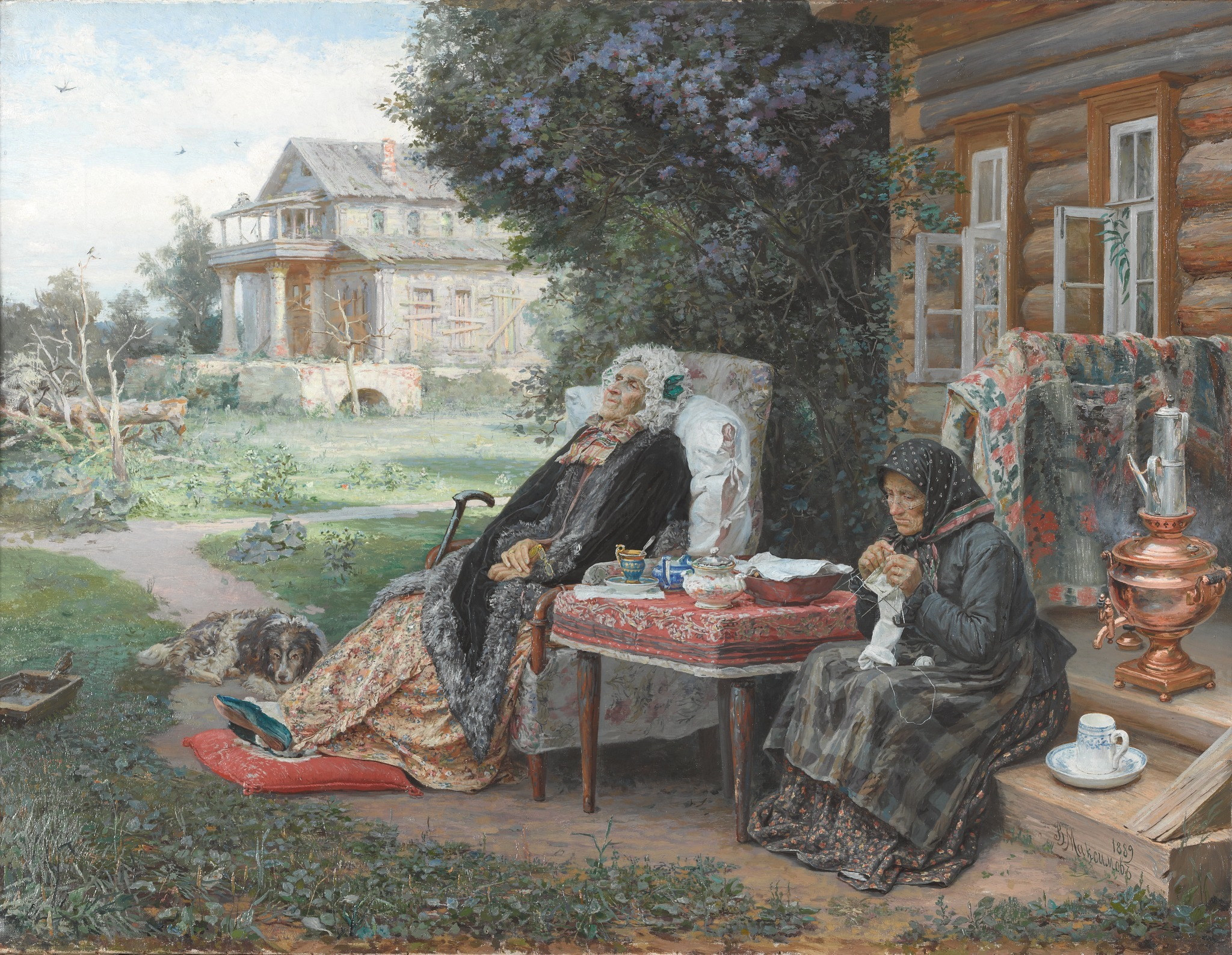
- Artist: Vassily Maximov
- Year: 1889
- Medium: Oil on canvas
- Dimensions: 72 cm × 93.5 cm (28 in × 36.8 in)
- Location: Tretyakov Gallery, Moscow

All in the Past (Russian: Всё в прошлом) is a painting by Russian artist Vassily Maximov (1844–1911), completed in 1889. It belongs to the State Tretyakov Gallery (inventory 589). The size of the canvas is 72×93.5 cm. The painting depicts two elderly women: a lady and her maid, sitting on the wing's threshold of an outhouse on a sunny spring day. In the background, the main building of the estate is in a neglected state, with boarded up windows.

The artist began to think about painting in 1866, when he lived in Shubino, Tver Governorate. In the 1880s he made a number of studies and sketches for the future canvas. Maximov worked on the painting itself in 1888–1889 at the Lubsha estate on the banks of the Volkhov River, which was inherited by his wife Lydia Alexandrovna in 1885.

Work on the painting was completed in early 1889. The canvas was exhibited at the 17th Exhibition of the Society for Travelling Art Exhibitions ("Peredvizhniki"), which opened in St. Petersburg in February 1889. Maximov's painting "was an extraordinary success": the critic Vladimir Stasov wrote that "this is a theme wonderfully taken and wonderfully rendered", and the artist Vasily Polenov noted the "wonderfully true and lively" figures of the barmaid and the maid.

After painting "All in the Past" Maximov had no more works of this level. In order to earn a living for himself and his family, he repeated this painting many times, which was very popular with buyers: in total, more than 40 author's repetitions were written.

The art historian Alexander Zamoshkin, noting the great skill with which the painting "All in the Past" reveals the theme of the collapse of "noble nests", wrote that after the creation of this work Maximov "rightly took a place in the first row of novelists of Russian painting of the 1890-s". According to art historian Alexei Leonov, the artist "created a canvas of deep social meaning and great artistic expressiveness", which became "a symbol of the passing post-reform Russia".

== History ==
=== Previous events ===
Since 1863 Vassily Maximov studied at the Academy of Arts in St. Petersburg, and in 1866 he moved to the village of Shubino, located in Korchevsky uyezd, Tver Governorate, where he worked as an art teacher at the estate of Count Golenishchev-Kutuzov. The artist was impressed by the rich furnishings of the count's estate, along with stories about its former greatness and the fact that now everything is in decline. According to his daughter Ariadna Maximova-Skalozubova, it was there, in Shubino, in 1866, where Vasily Maximov "had the idea of painting 'All in the Past', which he nurtured for almost 30 years".

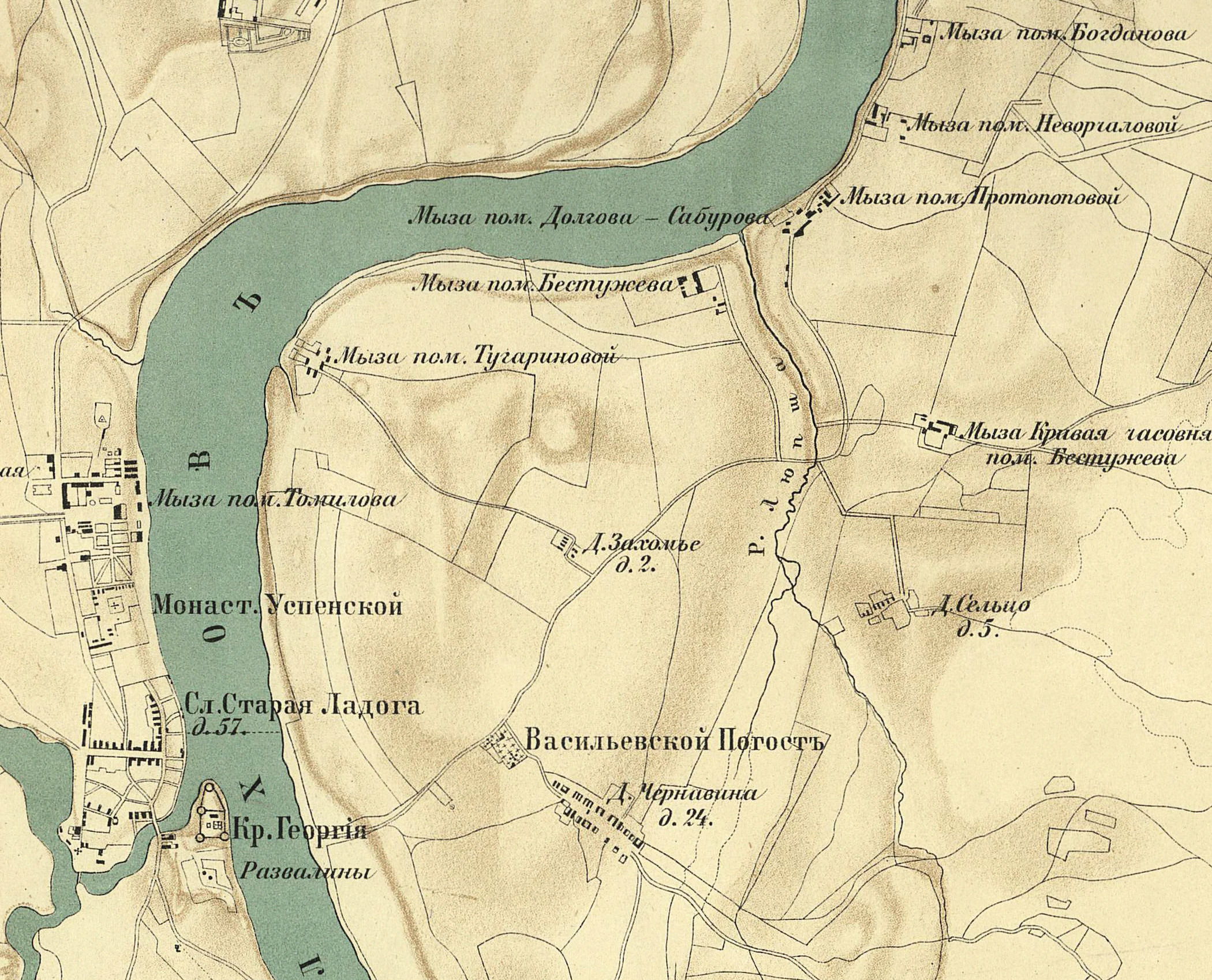
Map of the vicinity of Staraya Ladoga in the first half of the 19th century: the Lubsha estate was located on the right bank of the Volkhov River at the confluence of the Lubsha River into it (on the map - Lupsha)

In the same area Maximov met his future wife, Lydia Alexandrovna, daughter of Alexander Alexandrovich Izmailov, a state councillor (later a full active state councillor), and his wife, Nadezhda Konstantinovna Izmailova, who owned a small estate called Lyubsha, located not far from Staraya Ladoga, on the banks of the Volkhov River (today the place where the estate was located is part of the village of Seltso-Gorka). Maximov, according to his own memories of Lydia Alexandrovna, "fell in love with this wonderful girl, loved her passionately, sacredly". They got married on January 29, 1868.

Alexander Alexandrovich Izmailov died in 1877, and in 1885 Nadezhda Konstantinovna died, and the Maximov family inherited the Lubsha estate from her. Ariadna Maximova-Skalozubova wrote: "Lyusha is a small estate on the right, steep bank of the Volkhov. An old house with blueberry trees under the windows. A large neglected garden descended from the mountain to the shore, surrounded by the debris of slabs and fences, with a deep well at the bottom of the garden, in the shade of century-old firs, with a lime avenue, lilac bushes, roses and acacias, raspberries, gooseberries, currants". The garden of this estate and served as a setting for the painting, conceived many years ago, and the prototype of the bar house was a neighboring house, which belonged to the landlady Bogdanova. This house is depicted in the sketch, which was probably made by the artist in the early 1880s and later came into the collection of A. V. Maximova-Skalova. V. Maximova-Skalozubova.

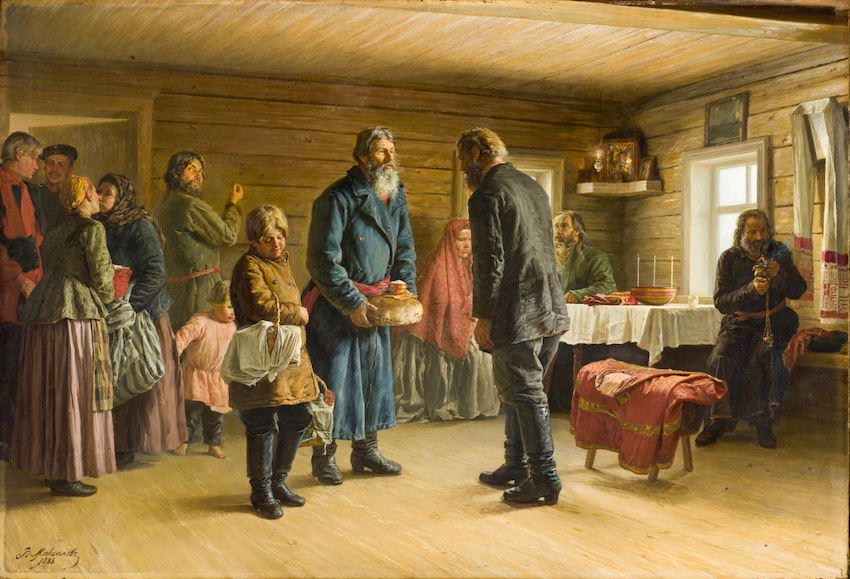
В. M. Maximov. Housewarming, 1888, Musée d'Orsay

The first sketch of the future painting appeared in 1885, and for the next two years Maximov was busy organizing the estate. In 1887, the construction of living quarters and the artist's studio, which was also located in the manor house, was completed. In the same year, Maximov celebrated a house-warming party and soon painted a picture on a related theme, called "Housewarming" (now in the Musée d'Orsay). Apparently, after its completion, the artist set about creating a new canvas — "All in the Past", on which he worked in 1888 and 1889.

In a letter to the artist Ilya Ostroukhov dated December 5, 1895, Maximov told about the creation of the painting "Everything in the Past":"I composed the house and the whole landscape before I worked on the figures, over whose twists and turns I pondered for a long time, and only in the painting itself did I come up with an idea, which I worked on with charcoal.The whole costume and all the furnishings were a legacy from my mother-in-law, a Frantikha professor of the forties". Maximov wrote a number of landscape studies for the painting. Among his works from this period is "Sunset Landscape" (1888), which was in the Tretyakov Gallery, and then through the State Museum Fund was transferred to the Zlatoust City Local History Museum.

In a letter to Pavel Tretyakov dated January 14, 1889, Maximov used the name "Forgotten Villa" for his new painting — he wrote: "I'm looking forward to a visit to my dreary studio, fellow painters, to say something about my "Forgotten Villa"? But three months later, in a letter to Tretyakov dated April 8, 1889, Maximov already used the title "All in the Past", which had been fixed for this painting.

=== The 17th Travelling Exhibition and next events ===
The painting "All in the Past" was completed in early 1889. It was exhibited at the 17th Exhibition of the Society for Travelling Art ("Peredvizhniki"), which opened in St. Petersburg on February 26, 1889 (Note: The Julian calendar ("old style") is used to date events that took place in the Russian Empire.) and moved to Moscow in April of that year. The St. Petersburg part of the exhibition was held in Botkina's house on Sergievskaya Street (now Tchaikovsky Street), and the Moscow part in the building of the Moscow School of Painting, Sculpture and Architecture. In the same year the painting was bought from the author by Pavel Tretyakov. In May 1889 the 17th traveling exhibition continued its journey through other cities of the Russian Empire, which ended in early January 1890. During this time the exhibition visited Astrakhan (in May), Saratov (in June), Kharkov (in September), Poltava (in October), Odesa (in November) and Kyiv (in December–January).

The painting "All in the Past" was the only work by Maximov presented at the exhibition, and it received good reviews from the audience and critics. In a letter to his wife Natalya Vasilyevna dated February 21, 1889, the artist Vasily Polenov wrote: "Maximov has painted a picture called "All in the Past". The old landowner-lady sits in an old armchair on the balcony of the porch and dreams <...>, and her keywoman sits on a ledge and knits. Wonderful two figures, wonderfully true and alive". Maximov and the art critic Vladimir Stasov, who published a review of the traveling exhibition "Our Wandering Artists Now" in April 1889 in the magazine "Severny Vestnik", were positive about the new painting. However, not all reviews were unambiguously positive — in particular, in an article published in the journal "Russian Mind" (May 1889 issue), the writer Mitrofan Remezov called Maximov's painting "weak in execution", noting that in this particular case "the content of the work largely redeems some of the shortcomings of the execution".

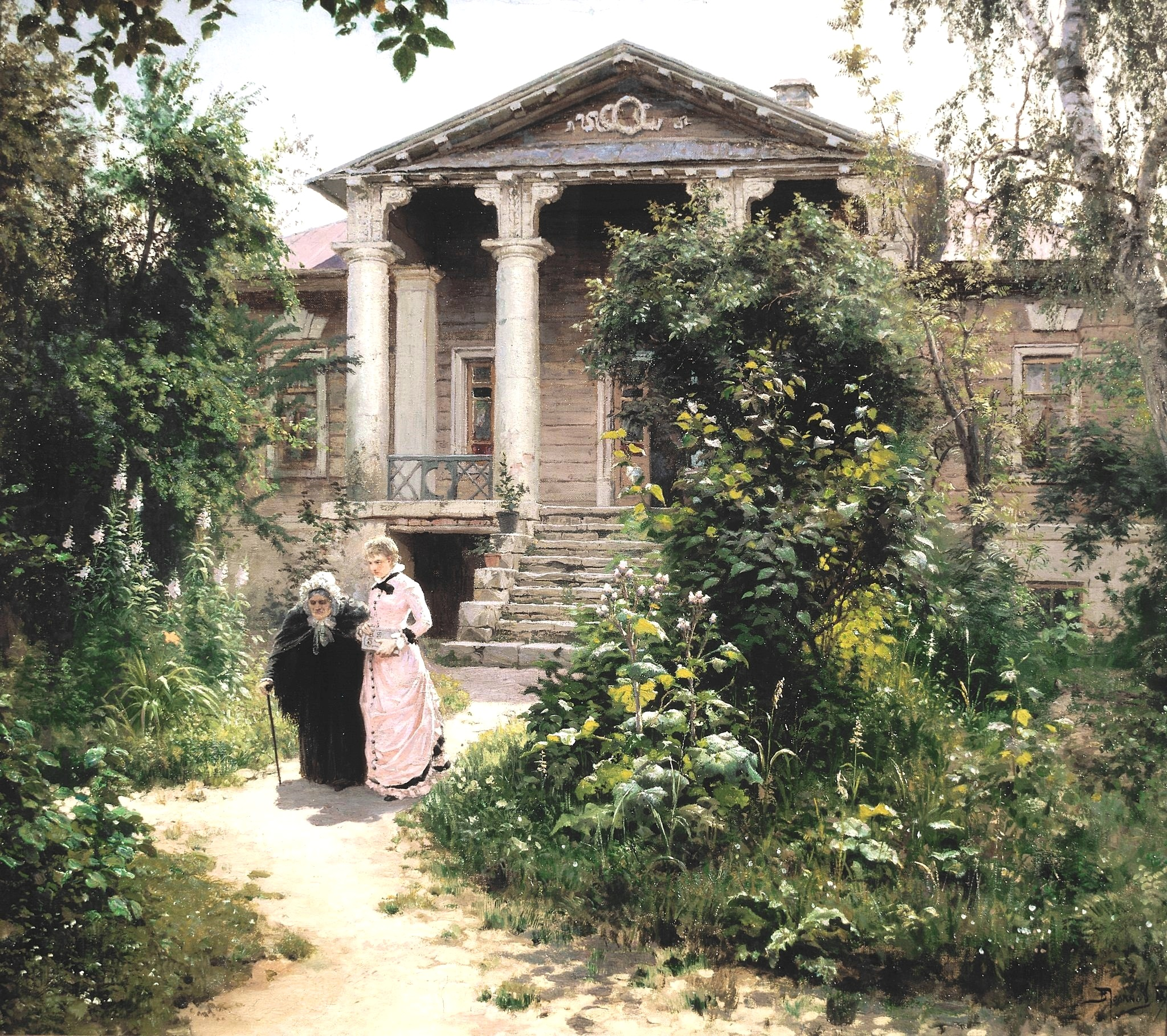
V. D. Polenov. Grandmother's Garden, 1878, State Tretyakov Gallery

After painting "All in the Past", Maximov had no more works of this level. To make ends meet, he repeated the painting, which was still popular, many times, with a total of 42 author's repetitions. Discussing the reasons why the author's versions of the painting "All in the Past" were more popular than the repetitions of other paintings by Maximov, the art historian Alexei Leonov wrote that "it was probably due to its poetically told theme, which found an echo in the soul of each viewer and awakened in many memories of the past, of his youth, of the lived life". The title of the painting is associated with the consolidation of the catchphrase "All in the Past" in the culture. It was known before, but it was the popularity of Maximov's work that caused its widespread use.

According to Ariadna Maximova-Skalozubova, in the early 1930s the paintings "Grandmother's Garden" by Vasily Polenov and "Everything in the Past" by Vasily Maximov were exhibited in the Tretyakov Gallery with the additional "shameful" inscription "Noble reactionary painting". Maximova-Skalozubova considered this "an unfair, rude denigration of her father — an artist-democrat," and told of her naive desire at the time to save money and buy her father's painting from the gallery.

Subsequently, the painting "All in the Past" was exhibited at a number of exhibitions in the USSR and Russia, as well as in other countries of Europe, Asia and North America. In 1971-1972 the canvas took part in the exhibitions "Peredvizhniki in the State Tretyakov Gallery" (Moscow) and "Domestic Painting of the Peredvizhniki" (Leningrad, Kyiv, Minsk), which were held on the occasion of the 100th anniversary of the Peredvizhniki Society. In 1972-1973 it was exhibited at the exhibition "Russian Realism" in Baden-Baden, Prague, Dortmund and Bratislava, in 1973-1974 — at the exhibitions of Russian art in Bucharest and Warsaw, in 1981 — at the exhibition "Russian Realist Art of the Second Half of the 19th century from the Collection of the State Tretyakov Gallery" organized in Alma-Ata, in 1986-1987 — at the exhibition of works from the collections of the State Tretyakov Gallery and the Russian Museum in Washington, Chicago, Boston and Los Angeles, and in 1990 — at the exhibition of works of Russian artists in Kasama and Sapporo. The painting was also one of the exhibits at the exhibition "Russian Life" held in Chelyabinsk in October–December 2020.

== Description ==
In the foreground are two elderly women: the landowner lady and her maid. Both are sitting on the threshold of the outhouse, while in the background the main building of the manor is in a desolate state, with boarded up windows. Around them are withered trees, and where flowerbeds once stood, there are piles of driftwood. A lilac bush blossoms on the outbuilding, and the lady and the maid sit in its shade on this sunny spring day. The theme chosen by the artist recalls the motifs of Ivan Kramskoi's paintings "Inspection of an Old House" (1874, State Tretyakov Gallery) and Vasily Polenov's "Grandmother's Garden" (1878, State Tretyakov Gallery) as well as Anton Chekhov's 1903 play "The Cherry Orchard". The cut down old tree and the stunted young growth "are perceived as a kind of metaphor, reminding of the extinction of 'noble nests'".

The landlady is sitting in a soft armchair with a meditative look, her eyes half closed. She has a noble stature, preserved in spite of her advanced age. She has a snow-white bonnet on her head, golden rings on her hands, and soft slippers on her feet. She wears a dress with an elegant bow, and a velvet talma trimmed with fur. In her lowered hand she holds a lorgnette. A cushion is placed under her feet, next to which a spaniel, also old, whose canine life is also over, nestles. Compared to the sketch, the image of the Barynitsa in the painting has become more complex. Obviously, she remembers something from her past life, while "she is full of consciousness of her former dignity" — "before us stands the barynya, once imperious and cruel". For her portrait Maximov posed his sister-in-law Varvara — the wife of his brother Alexei. The artist had worked with her before: a quarter of a century earlier she had served as a model for her mother in the painting "The Sick Child" (1864), and also posed for the canvas "Grandma's Fairy Tales" (1867).

The maid is sitting on a ledge. The artist has portrayed her as a simple old peasant woman from the countryside. She is dressed in a colorful skirt and sweater with a dark apron tied over it. On her head is a satin shawl. She is still at work, knitting a stocking, deep in thought and memory. Apparently, the lonely woman stayed voluntarily to live out her life next to her mistress. According to art historian Margarita Chizhmak, "as if female happiness had not happened —"wedding ring"— thrown over her ring finger woolen thread unfinished stocking of white color, symbolizing purity".

Fragments of the painting &amp;amp;amp;amp;amp;amp;amp;amp;amp;quot;All in the Past&amp;amp;amp;amp;amp;amp;amp;amp;amp;quot;

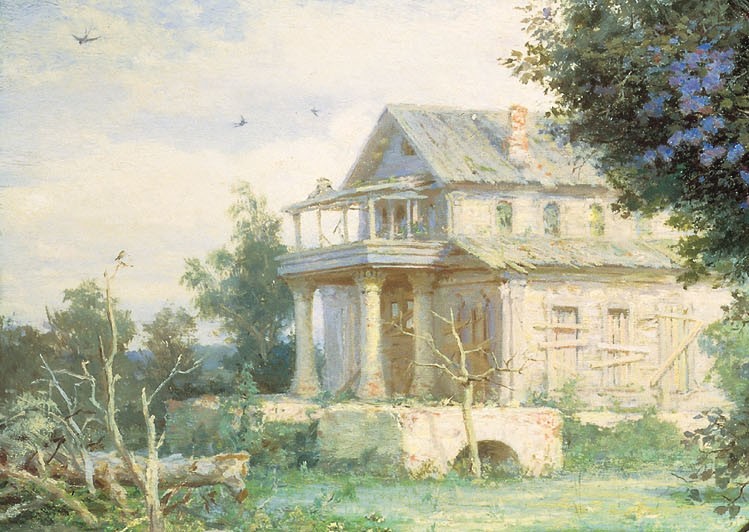
Abandoned house

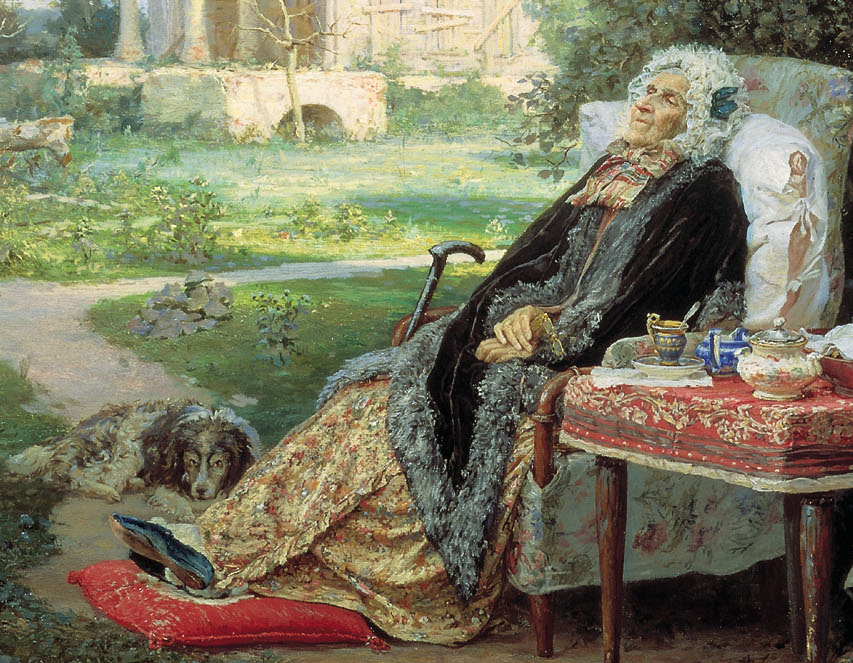
An old lady

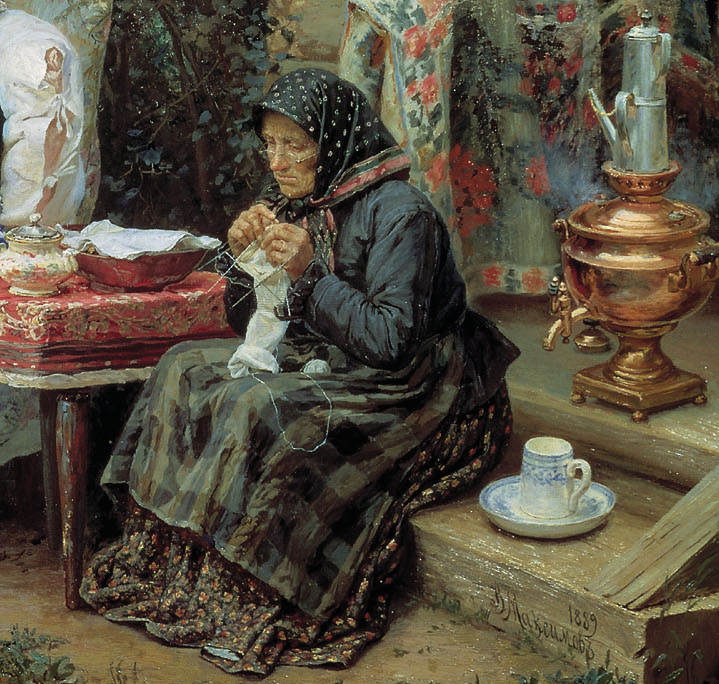
A maid

Between the lady and the maid there is a table covered with an embroidered tablecloth, on which are placed expensive porcelains, left over from earlier times. Next to the maid is an old-fashioned copper samovar with a coffee pot on the burner. The appearance of the samovar was discussed in the correspondence of Vasily Maximov and Pavel Tretyakov; in particular, in a letter dated April 11, 1889, Tretyakov wrote: "In the summer you must make a sketch of a samovar, only really old, and then, in the winter, somehow fit it into the picture. I can bring it to you then".

The artist skillfully shows the contrast between the two women, who belong to different social types, representing different classes of the old village. This contrast is particularly emphasized by the cups from which they are drinking tea — an elegant golde plating porcelain cup in the lady's hand and a massive cup in the hand of the maid who is standing next to her on the staircase. Apparently, she does not dare to put the cup on the table used by the lady.

Landscape plays an important role in the composition of the painting. According to art historian Alexei Leonov, the painting "All in the Past" shows the artist's achievements in landscape painting: "How the gamut has brightened, how it saturated light-air tonalities, how well written lilacs in the shade and how flooded with sunshine old, battered bar house!" At the same time, the art historian Sophia Goldstein noted that Maximov did not find in this work an organic realization of the principles of plein air conquered by Russian art at that time. According to Goldstein, "striving to convey the light and air environment, to achieve a more complete and coherent perception of nature, he [Maximov], at the same time, comes to an excessive motley and colorful, noticeable and in the figures, and especially in the landscape". Vasily Polenov also criticized the landscape component of the painting: in a letter to his wife on February 21, 1889, he wrote that Maximov "feels the form, but the landscape, ie in the distance destroyed former grandeur — bad to the point of naivety".

== Sketches and repetitions of the painting ==
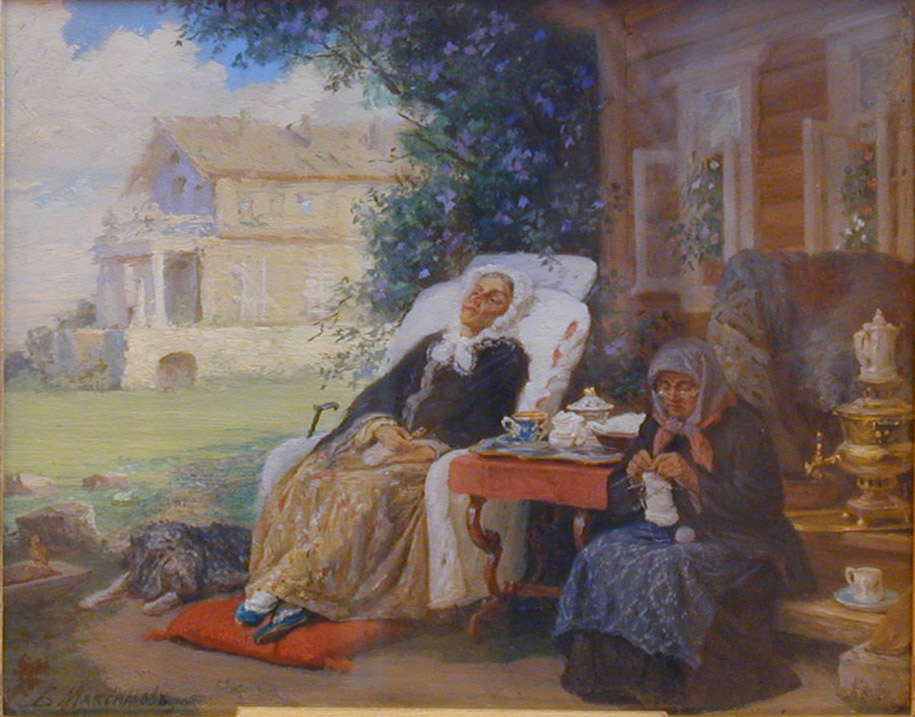
Sketch of the painting "All in the Past", 1885 or 1888, Ivanovo Regional Art Museum

One of the earliest graphic sketches of the painting, dated 1868, has survived and is in a private collection in Moscow. Several paintings and graphic sketches are in the State Russian Museum in St. Petersburg. In addition, there are sketches of this painting in a private collection, formerly belonging to A. V. Maximova-Skalova. V. Maximova-Skalozubova (Samarovo village, Tyumen oblast).

Art historian Alexei Leonov's monograph in his work on Vassily Maximov's discusses in detail the 1885 sketch (canvas, oil, 21.2×26.2 cm), which Maximov sent to artist Ilya Ostroukhov in 1895. In a letter to Ostroukhov dated December 5, 1895, Maximov wrote: "The price is 25 rubles, and if you do not need the sketch, do not like it, sell it for more, for which I will thank you, but, my friend, it would be more pleasant for you to keep it, as this sketch is the only one on which I worked on my painting". Subsequently, this sketch passed from the collection of Ilya Ostroukhov to the collection of the Tretyakov Gallery and then to the collection of the Ivanovo Regional Art Museum (inv. ZhR-170, now dated 1888).

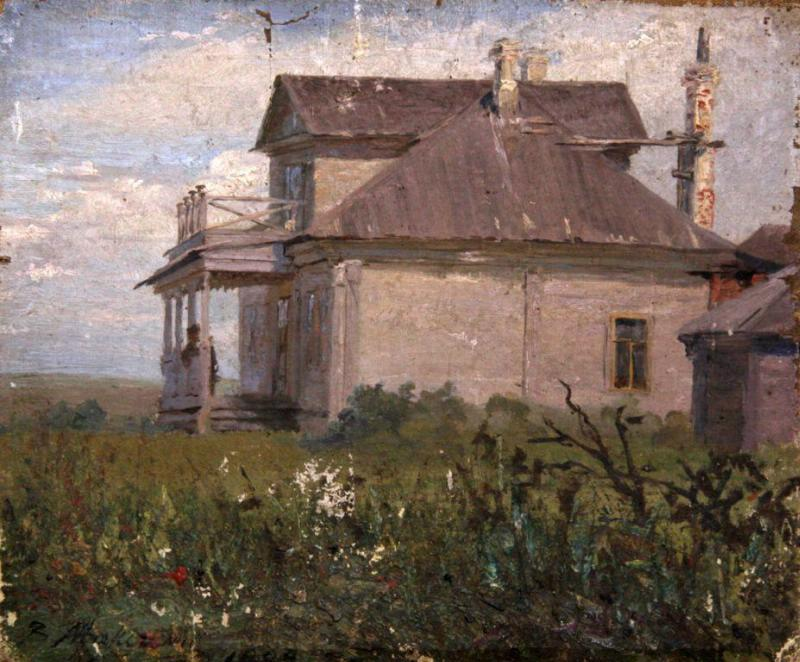
Sketch for the painting "All in the Past" (1880s, I. Y. Slovtsov Museum Complex)

The Tyumen Museum of Fine Arts has a sketch for the painting "All in the Past" (1880s, canvas on cardboard, oil, 31×34.5 cm, inventory number IK-990), depicting a house with a mezzanine and a veranda. Previously this sketch was in the collection of A. V. Maksimova-Skalo. V. Maximova-Skalozubova. Apparently this sketch depicting the house of the landowner Bogdanova was painted by Maximov in the early 1880s. The sketch is badly preserved, in some places the paint has fallen off. Probably for this reason the canvas was removed from the stretcher and glued to cardboard.

The picture 'All in the Past' has been repeated several times. One of them, painted in the 1890s, is in the collection of the Belarusian National Arts Museum. In the State Tretyakov Gallery there is a reduced repetition of the painting (1900, cardboard, oil, 27×35.5 cm, inv. no. Zh-1752), which was received in 1973 from the Oktyabrsky District Finance Department of Moscow (perhaps it was previously in the collection of A. P. Langovoy). The State Russian Museum in St. Petersburg also has a copy of the painting "All in the Past", executed in half the size of the original (1890s, cardboard, oil, 37.5×45.9 cm, inv. Zh-12061, received in 2000 as a gift from St. Petersburg collectors Yakov Rzhevsky and Joseph Rzhevsky).

Other painting's repetitions made by the author are located at the Arkhangelsk Museum of Fine Art (1904, canvas or cardboard, oil, 33.5×47.5 cm, inv. Zh-1445), the Kislovodsk Museum of N. A. Yaroshenko (paper, cardboard, wood, oil, 20×27.5 cm, inv. Zh-244), Kursk State Art Gallery named after A. A. Deineka (1902, canvas or cardboard, oil, 33.5×47.5 cm, inv. Zh-1414), Vladimir-Suzdal Historical and Artistic-Architectural Museum of the artist N. A. Yaroshenko (paper, cardboard, wood, oil, 20×27.5 cm, inv. Zh. A. Deineka (1902, cardboard, oil, 20.9×25.6 cm, inv. Zh-1414), Vladimir-Suzdal Historical and Artistic and Architectural Museum-Reserve (canvas, oil, 69.5×93.5 cm, inv. Zh-1143), Chuvash State Art Museum (1897, canvas, oil, 23.5×28 cm, inv. KP-2432) and other collections.

The State Tretyakov Gallery has a copy of the painting in sepia on paper (1895, 34×47 cm, inv. 7291). The sepia painting of another author is kept in the State Russian Museum (1895, 34,3×45 cm).

== Reviews ==
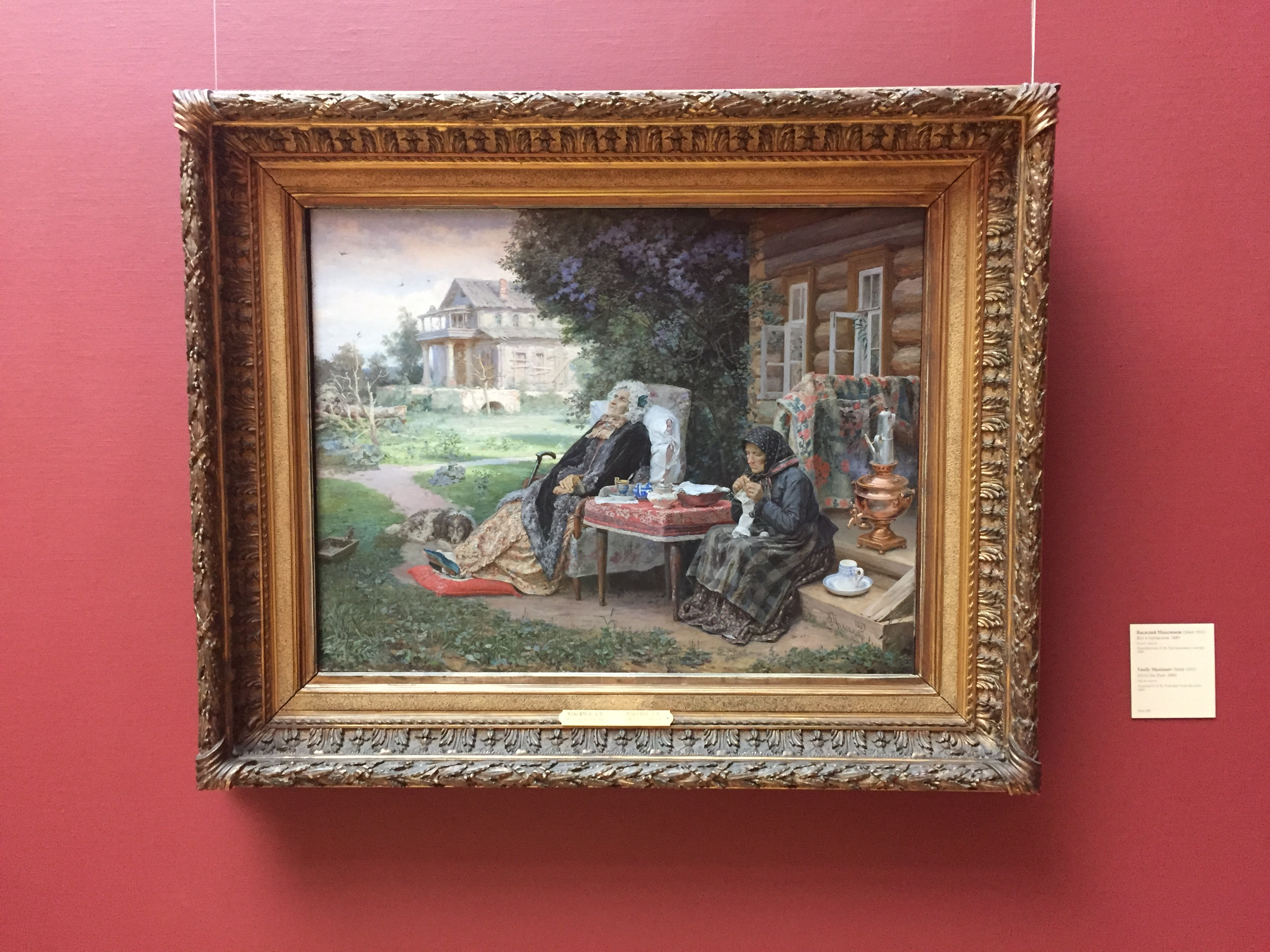
Painting "All in the Past" in the State Tretyakov Gallery.

In the article "Our Peredvizhniki Artists Today" published in the April 1889 issue of Severny Vestnik, the art critic Vladimir Stasov praised the painting "Everything in the Past". In his opinion, this painting "represents a great unity" in the history of Maximov's work, and it became the artist's most significant achievement since the painting "The Magician's Arrival at a Peasant's Wedding", painted in 1875. Commenting on the subject of the painting — "an old landowner living the last years of her life, stretched out on a chair in the garden, gnawed by the memories of the past", Stasov noted that "this is a theme wonderfully taken and wonderfully conveyed". Based on his impressions of the picture, Stasov came to the following conclusion: "Maximov is not extinguished and has not faded. He still has a good feeling for Russian life. He will probably do a lot of good. Even his coloring has gained liveliness and elegance".

The artist Yakov Minchenkov in his "Memories of the Peredvizhniki" noted that of all Maximov's works "the greatest popularity in society received his painting "All in the Past". Minchenkov wrote: "And we must agree that the picture is deeply felt and conveys a certain era. In the fading old landlady, living out his last days in a poor peasant environment, perfectly expressed the memory of the former wide and luxurious landlord's life". Minchenkov regretfully noted that this picture "was the sweet song in Vassily Maximov's work".

Art historian Alexander Zamoshkin called the painting "All in the Past" a "novel" and wrote that its theme —"the disintegration of "noble nests" in the conditions of life in post-reform Russia"— was revealed by Maximov with great skill. According to him, the picture is written in "light and sound," everything is told very subtly — in particular, "the connection of the two main psychological motifs" is shown extremely convincingly. Zamoshkin noted that the image of the old Barynitsa reminds of Arina Petrovna Golovleva from the novel by Mikhail Saltykov-Shchedrin "The Golovlyov Family", while the image of the other woman "is also perfectly given", "it has so much Russian kindness and warmth". According to Zamoshkin, after the creation of this work Maximov "rightly took a place in the first row of novelists of Russian painting of the 1890-s".

The art historian Alexei Leonov noted that in emphasizing the social inequality of the two old women —the landlady and the maid— Maximov "did not leave out a single essential detail so that it would not serve his artistic purpose". According to Leonov, Maximov's painting "was an extraordinary success" — the artist "created a canvas of deep social meaning and great artistic expressiveness", which became "a symbol of the passing post-reform Russia".

Art historian Margarita Chizhmak wrote that the painting "All in the Past" occupies a special place in Maximov's creative heritage and is rightly considered "one of the most soulful works among the paintings of the Peredvizhniki". According to Chizhmak, the painting has not lost its charm in the time that has passed since it was painted and "appears in the halls of the Tretyakov Gallery as a wonderful 'stiry' of landed Russia with its characters, way of life and manners".

== Bibliography ==
- Алдонина, Р. П. (2007). Василий Максимов (in Russian) (Мастера живописи ed.). Москва: Белый город. p. 48. ISBN 978-5-7793-1220-2.
- Васильева-Шляпина, Г. Л. (2007). Изобразительное искусство (in Russian). Москва: Академический проект и Фонд «Мир». p. 528. ISBN 978-5-8291-0874-8.
- Гольдштейн, С. Н. (1965). Развитие бытового жанра в 1870—1880-е годы (in Russian). Vol. 9 (История русского искусства ed.). Москва: И. Э. Грабарь, В. С. Кеменов, В. Н. Лазарев. pp. 300–361.
- Гомберг-Вержбинская, Э. П. (1970). Передвижники (in Russian) (Искусство ed.). Ленинград. p. 236.
- Замошкин, А. И. (1950). Максимов. (Очерки по истории русской живописи второй половины XIX века (in Russian) (Издательство Государственной Третьяковской галереи ed.). Москва. p. 32.
- Лазуко, А. К. (1982). Василий Максимов. Массовая библиотека по искусству (in Russian) (Художник РСФСР ed.). Ленинград. p. 80.
- Леонов, А. И. (1951). Василий Максимов. Жизнь и творчество (in Russian) (Искусство ed.). Москва. p. 347.
- Метёлкина, А. Г. (2008). Максимов Василий Максимович. Русские живописцы XVIII—XIX века. Биографический словарь (in Russian) (Азбука-Классики ed.). Санкт-Петербург: Е. Ф. Петинова. pp. 404–406. ISBN 978-5-91181-923-1.
- Минченков, Я. Д. (1965). Воспоминания о передвижниках (in Russian) (Художник РСФСР ed.). Ленинград. p. 360.
- Поленов, В. Д. (1950). Сахарова, Е. В. (ed.). Письма, дневники, воспоминания (in Russian) (Искусство ed.). Москва. p. 520.
- Ремезов, М. Н. (М. Анютин) (1889). Современное искусство (PDF). Русская мысль (in Russian) (Искусство ed.). Москва. pp. 188–201. Archived from the original (PDF) on 2021-10-18.
- Рогинская, Ф. С. (1989). Товарищество передвижных художественных выставок (in Russian) (Искусство ed.). Москва. p. 430.
- Станкевич, Н. И. (1971). Сергей Арсеньевич Виноградов (in Russian) (Искусство ed.). Москва. p. 151.
- Стасов, В. В. (1954). Статьи и заметки, публиковавшиеся в газетах и не вошедшие в книжные издания (in Russian). Vol. 2 (Издательство Академии художеств СССР ed.). Москва.
- Чижмак, М. С. (2015). Дивная повесть о минувшем. Картина В. М. Максимова "Всё в прошлом". Русское искусство (in Russian). Vol. 2 (Издательство Академии художеств СССР ed.). pp. 72–75.
- Шулежкова, С. Г. (2011). «И жизнь, и слёзы, и любовь…» Происхождение, значение, судьба 1500 крылатых слов и выражений русского языка (in Russian) (Флинта ed.). Москва. p. 848. ISBN 978-5-9765-1030-2.
- В. Максимов. 50 художников — шедевры русской живописи (in Russian). Vol. 47 (Де Агостини ed.). Москва. 2011. p. 32. ISBN 978-5-9765-1030-2.
- Брук Я. В., Иовлева Л. И., ed. (2011). Государственная Третьяковская галерея — каталог собрания. Живопись второй половины XIX века (in Russian). Vol. 4 (Красная площадь ed.). Москва. p. 528. ISBN 978-5-900743-56-1.
- Г. Н. Голдовский, В. А. Леняшин, ed. (2016). Государственный Русский музей — каталог собрания (in Russian). Vol. 6: Живопись второй половины XIX века (К—М) (Palace Editions ed.). Санкт-Петербург. p. 176. ISBN 978-5-93332-565-9.
- Собко Н. П., ed. (1997) [1963]. Иллюстрированный каталог XVII передвижной выставки "Товарищества передвижных художественных выставок" (in Russian). Vol. 6: Живопись второй половины XIX века (К—М) (Типография М. М. Стасюлевича ed.). Санкт-Петербург: Palace edition. p. 48. ISBN 9785933325659.
- Горкин А. П., ed. (2007). Искусство. Современная иллюстрированная энциклопедия (in Russian). Vol. 3 (Л—П) (Росмэн ed.). Москва. p. 296. ISBN 978-5-353-02798-0.
- Андреева В. В.; Астафьева М. В.; Гольдштейн С. Н.; Приймак Н. Л., eds. (1987). Товарищество передвижных художественных выставок. Письма, документы. 1869—1899 (in Russian) (Искусство ed.). Москва. p. 668.
