= Aleksandr Martynov (Russian politician) =

Russian politician (1865–1935)

Aleksandr Samoilovich Martynov
- Александр Самойлович Мартынов
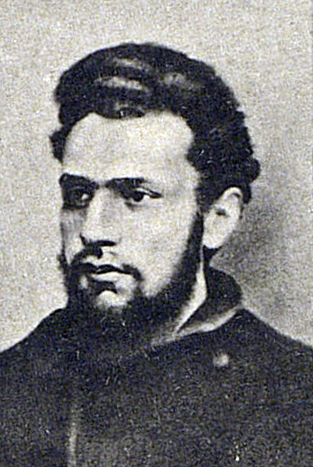
- Martynov in 1906
- Born: Aleksandr Samoilovich Pikker; 24 December [O.S. 12 December] 1865; Pinsk, Minsk Province, Russian Empire
- Died: June 5, 1935 (aged 69); Moscow, USSR
- Political party: Russian Social Democratic Labour Party, Mensheviks

Alexandr Martynov (Alexandr Martinov; also, Aleksandr Samoilovich Pikker; (Note: Russian: Александр Самойлович Мартынов - Пиккер)) (Russian: Александр Самойлович Мартынов) (12 December 1865 – 5 June 1935) was a leading Menshevik politician before the Russian Revolution of 1917, and for a few years after the revolution a critic of Leon Trotsky's theory of permanent revolution (1923). (Note: According to Leon Trotsky)

== Biography ==
The son of a Jewish timber merchant, Martynov joined The People's Will in 1884, and was arrested three times in 1886–1889, and deported for ten years to the Kolyma region. He became a Marxist after his release, and joined the social democrats in 1899. In 1901, he emigrated to Switzerland and joined the Union of Russian Social Democrats Abroad As chief editor of the magazine Rabocheye Delo he was a leader of the Economist faction of the RSDLP. He proposed that the RSDLP should be guided by spontaneous initiatives by Russian workers, and confront the government on specific issues of pay and working conditions, where there was a reasonable chance of achieving specific improvements, because “the economic struggle is the most widely applicable means of drawing the masses into active political struggle.” He accused the editors of Iskra of focusing too much on long term political issues that were too far removed from the workers' immediate experience. Lenin devoted whole sections of his pamphlet What Is to Be Done?. published in 1902, to attacking 'Economists' for being "determined always to follow behind the movement and be its tail..." Specifically, he said that Martynov's error was thinking that "it is possible to develop the class political consciousness of the workers from within" when, according to Lenin, "class political consciousness can be brought to the workers only from without."

Martynov was one of two 'Economist' delegates to the RSDLP congress in Brussels in July 1903, and gave a lengthy response to Lenin's attack, claiming that Lenin's reliance on professional revolutionaries "opens a deep fissure between the leading elements of the movement and the working-class masses, between the activity of an exclusive party and the broad struggle of the working class." But he and his fellow Economist Vladimir Makhnovets walked out after the Congress declined to recognise the Union of Russian Social Democrats Abroad as a constituent organisation, so neither was present when the RSDLP split into two factions, the Bolsheviks and Mensheviks. Later, he joined the Mensheviks, and was one of the faction's leading theorists. Trotsky described him as the "semi-official philosopher of Menshevist tactics."

In January 1905, just before the start of the 1905 revolution, Martynov published an essay Two Dictatorships in which he forecast that the Russian aristocracy was about to be overthrown and replaced by a 'bourgeois' government, and argued that the RSDLP "is and should remain the party of the extreme opposition, unlike all the other parties, which can count on joining in the government of a bourgeois society." Later in the year, he acknowledged that there had been a "tremendous explosion" of working class resistance, and only a "timorous" reaction from the bourgeoisie, but "It does not at all contradict the fact that the present Russian revolution is a bourgeois revolution." Lenin's sarcastic response was that "admirers of Martynov repeat the lessons of peaceful parliamentarism just at a time when, as they themselves state, actual hostilities have commenced. There is nothing more ridiculous than this pompous emphasis of the slogan 'extreme opposition'."

Returning to Saint Petersburg late in summer 1905, Martynov took on the editorship of the newspaper Nachalo, and seeing how little the Kadets were able to control events, he concluded: "The Social Democrats alone have boldly raised the slogan of permanent revolution at the present time, they alone will lead the masses to the last and decisive victory. 'Permanent revolution' was a slogan used by Trotsky, who believed that the revolution would be led by the workers' soviets. But, going back into exile after the revolution had been suppressed, Martynov disowned what he called this "fantastic theory". He was a member of the Menshevik Organisation Committee from 1912, and supported the Menshevik Internationalists during the war, most of which he spent in Switzerland. He returned to Russia by train through with Julius Martov and others, and like Martov, was one of the minority who opposed the war effort. He was elected to the Menshevik Central Committee in December 1917, but he broke with the party in 1918, during the Russian Civil War.

After the introduction of the NEP, Martynov claimed that there no longer was an ideological difference between him and the Soviet government. He was admitted to the Communist Party in 1923, and loyally supported Joseph Stalin for the rest of his life.

In the 1920s, Martynov worked as a researcher at the Marx–Engels–Lenin Institute and a lecturer at the Communist Academy and the Sverdlov Communist University, and from 1924, he worked for the Communist International. He became one of the Soviet Union's leading spokesmen on world communism. He advocated for the Chinese Communist Party to subordinate itself to the Kuomintang, until the debacle of the Guangzhou Uprising. In 1930, he claimed that the rise of the Nazi party was "necessary condition" for the "decisive" victory of the workers' revolution.

== Personality ==
According to Nikolai Valentinov, who met Martynov in exile in Switzerland in 1904, he was a fine raconteur. "No one could have imagined that this fat, unattractive-looking man with a lisp, who suffered from a dreadful form of eczema on his hands and head, had a tremendous gift of poetical description," he wrote, adding that he "could not understand" how Martynov could have become a communist.

== See also ==
- Collectivization in the Soviet Union
