= Israel Getzler =

Historian

- Born: May 14, 1920; Berlin
- Died: January 8, 2012 (aged 91)
- Occupation: Historian of Eastern Europe

Israel Getzler (Hebrew: ישראל גצלר; 1920–2012) was a historian of Russia and the Soviet Union.

He lived in Germany until about 1938 when he was deported to Poland by the Nazis. Eventually, he arrived in the Soviet Union and was placed in a Siberian Gold-mining settlement. Following World War II he moved to Australia. He gained a tenured position at Adelaide University. He later went to work at Stanford University. In the early 1970s he became a professor at the Hebrew University of Jerusalem. He was an active participant in anti-settler demonstrations.

== Works ==
- Martov: A Political Biography of a Russian Social Democrat (1967)
- Neither Toleration nor Favor: The Australian Chapter of Jewish Emancipation (1970)
- Kronstadt 1917–1921: The Fate of a Soviet Democracy (1983)
- Nikolai Sukhanov: Chronicler of the Russian Revolution (2002)
