= Julius Martov =

Russian Marxist theorist and revolutionary (1873–1923)

- Юлий Мартов
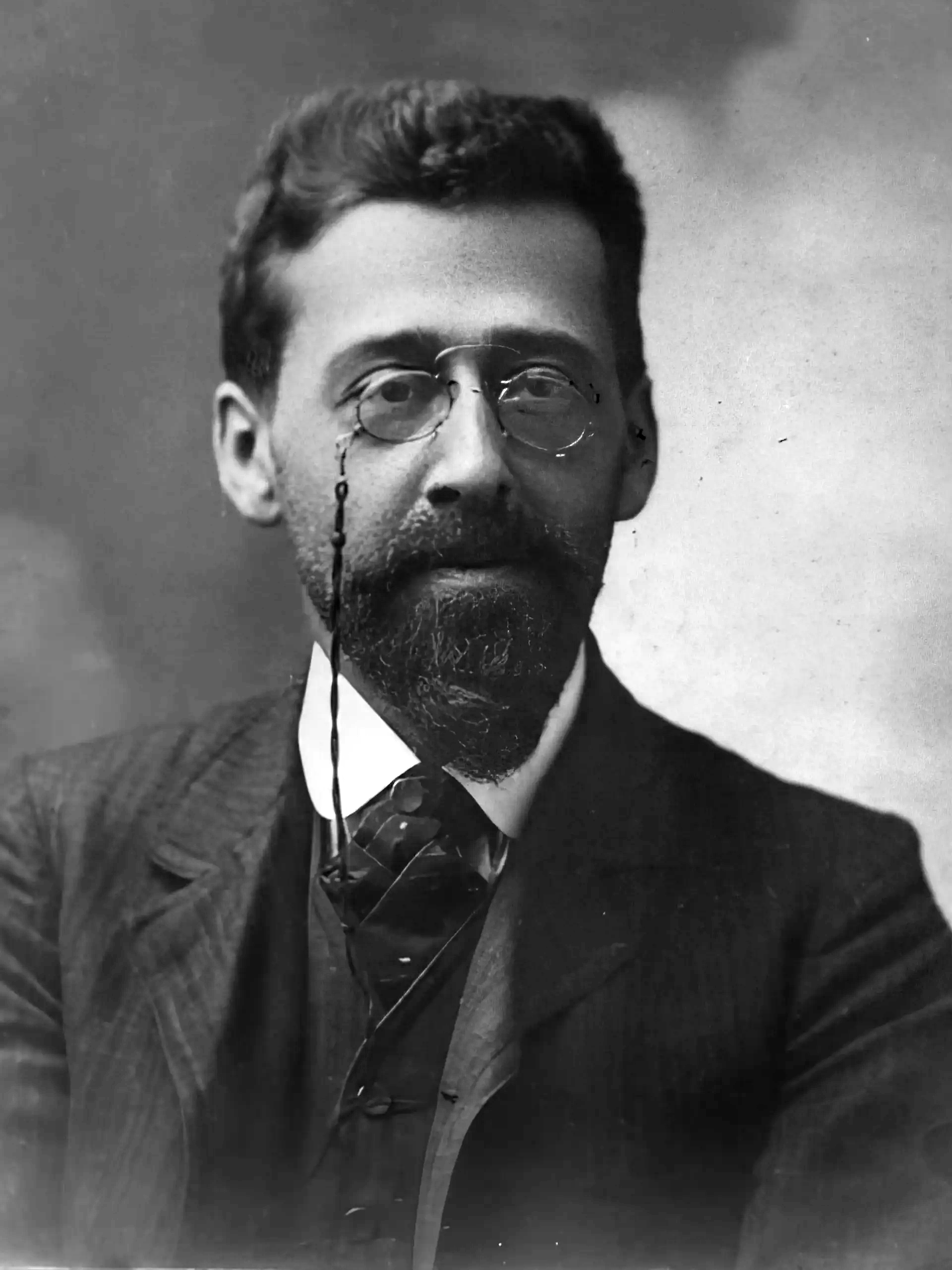
- Martov in 1910
- Born: Yuliy Osipovich Tsederbaum; 24 November 1873; Constantinople, Ottoman Empire
- Died: 4 April 1923 (aged 49); Schömberg, Württemberg, Germany
- Other name: L. Martov
- Education: Saint Petersburg Imperial University
- Known for: Leader of the Mensheviks
- Political party: Russian Social Democratic Labour Party
- Movement: Marxism, socialist internationalism
- Relatives: Lydia Dan (sister)

Yuliy Osipovich Tsederbaum (Note: In this name that follows East Slavic naming customs, the patronymic is Osipovich and the family name is Tsederbaum.) (Note: Russian: Юлий Осипович Цедербаум, IPA: [ˈjʉlʲɪj ˈosʲɪpəvʲɪtɕ tsɨdʲɪrˈbaʊm].) (24 November 1873 – 4 April 1923), better known as Julius Martov, (Note: Юлий Мартов, IPA: [ˈmartəf].) was a Russian Marxist theorist, revolutionary, and a leader of the Mensheviks, the minority faction of the Russian Social Democratic Labour Party (RSDLP). A close friend and collaborator of Vladimir Lenin in the early years of their revolutionary careers, he became his chief rival after the RSDLP split at its Second Congress in 1903.

Born into a middle-class, assimilated Jewish family in Constantinople, Martov became a Marxist activist in the Russian Empire in the early 1890s. With Lenin, he co-founded the League of Struggle for the Emancipation of the Working Class in 1895. Both were arrested shortly after and exiled to Siberia. After his exile, Martov joined Lenin and Georgy Plekhanov in founding the party newspaper Iskra, which became the primary organ of the RSDLP. At the Second Party Congress, Martov's proposal for the definition of party membership, which was broader and more inclusive than Lenin's, was passed. However, after several delegates walked out, Lenin's faction won a vote on the composition of the party's Central Committee, leading to the historic split between Lenin's Bolsheviks ("majority-ites") and Martov's Mensheviks ("minority-ites").

As the leader of the Mensheviks, Martov developed a distinct political philosophy. During the 1905 Russian Revolution, he argued that Russia was only ready for a "bourgeois revolution" and that socialists should remain an opposition force, not seize power. He was a leading internationalist voice during World War I, playing a key role in the Zimmerwald movement that opposed the war. After the February Revolution of 1917, he returned to Russia but refused to join the Provisional Government and condemned his fellow Mensheviks who did.

Following the October Revolution, Martov became the leader of the legal opposition to the Bolshevik government. He denounced the Red Terror, the dissolution of the Russian Constituent Assembly, and the suppression of democratic rights, while simultaneously opposing foreign intervention and the White movement during the Russian Civil War. Forced into exile in 1920, he founded the newspaper Socialist Courier (Sotsialisticheskii Vestnik) in Berlin, which remained a publication of the Mensheviks in exile for decades. Gravely ill with tuberculosis for much of his life, he died in Germany in 1923. His biographer Israel Getzler described him as "the Hamlet of Democratic Socialism" for his intellectual brilliance, political integrity, and perceived indecisiveness at crucial moments.

== Early life and revolutionary beginnings (1873–1893) ==
Yuliy Osipovich Tsederbaum was born in Constantinople on 24 November 1873 into a prosperous, assimilated Russian Jewish family. His grandfather, Alexander Tsederbaum, was a prominent figure in the Haskalah (Jewish Enlightenment), founding the first Hebrew and Yiddish newspapers in Russia. His father, Osip, was a cosmopolitan journalist, working as the Turkish correspondent for several St. Petersburg papers and as an agent for a Russian shipping company. His mother was Viennese by birth, and Martov grew up in a multilingual household. The family moved to Odessa in 1878 when Martov was four. There, he experienced the traumatic pogrom of 1881. The event, along with the official antisemitism of the Tsarist regime, instilled in him a deep alienation from the existing political order. A limp from a childhood fractured leg and his large family's frequent moves contributed to a sense of isolation and injustice, which he countered by creating an idealized imaginary world called "Prilichensk" ("The Realm of Decency") with his siblings, a world governed by strict moral laws. His sister and fellow revolutionary, Lydia Dan, recalled that this early sense of moral rectitude shaped his political life.

Martov's family moved to Saint Petersburg in 1881. In school, he faced both official and social antisemitism, which he and a Jewish friend resisted with "biting witticism and epigrams". He became a voracious reader, absorbing Russian classics and the oppositional writings of Vissarion Belinsky and Alexander Herzen. In his mid-teens, he was introduced to the revolutionary underground through his father's liberal friends and stories of the Narodovol'tsy (People's Will) terrorists. His family's near-expulsion from the capital in 1889 under the laws restricting Jewish residence left a lasting impression on him.

In his final years at the gymnasium, Martov formed a democratic circle of like-minded students, where he was introduced to the works of Karl Marx and Friedrich Engels, including The Communist Manifesto. He described the Manifesto as having "dazzled me with its picture of a mighty revolutionary party which ... would proceed to destroy the old world". In 1891, he was admitted to the Saint Petersburg Imperial University, having secured an exemption from the numerus clausus for Jews through his grandfather's connections. He quickly abandoned his natural science studies for the "fighting companionship" of radical student politics. He became a follower of the Narodovol'tsy and developed a "primitive Blanquist conception of the tasks of revolution".

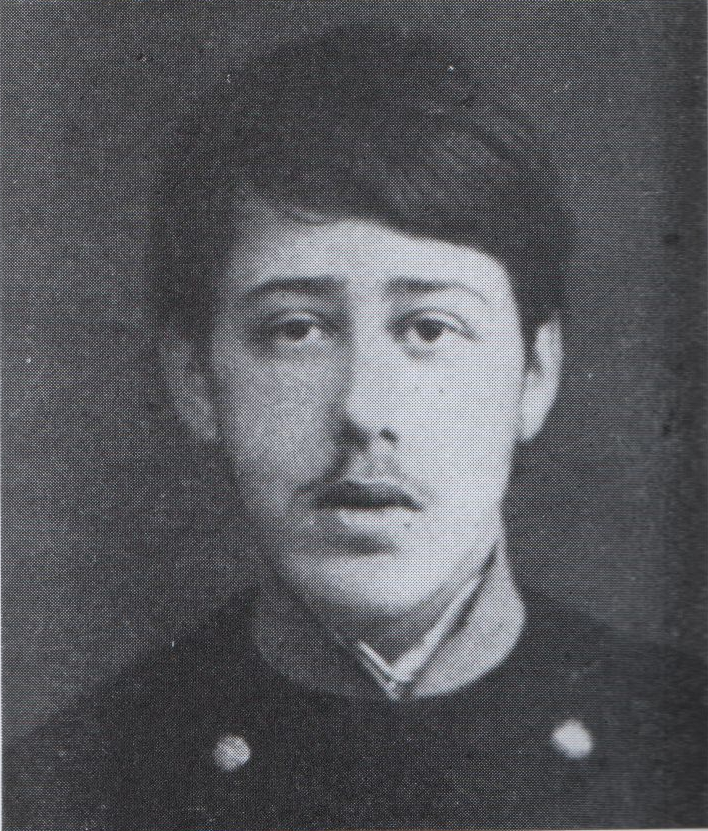
Martov after his arrest in 1892

In early 1892, he was arrested for distributing revolutionary literature. He recalled feeling an "aesthetic satisfaction" at being arrested by the gendarmes, seeing it as a romantic initiation into revolutionary adulthood. During his interrogation, he refused to inform on his comrades and was imprisoned for several months. While in prison and awaiting his sentence, he studied the works of Marx and Georgy Plekhanov. This, combined with disillusionment after witnessing peasants riot against doctors during a cholera epidemic in the wake of the 1891 famine, led him to become a committed Marxist. In his first political work, a preface to a translation of Jules Guesde's Collectivism (January 1893), Martov outlined the historical trajectory of the Russian revolutionary movement from Populism to Marxist social democracy.

== Vilno and St. Petersburg (1893–1900) ==
Sentenced to two years of administrative exile, Martov chose to go to Vilno (now Vilnius) in May 1893, which was a centre of the Jewish labour movement. There, he joined a group of seasoned social democratic activists, including Arkadi Kremer. Initially a propagandist teaching political economy to small circles of advanced Jewish workers, Martov soon grew frustrated with the method's limited reach. Along with Kremer, he concluded that the movement needed to shift from propaganda for a few to mass agitation based on the workers' everyday economic grievances. He helped formulate this new tactical line in a May Day speech in 1895 and, most significantly, as editor of the hugely influential pamphlet On Agitation (1894), which became a "handbook of social democratic action" throughout Russia.

Martov also developed the ideological rationale for a separate Jewish social democratic party, arguing that the Jewish proletariat faced a double burden of economic exploitation and national oppression. While socialists were internationalists, he contended, they had a duty to fight for the civil rights of oppressed nations. A working class that reconciled itself to its fate as an "inferior race" would never be able to wage a successful class struggle. This required a separate Jewish workers' organization that would lead the fight for Jewish emancipation. These ideas laid the foundation for the Jewish Labour Bund, which was founded in 1897.

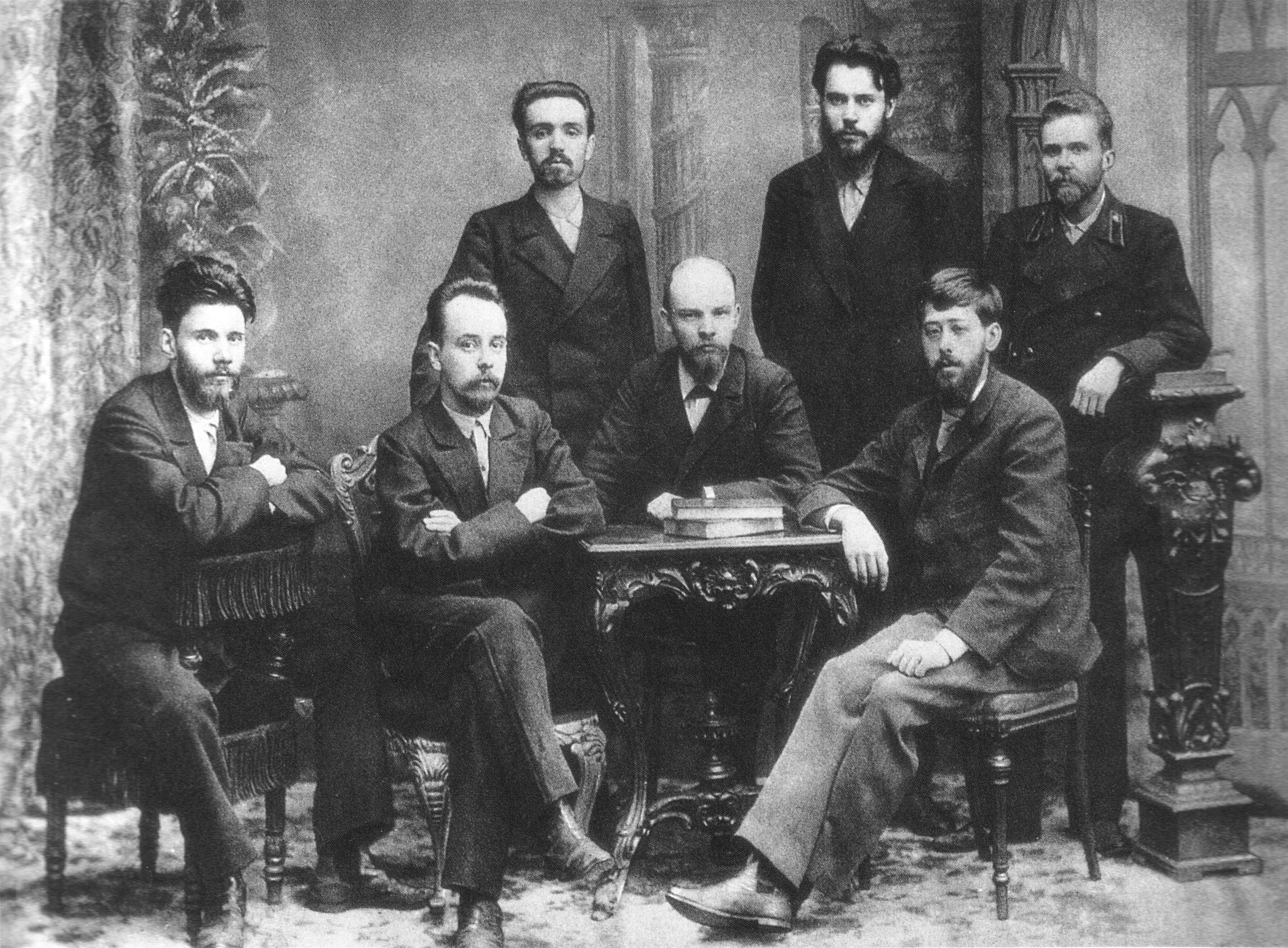
Members of the League of Struggle for the Emancipation of the Working Class, 1895. Martov is seated on the right, next to Vladimir Lenin.

In October 1895, his exile over, Martov returned to St. Petersburg. There, he and a small group of fellow intellectuals, including Vladimir Lenin, founded the League of Struggle for the Emancipation of the Working Class. The group aimed to apply the Vilno agitational method to the large industrial proletariat of the capital, producing leaflets tied to specific factory grievances and connecting them to the broader political struggle against the autocracy. In January 1896, Martov and most of the other leaders of the Union were arrested. He spent over a year in prison before being sentenced to three years of exile in the remote village of Turukhansk in Siberia, just below the Arctic Circle.

The isolation and harsh climate of Turukhansk undermined his health, and he likely contracted the throat tuberculosis that plagued him for the rest of his life. He survived through journalism, correspondence, and an intense intellectual friendship with Lenin, who was exiled further south. In his writings from exile, he continued to develop his political ideas, producing a history of the Russian labour movement, The Red Flag in Russia (1899), and a critique of the growing revisionist trend of "Economism" within the party. In 1899, Lenin proposed that they, along with Alexander Potresov, form a political triumvirate to combat revisionism and revive the party. Martov enthusiastically agreed, and upon the end of his exile in early 1900, he immediately began organising for their joint project.

== Iskra and the Second Party Congress (1900–1903) ==
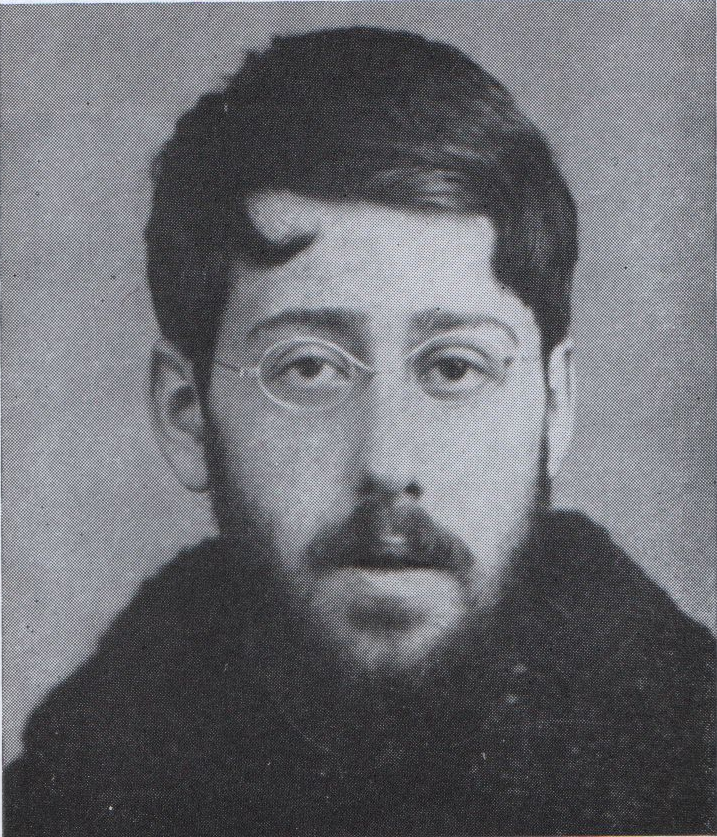
Martov after his arrest in 1896

After a tour of Russia to establish connections, including a mission to the South to line up agents for their future newspaper, Martov joined Lenin and Potresov in Munich in April 1901. Together with the "old guard" of Russian Marxism in Switzerland—Georgy Plekhanov, Pavel Axelrod, and Vera Zasulich—they launched the newspaper Iskra (The Spark). Martov became a leading journalist for the paper, writing numerous articles against Economism, Socialist-Revolutionary "adventurism", and Bundist "separatism". During the Munich period, his friendship and collaboration with Lenin were at their height. However, tensions began to surface after the editorial board moved to London in 1902. The first major crack appeared over the "Bauman affair", a case concerning the unethical conduct of a party activist. Martov, Zasulich, and Potresov demanded an investigation, while Lenin and Plekhanov dismissed it as a personal matter outside the party's competence, a stance Martov saw as a violation of party ethics. As early as 1897, Martov had sided with Lenin in debates against "worker-philism", arguing that leadership of the revolutionary movement by the intelligentsia was a "strategical formula to bring about in the most expeditious manner a direct struggle with the autocracy."

The simmering disagreements came to a head at the Second Congress of the RSDLP in Brussels and London in the summer of 1903. The conflict erupted over the wording of Paragraph 1 of the party statutes, which defined party membership. Lenin proposed a narrow definition, limiting membership to those who personally participated in a party organisation. Martov, by contrast, proposed a broader formulation, extending membership to anyone who accepted the party programme and worked "under the guidance of one of the party organizations". Martov argued that Lenin's model was overly conspiratorial and would exclude many workers and intellectuals who were sympathetic but unable to become full-time revolutionaries. He envisioned a wide party that constituted "the conscious expression of an unconscious process", a "fly-wheel bringing into movement the work of the party as a whole", while Lenin sought a disciplined, centralized organization of professional revolutionaries.

Martov's formula was passed by 28 votes to 23. However, the balance of power shifted when the seven delegates from the Bund and the Union of Russian Social Democrats Abroad walked out of the congress after their own proposals were defeated. Lenin used his new, narrow majority to push through his slate for the Central Committee and the Iskra editorial board. He proposed reducing the board from six to three—Plekhanov, Lenin, and Martov—effectively ousting the veteran Marxists Axelrod and Zasulich, as well as Potresov. Outraged by this "state of siege" and what he saw as a violation of comradely principles, Martov refused to serve on the new board and rallied the defeated minority in opposition. From this split emerged the two factions of Russian Social Democracy: Lenin's Bolsheviks (from bol'shinstvo, "majority") and Martov's Mensheviks (from men'shinstvo, "minority").

== Menshevik leader (1904–1914) ==
In the aftermath of the Second Congress, Martov and his supporters, the Mensheviks—comprising most of the gifted writers and many seasoned activists—engaged in a bitter struggle against Lenin for control of the party's institutions. Plekhanov soon broke with Lenin and used his authority to co-opt the old editors back onto the Iskra board. Martov became the paper's de facto editor, using it to denounce Lenin's "bureaucratic centralism" and what he saw as a "state of siege" within the party.

=== 1905 Revolution and aftermath ===
The outbreak of the 1905 Russian Revolution found the factions still divided. Martov, like most Mensheviks, held that Russia was only ripe for a "bourgeois revolution". He argued that the role of social democrats was to provide an "extreme revolutionary opposition" to the new bourgeois government, pushing it to the left while refraining from seizing or participating in power. He believed that taking power in a backward country would force a socialist party to act against its principles and ultimately lead to either a restoration of the old regime or a "Jacobin" dictatorship that would discredit socialism. This stood in stark contrast to the Bolshevik view, championed by Lenin, which called for a "revolutionary-democratic dictatorship of the proletariat and the peasantry".

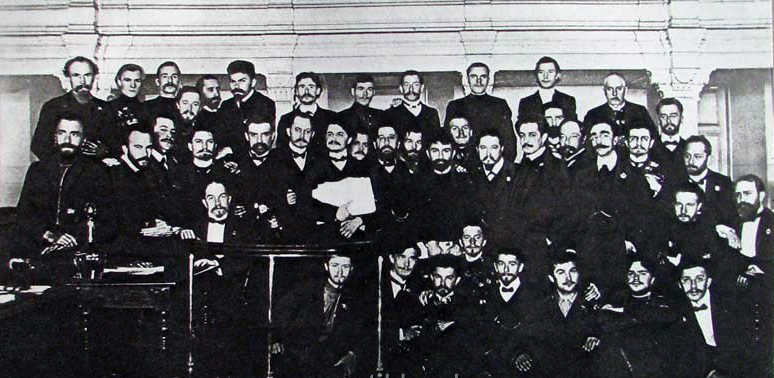
Saint Petersburg Soviet in 1905

Martov returned to Russia in October 1905, after the October Manifesto was issued. He became a leading figure in the Saint Petersburg Soviet and helped found newspapers to articulate the Menshevik position. In the latter half of 1905, he developed a broad strategy that called for the creation of a network of organs of "revolutionary self-government" throughout Russia, which would ultimately launch an assault on the central government. Unlike some of his radical Menshevik colleagues on the newspaper Nachalo, Martov remained committed to the traditional Marxist view of Russia's development and refused to sanction the idea that Russia might skip the bourgeois stage of revolution. The defeat of the December uprising and the subsequent wave of repression confirmed for Martov the correctness of his cautious approach. Arrested in February 1906, he was exiled again after several months in prison.

=== Reaction and second exile ===
From his second exile in Western Europe, Martov continued to lead the Mensheviks. The period of reaction following 1905 saw the party plagued by internal divisions. Martov fought a two-front war against the "liquidators" on the right, who wished to abandon all illegal work and focus on legal activities, and the "Otzovists" (or "recallists") on the left, who demanded the recall of social democratic deputies from the State Duma. He argued for a flexible combination of legal and illegal work, using the Duma as a platform for revolutionary propaganda while maintaining the underground party structure. He also expressed moral outrage at the Bolsheviks' "expropriations"—armed robberies to fund revolutionary activities—which he condemned as criminal acts that corrupted the party.

The Mensheviks and Bolsheviks formally reunited at the Fifth Party Congress in London in 1907, but the unity was short-lived. In 1912, Lenin organized a separate conference in Prague and established a purely Bolshevik party, formalizing the split. Martov and his fellow Mensheviks responded by organizing the "August Bloc" of non-Bolshevik social democrats. Despite his opposition to Lenin's organisational methods, Martov continued to believe that unity with the Bolsheviks was both necessary and possible, a view that often put him at odds with other Mensheviks.

== World War I and the Russian Revolution (1914–1917) ==
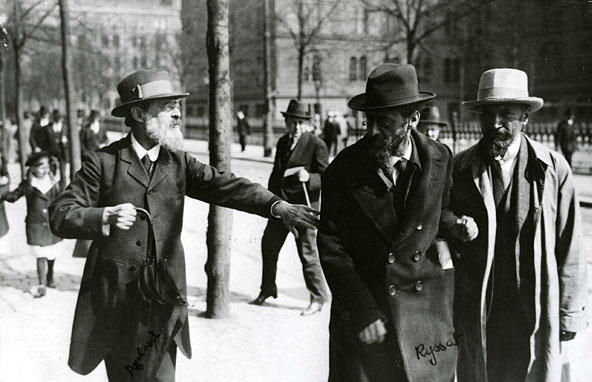
Menshevik leaders in Stockholm, May 1917. Left to right: Pavel Axelrod, Martov, and Alexander Martinov.

The outbreak of World War I in 1914 shattered the Second International and deepened the divisions within Russian social democracy. From Paris, Martov immediately adopted a staunchly internationalist position, denouncing the war as an imperialist conflict and opposing the "social-patriotism" of those socialists who supported their national governments. He became a central figure in the anti-war movement, co-editing the internationalist newspaper Golos (The Voice) with Leon Trotsky. He was a key organizer of the Zimmerwald Conference in 1915, which brought together anti-war socialists from across Europe. At Zimmerwald and later at the Kienthal Conference in 1916, Martov led the "Zimmerwald Centre", steering a middle course between the outright defensists and Lenin's radical "Zimmerwald Left", which called for turning the imperialist war into a civil war. Martov argued for a mass struggle for a "democratic peace without annexations or indemnities", believing that this was the only way to save both the revolution and the honour of international socialism.

The February Revolution of 1917 caught Martov by surprise in Switzerland. He was desperate to return to Russia but was blocked by the Allied governments. Along with other revolutionaries in exile, he arranged to travel back through Germany in a "sealed train". He arrived in Petrograd on 9 May 1917, over a month after Lenin. He found his own Menshevik party deeply divided and its official leadership, led by Irakli Tsereteli and Fyodor Dan, committed to a policy of "revolutionary defensism" and participation in a coalition government with the liberal bourgeoisie. Martov strongly condemned both policies, arguing that they tied the fate of the revolution to an imperialist war and abdicated the socialists' role as an independent voice of the working class.

As leader of the "Menshevik-Internationalist" faction, he advocated an immediate struggle for a general democratic peace and the creation of a government composed exclusively of socialist parties. Following the July Days crisis, Martov made a bold proposal for the soviets to take power and form a "government of the democracy" based on all socialist parties, but his Menshevik colleagues rejected it. For months, he remained in the minority within his own party. However, as the Provisional Government's failures mounted and the war dragged on, his position gained support. By the autumn of 1917, Martov's policy of an all-socialist government had won a majority at the Democratic Conference. But the opportunity was missed. On the eve of the October Revolution, the Menshevik and Socialist-Revolutionary leaders, over Martov's objections, agreed to a new coalition government under Alexander Kerensky, leaving the path open for the Bolsheviks.

== Opposition to the Bolsheviks (1917–1920) ==
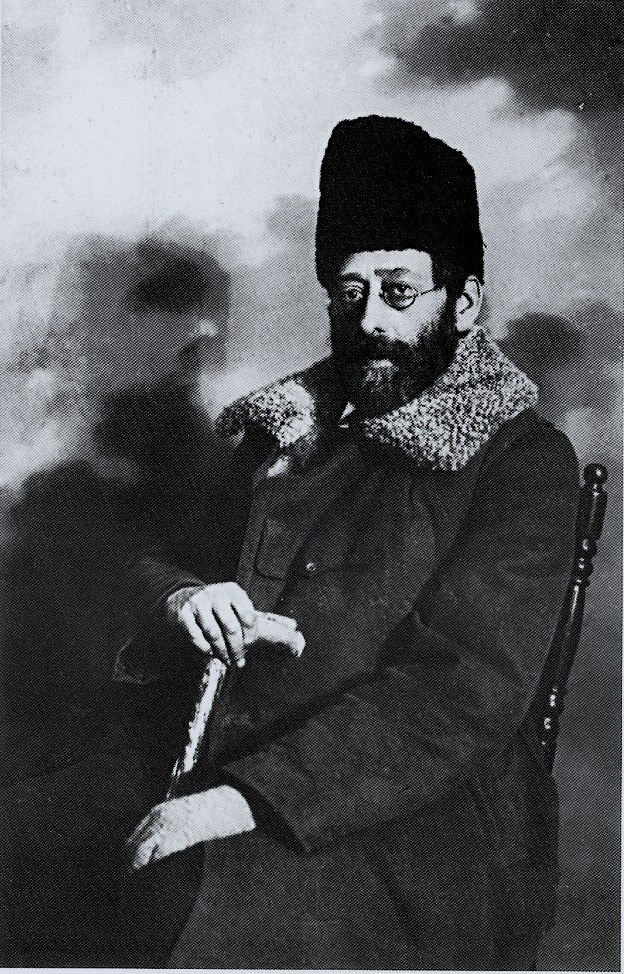
Martov in 1917

On the night of 25 October (7 November) 1917, as the Bolsheviks seized power, Martov addressed the Second All-Russian Congress of Soviets. He appealed for the formation of a united democratic government based on all the Soviet parties to avert civil war. His proposal was met with "roaring applause", but the majority of Mensheviks and Socialist-Revolutionaries, in protest at the Bolshevik coup, walked out of the congress. Trotsky famously consigned Martov and his allies to the "dustbin of history". A disillusioned Martov declared, "One day you will understand the crime in which you are taking part," and walked out as well.

Despite his opposition to the coup, Martov believed that an armed struggle against the Bolsheviks would only unleash a bloody counter-revolution. For a brief period, he took a leading role in the Vikzhel negotiations for the formation of an all-socialist coalition government, but the talks collapsed due to the intransigence of both Lenin and the anti-Bolshevik right. From that point on, Martov led the Menshevik party as a legal opposition to the Bolshevik regime. In the All-Russian Central Executive Committee (VTsIK), the Soviet "parliament", he became the most prominent and courageous critic of the government, denouncing the Red Terror, the suppression of newspapers, the dissolution of the Russian Constituent Assembly, the Treaty of Brest-Litovsk, and the persecution of political opponents. He was particularly scathing about the revival of the death penalty, the show trial of Admiral Aleksei Shchastny, and the summary executions carried out by the Cheka.

In June 1918, the Mensheviks were expelled from the VTsIK and their newspapers were closed down. During the Russian Civil War, Martov's Mensheviks adopted a policy of standing "not by the enemies of the revolution, but by the revolution itself", meaning they would support the Soviet state militarily against the White movement while maintaining political opposition to the Bolshevik regime. This complex stance won them few friends. After the defeat of the Whites, the Bolsheviks renewed their persecution of the Mensheviks. By 1920, the party was largely operating in a semi-legal state, its leaders and activists subject to constant harassment and arrest.

== Final exile and death (1920–1923) ==
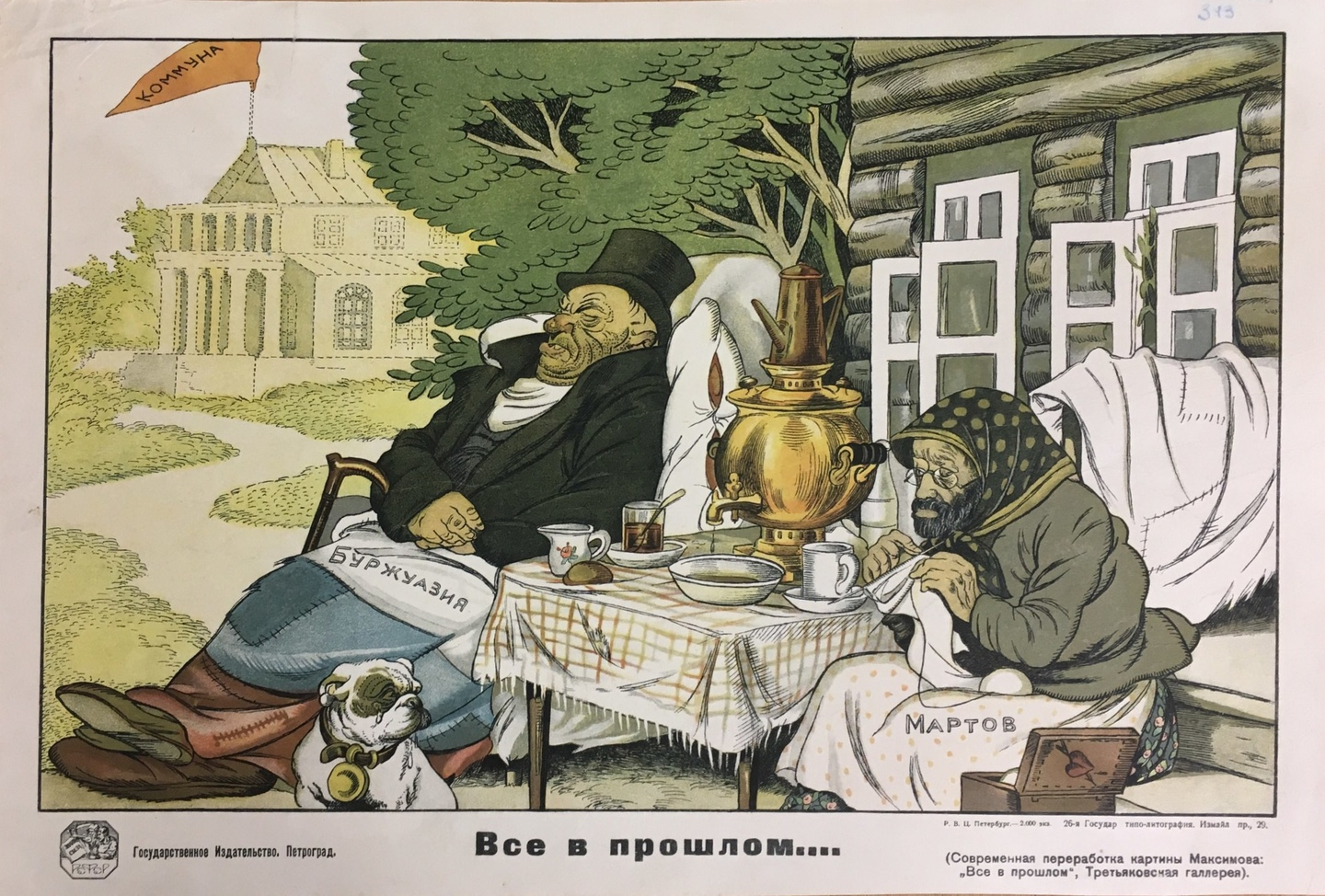
All in the Past (1921), a Bolshevik cartoon by Viktor Deni. Martov (right) is depicted in exile knitting socks and cohabiting with the decrepit émigré bourgeoisie. Parody on the famous Maximov's painting.

In September 1920, with his health failing, Martov was granted permission to leave Soviet Russia legally to attend the congress of the Independent Social Democratic Party of Germany (USPD) in Halle. At Halle, he delivered a powerful address urging the USPD not to join the Communist International, which he denounced as a tool of the Russian state designed to impose Bolshevik methods on the European socialist movement. His efforts were unsuccessful, and the USPD split.

Martov settled in Berlin, which became the new centre of the Menshevik Party in exile. In February 1921, he launched the newspaper Socialist Courier (Sotsialisticheskii Vestnik), which he edited until his death. The paper became the main voice of Menshevism for the next four decades. He also became a leading figure in the International Working Union of Socialist Parties (the "Vienna" or "Two-and-a-Half International"), an alliance of centrist socialist parties that sought a middle path between the reformism of the Second International and the authoritarianism of the Comintern. His final years were marked by a painful political break with his oldest comrade, Pavel Axelrod. Martov argued that in the face of counter-revolution, socialists had to support the Soviet regime as the "lesser evil", whereas Axelrod insisted that the Bolshevik dictatorship was a total negation of democratic socialism that could not be compromised with.

In his final writings, collected in works like World Bolshevism (1923), Martov offered a detailed critique of the Soviet state. Historian Leszek Kołakowski identifies Martov, alongside Karl Kautsky and Rosa Luxemburg, as the "third eminent critic of Bolshevik ideology and tactics in the years immediately after the Revolution". Kołakowski emphasizes Martov's conviction that the Bolshevik system was based on the principle that "socialism is true and must therefore be imposed on the masses, who, deluded by the bourgeoisie, cannot understand their own interests". For Martov, working-class rule meant the rule of the class itself, not a "bourgeois ideology" produced by a party that claimed to represent it.

Martov argued that the Bolsheviks' victory was not a triumph of Marxist theory but a consequence of the war's devastation, which led to the "disintegration" of the working class and its replacement by "rural elements" who were not truly proletarian. He characterized the Bolshevik regime as a form of "anarcho-Jacobinism", in contrast to orthodox Marxism, and argued that Lenin's The State and Revolution was a utopian fantasy rather than a practical guide. Martov believed in the importance of "cultural continuity" and contended that the working class must develop its own political consciousness before it could successfully take power; a "dictatorship of a minority", he insisted, could only lead to a restoration of the old order. Martov also analyzed the New Economic Policy (NEP) in Russia. He argued that it represented a retreat from the "Utopian" attempt to impose socialism by force and created a new historical situation. He concluded that Russia was undergoing a "Bonapartist perversion of the revolution", with a Red dictatorship resting on a quasi-capitalist economic base. He feared this would lead to a counter-revolutionary restoration from within the Bolshevik apparatus itself. The only alternative, he argued, was a full democratic liquidation of the Bolshevik regime and the establishment of a constitutional republic.

Martov, who had been mortally ill for years, died of tuberculosis on 4 April 1923 in a sanatorium in Schömberg, Germany, at the age of 49.

== Legacy ==
Martov's political failure has been attributed by many, including his rival Trotsky, to a "Hamlet"-like indecisiveness and an overly intellectual approach to politics. His biographer Israel Getzler argues that while Martov was a brilliant theorist and a man of great moral integrity, he was also a reluctant leader who "lacked the mainspring of will". Martov's political choices were guided by a consistent set of principles derived from his orthodox Marxism, which he applied even when they were politically disadvantageous. He remained committed to the ideas that Russia must pass through a bourgeois-democratic stage before it could achieve socialism, and that the party's task was to create an independent, politically conscious working class. A third key tenet of his political outlook was a deep concern for the moral dimension of politics; he rejected the idea that the socialist cause justified any action, insisting on a universal code of ethical conduct. This often left him struggling to reconcile the conflicting demands of being a class-party leader, a democratic revolutionary, and a socialist internationalist in the complex conditions of early 20th-century Russia. Getzler concludes that Martov, as a member of the richly endowed but alienated Russian-Jewish intelligentsia, embodied the tragedy of a "Prometheus bound", a revolutionary destroyed by the very revolution he helped to create.

== Works ==
- Rabochee delo v Rossii [The Workers' Movement in Russia]. Geneva, 1899.
- Povorotnyi punkt v istorii evreiskogo rabochego dvizheniia [Turning Point in the History of the Jewish Labor Movement]. Geneva, 1900.
- Militarizm i rabochii klass [Militarism and the Working Class]. Geneva, 1903.
- Eshche raz v men'shinstve: Rossiiskaia sotsial-demokraticheskaia rabochaia partiia vstupila v novuiu eru [In the Minority Once Again: The Russian Social Democratic Labor Party Has Entered a New Era. Geneva, 1903. (Mimeographed).
- "Short Constitution of the All-Russian Social Democratic Workers' and Soldiers' Deputies." First published in Iskra, No 58, 25 January 1904.
- Bor'ba s «osadnym polozheniem» v Rossiiskoi sotsial-demokraticheskoi rabochei partii: otvet na pis'mo N. Lenina [The Struggle against the "State of Siege" in the Russian Social Democratic Labor Party: Reply to the Letter of N. Lenin]. Geneva, 1904.
- Vpered ili nazad? [Forward or Backwards?]. Geneva, 1904.
- Ob odnom «nedostoinom» postupke: otvet Leninu, Liadovu i Ko.[On a Certain "Unworthy" Act: A Reply to Lenin, Liadov, and Co.]. Geneva, 1904.
- Krasnoye znamia v Rossii: ocherk istorii russkogo rabochego dvizheniia [The Red Banner in Russia: An Outline History of the Russian Workers' Movement]. Geneva?, 1904.
- Samoderzhavie na skam'e podsudimykh [Autocracy in the Dock]. Geneva?, 1904.
- Prostye rechi o vnutrennikh vragakh [Plain Talk About Internal Enemies]. Geneva, 1905.
- Politicheskiia partii v Rossii [Political Parties in Russia], 1906.
- Podarok russkim krest'ianam i rabochim [Gift to Russian Peasants and Workers]. St. Petersburg, Oct. 1906.
- Izbiratel'niia soglasheniia [Electoral agreements]. 1907.
- "The Lesson of the Events in Russia." First published in Le Socialisme, December 29, 1907.
- Obshchestvennoe dvizhenie v rossii v nachale XX-go veka [The Social Movement in Russia at the Beginning of the 20th Century] (co-editor) 4 vols., 1909–14.
  - Volume 1 | Volume 2 | Volume 3 | Volume 4
- Spasiteli ili uprazdniteli? : kto i kak razrushal RS-DRP? [Saviors or Destroyers? Who Destroyed the RSDLP and How]. Paris, 1911.
- Klass protiv klassa [Class Against Class]. New York, 1914.
- "Resolution to the Second All-Russia Congress of Soviets Workers' and Soldiers' Deputies." First published in Novaya Zhizn, No. 163, October 26 (November 8), 1917, p. 3.
- Protiv voini! Sbornik statei (1914–1916) [Against War! Collection of Articles, 1914–1916]. Moscow, 1917.
- "Down with the Death Penalty!" June/July 1918. First published in Iu.O. Martov Izbrannoe, Moscow, 2000, pp. 373–383.
- Proletariat i natsional'naia oborona [The Proletariat and National Defense]. 1918.
- Istoriia rossiiskoi sotsial-demokratii: Perod 1898–1907 g. [History of Russian Social Democracy: The 1898–1907 Period]. 1919, reissued 1923.
- Chto delat'? [What is to be done?]. July 1919.
- "Decomposition or Conquest of the State," 1919. First published in Mirovoi Bolshevism, Berlin, 1923.
- "The Ideology of 'Sovietism'." First published in Mysl, Kharkov 1919. Originally published in English in International Review, New York 1938.
- "The Roots of World Bolshevism." Russia, 1919.
- "The World's Social Revolution and the Aims of Social Democracy." British Labour Delegation to Russia, 1920: Report, July 1920.
- "A contradiction." British Labour Delegation to Russia, 1920: Report, July 1920.
- Lenin protiv kommunizma [Lenin Against Communism]. 1921.
- Razvitie krupnoi promyshlennosti i rabochee dvizhenie v Rossii [The Development of Heavy Industry and the Workers' Movement in Russia]. 1923.
- Zapiski sotsialdemokrata [Notes of a Social Democrat]. 1923.
- Obschestvennye i umstvennye techeniia v Rossii 1870–1905 g.g. [Social and Intellectual Trends in Russia, 1870–1905]. Moscow/Leningrad, 1924.
- The State and the Socialist Revolution. (Herman Jerson, trans.) New York, 1938.

== See also ==
- Bibliography of the Russian Revolution and Civil War
- Outline of the Russian Revolution and Civil War
- Index of articles related to the Russian Revolution and Civil War
- Vikzhel negotiations
