= Revolutionary Sotsial-Demokrat Organisation =

The Revolutionary Sotsial-Demokrat Organisation was an organisation of Russian socialists, formed by the members of the Emancipation of Labour group and their supporters in May 1900, following the split of the Union of Russian Social-Democrats Abroad at its Second Congress. In October 1901, on the proposal of Vladimir Lenin, the revolutionary Sotsial-Demokrat organisation united with the Iskra organisation abroad into the League of Russian Revolutionary Social-Democracy Abroad.
