= Rabocheye Delo =

Former Russian political newspaper

- "Пролетаріи всѣхъ странъ, соединяйтесь!" ("Proletarians of all countries, unite!")
- Cover of the first issue of Rabocheye Delo
- Staff writers: Boris Naumovich Krichevsky; Pavel F. Teplov; Vladimir Pavlovich Ivanshin; Aleksandr S. Martynov (from 1900)
- Founded: 1899
- Ceased publication: 1902
- Political alignment: Union of Russian Social Democrats Abroad; Russian Social Democratic Labour Party
- Language: Russian
- Country: Russian Empire

Rabocheye Delo (Russian: Рабочее дело, The Workers' Cause) was a non-periodical political newspaper and an organ of the Union of Russian Social Democrats Abroad. It ran from April 1899 to February 1902. The printing house was in Geneva and the editorial office was in Paris. Its editors were Boris Krichevsky, Pavel Teplov, Vladimir Ivanshin and, from 1900, Aleksandr S. Martynov. A total of 12 issues were published in nine volumes. The editorial board of Rabocheye Delo was the center of the Economists.

The political trend of Rabocheye Delo was indicated in its first issue: the struggle for the economic interests of the proletariat was proclaimed the basis of all social-democratic activity, while the political tasks were presented as a matter of a distant future. Lenin in his book What Is To Be Done? characterised the position of Rabocheye Delo in the following way:

...Rabocheye Delo acquired a special significance, a "historical" significance, if you will, because it expressed fully and strikingly, not consistent Economism, but the confusion and vacillation which constitute the distinguishing feature of an entire period in the history of Russian Social-Democracy.

— Vladimir Lenin

At the Second Congress of the Russian Social Democratic Labour Party (RSDLP), Rabocheye Delo represented the extreme right wing of the party.

== Precedents ==
Rabocheye Delo was originally founded by the League of Struggle for the Emancipation of the Working Class, in late 1895. Its first issue was ready to go to press when it was seized by gendarmes during a raid on Anatoly Vaneyev's house. Although 6 League members, including Lenin, were arrested, work continued on the League.

In the second half of 1898, however, the League and Rabocheye Delo fell under control of the Economists through their paper, Rabochaya Mysl (Russian: Рабочая Mысль, Workers' Thought).

== Supplement ==
Rabocheye Delo had a supplement called Listok "Rabochego Dela" (Russian: Листок "Рабочего Дела", "Rabocheye Delo"'s Paper) that ran for eight issues, from June 1900 to July 1901. It was edited in Geneva.
