= Union of Russian Social Democrats Abroad =

Defunct organization of Russian socialists

Union of Russian Social-Democrats Abroad was an organization of emigrant Russian socialists, set up in Geneva in 1894 on the initiative of the Emancipation of Labour group. It had its own printing press for issuing revolutionary literature, and published the newspapers Rabotnik ("The Worker") and Listok Rabotnika ("The Worker's Paper"). Initially, the Emancipation of Labour group directed the Union and edited its publications. But afterwards opportunist elements ('the young' or Economists) gained the upper hand within the Union.

In the spring of 1898, the first congress of the Russian Social Democratic Labour Party recognised the Union as the party representative abroad.

At the first congress of the Union in November 1898, the Emancipation of Labour group announced that it would no longer edit the publications of the Union. The final break and the withdrawal of the group from the Union took place at the second congress of the Union in April 1900; the Emancipation of Labour group and its followers walked out of the congress and set up an independent organisation, Sotsial-Demokrat.

From April 1899 to February 1902 the Union published Rabocheye Delo ("The Workers' Cause") in Geneva. It was edited by Boris N. Krichevsky, Aleksandr S. Martynov, Pavel F. Teplov and Vladimir P. Ivanshin.

In September 1900, the 5th International Socialist Congress of the Second International, held in Paris, set up the International Socialist Bureau, the permanent organisation of the International, with representatives of all socialist parties adhered to it. Each country was to send one to three representatives to each plenary meeting, held every year. Russia initially sent Georgi Plekhanov, of Emancipation of Labour, and Boris Krichevsky, editor of Rabocheye Delo, both of whom were in opposing sides of the conflict within the Union. Krichevsky remained a member of the Bureau from its formation until the 2nd meeting, in December 1902. Plekhanov was a delegate various times between the foundation and 1912.
