= Tampere Workers' Hall =

Conference centre in Tampere, Finland

- Tampereen työväentalo Tammerfors folkets hus
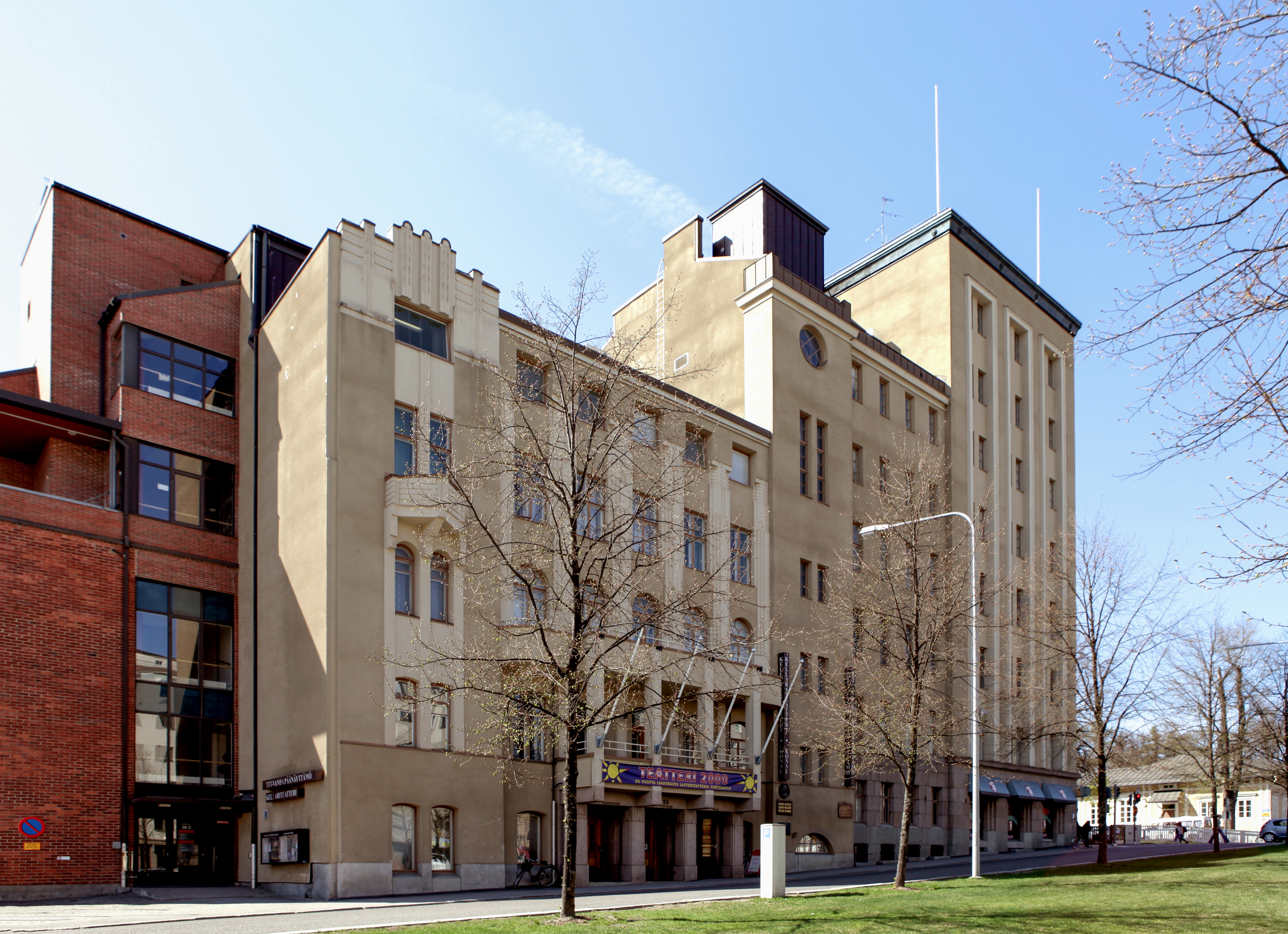
- Interactive map of the Tampere Workers' Hall area

General information
- Location: Hämeenpuisto 28, Tampere
- Coordinates: 61°29′45″N 023°45′06″E
- Current tenants: Social Democratic Party of Finland, University of Tampere, Tampere Lenin Museum
- Completed: 1900
- Landlord: Tampere Workers' Society

Design and construction
- Architects: Heikki Tiitola, Heikki Kaartinen, Bertel Strömmer

Tampere Workers' Hall (also known as the Puistotorni, The Park Tower) is a conference and congress centre in Kaakinmaa, Tampere, Finland, located in the corner between Hämeenpuisto and Hallituskatu. It was built in 1900 by the Tampere Workers' Society as a People's House for the local working-class. The building has been expanded twice, in 1912 after the design of the architect Heikki Kaartinen and in 1930 by the architect Bertel Strömmer. Today the Workers' Hall include conference rooms, a restaurant as well as premises of the Social Democratic Party, University of Tampere and the Tampere Lenin Museum. The 1901 established Tampere Workers' Theatre was housed in the Workers' Hall until 1985 when the new theatre building was raised to the next plot.

In December 1905 Tampere Workers' Hall hosted the exile conference of the Russian Social Democratic Labour Party. It was an unofficial meeting held between the 3rd and 4th Party Congresses in London and Stockholm. Tampere Conference was the first time when Lenin and Stalin met in person.
