= Vilna (disambiguation) =

Vilna may refer to:

== Places ==
- Vilnius, capital of Lithuania (Vilna in several languages)
- Vilnia River, a river in Lithuania
- Vilna Governorate, a governorate (guberniya) of the Russian Empire
- Vilna, Alberta, a village in Canada

== Other uses ==
- Vilna Gaon, rabbi, Talmud scholar, and Kabbalist
- Vilna Troupe, a Yiddish theatrical company
- Vilna Group, a circle of Jewish Social-Democrats founded in the mid-1890s
- Vilna Edition Shas, the most common printed edition of the Talmud still in use today

== See also ==
- Wilno (disambiguation)
- Wilna (disambiguation)
- Vilnia
