= Central Committee of the 2nd Congress of the Russian Social Democratic Labour Party =

The Central Committee of the 2nd Congress of the Russian Social Democratic Labour Party was in session from 1903 to 1905.

== Plenums ==
The Central Committee was not a permanent institution. It convened plenary sessions and meetings. Four meetings were held between the 2nd Congress and the 3rd Congress.

Meetings of the Central Committee
| Plenum | Date | Length |
|---|---|---|
| 1st Meeting | 9–11 December 1903 | 3 days |
| 2nd Meeting | 25, 27 November 1903 | 2 days |
| 3rd Meeting | 20 February 1905 | 1 day |
| 4th Meeting | 22 February 1905 | 1 day |

== Composition ==
Members of the Central Committee of the 2nd Congress of the Russian Social Democratic Labour Party
| Name | Cyrillic | 1st CC | 3rd CC | Birth | Death | PM | Nationality | Gender | Portrait |
|---|---|---|---|---|---|---|---|---|---|
| Yekaterina Alexandrova | Екатерина Александрова | Add-on | Arrested | 1864 | 1943 | ? | Russian | Female | |
| Iosif Dubrovinsky | Иосиф Дубровинский | Add-on | Arrested | 1877 | 1913 | 1898 | Russian | Male | |
| Maria Essen | Мария Э́ссен | Add-on | Arrested | 1872 | 1956 | 1898 | Russian | Female | — |
| Lev Galperin | Лев Гальперин | Add-on | Arrested | 1872 | 1951 | 1898 | Belarusian | Male | — |
| Fyodor Gusarov | Фёдор Гусаров | Add-on | Resigned | 1875 | 1920 | ? | Russian | Male | — |
| Lev Karpov | Лев Ка́рпов | Add-on | Arrested | 1879 | 1921 | 1898 | Russian | Male | |
| Leonid Krasin | Леонид Красин | Add-on | Reelected | 1873 | 1926 | 1896 | Russian | Male | |
| Viktor Krokhmal | Виктор Крохмаль | Add-on | Arrested | 1873 | 1933 | ? | Ukrainian | Male | |
| Gleb Krzhizhanovsky | Глеб Кржижано́вский | New | Resigned | 1872 | 1959 | 1898 | Pole | Male | |
| Aleksandr Kvyatkovsky | Александр Квятковский | Add-on | Arrested | 1878 | 1926 | ? | Russian | Male | — |
| Friedrich Lengnik | Фридрих Ленгник | New | Arrested | 1873 | 1936 | 1898 | Latvian | Male | |
| Vladimir Lenin | Владимир Ленин | Add-on | Reelected | 1870 | 1924 | 1898 | Russian | Male | |
| Alexei Lyubimov | Алексей Любимов | Add-on | Not | 1879 | 1919 | 1898 | Russian | Male | — |
| Vladimir Noskov | Владимир Носков | New | Arrested | 1878 | 1913 | 1898 | Russian | Male | |
| Vladimir Rozanov | Владимир Розанов | Add-on | Arrested | 1876 | 1939 | ? | Russian | Male | |
| Mikhail Silvin | Михаил Сильвин | Add-on | Arrested | 1874 | 1955 | 1898 | Russian | Male | — |
| Rosalia Zemlyachka | Розалия Землячка | Add-on | Resigned | 1876 | 1947 | 1898 | Ukrainian Jew | Female | |
