= Wilna (disambiguation) =

Wilna is a historical spelling of the name of the city of Vilnius.

Wilna may also refer to:

- Wilna, New York, a town in Jefferson County, New York, United States
- Wilna Hervey (1894 – 1979), an American silent film actress and artist
- Wilna Adriaanse (born 1958), South African Afrikaans romantic fiction writer

== See also ==
- Wilno (disambiguation)
- Vilna (disambiguation)
