= Central Committee of the 3rd Congress of the Russian Social Democratic Labour Party =

The Central Committee of the 3rd Congress of the Russian Social Democratic Labour Party was in session from April to December 1905.

== Plenums ==
The Central Committee was not a permanent institution. It convened plenary sessions and meetings. Three meetings were held between the 2nd Congress and the 1st Conference. When the CC was not in session, decision-making power was vested in the internal bodies of the CC itself; that is, the Politburo, Secretariat and Orgburo. None of these bodies were permanent either; typically they convened several times a month.

Meetings of the Central Committee
| Plenum | Date | Length |
|---|---|---|
| 1st Meeting | 10 May 1905 | 1 day |
| 2nd Meeting | 10 August 1905 | 1 day |
| 3rd Meeting | November 1905 | Unknown |

== Composition ==
=== Members ===
Members of the Central Committee of the 3rd Congress of the Russian Social Democratic Labour Party
| Name | Cyrillic | 2nd Cong. | 1st Conf. | Birth | Death | PM | Nationality | Gender | Portrait |
|---|---|---|---|---|---|---|---|---|---|
| Alexander Bogdanov | Алекса́ндр Богда́нов | New | Not | 1873 | 1928 | 1906 | Russian | Male | |
| Leonid Krasin | Леонид Красин | Old | Reelected | 1873 | 1926 | 1896 | Russian | Male | |
| Vladimir Lenin | Владимир Ленин | Old | Not | 1870 | 1924 | 1898 | Russian | Male | |
| Dmitry Postolovsky | Дмитрий Постоловский | New | Not | 1876 | 1948 | 1903 | Russian | Male | — |
| Alexei Rykov | Алексей Рыков | New | Reelected | 1881 | 1938 | 1899 | Russian | Male | |

=== Candidates ===
Candidate Members of the Central Committee of the 3rd Congress of the Russian Social Democratic Labour Party
| Name | Cyrillic | 2nd Cong. | 1st Conf. | Birth | Death | PM | Ethnicity | Gender | Portrait |
|---|---|---|---|---|---|---|---|---|---|
| Maria Essen | Мария Э́ссен | Member | Not | 1872 | 1956 | 1898 | Russian | Female | — |
| Sergey Gusev | Сергей Гусев | New | Not | 1874 | 1933 | 1898 | Russian | Male | |
| Pyotr Rumyantsev | Пётр Румянцев | New | Member | 1870 | 1925 | 1896 | Russian | Male | — |
| Ivan Summer | Иван Саммер | New | Member | 1870 | 1921 | 1898 | Ukrainian | Male | — |
