= Nikolai Rozhkov =

Russian revolutionary and historian

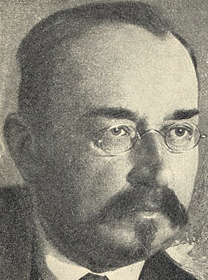
Nikolai Rozhkov

Nikolai Aleksanderovich Rozhkov (Russian: Николай Александрович Рожков; November 5, 1868, Verkhoturye, Perm Governorate – February 2, 1927, Moscow) was a Russian historian who became an active revolutionary in the Russian Social Democratic Labour Party.

In 1905 Rozhkov joined the Bolshevik faction of the R.S.D.L.P. At the 5th Congress of the Russian Social Democratic Labour Party he was elected as a full member of the Central Committee. However, by 1907 he had fallen out with Lenin who maintained for him an enduring hatred.

== Early life and career ==
Rozhkov was born in to the family of a nobleman and teacher. He graduated from the Faculty of History and Philology of the Imperial Moscow University and at the same time was involved in student activism. In 1896 he passed his master's exam and defended his master's thesis to his scientific advisor Vasily Klyuchevsky. According to Rozhkov himself, it was his extensive research during the writing of his dissertation that made him a "de-facto Marxist". Rozhkov became an author of many scientific and historical books texts, his writings were published in various prominent scientific magazines, such as Mir Bozhiy, Obrazovanye and Zhizn.

During the same period he started his collaboration with the RSDLP and was an editor of the Pravda magazine (later Pravda newspaper) alongside Anatoly Lunacharsky and Alexander Bogdanov. He was also associated with the Literary and Lecturer Group of the RSDLP and contributed to its newspaper Borba.

Eventually in 1905, Rozhkov joined the Bolshevik faction of the Russian Social Democratic Labour Party. Shortly after he was in conflict with Vladimir Lenin and his views on the Bolsheviks' agricultural policies and criticised him at the 4th Congress of the RSDLP. After the failed Bolshevik Uprising in 1905, Rozhkov was in an illegal position and was arrested and exiled to Siberia after he was elected to the Central Committee of the RSDLP at the 5h Congress of the RSDLP.

== Rozhkov's struggle for a legal party ==
In February 1911 he submitted an article entitled "An Essential Initiative" to the legal Bolshevik paper Zvezda. Here he argued three points:

1. The aristocracy no longer had a monopoly of power but were facing a losing struggle against the rising bourgeoisie
2. The bourgeois were stabilising their power even though such parties such as the Kadets, Trudoviks, Octoberists, Renovationists were still illegal.
3. That the socio-economic development of Russia was comparable to that of Prussia in the 1880s, and that there was not a general sentiment in favour of revolution in Russia, although there was much unrealistic support amongst those in exile.

Zinoviev responded to the article with a somewhat stern but friendly letter which reproved Rozhkov for his position, which he saw as comparable to the liquidationists. Rozhkov refused to give up his ideas, and wrote a second article "A System of Operation" in which he had advocated the establishment of an organisation called "The Political Society for the Protection of the Interests of the Working Class". He hoped this organisation would spread through workers organisations such as co-operatives and trade unions, eventually to establish itself as a political party in the Duma. In a third article, "The Struggle for Legality". These three articles eventually drew a response from Lenin in which the later declared that Rozhkov as a legalist was no different from a liquidationist. But Rozhkov was not scared of being called by such a name. Rozhkov then wrote "The Contemporary Situation in Russia and the Fundamental Task of the Working Class Movement in the Present Moment". In the end the Bolsheviks refused to publish his articles, and this last article appeared in Nasha Zarya. Whereas previously the argument between Lenin and Rozhkov had been through private letters. However Lenin now responded with "A Liberal Labour Party Manifesto" published in Zvezda No. 32, December 3, 1911.

== After 1917 ==
After the February Revolution, Rozhkov was associated with the Mensheviks and became Deputy Minister of Post and Telegraph (May–July 1917) of the Provisional Government. He proposed to the Mensheviks and Socialist-Revolutionaries to create a "purely socialist state".

After the Bolshevik Seizure of power Rozhkov became an opponent of the Soviet government and criticised the Bolsheviks for the closing down of the Constituent Assembly in the magazine Novaya Zhizn and later on for the policy of war communism in a personal letter to Lenin. Rozhkov was also one of the earliest supporters of the New Economic Policy. He continued his criticism of the new regime and was eventually arrested by the Cheka in 1921 and was held in custody at the Peter and Paul Fortress. He was then released but re-arrested in 1922. The Central Committee of the Russian Communist Party (b) decided that Rozhkov should be exiled. However, after Rozhkov stated that he was willing to leave the Menshevik Party and cooperate with the Soviet government the decision was turned.

Upon his return to Moscow Rozhkov became involved in academic work and became lecturer at the Communist Academy, the Institute of Red Professors and the Moscow State University. In 1926 he was appointed director of the State Historical Museum in Moscow.

Nikolai Rozhkov died on February 22, 1927, aged fifty nine.
