= 3rd Central Committee =

3rd Central Committee may refer to:

- Central Committee of the 3rd Congress of the Russian Social Democratic Labour Party, 1905–1906
- 3rd Central Executive Committee of the Chinese Communist Party, 1923–1925
- 3rd Central Committee of the Communist Party of Cuba, 1986–1991
- 3rd Central Committee of the Lao People's Revolutionary Party, 1982–1986
- 3rd Central Committee of the Workers' Party of Vietnam, 1960–1976
- Central Committee of the 3rd Congress of the Communist Party of Yugoslavia, 1926–1928
- 3rd Central Committee of the Workers' Party of Korea, 1956–1961
