= Tampere Lenin Museum =

Museum in Tampere, Finland

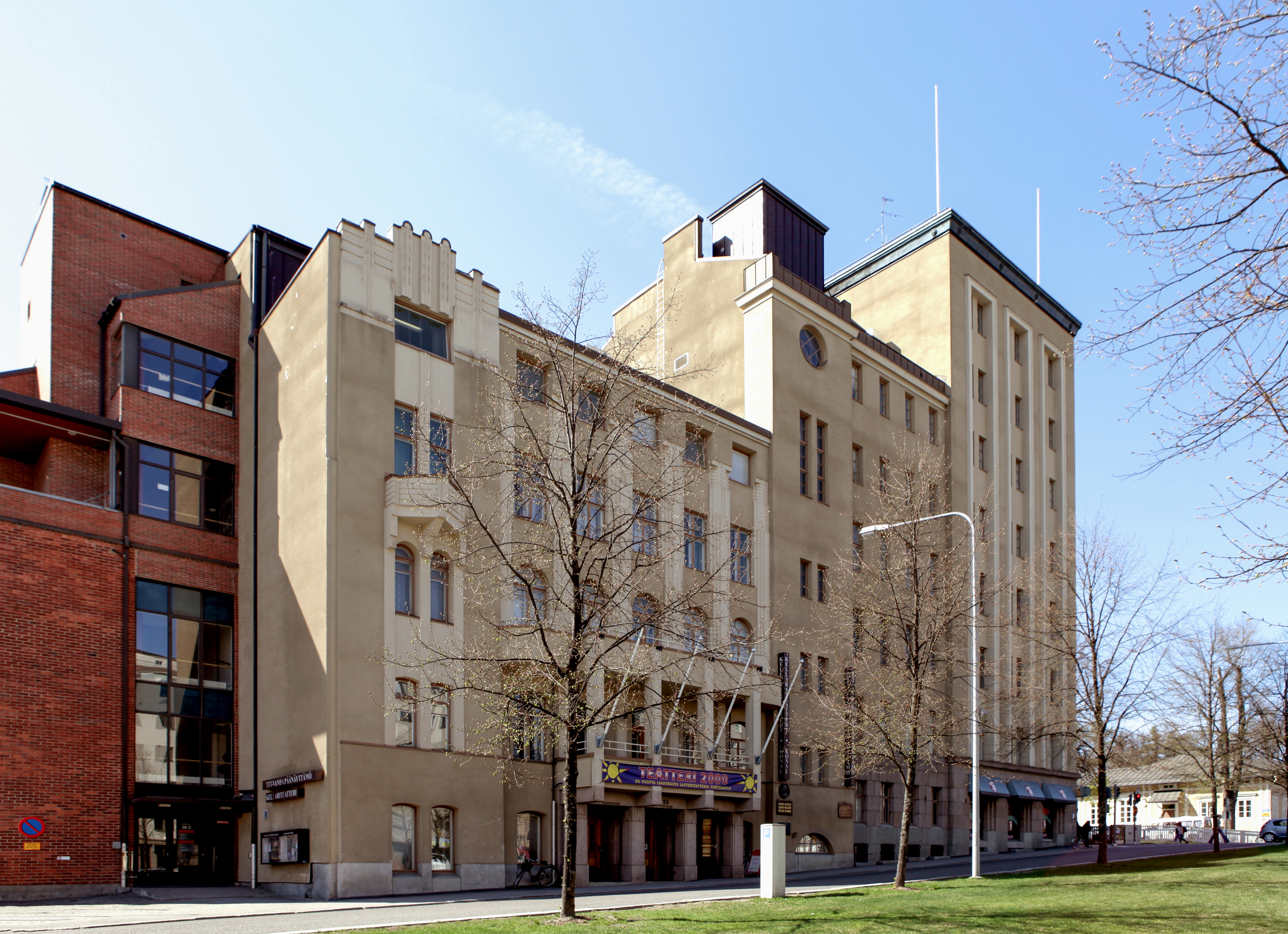
- Lenin Museum in Tampere, Finland
- Former name: Finnish Lenin Museum; Lenin Museo; Tampere Workers’ Hall
- Established: 20 January 1946
- Dissolved: 3 November 2024
- Location: Tampere, Pirkanmaa, Finland
- Coordinates: 61.4958°N 23.7517°E
- Type: Multiple generational history
- Historian: Finnish Labour Museum Werstas
- Owners: Finland-Russia Society; Finland-Soviet Union Society
- Website: www.lenin.fi/en/

The Tampere Lenin Museum (Finnish: Lenin-museo) was a museum devoted to Vladimir Lenin in Tampere, Finland. It was established in 1946 by the Finland–Soviet Union Society, and later was run by The Finnish Labour Museum Werstas. It was the first museum dedicated to Lenin outside the Soviet Union.

== History ==
The museum was located in the Tampere Workers' Hall. Built in 1900, the building hosted underground meetings of the Russian Social Democratic Labour Party in 1905 and 1906. During December 1905, Vladimir Lenin met Joseph Stalin in person for the first time at the Tampere conference of 1905 deliberating the civil disorder of the Russian Revolution of 1905.

The museum had a permanent exhibition with material related to Lenin's life and the history of the Soviet Union. It also organized varying exhibitions on different themes. The museum was awarded the Order of Friendship of Peoples in 1986 by the council of Supreme Soviet of the Soviet Union. Since the collapse of the Soviet Union, the museum has developed a more critical view to Lenin's work and the Soviet Union.

In April 2024, the museum announced that it would close at the end of the year and reopen in February 2025 under the name Nootti, in reference to the Note Crisis in 1961 between Finland and the Soviet Union. The museum's director, Kalle Kallio, said that the changes were meant to reflect the changes in Finland–Russia relations and added that the museum's old name did not "do justice" to its exhibits. The museum closed on 3 November 2024.

== Gallery ==
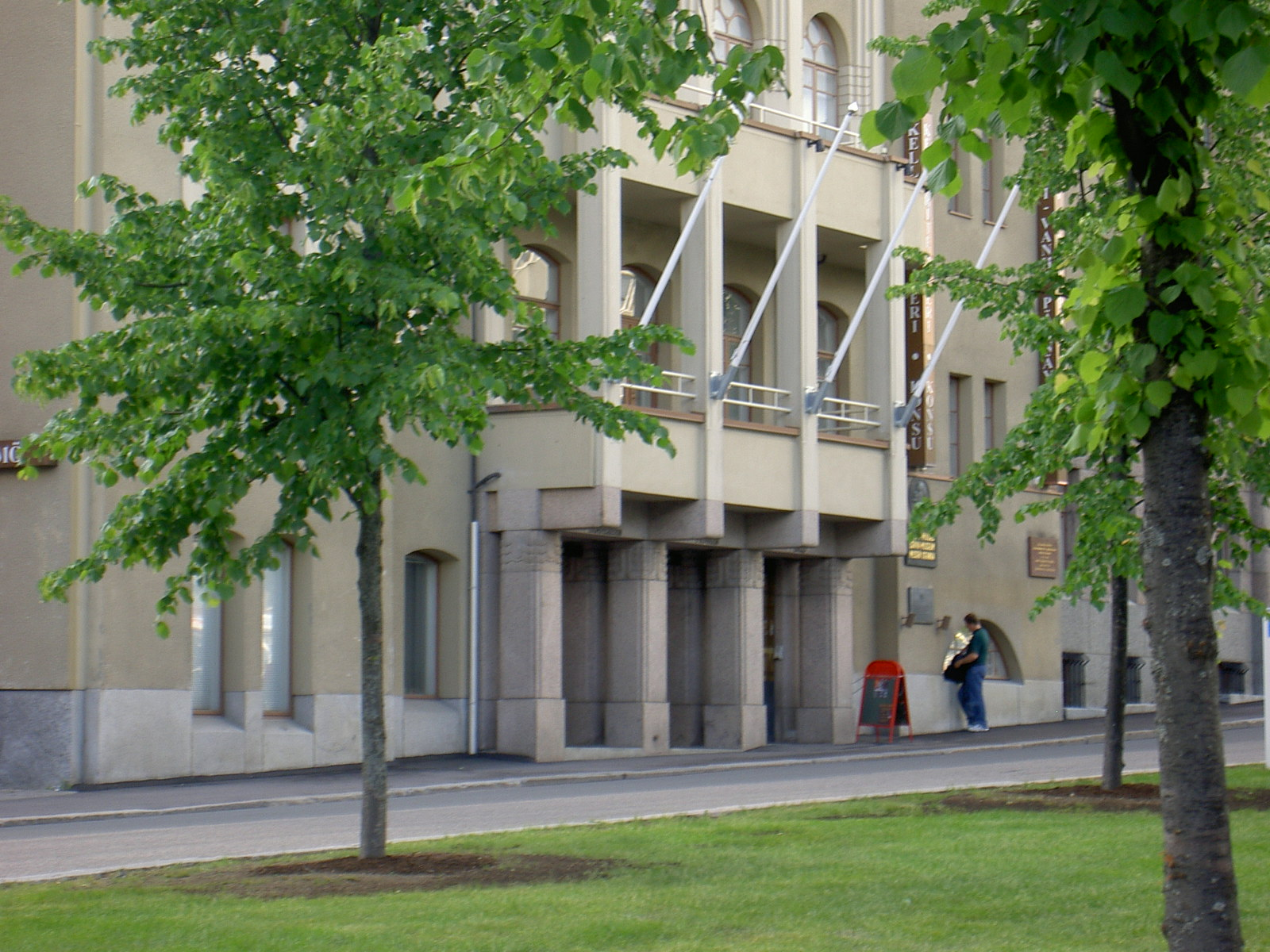
Frontal view of Lenin Museum

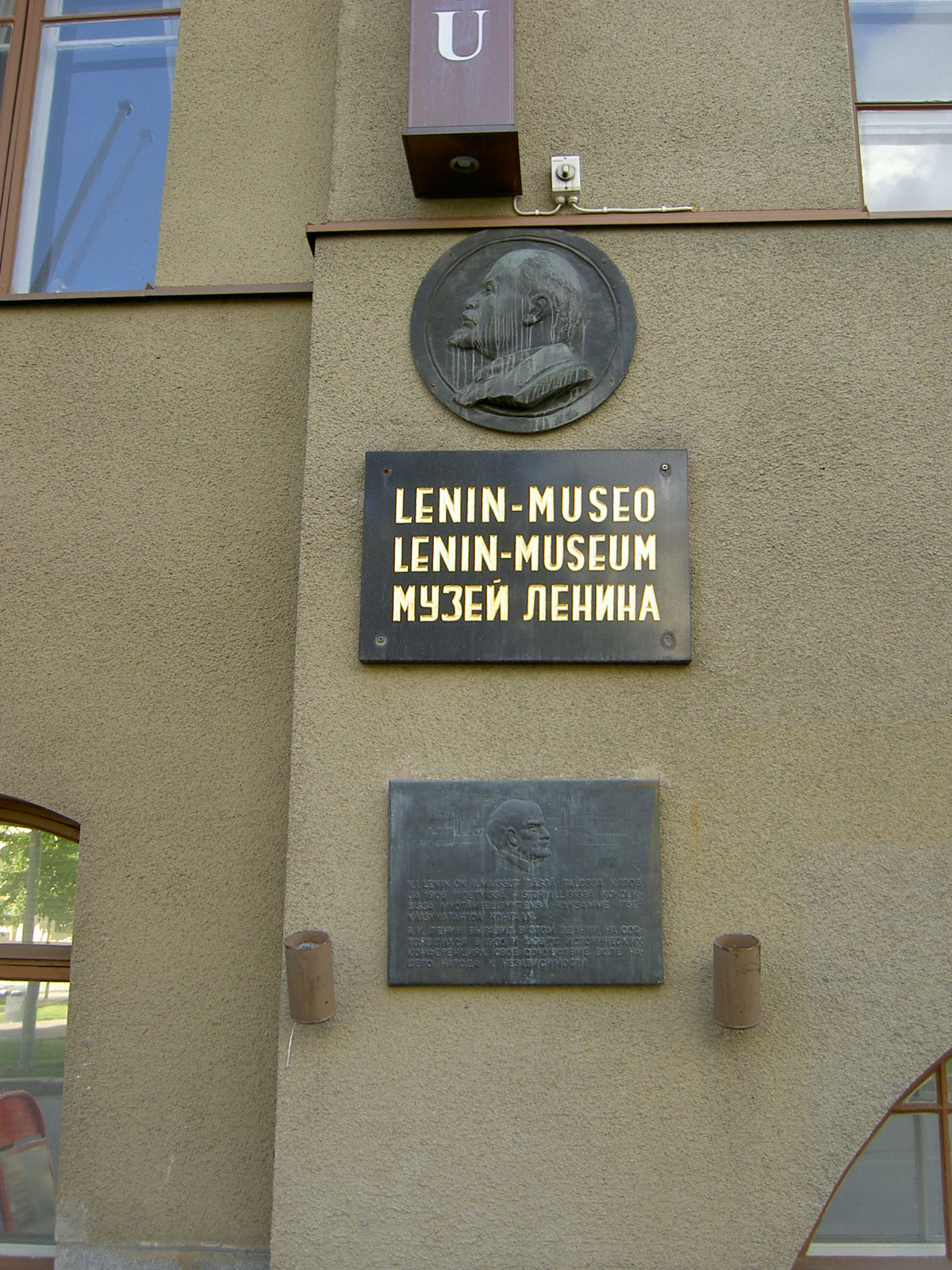
Exterior signage of Lenin Museum

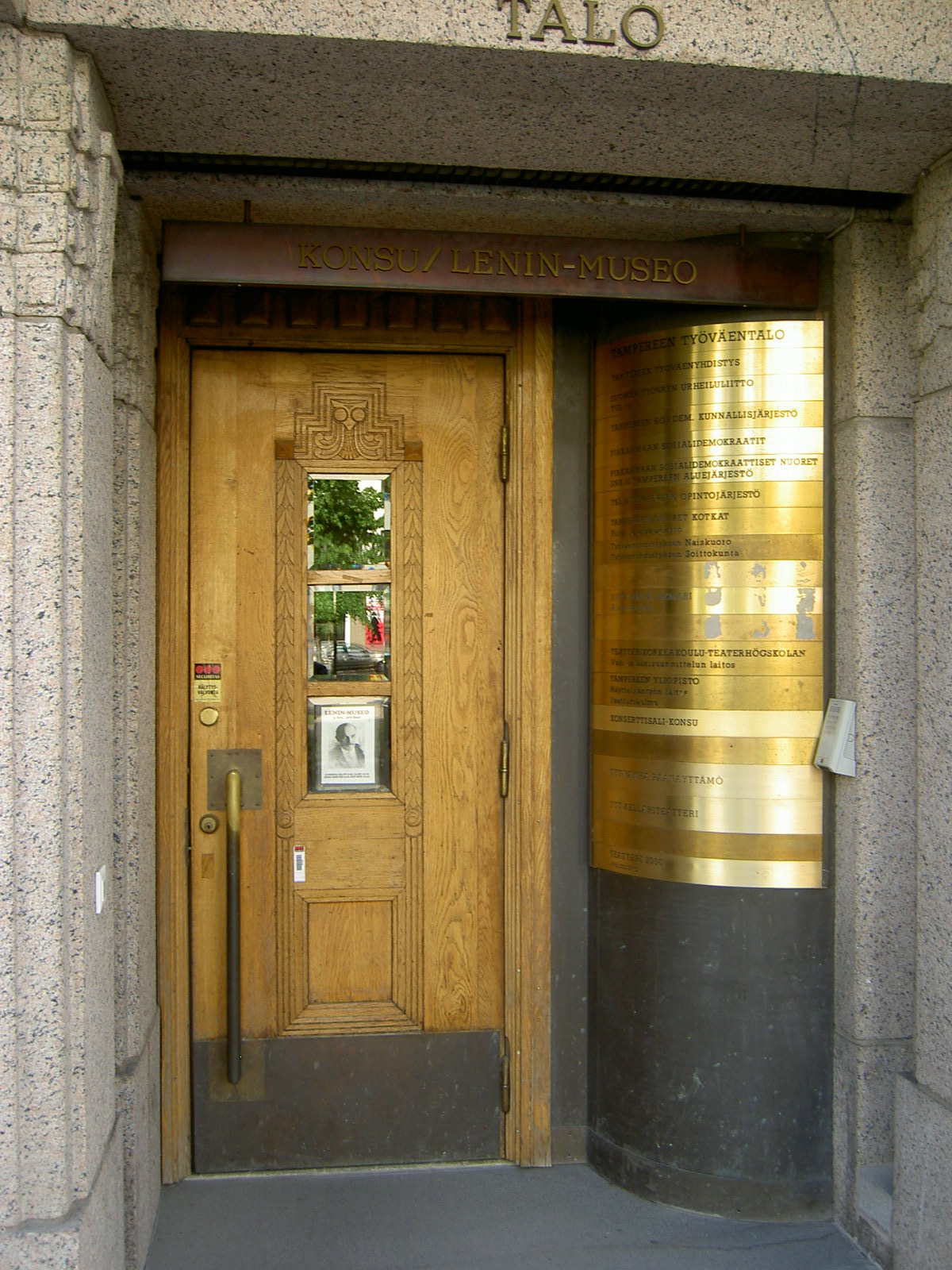
Entrance to Tampere Workers’ Hall

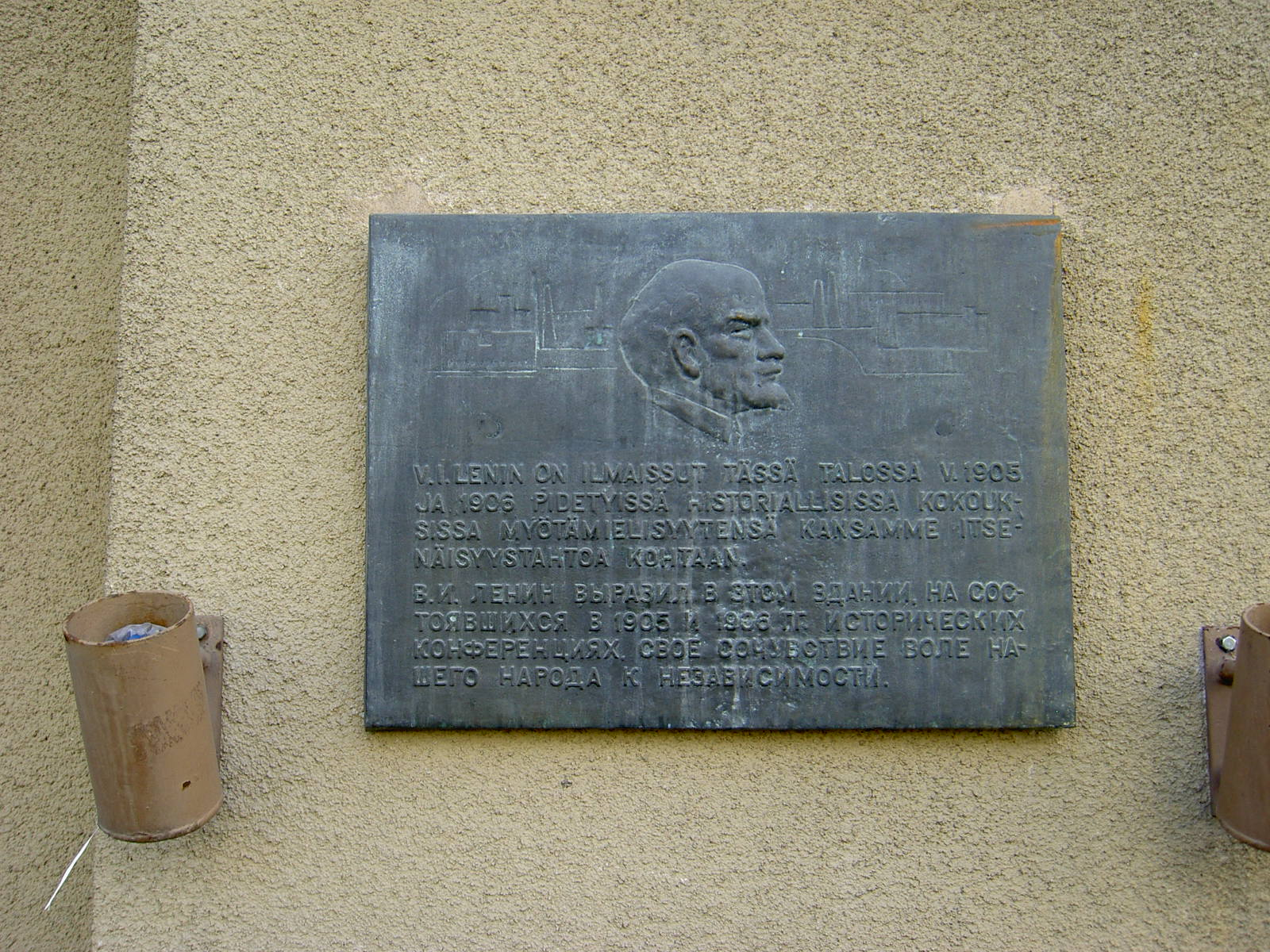
Finnish Lenin Museum observance plaque

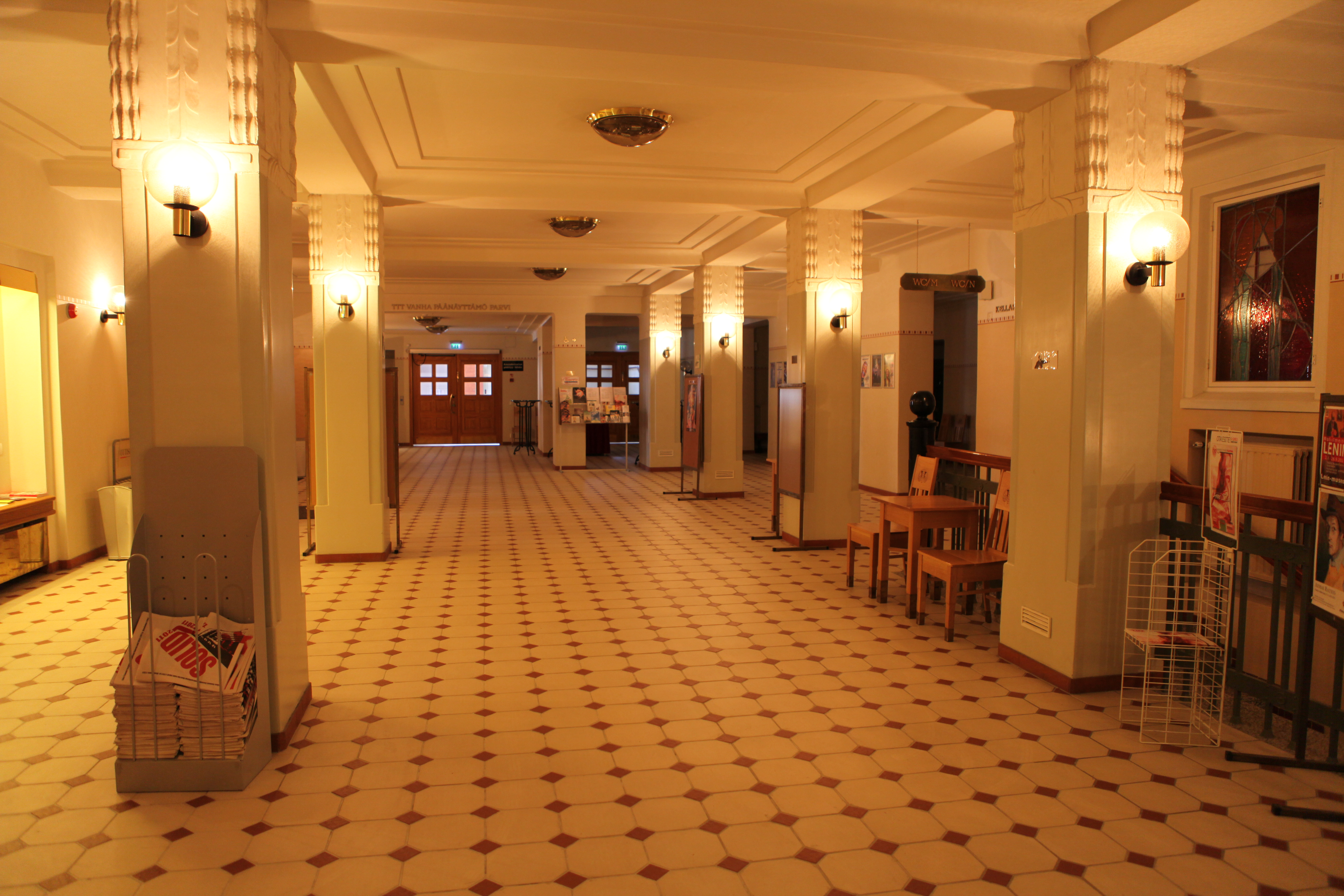
Gallery of Tampere Workers’ Hall

== See also ==
| ♦ Bolshevik Party | ♦ Russian State Duma |
| ♦ Council of People's Commissars of the Soviet Union | ♦ Tauride Palace |
| ♦ Russian Empire | ♦ Treaty for Establishment of Soviet Union |
