= 1st Congress of the Russian Social Democratic Labour Party =

Secret meeting in Minsk 1898

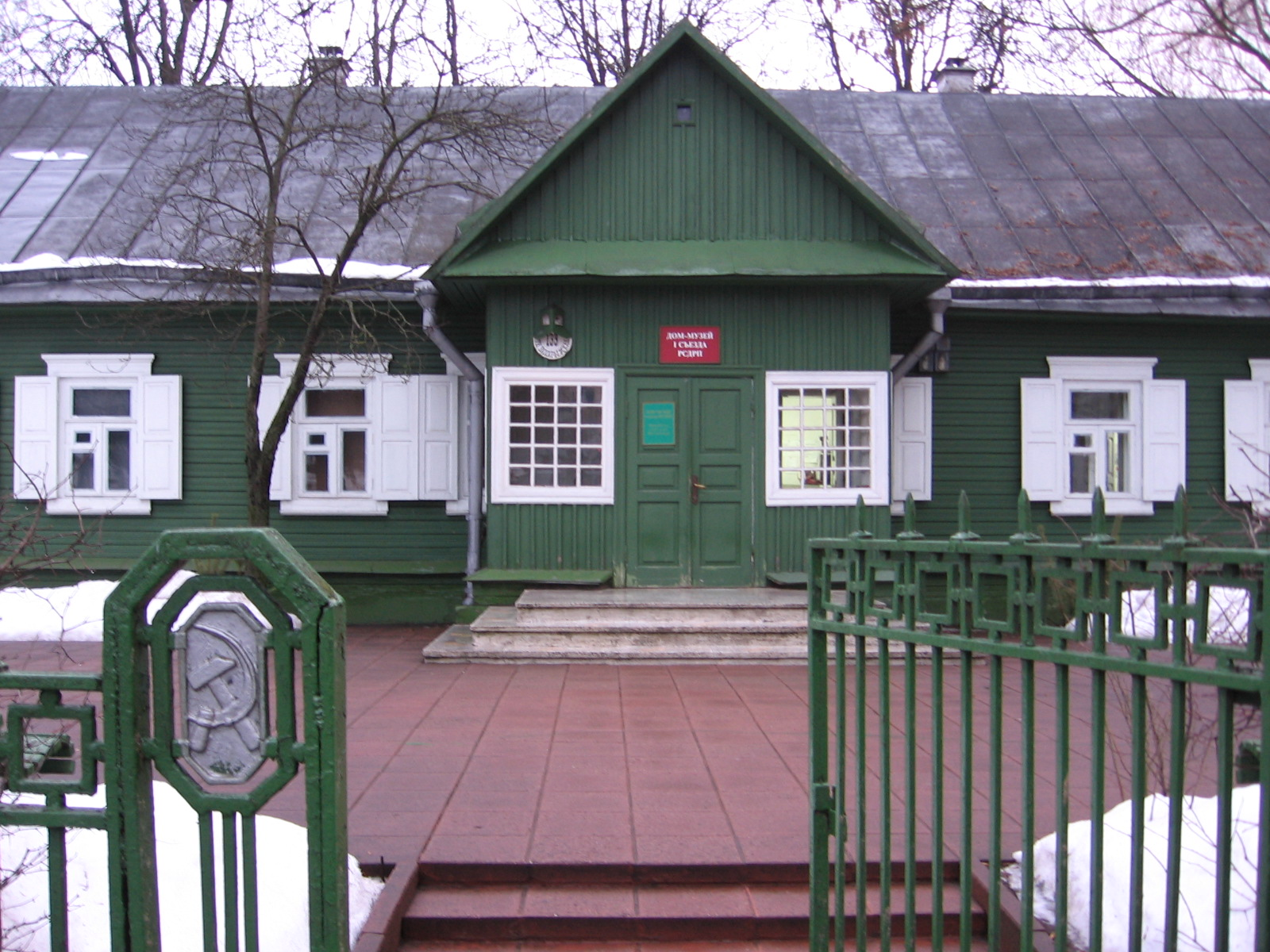
- The Congress was held in this house in Minsk
- Host country: Belarus, Russian Empire
- Date: March 13, 1898-March 15, 1898
- Cities: Minsk
- Participants: Julius Martov, Vladimir Lenin
- Precedes: 2nd Congress (1903)

The First Congress of the RSDLP (Russian: Российская социал-демократическая рабочая партия, РСДРП) was held between 13 March – 15 March (1 March–3 March O.S.) 1898 in Minsk, Russian Empire (now Belarus) in secrecy. The venue was a house belonging to Rumyantsev, a railway worker on the outskirts of Minsk (now in the town centre). The cover story was that they were celebrating the nameday of Rumyantsev's wife. A stove was kept burning in the next room in case secret papers had to be burnt.

== Proceedings ==
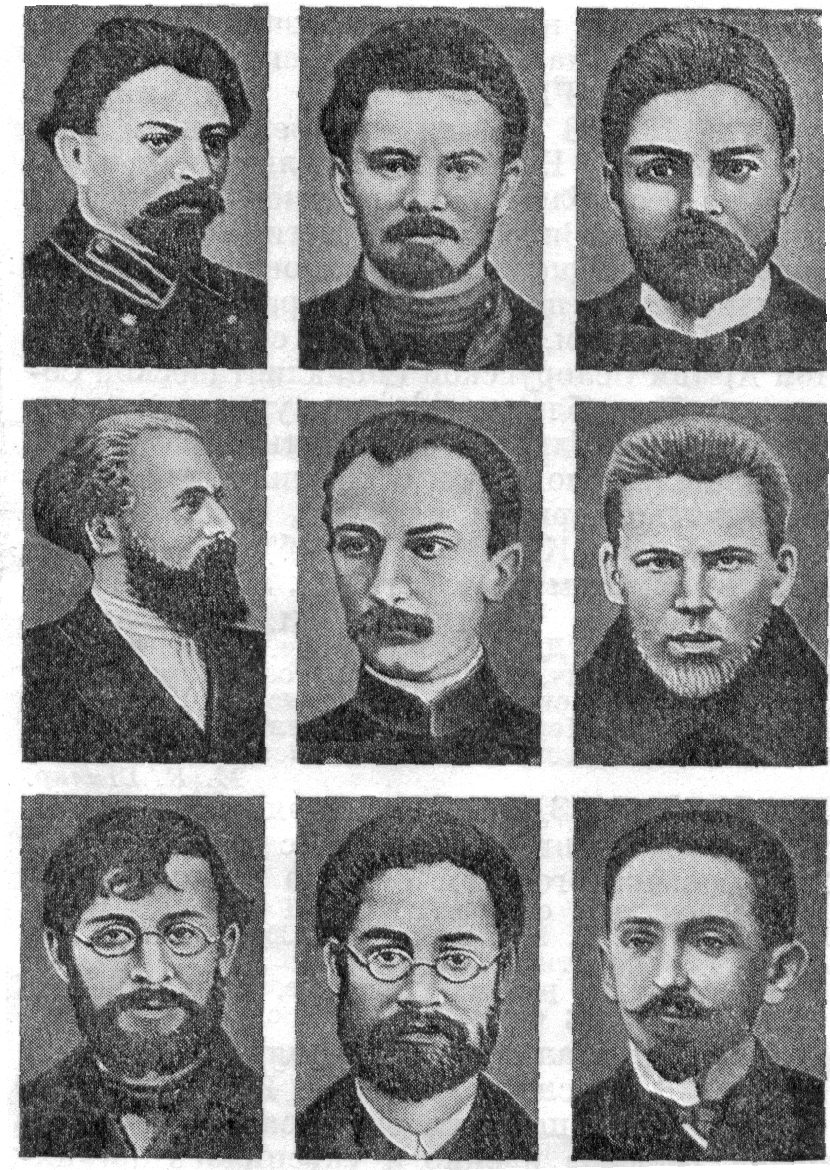
Delegates of the 1st Congress of the RSDLP (in rows): (1) S. Radchenko, A. Vannovsky, P. Tuchapsky, (2) B. Eidelman, N. Vigdorchik, K. Petrusevich, (3) A. Mutnik, A. Kremer, Sh. Katz

The Congress was convened by three major social democratic groups from different areas of the Russian Empire.

1. The Saint Petersburg-based League of Struggle for the Emancipation of the Working Class, which had been active since 1895. The future founder of Menshevism Juliy Martov and the future founder of Bolshevism Vladimir Lenin were among its leaders in 1895–1896. Although one of the oldest in the Empire, this group could not play a significant role since it had been recently weakened by arrests.
2. The General Jewish Labour Bund, which had united Yiddish speaking social democrats in the Pale of Settlement in September 1897. At the time, the Bund was the largest socialist group in the Empire and sponsored the Congress.
3. The social democratic organization formed in 1897 around the Kiev-based Rabochaya Gazeta (Workers' Newspaper).

There were 9 delegates to the Congress representing these three groups as well as social democrats from Moscow and Yekaterinoslav. The Kharkov socialists refused to come thinking the move premature.

There were 6 sessions, with no minutes taken because of the need for secrecy; only resolutions were recorded. The major issues discussed by the delegates were merging all social democratic groups into one party and selecting the party's name. The Congress also elected a Central Committee of three: Stepan Radchenko, one of the oldest Russian social democrats and a leader of the Saint Petersburg League, Boris Eidelmann of Rabochaya Gazeta and Arkadi Kremer, a Jewish Bund leader. The Manifesto of the new party was written by Peter Struve at Radchenko's request.

The Central Committee elected by Congress printed the Manifesto and the resolutions of the Congress, but five of the nine delegates were arrested by the Okhrana within a month.

The first Congress failed to unite the Russian Social Democracy, neither through the proposed Statutes nor the Programme. A wave of police repression followed, which prevented the party from functioning as a cohesive body for several years and ushered in a period of internal schisms and dissension. Three of the delegates weren't arrested, but only because Zubatov thought they would lead him to other members. It was not until 1903 that the 2nd Congress of the RSDLP was held abroad and adopted the party's Charter and Programme.

== Central Committee ==
Members of the Central Committee of the 1st Congress of the Russian Social Democratic Labour Party
Name	Cyrillic	2nd CC	Birth	Death	Ethnicity	Portrait
Boris Eidelmann	Борис Эйдельман	Arrested	1867	1939	Jewish	
Arkadi Kremer	Арка́дий Кре́мер	Arrested	1865	1935	Jewish	
Stepan Radchenko	Степан Радченко	Arrested	1869	1911	Russian	
