= Nasha Zarya =

- First issue of Nasha Zarya, May 1912
- Native name: Наша заря
- Editor-in-chief: Alexander Potresov
- Founded: 1910
- Ceased publication: 1914
- Political alignment: Liquidationism
- Language: Russian
- City: Saint Petersburg

Nasha Zarya (Russian: Наша заря - meaning Our Dawn in English) was a legal Menshevik monthly, published in St. Petersburg, Russia from 1910 to 1914. Lenin described it as 'the liquidators' centre in Russia'.

== Profile ==
Nasha Zarya was started by the organizing committee, a leading Menshevik centre.

== Notable articles ==
- "The Contemporary Situation in Russia and the Fundamental Task of the Working Class Movement in the Present Moment" by Nikolai Aleksandrovich Rozhkov.
