= Anna Rozental =

Belarusian and Soviet Bundist activist

- Born: Anna Heller; October 14, 1872; Volkovisk, Russian Empire
- Died: 1940 (aged 67–68); Vilnius
- Occupations: Dentist, activist, politician
- Movement: Jewish Labour Bund
- Spouse: Pavel Rosental

Anna Rozental (October 14, 1872 – 1940) was a Bundist activist in the Russian Empire and later Soviet Russia. Her Vilna apartment served as a site of refuge for Bundists fleeing the German occupation elsewhere.

== Early life ==
Rozental was born as Anna Heller on October 14, 1872, in Volkovisk, Russian Empire (now Vawkavysk in Belarus), to a wealthy, well-respected family. At the age of six, her father declared bankruptcy and her family was forced to leave the city. After her father's death in 1889, she moved to Vilna (now Vilnius, Lithuania) and first studied to be a teacher, then a dentist.

== Activism ==
Rozental first became active in the Hovevei Zion. The Russian socialist leader Arkadi Kremer was her mathematics teacher and got her involved with the Bund in 1897. Here she met her future husband Pavel (Pinai) Rozental. The couple moved to Białystok in 1899 where she worked as a dentist. They became involved with the local Bund here after the arrest of the first party leadership. They were arrested in 1902 and banished to Siberia. They were released as result of the Russian Revolution of 1905, they returned to Vilna, where they continued their work in the Bund.

== World War I and the interwar period ==
The Rozentals moved to Saint Petersburg after the outbreak of World War I in 1917, where Anna become the Secretary of the Bund central committee. They returned to Vilna in 1921. The Bund at this time went through a split between its left and right factions, and was incorporated into the Polish Bund, which became one of the political parties of the Second Polish Republic.

After Pavel's death in 1924, Anna became the chairman of the Bund and became a member of the party's central committee in Warsaw. She worked with the TSYSHO (CISZO) Central Jewish School Organization and the women's organization YAF (Jewish Women Workers) to set up Yiddish schools and children's daycare centers in Vilna. In 1938, she was elected to the Vilna city council. The Bundists under her leadership formed the largest Jewish faction on the council. Her Vilna apartment became a hub for all local Bundist activity. The apartment became a refuge for fleeing Bundists from all over of area occupied by Germany.

== World War II ==
Rozental was arrested by the Soviet secret service at the beginning of World War II. She later died in a Soviet prison.
