= Pati Kremer =

Russian revolutionary socialist (1867–1943)

Pati Kremer (1867–1943) was a Russian revolutionary socialist and pioneer of the General Jewish Workers' Union in Lithuania, Poland and Russia (Bund). She was the wife of Arkadi Kremer.

== Biography ==
Pati Kremer was born Matla Srednicki on 2 January 1867 in Vilna. She was the daughter of a wealthy merchant. In the 1880s she moved to St. Petersburg to study dentistry and there became involved with revolutionary political circles. She was also active in educational and literacy projects for workers. In 1889 she was arrested for the first time. Upon her release, she returned to Vilna, where she became a leading member and organizer of the Jewish Social-Democratic circle known as the 'Vilna Group', together with John Mill (1870–1952) and Arkadi Kremer (1865–1935). Pati and Arkadi were subsequently married.

The Vilna Group was one of the precursors of the Bund and of the Russian Social-Democratic Workers' Party (RSDRP). Pati Kremer was arrested again in September 1897 and banished to Mogilev. There she resumed her activities on behalf of the Bund, working with other political exiles and local workers. In 1898 she secretly attended the second congress of the Bund in Kovno. In 1902, she and Arkadi (who had been arrested in 1898) escaped abroad, making their way to Britain, the US, Switzerland and France. They mostly remained in France until 1921, becoming French citizens and working with the French Socialist Party as well as the Bund.

In 1921, the Kremers returned to Vilna, where Arkadi became chairman of the local branch of the Bund. Pati Kremer worked as editor and translator in the publishing house of Boris Kletskin (1875–1937), a Bundist. In 1935, her husband died, and she began work on a commemorative volume eventually published in New York in 1942. During the German occupation of Vilna in the Second World War she became a leading figure in the city's Jewish ghetto, organizing and maintaining secret Yiddish libraries and clandestine meetings of the Bund. When the ghetto was razed by the Germans in September 1943, Pati Kremer was among the many victims who were rounded up, transported to the Sobibor extermination camp and murdered.

== Sources ==
- Pickhan, G., 'Pati Kremer.' In: Hyman, P.E. (ed.), Jewish Women. A Comprehensive Historical Encyclopedia. Jerusalem, 2006. Online at: http://jwa.org/encyclopedia/article/kremer-pati.
- Jacobs, J., 'Bund.' In: Hypan, P.E. op. cit. Online at: http://jwa.org/encyclopedia/article/bund.
- Frankel, J., Prophecy and Politics: Socialism, Nationalism, and the Russian Jews, 1862–1917. Cambridge, 1981.
