= Vilna Group =

The Vilna Group was a circle of Jewish Social-Democrats which met secretly in the city of Vilna, then part of the Russian empire (now Vilnius in Lithuania).

== Activities ==
The group was founded in the mid-1890s. Its members devoted themselves to disseminating Marxist and socialist literature to Jewish textile workers and to some extent to Jewish and non-Jewish workers generally, providing literacy and education classes for workers and supporting the formation of trade unions. They were among the first to produce socialist literature in Yiddish. All this was illegal and had to be done clandestinely, and all members of the Vilna Group were arrested at various points.

This group was one of the forerunners of the General Union of Jewish Workers of Lithuania, Poland and Russia (known as the "Bund"), founded on October 7, 1897.

== Members ==
The Vilna group included, among others:

- Arkadi Kremer
- Tsemakh Kopelzon
- Pati Kremer (a.k.a. Matla Srednicki or Srednitskaya)
- John Mill
- Mikhail Liber
- Leo Jogiches

== Legacy ==
It was one of the precursors of the General Jewish Workers' Association in Lithuania, Poland, and Russia (known as the 'Bund'), founded in 1897. The Vilna Group also played a role in founding the Russian Social-Democratic Workers' Party (RSDRP) in 1898. Most veterans of the Vilna Group later supported the Mensheviks.
