= Tampere conference of 1905 =

Conference of Russian Social Democratic Labour Party

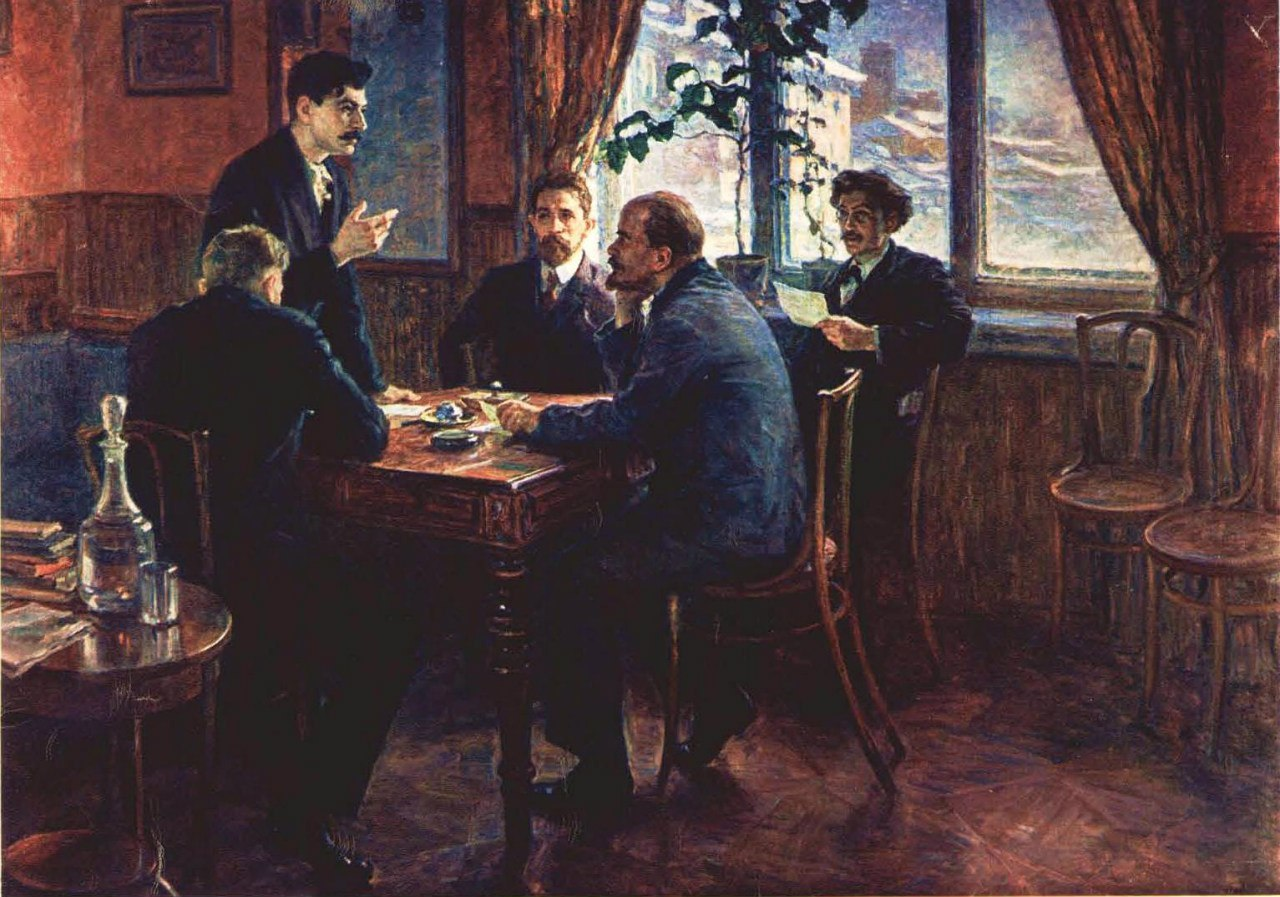
Painting of Stalin and Lenin at the Tampere Conference by Aleksandr Moravov (1951)

The first conference of the Bolshevik faction of the Russian Social Democratic Labour Party (RSDLP) took place in Tampere (Tammerfors), Grand Duchy of Finland, in December 1905. Held between the 1905 London and 1906 Stockholm party congresses at the Tampere Workers' Hall, the conference was an unofficial meeting of the Bolsheviks. It is particularly remembered for playing host to the first meeting of Vladimir Lenin and Joseph Stalin. The conference resolved to forgo participation in the new State Duma, as did most of the far left parties. They later reversed this decision in 1907.

The Tampere conference was conducted in secrecy, and little record remains of its proceedings. The only known documents that remain are the printed record of the resolutions reached at the meeting, and Lenin's report on its results. The exact timeframe of the conference is also unclear. Finnish sources suggest that it was held on 25–30 December, whilst according to Russian historian G. Kramolnikov, who wrote about the conference in the 1930s, it was opened earlier, with the first sessions held on 23 December.

== Background ==
A solicitation for the Tampere meeting appeared in the Bolshevik Novaya Zhizn newspaper in late November 1905. It invited regional Bolshevik organisations to elect representatives to attend a conference in Finland, to be opened on 23 December. The conference was intended as a meeting of the Lenin-led Bolshevik faction of the RSDLP, which had strengthened following the 3rd party congress, held in London earlier that year. That November, the Menshevik faction held its own "second general conference" in St. Petersburg. Unrest caused by the Russian Revolution of 1905, however, prevented many Bolshevik regional organisations from sending representatives to Tampere, including those from Moscow, Samara, and Nizhny Novgorod. As such, the meeting was lowered in status from party congress to conference.

Just before the conference on 21 December, the Moscow Soviet (Workers' Council), which was controlled by the Bolsheviks, decided to begin an armed rebellion. At the start of the party conference, the outcome of the rebellion was not yet known. Furthermore, the Russian government had just issued an election law for the new State Duma, which became a topic of debate at the conference.

The conference was intended to be held in St. Petersburg, but this was later deemed unfeasible due to the ongoing unrest there. Finland was chosen as the new site of the conference because no passport was needed to travel there. Yrjö Sirola, secretary of the Finnish Social Democratic Party, recommended the city of Tampere, as no Russian troops were stationed there. In addition, Tampere's mayor welcomed anti-Tsarist activists of all kinds, and the city was home to a powerful labour movement. Lenin initially opposed the Tampere option for the conference, but changed his mind after the general strike that took place there during the Russian Revolution of 1905. According to the announcement that appeared in Novaya Zhizn, representatives attending the conference were to meet at Finland Station in St. Petersburg on 21 December, after which they would proceed by train to Tampere in small groups.

The Finnish organisers of conference are of uncertain identity. Editor of the Kansan Lehti newspaper Vihtori Kosonen has been suggested as one of them.

== The conference ==
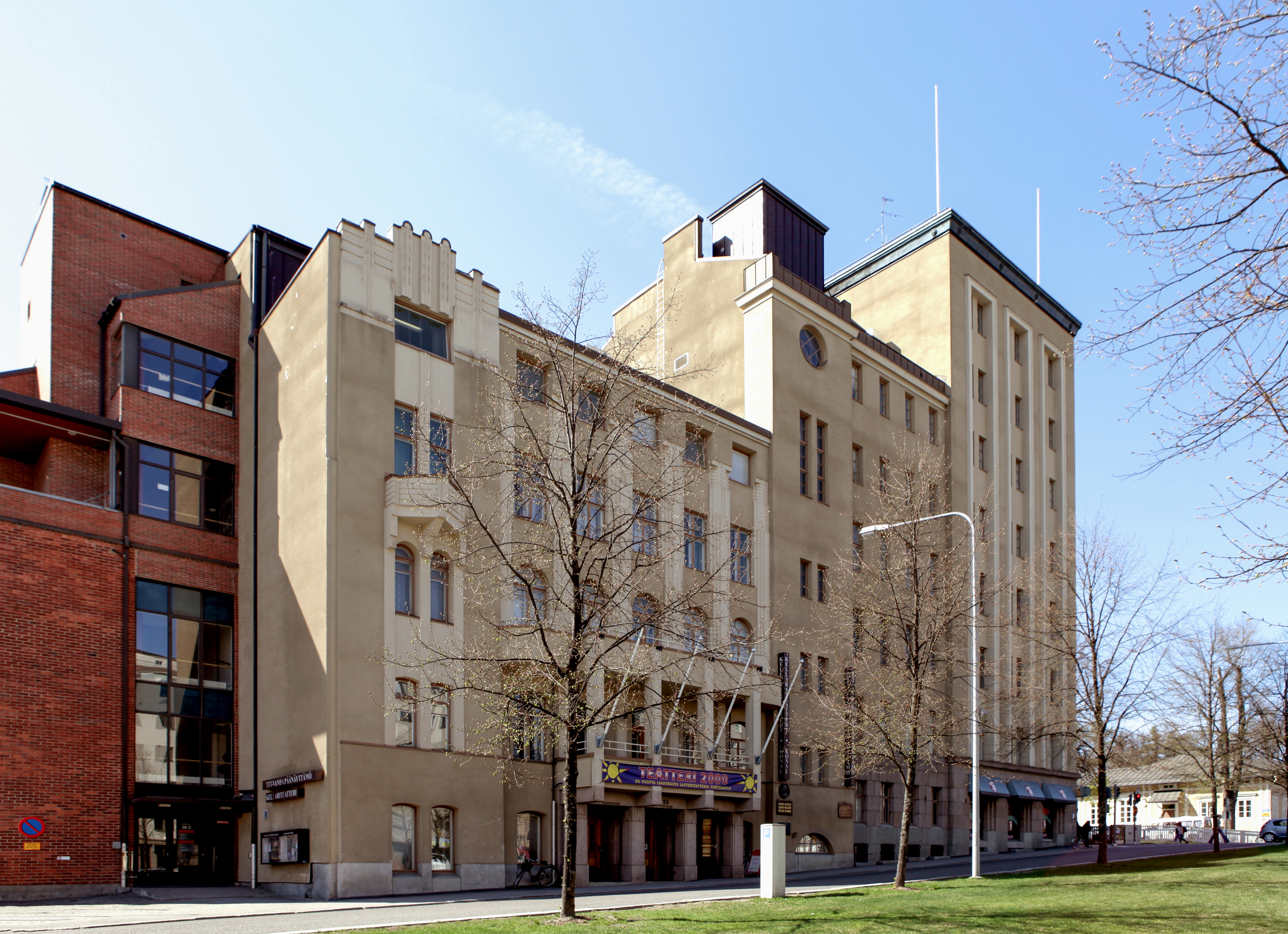
Tampere Workers' Hall, where the conference was held, in 2011

The conference was held at the five-year old Tampere Workers' Hall, which was built by the Tampere Workers' Society as a "People's House" leisure and cultural centre for the working class. The hall was considered an ideal place to hold the conference, as the sheer number of events and activities held there provided cover for covert activities. The Workers' Society offered to provide space in the hall free-of-charge, organised a guard to keep watch for the Tsarist secret police, and provided accommodation for the representatives at local hotels. Sessions of the conference began on 23 December, though it was not officially opened until the next day. Lenin was elected chairman, with Boris Goldman (known by the alias Gorev) and Mikhail Borodin (known by the alias Kiril) selected as deputy chairmen. On Lenin's suggestion, all representatives to the conference used aliases, for fear of detection by the secret police. Well-known representatives to the conference include Fyodor Dan, Leonid Krasin, Julius Martov, Alexei Rykov. Leo Laukki represented the FSDP.

A total of 41 representatives of regional RSDLP organisations from across Russia attended the conference. The first order of business was the presentation of information regarding ongoing events in each region of Russia, and a discussion about the actions of the Central Committee of the RSDLP. Lenin gave at least two speeches at the conference, and these were subsequently praised by Stalin in his memoirs. The atmosphere at the conference was one of great revolutionary enthusiasm, which was lauded by Lenin's wife, Nadezhda Krupskaya. According to her, members of the Tampere Red Guards even taught the Russians how to shoot rifles.

The primary issue raised at the conference was the split between the Bolshevik and Menshevik factions of the party. The Bolsheviks desired to mend the split, but would not consider compromising the Bolshevik ideology in searching for a resolution. At Tampere, they considered methods for restoring co-operation between the two factions, even if the formal split could not be resolved. In the end, the conference resolved to mend the split between Bolsheviks and Mensheviks on the basis of equality between the two factions, and issued its support for the merger of parallel Menshevik and Bolshevik regional organisations.

They also considered the "agrarian question", a term used by marxists to refer to debate over whether the rural-based peasantry would support an urban-based proletarian revolution. In reference to this question, the conference voted to demand the confiscation of all private, state, and church land. Finally, the conference discussed the upcoming elections to the newly established State Duma. Most representatives at the conference considered the recently publicised State Duma election law to be a "travesty of parliamentarianism", and urged a boycott of the elections. Lenin, along with Gorev, dissented, suggesting that the election law could be exploited to the Bolsheviks' advantage, and that it was necessary to be flexible in efforts to constrain the power of the Tsar. In the face of intense opposition, Lenin abandoned this position, and endorsed the majority's call for an electoral boycott and an endorsement of the ongoing armed uprising in Moscow, which was then adopted. Another decision made at the conference was to reorganise the party into a more centralised framework, in line with Lenin's principles of democratic centralism.

=== Meeting of Lenin and Stalin ===
Lenin and Stalin's first meeting took place during the conference at a meeting room in the Tampere Workers' Hall. Stalin later wrote in his memoirs that the meeting had been at first a disappointment. He had assumed that Lenin would be a grand figure, physically bigger than everyone else present, but found instead that he was shorter than average, and looked no different from any of the other representatives present at the conference. Stalin also wrote that he thought it was customary for great men to arrive late to such functions, so as to facilitate the gathered public's waiting in anticipation. Lenin, however, arrived on time, chatting with acquaintances at a corner table, and greeting the representatives in an informal manner. Stalin wrote that, at the time, he considered this to be "violation of certain essential rules", but later realised that this "simplicity and modesty" were Lenin's greatest qualities as a leader of the "rank and file" of humanity. The room where Lenin and Stalin met is now part of the Tampere Lenin Museum.

== Myths surrounding the conference ==
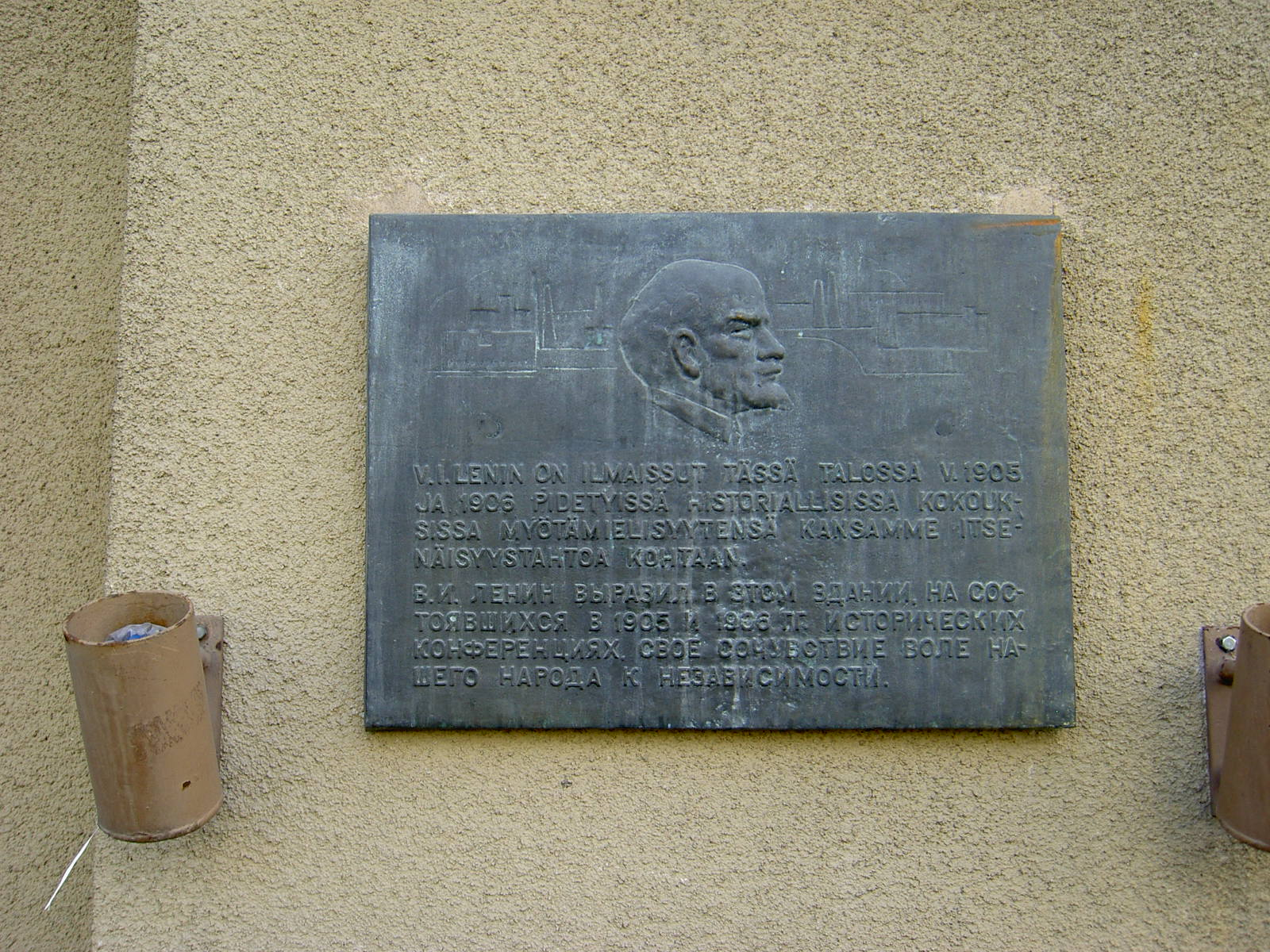
A commemorative plaque on the wall of the Tampere Workers' Hall

As no minutes of the proceedings of the conference exist, nor are there any photos of the meeting itself, there is very little reliable information about what really occurred at the conference and people's memories of the event are more or less distorted. Furthermore, because the meeting was attended by figures of major historical importance, including Lenin and Stalin, numerous legends and myths have sprung up about that are not necessarily true. For example, Lenin and his wife Nadezhda Krupskaya allegedly stayed at a guest house on the corner of Rautatienkatu and Kyttälänkatu in Tampere, as indicated by a plaque commemorating this on the wall of the building. In fact, there was not yet a guest house at that location in 1905, and Lenin probably stayed at the Hotel Bauer, as did many of the other delegates.

Another story describes how the Finnish journalist and activist J. E. Zidbäck prevented Lenin and Stalin from being arrested by the Tsarist secret police based on information he had received from Helsinki. Zidbäck claimed that hundreds of state police and gendarmes had already arrived in town on Christmas Eve. His version of these events, however, is inconsistent with other information; for example, Emil Viljanen, who was president of the Tampere Workers' Society at the time, did not corroborate this story.

In a radio interview in 1949, Matti Vuolukka claimed that Lenin had promised Finland its independence at the conference should the Bolsheviks rise to power. It appears, however, that the promise Vuolukka is remembering took place at the second party congress in Tampere in November 1906. Furthermore, Lenin's promise likely only pertained to Finland's internal autonomy.

== See also ==
- Central Committee of the 1st Conference of the Russian Social Democratic Labour Party
