= Central Committee of the 1st Conference of the Russian Social Democratic Labour Party =

The Central Committee of the 1st Conference of the Russian Social Democratic Labour Party, better known as the Tampere conference of 1905, was in session from 1905 until 1906.

== Composition ==
Members of the Central Committee of the 1st Conference of the Russian Social Democratic Labour Party
Name	Cyrillic	3rd CC.	4th CC.	Birth	Death	PM	Faction	Nationality	Gender	Portrait
Fyodor Dan	Борис Бахметьев	New	Reelected	1871	1947	?	Menshevik	Jewish	Male	
Rozaliya Galberstadt	Розалия Гальберштадт	New	Not	1877	1940	1898	Menshevik	Jewish	Female	
Nikolay Iordansky	Николай Иорданский	New	Not	1876	1928	1899	Menshevik	Russian	Male	—
Leonid Krasin	Леонид Красин	Old	Reelected	1873	1926	1896	Bolshevik	Russian	Male	
Viktor Krokhmal	Виктор Крохмаль	New	Reelected	1873	1933	?	Menshevik	Ukrainian	Male	
Isaak Lalayants	Исаак Лалаянц	New	Not	1870	1933	1898	Bolshevik	Armenian	Male	
Julius Martov	Ю́лий Мартов	New	Not	1873	1926	1896	Menshevik	Jewish	Male	
Pyotr Rumyantsev	Пётр Румянцев	Old	Not	1870	1925	1896	Bolshevik	Russian	Male	—
Alexei Rykov	Алексей Рыков	Old	Reelected	1881	1938	1899	Bolshevik	Russian	Male	
Ivan Summer	Иван Саммер	Old	Not	1870	1921	1898	Bolshevik	Ukrainian	Male	—
