= Liquidationism =

Concept in Leninist theory

Liquidationism (Russian: Ликвидаторство) was the ideology among some members of the Russian Social Democratic Labour Party (RSDLP) who argued for the abandonment of the underground party work and transition to exclusively legal political activities.

== Concept ==
According to the Bolshevik leader Vladimir Lenin, writing in 1909, liquidationism "consists ideologically in negation of the revolutionary class struggle of the socialist proletariat in general, and denial of the hegemony of the proletariat". The term refers to the alleged liquidation of the old-style RSDLP.

Nikolai Rozhkov was identified by Lenin as a liquidationist.

In his concluding remarks to the 1914 Marxism and Liquidationism symposium, Lenin made the distinction between "Left liquidationism", which is "leaning towards anarchism", and "Right liquidationism", which is "liquidationism proper" and "leans towards liberalism".

== See also ==
- Vanguardism
- Reformism
- Bolshevism
- Menshevism
- Factions of the Russian Social Democratic Labour Party, which later split into Bolsheviks and Mensheviks
