= Boris Eidelmann =

Russian revolutionary and educator (1867–1939)

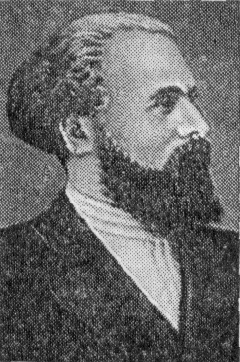
- Boris Eidelmann

Member of the Central Committee of the RSDLP

Personal details
- Born: February 11, 1867 Strizhavka, Russian Empire
- Died: August 2, 1939 (aged 72) Moscow, USSR
- Party: RSDLP

Boris Lvovich Eidelmann (Russian: Бори́с Льво́вич Эйдельма́н; February 11, 1867 — August 2, 1939) was a figure in the Russian revolutionary movement, an educator, and a publicist.

== Early life and revolutionary activities ==
He was born in the village of Stryzhavka (now in Vinnytsia Raion, Vinnytsia Oblast, Ukraine) into small merchant family of Jewish origin. In 1890, he entered Kyiv University, and from 1893, he became involved in revolutionary activities. From 1894 to 1897, he participated in the establishment of the Russian Social Democratic Group, the group "Workers' Cause," "Workers' Newspaper," and the Kyiv "Union for the Struggle for the Liberation of the Working Class." In 1898, he participated in the 1st Congress of the RSDLP in Minsk, where he and Natan Abramovich Vigdorchik represented the "Workers' Newspaper". At the congress, he was elected to the Central Committee of the RSDLP but was soon arrested and imprisoned in the Peter and Paul Fortress, and in 1900, he was exiled to Siberia. After returning from exile, he participated in the 1905 Russian Revolution, after which he withdrew from revolutionary activities. In 1910, he graduated from the medical faculty of Kyiv University. After the October Revolution of 1917, he worked in the People's Commissariat of Labor, and from 1919, he taught at the Moscow Higher Military Command School. He authored several publications on the history of the revolutionary movement in Russia, some of which were included in the book "The First Congress of the RSDLP." He died in Moscow. The urn with his ashes is buried in the columbarium of the Novodevichy Cemetery in Moscow, Russia.

== Publications ==
- The First Congress of the RSDLP, M.-L., 1926

== Literature ==
- The First Congress of the RSDLP. Documents and Materials, M., 1958
- History of the CPSU, vol. 1, M., 1964
