= Wilno (disambiguation) =

Wilno is the Polish name of the city of Vilnius, Lithuania.

Wilno may also refer to:

- Wilno, Minnesota, United States
- Wilno, Ontario, Canada
- No. 317 "City of Wilno" Polish Fighter Squadron

== See also ==
- Wilno Voivodeship (disambiguation)
