= Maria Essen =

Bolshevik revolutionary and writer (1872–1956)

- Мария Моисеевна Эссен
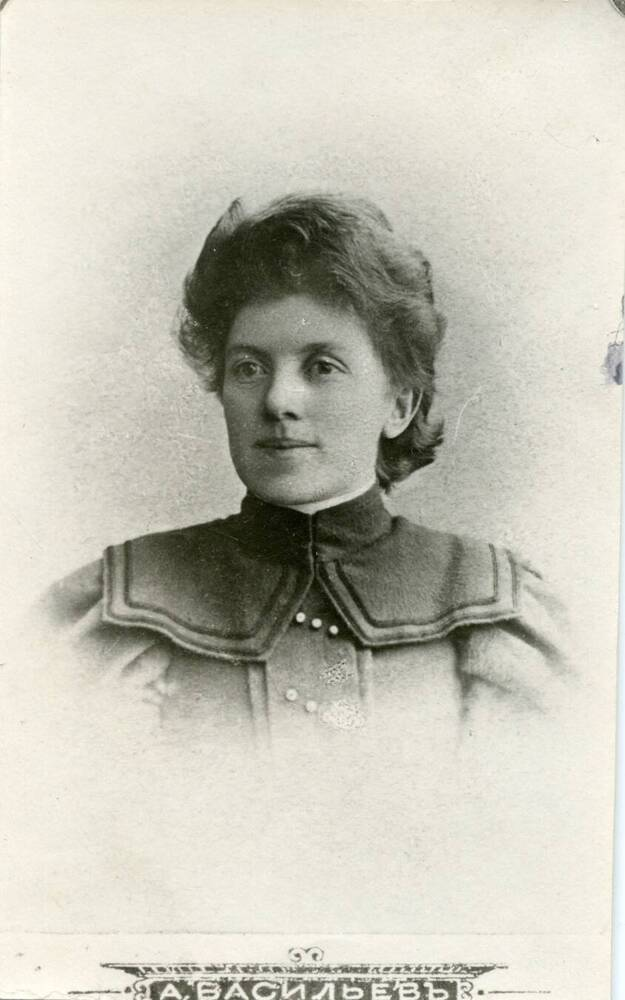
- Born: Maria Moiseevna Bercynska; 3 December 1872; Brest-Litovsk, Russian Empire
- Died: 4 February 1956) (aged 83); Moscow, Soviet Union
- Other name: Zverev
- Occupations: Bolshevik revolutionary, writer, editor and functionary
- Employer(s): Iskra; V.I. Lenin Georgian Polytechnical Institute; Council of People's Commissars of the Russian Soviet Federative Socialist Republic; People's Commissariat of Communication Routes of the Soviet Union; Goslitizdat; Lenin Institute; Communist Institute of Journalism
- Organization(s): Ural Group of Social Democrats; USSR Union of Writers
- Political party: Russian Social Democratic Labour Party; Communist Party of the Soviet Union

Maria Moiseevna Essen (Russian: Мария Моисеевна Эссен, née Bercynska, Russian: Берцинская, 3 December 1872 – 4 February 1956), also known by the pseudonym "Zverev", was a Russian Old Bolshevik revolutionary, writer and editor. She was a member of the Russian Social Democratic Labour Party (RSDLP) and served on the party central committee before holding posts as a functionary for the Communist Party of the Soviet Union (CPSU).

== Biography ==
Essen was born on 3 December 1872 in Brest-Litovsk, Russian Empire (now Brest, Belarus). She was from a Jewish family and her father was a railway employee.

Essen joined the revolutionary movement in the early nineties, agitating in Ekaterinoslav, Kyiv and Yekaterinburg. She operated under the pseudonym "Zverev."

Essen became a member of the Russian Social Democratic Labour Party (RSDLP) in 1898. Essen became a leader of the Ural Group of Social Democrats, which was successor to the Ural Workers' Union, and participated in illegal mayovka celebrations. Essen fled to Bishkil [ru], where she established the illegal underground printing house with N. N. Kudrin and worked writing and printing revolutionary proclamations.

Essen was arrested in June 1899 in connection with the Ural Group of Social Democrats/Ural Workers' Union. She was exiled to Yakutia for five years from 1901. In February 1902, she escaped from exile and fled abroad to Geneva, Switzerland, where she met Vladimir Lenin and joined his circle. She worked in Geneva on the editorial staff of Iskra (Spark), the newspaper of Russian socialist emigrants and official organ of the RSDLP.

In 1903, Essen attended the 2nd Congress of the Russian Social Democratic Labour Party, where she was elected to the Central Committee of the party.

In June and July 1904, Essen travelled with Lenin and his wife Nadezhda Krupskaya during a period of recuperation and hiking in Switzerland (after Lenin's publication the anti-Menshevik tract One Step Forward, Two Steps Back). She corresponded with Lenin on the state of affairs in the RSDLP, his anger at the Mensheviks and the need to prepare for an armed uprising.

In 1904, Essen was arrested again. In June 1905 she was deported to Arkhangelsk, sentenced to exile for five years. She escaped while being transported to her second exile. In 1907, she left the RSDLP.

In 1917, Essen was a Deputy of the Tiflis (now Tbilisi) Soviet, where she was part of the group of socialist democratic internationalists. She then joined the Communist Party of the Soviet Union (CPSU) in 1920 and held functionary posts in Transcaucasian Socialist Federative Soviet Republic. From 1923 to 1925, she served as rector of the V. I. Lenin Georgian Polytechnical Institute (now Georgian Technical University).

In 1925, Essen moved to Moscow and worked at the Council of People's Commissars of the Russian Soviet Federative Socialist Republic then for the People's Commissariat of Communication Routes of the Soviet Union.

From 1933 to 1941, Essen was a senior editor at the Gospolitizdat publishing house in Leningrad. Later in life she also worked at the Lenin Institute library and archive and for the Communist Institute of Journalism.

Essen retired in 1955 and died on 4 February 1956 in Moscow, Soviet Union.
