= Wilno Voivodeship =

Wilno Voivodeship may refer to:

- Vilnius Voivodeship, one of the historic voivodeships of the Grand Duchy of Lithuania, established in 1413
- Wilno Voivodeship (1926–1939), voivodeship of Poland from 1926 to 1939
