= 3rd Congress of the Russian Social Democratic Labour Party =

1905 meeting in London

- Host country: United Kingdom
- Date: April 25, 1905-May 10, 1905
- Cities: London
- Participants: Vladimir Lenin
- Follows: 2nd Congress (1903)
- Precedes: Tampere conference of 1905, 4th Congress (1906)

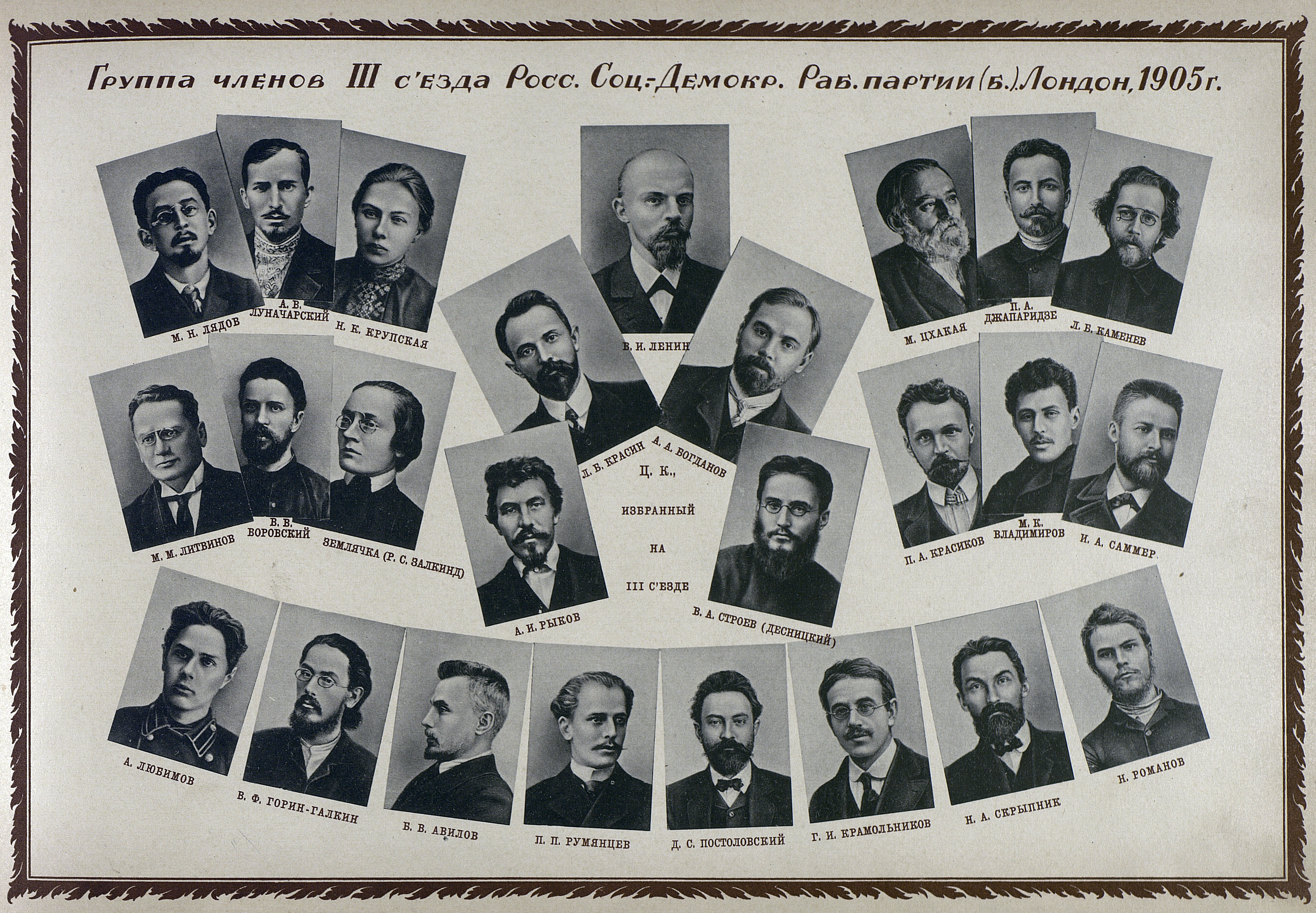
Participants of the 1905 congress. (note that V. F. Gorin-Galkin did not actually participate at the Congress)

The Third Congress of the Russian Social Democratic Labour Party (Russian: Российская социал-демократическая рабочая партия, РСДРП) was held during 25 April – 10 May [12–27 April O.S.] 1905 in London, England.

The Menshevik Central Committee had voted against calling the Congress on 7 February 1905 and voted to expel Lenin. Two days later nine of the eleven members of this committee were arrested. Leonid Krasin and Lyubimov initiated contact with the Bolsheviks and signed an agreement with Gusev and Rumyantsev for the setting up of the 3rd Congress.

It was the Congress of the Bolsheviks only with a handful of Mensheviks, who organised an alternative conference in Geneva. The meeting was so secretive that the name of the hall they used is still unknown. Krasin and Alexander Bogdanov were appointed to the "Russian Bureau of the Central Committee" charged with bringing together the two factions.

Besides the routine topics, the agenda included the issues of the Russian Revolution of 1905. Lenin wanted the party to support Japan in its war on Russia (Joseph Pilsudski used the same tactic). The Congress put pressure on Lenin to return to Russia (he did eventually in November) by relocating the central committee and party newspaper in Russia.

== Resolutions ==
- About constituting of the congress;
- About the armed uprising;
- About provisional revolutionary government;
- About relation to the government tactics before the coup-d'état;
- On the matter about the open political action of the RSDLP;
- About relation to the peasant movement;
- About the breakaway part of the Party;
- About relation to other national social-democratic organizations;
- About practical agreements with social revolutionaries;
- About relations to liberals;
- About propaganda and agitation;
- On the matter of events in the Russian Caucasus region;
- On the matter of events in the Russian Poland;
- About the Central body of the Party.

== See also ==
- Bolshevik Military Organizations
