= Arkadi Kremer =

Russian Bundist politician (1865–1935)

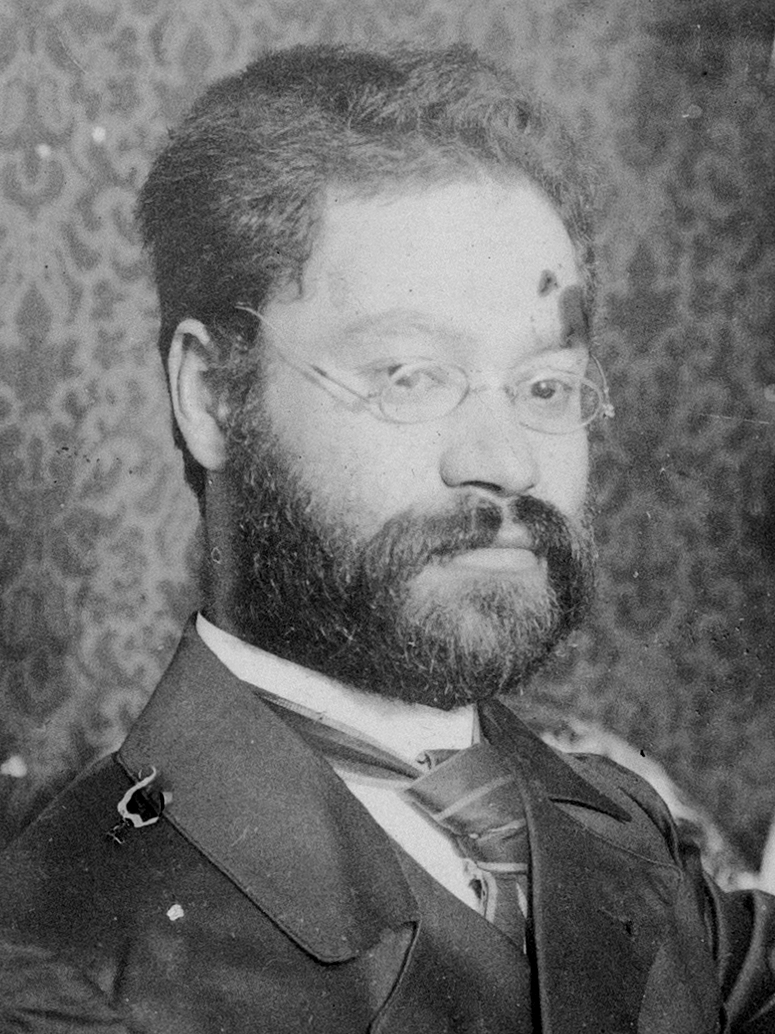
Kremer c. 1900

Arkadi Kremer (Yiddish: אַרקאַדי קרעמער; Russian: Арка́дий Кре́мер; born Aron Iosifovich Kremer, also known as Aleksandr Kremer, Solomon Kremer, and most frequently referred to as Arkady, his nickname; 1865–1935) was a Russian socialist leader known as the 'Father of the Bund' (the General Jewish Workers' Union in Lithuania, Poland and Russia). This organisation was instrumental in the development of Russian Marxism and the Jewish labour movement.

== Life and career ==
=== Early life ===
Arkadi Kremer was born in Švenčionys in Vilna Governorate, Russian Empire (in present-day Lithuania), into a religious maskilic family. At age 12 he moved to Vilna, where he attended Realschule (Secondary School). Kremer subsequently studied at the St. Petersburg Technological Institute and the Riga Polytechnic. In the course of his studies, Kremer became involved in radical student politics and became involved in the Polish Marxist organization 'Proletariat'. He was first arrested in 1889. After some time in prison he was condemned to administrative exile and banned from St. Petersburg. By 1889, he was engaging in revolutionary activity, which ultimately led him to be incarcerated and cut off from further studies. However, in 1890, he was released from jail and banned from Saint Petersburg. As a result, Arkady traveled back to Vilna to begin his revolutionary activity there by joining revolutionary circles of Jewish workers

=== Political career ===
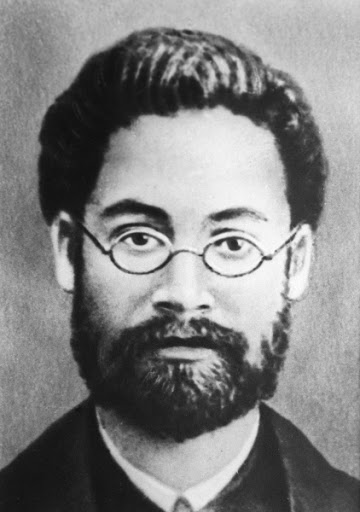
Kremer c. 1898

In Vilna, Kremer quickly became the acknowledged leader of the Vilna Group, a circle of Jewish Social-Democrats from which the Bund subsequently emerged. He aimed to expand the Jewish worker's influence in mass politics to end their struggle under capitalism led by the bourgeoisie. A part of this was the shift of language in the Vilna group from Russian to Yiddish, as 97% of Russian Jews spoke Yiddish as their first language, while only 25% were literate in Russian (according to the 1897 census). In 1897, Arkady created the General Jewish Labour Bund, which is commonly referred to as “the Bund” based on Marxist philosophies. He worked closely with Shmul Gozhansky, another revolutionary leader to change the Vilna Jewish workers circles tactics from propaganda to mass agitation. Propaganda was grounded in small scale group meetings of politically conscious workers circles, and Arkady aimed to expand the Bund to get involved in mass politics. Arkady aimed to improve Jewish worker's conditions. In the course of this struggle, they would develop a class consciousness and an understanding of the contradictions of capitalism, leading eventually to their political organization and to the overthrow of the capitalist system. Kremer argued for this tactic in the influential pamphlet On Agitation (Ob Agitatsii), produced in 1893, together with the future Menshevik leader Julius Martov. This was known as the 'Vilna Programme' and greatly influenced the Russian Marxist movement and young Marxists like Vladimir Lenin. His pamphlet harshly criticized capitalists for exploiting Jewish workers, and advocated for the destruction of capitalism. It promoted anti-capitalist and anti-zionist values.

At first, Kremer seems to have been inclined to favour economic over political agitation. As Jewish workers' circles proliferated in Russian, Lithuanian and Polish cities, some of Kremer's associates called for the creation of a unified Jewish Social-Democratic party. Kremer initially rejected this idea, believing that a political party would be the organic outcome of the workers' own economic struggle. The doyen of Russian Marxism, George Plekhanov, was instrumental in persuading Kremer to change his mind. The fact that Jewish workers in Russia would not be able to affiliate with international organisations such as the Second International unless they had a party seems to have weighed heavily with Kremer. Thus, in September 1897, Kremer and his comrades founded the General Jewish Workers' Union (Bund) in Vilna. Kremer was one of three members of its first Central Committee and was widely respected as the Bund's leader. The name hearkened back to Ferdinand Lassalle's General German Workers' Association (ADAV) of the 1860s, one of the forerunner organisations of the German Social-Democratic Party. At the same time, Kremer chose the name 'Bund' because it implied a looser federation than the term 'Party'. However, Kremer also maintained close contact with the wider Russian Social-Democratic movement. He placed less emphasis on Jewish cultural nationalism and autonomy than subsequent younger Bundist leaders like Mikhail Liber.

The Bund competed, on the one hand, with non-Marxist Jewish workers' groups influenced by Russian populism (such as Mark Natanson's 'Workers' Party for the Political Liberation of Russia', RPPOR, in Minsk), and, on the other hand, with labour Zionist organisation like Poale Zion. Although some younger Bundists were influenced by Zionism and the Bund insisted on its organisational autonomy and on Jewish cultural independence, the Bund rejected Jewish Zionists' 'national separatism' and the idea of establishing a Jewish state in Palestine.

In 1898, Kremer was instrumental in bringing together various Social-Democratic groups in the Russian empire and among Russian exiles abroad to form the Russian Social-Democratic Workers' Party (RSDRP). The Bund was one of the constituent organisations of the RSDRP, and in its own view, an autonomous organisation within the RSDRP. Kremer attended the RSDRP's founding congress in Minsk and was elected to its first, short-lived Central Committee (which also comprised three members). Before long, the committee, including Kremer, was arrested, leaving the young party in disarray. While in prison, Kremer put his technological and mathematical studies to use by developing a system of cryptography and a coding machine that came to be widely used in the Russian revolutionary movement.

Furthermore, the conflict over the expansion of the RSDLP was one of the first major controversies among Russian Social-Democrats. Kremer supported cultural autonomy for Jewish workers and organisational autonomy for the Bund within the RSDLP, a position the Bund also adopted at the RSDLP's Second Congress in 1903. In 1903, the Bund's position, most forcefully argued by Liber, was rejected by both Lenin and Martov, shortly to emerge as the leaders of the Bolshevik and Menshevik factions. The Bund, finding its claim to exclusive representation of Jewish workers in the Russian empire and organisational autonomy within a federally organised RSDRP rebuffed, withdrew from the Congress and from the RSDRP. This occurred before the split between Lenin and Martov over the question of party membership conditions and left Lenin with a slight majority at the Congress.

The Bolshevik Party, led by Vladimir Lenin split into two factions: those who agreed with Lenin's plans to keep the party as a small group of revolutionaries, and those who wished to expand, which were the Mensheviks. Many Bund members had aligning opinions with the Mensheviks, leading to lots of tension between the Bund and other political groups, such as the Jewish Zionists and the powerful Bolsheviks.

=== Later life and death ===
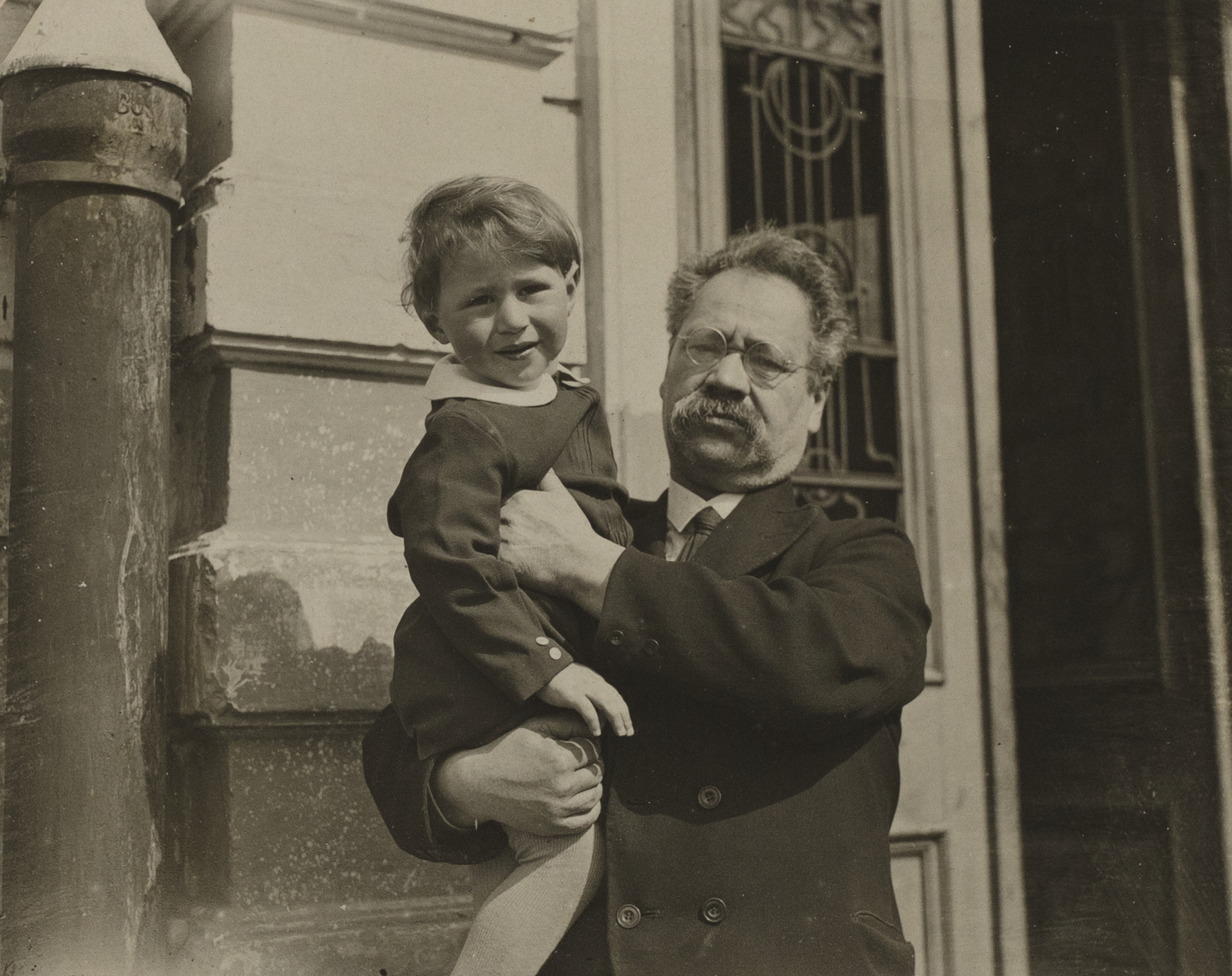
Kremer with his grandson, 1930

When the Revolution of 1905 broke out in Russia, Kremer returned to St. Petersburg and became involved in the St. Petersburg soviet. He was arrested again in 1907, as the Revolution was winding down and the Tsar reasserted control. Released in 1908, Kremer withdrew from political activity, though he remained associated with the Bund. In 1912 Kremer emigrated to France, where he served the Bund as a foreign representative and liaison with the French Socialists. Primarily, Kremer worked as an engineer. In the bitter controversies which divided the European socialist movement with the outbreak of World War I, Kremer played a minor role, though he seems to have sided with the supporters of the Entente. In 1921, Kremer returned to Vilna, then called Wilno in newly independent Poland. Kremer taught mathematics. During his Vilna years, Kremer met and married Pati Matle Srednitskaia (or Srednicki) (1867–1943), a revolutionary activist in her own right. He and his wife Pati remained active in the Bund. Arkadii Kremer died in 1935 and was buried with great honours by the Bundists. Pati Kremer survived until 1943. She was murdered by the Nazis when they liquidated the Wilno ghetto.

== Sources ==
- Arkadi: Zamlbukh tsum ondenk fun grinder fun 'Bund' Arkadi Kremer, 1865–1935. New York, 1942.
- Kremer, Arkadi, and Julius Martov. “On Agitation.” People’s War, December 9, 2020. https://pplswar.wordpress.com/2020/12/08/on-agitation-ob-agitatsii-arkadi-kremer-julius-martov/.
- Greenbaum, Alfred A. “Jewish Historiography in Soviet Russia.” Proceedings of the American Academy for Jewish Research 28 (1959): 57–76. https://doi.org/10.2307/3622447.
- Shukman, H, and H. Shukman. “The Relations between the Jewish Bund and the RSDRP, 1897-1903.” ORA, January 1, 1961. https://ora.ox.ac.uk/objects/uuid:90a098ef-91da-46b4-adf6-e337bed1d43c.
- YIVO | Kremer, Arkadii. Accessed December 9, 2023. https://yivoencyclopedia.org/article.aspx/Kremer_Arkadii.
