= 4th Congress of the Russian Social Democratic Labour Party =

1906 meeting in Stockholm

- Host country: Sweden
- Date: April 23, 1906-August 8, 1906
- Cities: Stockholm
- Participants: Vladimir Lenin
- Follows: 3rd Congress (1905), Tampere conference of 1905
- Precedes: 5th Congress (1907)

Bolshevik delegates at the 4th Congress of the RSDLP

Menshevik, Bundist, Polish Social Democratic and Latvian Social Democratic delegates at the 4th Congress

The Fourth (Unity) Congress of the Russian Social Democratic Labour Party (Russian: IV (объединительный) съезд Росси́йской социа́л-демократи́ческой рабо́чей па́ртии) took place in the (old) Folkets hus in Stockholm, Sweden, from 23 April to 8 May (O.S. 10-25 April) 1906. This Congress saw the formal, albeit short-lived, reconciliation between the Bolshevik and Menshevik factions, hence the word "Unity" in the Congress' name.

== Congress ==
The Congress was attended by 112 delegates with the right to vote, who represented 57 local Party organisations, and 22 delegates with voice but no vote. Other participants were delegates from various national Social-Democratic parties: three each from the Social-Democrats of Poland and Lithuania, the Bund, and the Latvian Social Democratic Workers' Party, one each from the Ukrainian Social-Democratic Labour Party and the Finnish Labour Party, and also a representative of the Bulgarian Social Democratic Workers' Party. Among the Bolshevik delegates were Vladimir Lenin, Alexander Bogdanov, Leonid Krasin, Mikhail Frunze, Mikhail Kalinin, Nadezhda Krupskaya, Anatoly Lunacharsky, Fyodor Sergeyev (Artyom), Stepan Shahumyan, Ivan Skvortsov-Stepanov, Joseph Stalin, Kliment Voroshilov, Maxim Litvinov and V. V. Vorovsky.

The main items on the Congress agenda were the agrarian question, an appraisal of the current situation and the class tasks of the proletariat, the attitude to the Duma, and organisational matters. There was a bitter controversy between the Bolsheviks and Mensheviks over every item. Lenin made reports and speeches on the agrarian question, the current situation, and tactics regarding the Duma elections, the armed uprising, and other questions. The preponderance of Mensheviks at the Congress, while slight, determined its character; the Congress adopted Menshevik resolutions on a number of questions (the agrarian programme, the attitude to the Duma, etc.). The Congress approved the first clause of the Rules concerning Party membership in the wording proposed by Lenin. It admitted the Social Democracy of the Kingdom of Poland and Lithuania, and the Latvian Social Democratic Workers' Party into the RSDLP, and predetermined the admission of the Bund.

The Congress elected the 4th Central Committee made up of three Bolsheviks (Vasily Desnitsky, Krasin and Rykov) and seven Mensheviks (Vladimir Rozanov, Viktor Krokhmal, Lyubov Radchenko, Pavel Kolokolnikov, Gorev, Khinchuk, Bakhmetyev), and a Menshevik editorial board of Central Body.
