= Russian Social Democratic Labour Party =

Political party in the Russian Empire (1898–1912)

Russian Social Democratic Labour Party Российская социал-демократическая рабочая партия
- Abbreviation: RSDLP; РСДРП
- Leaders: Vladimir Lenin (Note: Leader of the Bolshevik faction.); Julius Martov (Note: Leader of the Menshevik faction.)
- Central Committee: Variable
- Founders: Stepan Radchenko; Arkadi Kremer; Boris Eidelmann; Alexander Vannovsky; Pavlo Tuchapskyi; Natan Vigdorchik; Kazimierz Petrusewicz; Abram Mutnik; Shmuel Katz
- Founded: March 1898; 128 years ago
- Dissolved: 1912; 114 years ago (Note: The party split into the Bolshevik and Menshevik factions in 1903, with the two factions forming separate parties in 1912. However, joint party organisations continued to exist until 1917.)
- Merger of: LSEWC; Emancipation of Labour; Jewish Labour Bund
- Succeeded by: RSDLP (Bolsheviks); RSDLP (Mensheviks)
- Newspaper: Iskra (official organ)
- Ideology: Socialism; Marxism; Factions: Bolshevism; Menshevism
- Political position: Far-left
- International affiliation: Socialist International
- Colours: Red (official)
- Anthem: "Интернациона́л" (Note: Russian: Интернациона́л, romanized: Internatsionál) ('The Internationale')
- Most MPs (1907): 65 / 518 (13%)

Party flag

The Russian Social Democratic Labour Party (RSDLP), (Note: Russian: Российская социал-демократическая рабочая партия (РСДРП), romanized: Rossiyskaya sotsial-demokraticheskaya rabochaya partiya (RSDRP), IPA: [rɐˈsʲijskəjə sətsɨˌal‿dʲɪməkrɐˈtʲitɕɪskəjə rɐˈbotɕɪjə ˈpartʲɪjə (ˈɛr‿ɛz‿dɛ‿ɛr‿pɛ)]) also known as the Russian Social Democratic Workers' Party (RSDWP) or the Russian Social Democratic Party (RSDP), was a socialist political party founded in 1898 in Minsk, Russian Empire. The party emerged from the merger of various Marxist groups operating under Tsarist repression, and was dedicated to the overthrow of the autocracy and the establishment of a socialist state based on the revolutionary leadership of the Russian proletariat.

The RSDLP's formative years were marked by ideological and strategic disputes culminating at its Second Congress in 1903, where the party split into two main factions: the Bolsheviks, led by Vladimir Lenin, who advocated a tightly organized vanguard of professional revolutionaries; and the Mensheviks, led by Julius Martov and others, who favored a more moderate, broad-based model. During and in the years after the 1905 Revolution, the RSDLP operated both legally and underground, publishing newspapers, infiltrating trade unions, and agitating among industrial workers.

Despite repeated attempts at reunification, the rift between the Bolsheviks and Mensheviks widened, resulting in a formal split in 1912. The February Revolution of 1917 saw some Mensheviks support cooperation with the Provisional Government, which the Bolsheviks opposed in favor of "all power to the soviets". After the Bolsheviks seized power in the October Revolution later that year, the RSDLP was effectively dissolved. In 1918, the Bolshevik party formally renamed itself the Russian Communist Party (Bolsheviks), which later became the Communist Party of the Soviet Union.

== History ==
=== Origins and early activities ===
The RSDLP was not the first Russian Marxist group; the Emancipation of Labour group had been formed in 1883. The RSDLP was created to oppose the revolutionary populism of the Narodniks, which was later represented by the Socialist Revolutionary Party (SRs). The RSDLP was formed at an underground conference in Minsk in March 1898. There were nine delegates: from the Jewish Labour Bund, and from the Robochaya Gazeta ("Workers' Newspaper") in Kiev, both formed a year earlier in 1897; and the League of Struggle for the Emancipation of the Working Class in Saint Petersburg. Some additional social democrats from Moscow and Yekaterinburg also attended. The RSDLP program was based strictly on the theories of Karl Marx and Friedrich Engels. Specifically, that despite Russia's agrarian nature at the time, the true revolutionary potential lay with the industrial working class. At this time, there were three million Russian industrial workers, just 3% of the population. The RSDLP was illegal for most of its existence. Within a month after the Congress, five of the nine delegates were arrested by the Okhrana (imperial secret police).

Members of the RSDLP became popularly labelled as esdeki (Russian: эсдеки, singular: Russian: эсдек, romanized: esdek) - from the Russian-language names of the initial letters S (Russian: С) and D (Russian: Д) standing for "Social Democrats" (Russian: социал-демократы, romanized: sotsial-demokraty).

Before the 2nd Party Congress in 1903, a young intellectual named Vladimir Ilyich Ulyanov (better known by his pseudonym, Vladimir Lenin) joined the party. In 1902, he had published What Is To Be Done?, outlining his view of the party's proper task and methodology: to form "the vanguard of the proletariat". He advocated a disciplined, centralized party of committed activists who would fuse the underground struggle for political freedom with the class struggle of the proletariat.

=== Internal divisions ===
In 1903, the 2nd Party Congress met in exile in Brussels to attempt to create a united force. However, after unprecedented attention from the Belgian authorities the Congress moved to London, meeting on 11 August in Charlotte Street. At the Congress, the party split into two irreconcilable factions on 17 November: the Bolsheviks (derived from bolshinstvo—Russian for "majority"), headed by Lenin; and the Mensheviks (from menshinstvo—Russian for "minority"), headed by Julius Martov. Confusingly, the Mensheviks were actually the larger faction, but the names Menshevik and Bolshevik were taken from a vote held at the 1903 Party Congress for the editorial board of the party newspaper, Iskra (Spark), with the Bolsheviks being the majority and the Mensheviks being the minority. These were the names used by the factions for the rest of the party Congress and these are the names retained after the split at the 1903 Congress. Lenin's faction later ended up in the minority and remained smaller than the Mensheviks until the Russian Revolution.

A central issue at the Congress was the question of the definition of party membership. Martov proposed that a member of the Russian Social Democratic Labour Party was "one who accepts its program and supports it both materially and by regular cooperation under the leadership of one of its organizations." On the other hand, Lenin proposed a stricter definition that a member of the Russian Social-Democratic Labour Party was "one who recognizes the Party's program and supports it by material means and by personal participation in one of the Party's organizations". Martov's big tent definition of party membership initially won the vote 28–23. However, his majority was short-lived, given the exit from the party, for separate reasons, of its Bundist and Economist members who had supported his definition. That left in the majority those in favour of Lenin's definition of party members as, in effect, professional revolutionaries- centrally directed, tightly disciplined, and therefore capable of operating effectively in the tsarist police state. From this was derived the faction names: "Majority" ("Bolshevik") and "Minority" ("Menshevik").

Despite a number of attempts at reunification, the split proved permanent. As time passed, ideological differences emerged in addition to the original organizational differences. The main difference that emerged in the years after 1903 was that the Bolsheviks believed that only the workers, backed up by the peasantry, could carry out the bourgeois-democratic revolutionary tasks in Russia, which would then provide incentive to socialist revolution in Germany, France and Britain, while the Mensheviks believed that the workers and peasants must seek out enlightened people from the liberal bourgeoisie to carry out the bourgeois-democratic revolutionary tasks in Russia. The two warring factions both agreed that the coming revolution would be "bourgeois-democratic" within Russia, but while the Mensheviks viewed the liberals as the main ally in this task, the Bolsheviks opted for an alliance with the peasantry as the only way to carry out the bourgeois-democratic revolutionary tasks while defending the interests of the working class. Essentially, the difference was that the Bolsheviks considered that in Russia the tasks of the bourgeois democratic revolution would have to be carried out without the participation of the bourgeoisie. The 3rd Party Congress was held separately by the Bolsheviks.

The 4th Party Congress was held in Stockholm, Sweden, in 1906, and saw a formal reunification of the two factions (with the Mensheviks in the majority), but the discrepancies between Bolshevik and Menshevik views became particularly clear during the proceedings.

The 5th Party Congress was held in London, England, in 1907. It consolidated the supremacy of the Bolshevik faction and debated strategy for communist revolution in Russia.

A subfaction led by Alexander Bogdanov called Vpered would split away from the Bolsheviks in 1909.

=== 1912 split ===
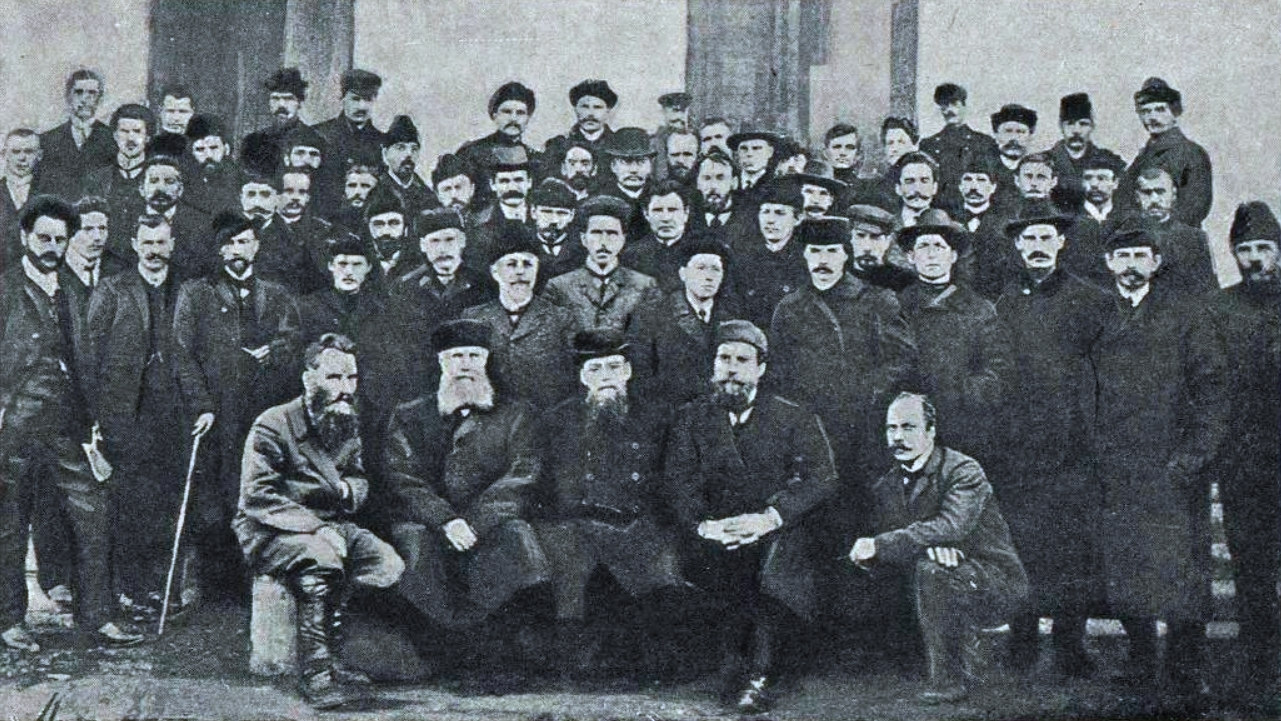
Elected Social Democrats in the Second Duma election of 1907

The Social Democrats (SDs) boycotted elections to the First Duma (April–July 1906), but they were represented in the Second Duma (February–June 1907). With the SRs, they held 83 seats. The Second Duma was dissolved on the pretext of the discovery of an SD conspiracy to subvert the army. Under new electoral laws, the SD presence in the Third Duma (1907–1912) was reduced to 19. From the Fourth Duma (1912–1917), the SDs were finally and fully split. The Mensheviks had seven members in the Duma and the Bolsheviks had six, including Roman Malinovsky, who was later uncovered as an Okhrana agent.

In the years of Tsarist repression that followed the defeat of the 1905 Russian Revolution, both the Bolshevik and Menshevik factions faced splits, causing further splits in the RSDLP, which manifested themselves from late 1908 and the years immediately following. The Mensheviks split into the "Pro-Party Mensheviks" led by Georgi Plekhanov, who wished to maintain illegal underground work as well as legal work; and the "Liquidators", whose most prominent advocates were Pavel Axelrod, Fyodor Dan, Nikolai Aleksandrovich Rozhkov and Nikolay Chkheidze, who wished to pursue purely legal activities and who now repudiated illegal and underground work. The Menshevik Julius Martov was formally also considered a liquidator, partly because most of his closest political allies were part of the liquidator subfaction.

The Bolsheviks split three ways into the Proletary group led by Lenin, Grigory Zinoviev and Lev Kamenev, who waged a fierce struggle against the liquidators, ultimatists and recallists; the Ultimatist group led by Grigory Aleksinsky, who wished to issue ultimatums to the RSDLP Duma deputies to follow the party line or to resign immediately; and the Recallist group led by Alexander Bogdanov and Anatoly Lunacharsky with support from Maxim Gorky, who called for the immediate recall of all RSDLP Duma deputies and a boycott of all legal work by the RSDLP, in favour of increased radical underground and illegal work.

There was also a non-faction group led by Leon Trotsky, who denounced all the "factionalism" in the RSDLP, pushed for "unity" in the party and focused more strongly on the problems of Russian workers and peasants on the ground.

In January 1912, Lenin's Proletary Bolshevik group called a conference in Prague and expelled the liquidators, ultimatists and recallists from the RSDLP, which officially led to the creation of a separate party, known as the Russian Social Democratic Labour Party (Bolsheviks), while the Mensheviks continued their activities establishing the Russian Social Democratic Labour Party (Mensheviks). In August 1912, Trotsky's group tried to reunite all the RSDLP factions into the same party at a conference in Vienna, but he was largely rebuffed by the Bolsheviks. The Bolsheviks seized power during the October Revolution in 1917 when all political power was transferred to the soviets and in 1918 changed their name to the Russian Communist Party. They later banned the Mensheviks after the Kronstadt rebellion of 1921.

The Interdistrictites, known as the Russian Social Democratic Labour Party (Internationalists), emerged in 1913 as another faction originating from the RSDLP.

== Party branches ==
=== Estonia ===
In 1902, the Tallinn organization of the RSDLP was founded, which in 1904 was converted into the Tallinn Committee of the party. In November, a parallel (that is, also directly under the CC of RSDLP) Narva Committee was created. Amongst other radicals, the Estonian RSDLP cadres were active in the 1905 Revolution. At the conference of the Estonian RSDLP organizations in Terijoki, Finland in March 1907, the Bolshevik supporters came into serious conflict with the Mensheviks.

=== Livonia ===
At the 4th (Unity) Congress of the RSDLP in 1906, the Latvian Social Democratic Workers Party entered the RSDLP as a territorial organisation. After the Congress, its name was changed Social-Democracy of the Latvian Territory.

== Congresses ==
List of congresses of the Russian Social Democratic Labour Party from 1898–1907.
Congress		Location	Delegates (Note: Also known as representatives.)	Elected to Central Committee	Majority Faction
1st	13 March – 15 March 1898	Minsk, Russian Empire	9	Stepan Radchenko; Boris Eidelmann; Arkadi Kremer	—N/a
2nd	30 July – 23 August 1903	Brussels, Belgium (Note: Thirteen sessions of the second congress took place in Brussels before it was moved to London.); London, United Kingdom	51	Gleb Krzhizhanovsky; Friedrich Lengnik; Vladimir Noskov	Mensheviks
3rd	25 April – 10 May 1905	London, United Kingdom	51	Leonid Krasin; Vladimir Lenin; Dmitry Postolovsky; Alexei Rykov	Bolsheviks
4th	10 April – 25 April 1906	Stockholm, Sweden	112	Boris Bakhmeteff; Leon Goldman; Vasily Denitsky; Pavel Kolokolnikov; Leonid Krasin; Viktor Krokhmal; Natalya Baranskaya; Vladimir Rozanov; Alexei Rykov; Lev Khinchuk	Mensheviks
5th	13 May – 1 June 1907	London, United Kingdom	338	Jūlijs Daniševskis; Iosif Dubrovinsky; Felix Dzerzhinsky; Joseph Goldenberg; Joseph Iusiv; Aleksandr Martynov; Viktor Nogin; Nikolai Rozhkov; Ivan Teodorovich; Adolf Warski; Noe Zhordania	Bolsheviks

== Electoral history ==
=== Legislative elections ===
State Duma
Year	Votes	%	Seat(s)	+/–	Leader
1906	Unknown (3rd)	3.8	18 / 478	New	Julius Martov
Jan, 1907	Unknown (3rd)	12.5	65 / 518	▲47	Julius Martov
Oct, 1907	Unknown (4th)	3.7	19 / 442	▼46	Julius Martov
1912	Unknown (4th)	3.3	14 / 442	▼5	Julius Martov

== See also ==
- Outline of the Russian Revolution and Civil War
- Bibliography of the Russian Revolution and Civil War
- Bibliography of Stalinism and the Soviet Union
- Index of Old Bolsheviks
- Index of articles related to the Russian Revolution and Civil War
- Factions of the Russian Social Democratic Labour Party
- Socialist Revolutionary Party
- Zreniye
