= Russian Machism =

Political philosophy

Russian Machism was a term applied to a variety of political/philosophical viewpoints which emerged in Imperial Russia in the beginning of the twentieth century before the Russian Revolution. They shared an interest in the scientific and philosophical insights of Ernst Mach. Many, but not all, of the Russian Machists were Marxists, and some viewed Machism as an essential ingredient of a materialist outlook on the world. The term came into use around 1905, primarily as a polemical expression used by Lenin and Georgi Plekhanov. With a shared desire to defend an "orthodox" account of Marxism, from their own differing perspective they both divided the opponents of this putative orthodoxy into the "idealists" and the "Machists". The term remained a signifier of Marxist-Leninist opprobrium from the 1920s through into the 1970s. This was shown by Alexander Maximov's use of the term to criticize Boris Hessen in 1928. It can also be seen in Evald Ilyenkov's chapter on "Marxism against Machism as the Philosophy of Lifeless Reaction" in Leninist Dialectics and the Metaphysics of Positivism (1979).

== Confrontation with idealism ==
In 1902 Pavel Ivanovich Novgorodtsev edited the book Problems of Idealism (Problemy Idealizma) which included contributions from Sergei Bulgakov, Evgenii Nikolaevitch Troubetzkoy, Sergei Nikolaevich Trubetskoy, Peter Berngardovich Struve, Nikolai Berdyaev, Semyon Frank, Sergei Askol'dov, Bogdan Kistyakovski, Alexander Sergeyevich Lappo-Danilevsky, Sergey Oldenburg, and Zhukovsky. In proclaiming the advent of a new idealist movement he also derided positivism as being narrow and dogmatic.

Lenin, who was a materialist, explains the difference between philosophical idealism and philosophical materialism as follows: "Materialism is the recognition of 'objects in themselves' or objects outside the mind; the ideas and sensations are copies or images of these objects. The opposite doctrine (idealism) says: the objects do not exist, outside the mind…”

== Confrontation with Lenin ==
The publication of Studies in the Philosophy of Marxism (Russian: Очерки по философии Марксизма) in 1908 marked a key moment in the emergence of this Russian Machism. However whilst many of the proponents of Russian Machism saw it as adding important insights to what a materialist view of the world would look like, Vladimir Lenin was a consistent opponent, writing Materialism and Empirio-criticism to refute their ideas. Lenin cited as supporters of Machism: Vladimir Bazarov, Alexander Bogdanov, Anatoly Lunacharsky, Jakov Berman, Osip Gelfond, Pavel Yushkevich, Sergei Suvorov and Nikolai Valentinov.

His main criticisms were that Mach's philosophy led to solipsism and to the absurd conclusion that nature did not exist before humans:

If bodies are "complexes of sensations," as Mach says, or "combinations of sensations," as Berkeley said, it inevitably follows that the whole world is but my idea. Starting from such a premise it is impossible to arrive at the existence of other people besides oneself: it is the purest solipsism. ...if [Mach] does not admit that the "sensible content" is an objective reality, existing independently of us, there remains only a "naked abstract" I, an I infallibly written with a capital letter and italicised, equal to "the insane piano, which imagined that it was the sole existing thing in this world." If the "sensible content" of our sensations is not the external world, then nothing exists save this naked I engaged in empty "philosophical" acrobatics.

— Chapter 1.1, "Sensations and Complexes of Sensations"

Lenin also accused Mach of plagiarising the views of George Berkeley on this basis:

It is a sheer plagiarism on Berkeley. Not a single idea, not a glimmer of thought, except that “we sense only our sensations.” From which there is only one possible inference, namely, that the “world consists only of my sensations.” .... For if the “assumption” of the existence of the external world is “idle,” if the assumption that the needle exists independently of me and that an interaction takes place between my body and the point of the needle is really “idle and superfluous,” then primarily the “assumption” of the existence of other people is idle and superfluous. Only I exist, and all other people, as well as the external world, come under the category of idle “nuclei.” Holding this point of view one cannot speak of “our” sensations; and when Mach does speak of them, it is only a betrayal of his own amazing half-heartedness. It only proves that his philosophy is a jumble of idle and empty words in which their author himself does not believe.

— Chapter 1.1, "Sensations and Complexes of Sensations"

== Prominent Russian "Machists" ==
This list includes people who at one time or other have been described as Russian Machists:

- Vladimir Bazarov
- Jakov Berman
- Alexander Bogdanov
- Osip Gelfond
- Boris Hessen
- Sergei Suvorov
- Nikolai Valentinov
- Pavel Yushkevich

== See also ==
- Materialism and Empirio-criticism
- Positivism in Poland
