= Studies in the Philosophy of Marxism =

Anthology by Russian social democratic machists

Studies in the Philosophy of Marxism (Russian: Очерки по философии марксизма) was an account of a seminar held by Vladimir Bazarov, Alexander Bogdanov, Anatoly Lunacharsky, Jakov Berman, Osip Gelfond, Pavel Yushkevich and Sergey Suvorov published in St Petersburg in 1908.

== Contents ==
The articles were not connected by a single comprehensive philosophical “system”.

=== IV "Modern energy from the point of view of empiriosymbolism" ===
Yushkevich argued that human cognition was the “inseparable connection of the real and the ideal, the given and the created, the factual and the symbolical". Like Bogdanov, he viewed the meaning of a concept as lying not in perceived objects, but in human experience. He argued that sensual data do not exist in isolation, but rather their mutual dependency provides a context for their relations and connections with one another. Thus the scientific process of cognition emerges from transition from simpler to more complex and abstract empiriosymbols, i.e. from symbol-copies to symbols as conventional signs.

=== VII "Foundations of Social Philosophy" ===
The last article was by Suvorov where he develops a Real-monistic philosophy:

“In the gradation of the laws that regulate the world process, the particular and complex become reduced to the general and simple, and all of them are subordinate to the universal law of development—the law of the economy of forces. The essence of this law is that every system of forces is the more capable of conservation and development the less its expenditure, the greater its accumulation and the more effectively expenditure serves accumulation. The forms of mobile equilibrium, which long ago evoked the idea of objective expediency (the solar system, the cycle of terrestrial phenomena, the process of life), arise and develop by virtue of the conservation and accumulation of the energy inherent in them—by virtue of their intrinsic economy. The law of economy of forces is the unifying and regulating principle of all development—inorganic, biological and social.”
