= Nikolai Valentinov =

Russian academic and politician (1880–1964)

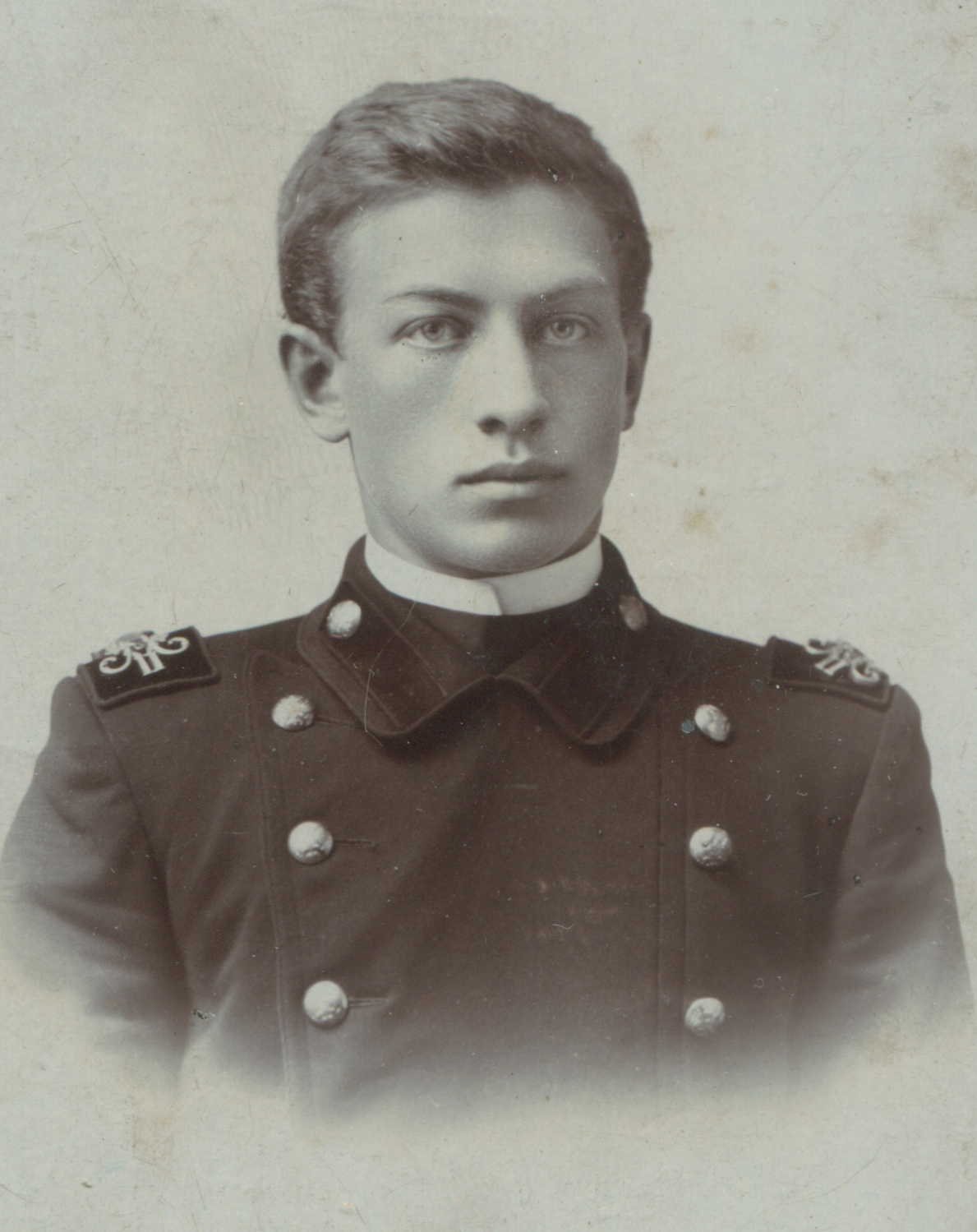
- Valentinov in 1901
- Born: 19 May 1880; Morshansk, Tambov Governorate, Russian Empire
- Died: 26 July 1964 (aged 84); Paris, France
- Citizenship: Russian Empire (1880–1917); RSFSR (1917–1930); France (1930–1964)
- Occupations: Philosopher, journalist, economist

Nikolai Vladislavovich Valentinov (Russian: Николай Владиславович Валентинов; 18 May 1880 – 26 July 1964) was a Russian philosopher, journalist and economist. A member of the Russian Social Democratic Workers' Party (RSDRP), he was an exponent of empirio-criticism. He was also known as Nikolai Valentinov-Volski and, later, as E. Yurevski.

== Biography ==
=== Early years ===
Nikolai Vladislavovich Volski was born in Morshansk, in the Tambov Governorate of the Russian Empire, in 1879. His family was of Lithuanian origin.

As a student at the St. Petersburg Technological Institute, Volski became involved in the revolutionary movement. At first he sympathised with the Narodniki (populists) and became affiliated with some of the early Socialist-Revolutionary circles. Later he discovered Marxism and became involved in the Social-Democratic party.

In 1898, Volski was arrested and banished to Ufa. In 1900, after his release, he moved to Kiev, where he attended the Polytechnic and resumed his revolutionary activities. He also met his future wife Valentina there; in her honour he came to use the pseudonym 'Nikolai Valentinov'. During these years, Valentinov-Volski undertook a thorough study of Marxism, reading Karl Marx' magnum opus Capital and writings by Georgi Plekhanov and Vladimir Lenin. He also took an interest in contemporary philosophy of science, especially in the empirio-criticism and empirio-monist theories of Ernst Mach and Richard Avenarius.

=== Bolshevik activist ===
Valentinov played an active part in the student revolutionary movement and was arrested several times. In 1902, he received a serious head wound, which almost killed him, during a demonstration. In 1903, after his release from yet another term of imprisonment, he went into exile to Switzerland. In Geneva, he associated with Lenin. Under Lenin's influence, Valentinov joined the Bolshevik wing of the Russian Social-Democratic Workers' Party (RSDRP) after the party's split at its second congress in 1903. Valentinov later recounted his time with Lenin in his 1953 book entitled My Encounters with Lenin.

Valentinov had been attracted to Lenin because of the latter's pamphlet What Is To Be Done? (1902), whose vision of a network of working-class activists, skilled at the art of evading police, appealed to the former sympathizer of Narodnaya Volya. However, Valentinov soon came into conflict with Lenin, particularly with respect to philosophical issues. Valentinov set out to combine Marxism with the empirio-criticism philosophy of Mach and Avenarius. He was not unique in this; Machism was a popular current in the Russian, German and Austrian socialist movements of the period: The Russian Bolsheviks Alexander Bogdanov and Anatoly Lunacharsky, the Socialist-Revolutionaries Viktor Chernov and Nikolai Avksentiev and the Austro-Marxist Friedrich Adler were Russian machists strongly influenced by empirio-criticism.

Valentinov claimed Lenin was not so much an orthodox Marxist as a materialist influenced by Nikolay Chernyshevsky. This, Valentinov maintained, was behind Lenin's utter rejection empirio-criticism as a form of subjective idealism. Valentinov objected to this critique, since in his view empirio-criticism was designed to overcome the metaphysical dichotomy of idealism and realism. For Lenin, the dispute had not merely philosophical but political implications: empirio-criticism was a form of petty bourgeois ideology that not only threatened the philosophical purity of Marxism but would also, in time, reveal its objectively counterrevolutionary political consequences.

Valentinov considered Lenin's position dogmatic, unscientific and based on an inadequate understanding of philosophy. Relations soon deteriorated. In 1905, Valentinov returned illegally to Russia and defected to the Menshevik faction of the RSDRP. Valentinov had laid out his philosophy in the book Ernst Mach and Marxism (1907). Lenin wrote a long polemic, Materialism and Empirio-criticism (1908), against what he considered the baleful influence of empirio-criticism on the revolutionary movement. Valentinov, along with Bogdanov and Lunacharski, was one of his targets.

Valentinov countered with the book The Philosophical Conceptions of Marxism (1908). In this work he rejected the charge of idealism and, in his various philosophical writings, went out of his way to criticise former Marxists like Sergei Bulgakov and Petr Struve, who had embraced idealist philosophies.

=== Post-Bolshevik activities ===
During the abortive Revolution of 1905, Valentinov worked for the Ukrainian Menshevik party in various capacities but played a minor role in the political events of the day. He concentrated primarily on journalism, contributing to such papers as Russkoe Slovo (Russian Word) and Kievskaya Mysl (where Leon Trotsky was one of his colleagues). Valentinov published his articles under various pseudonyms. He adopted a moderate Internationalist position during the First World War. He welcomed the Revolution of 1917 but gradually grew disillusioned with Kerenski's provisional government and the Menshevik/SR leaders of the soviets.

After the October Revolution, Valentinov left the Menshevik party. He was appointed as a 'non-party specialist' to the Supreme Economic Council of Soviet Russia (Vesenkha), and was one of the architects of the New Economic Policy (NEP) after the Russian Civil War. He also founded the journal Torgovo-Promyshlennaya Gazeta (Commercial-Industrial Gazette). During those years he collaborated closely with Nikolai Bukharin.

After Lenin's death in 1924, Valentinov found his position in Soviet Russia increasingly precarious. He watched the rise of Joseph Stalin with alarm and firmly opposed moves to abandon the NEP in favour of a programme of rapid industrialisation and collectivisation of agriculture.

As one of the most ardent defenders of the NEP, Valentinov felt that his life was in danger when Stalin decided definitively to abandon the NEP. In 1928, he fled from the Soviet Union and settled in Paris. He contributed to various émigré journals, now generally using the pseudonym 'E. Yurevski', and reconnected with the Menshevik exiles. Valentinov survived the Second World War in Paris.

Valentinov was frequently consulted by scholars (e.g., Leopold Haimson) on the early history of the Russian revolutionary movement and the Soviet Union. In the 1950s and '60s, Valentinov authored and edited various books on historical, philosophical, literary and economic subjects, including: My Encounters with Lenin (1953), Two Years with the Symbolists (1969), The Early Years of Lenin (1969) and The New Economic Policy and the Party Crisis after the Death of Lenin (1971). Several of these works appeared posthumously, as Nikolai Valentinov died in Paris on 26 August 1964.
