= Jacob Berman =

Jacob Berman and Jake Berman may refer to:

- Jakov Berman (1868–1933), Russian philosopher
- Jakub Berman (1901–1984), Communist politician in Poland
- Jake Berman (character), fictional character on the soap opera The Edge of Night
