= Vladimir Bazarov =

Russian revolutionary, journalist and economist (1874–1939)

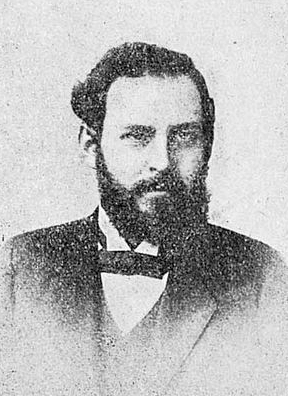
Vladimir Alexandrovich Bazarov, 1901

Vladimir Alexandrovich Bazarov (Russian: Влади́мир Алекса́ндрович База́ров; 8 August [O. S. 27 July] 1874 – 16 September 1939) was a Russian Marxist revolutionary, journalist, philosopher, and economist. Born as Vladimir Alexandrovich Rudnev, Bazarov is best remembered as a pioneer in the development of economic planning in the Soviet Union. He was one of the Russian Machists, as Lenin dubbed the term, and was a close friend to Alexander Bogdanov.

== Early career ==
=== Early years ===
Vladimir Alexandrovich Rudnev was born on 8 August 1874 (N.S.) in Tula, Russian Empire.

The son of a doctor and nobleman, A. M. Rudnev, he enrolled in the Tula classical gimnazija (high school) in 1884, and graduated in the spring of 1892.

In the autumn of 1892, Rudnev enrolled in the faculty of natural sciences of Moscow University. He became involved in revolutionary politics in 1896, activity which would lead to his expulsion from Moscow the following year. He also adopted the surname "Bazarov" as an underground revolutionary pseudonym taking it from the Russian nihilist character in Turgenev's Fathers and Sons. Thereafter, Bazarov returned home to Tula where, together with Alexander Bogdanov and Ivan Skvortsov-Stepanov, Bazarov organized a secret school for Tula workers. Bogdanov resided at the house of Bazarov's father and met his wife who worked for Alexander Rudenev. A guiding principle of this group was that the workers' movement should be led by workers themselves, assisted by educated members of the radical intelligentsia.

== In exile ==
Bazarov was expelled from Tula in 1899 and emigrated to Germany, settling in Berlin. In the fall of 1900, Bazarov was instrumental in establishing a political organization called the "Neutral Group of Social-Democrats in Berlin." This organization dedicated itself to helping heal the split between the Union of Russian Social-Democrats Abroad, publishers of Rabochee Delo (The Workers' Cause), and the Emancipation of Labor Group, publishers of Iskra (The Spark). According to Bazarov, the Berlin group sent representatives to Geneva in an attempt to broker a reconciliation between these two groups of Marxist revolutionaries. Bazarov's Berlin group issued three or four political proclamations before disbanding in the summer of 1901.

== Return to Russia ==
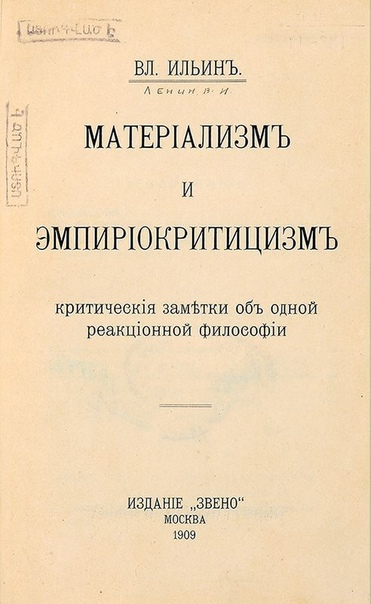
Cover of the first edition of Lenin's Materialism and Empirio-Criticism: Critical Notes about One Reactionary Philosophy, published in 1909 against Alexander Bogdanov, Nikolai Valentinov, Vladimir Bazarov, and their co-thinkers.

In the fall of 1901, Bazarov returned to Russia to serve as a member of the Moscow Social Democratic Committee. He was soon again arrested for his political activity, however, this time to be exiled for three years to Siberia. In 1904, Bazarov joined the Bolshevik faction of the Russian Social Democratic Labor Party (RSDLP), an organization headed by V.I. Lenin. He returned to St Petersburg when his term of exile was over, and was a member of the Bolsheviks' Petersburg committee. In 1905–07, Bazarov wrote extensively for the Bolshevik party press, serving on the editorial board of the grouping's primary newspaper, Rabochii put' (The Workers' Path), and sitting as a member of the party's underground leadership in the country, the so-called "Bolshevik Center."

Also in this period Bazarov joined with his old Tula comrades Ivan Skvortsov-Stepanov and Alexander Bogdanov in retranslating and publishing a new Russian-language edition of the three volumes of Capital by Karl Marx. This edition of the book gained recognition as the basic Russian translation and was reissued for decades in the Soviet Union, although for political reasons any mention of the participation of Bazarov and Bogdanov in the translation was later avoided.

Bazarov also became interested in philosophy during the first decade of the 20th century, coming to reject Marx's formulaic dialectical materialism in favor of the use of the scientific method to observe and theorize about human behavior, as espoused by the Austrian Ernst Mach and the German-Swiss philosopher Richard Avenarius. The Bolshevik supporters of the "empirical-criticism" of Mach and Avenarius, including Bazarov, Bogdanov, and Nikolai Valentinov, were soon the target of a bitter polemic by Lenin published in 1909, Materialism and Empirio-criticism. This dispute created a rift with Lenin. In May 1908, Bazarov and Bogdanov were in Capri, as guests of the writer Maxim Gorky, who prevailed upon Lenin to join them, in the hope of brokering a reconciliation. The attempt failed. Lenin told them: "We will simply have to separate for two or three years." Bazarov continued to be an active Marxist, without being a member of either of the rival factions, the Bolsheviks or Mensheviks.

In 1911, Bazarov was arrested once again and was deported once more, this time a three-year sentence to Astrakhan. In November 1912, Bazarov joined with Bogdanov, Anatoly Lunacharsky, Gorky, and Lenin, writing for a new paper in St. Petersburg called Pravda.

During the years of World War I, Bazarov wrote for various radical publications, including Gorky's radical daily, Novaya zhizn' (New Life).

== After the 1917 revolution ==
Following the October Revolution of 1917, Bazarov moved to Kharkov in Ukraine, where he wrote for various Menshevik publications. In 1919 he published Na puti k sotsializmu (Khar'kov, 1919), for which he was attacked by Bukharin, who viewed him and Bogdanov as being part of a combined opposition espousing a theory of a "bureaucratic degeneration (the technico-intellectual bureaucracy, the 'organizing' caste)".

In 1922, Bazarov joined the staff of the State Planning Commission, where he met Vladimir Groman, with whom he would work intimately for the next half decade. Bazarov and Groman worked together developing the basics of Soviet industrial planning, setting the foundation stones for the next half century of the Soviet economy. On November 21, 1923, Groman presented the Presidium of Gosplan with a paper entitled "Problems of Planning the National Economy as a Whole," in which Bazarov argued that the adoption of the mixed economy of the New Economic Policy actually accentuated rather than lessened the need for central economic planning.

Together with Groman, Bazarov was influential in developing the idea that a diminishing rate of growth was an earmark of economies such as that of the Soviet Union which were in the process of recovery. Although in retrospect the observation seems obvious, the "theory of the leveling-off curve" espoused by Groman and Bazarov postulated that an economy with substantial reserves of idle capacity would initially show an inordinately rapid pace of growth as productive capital returned to use, with this rate tapering off as available plant approached full capacity.

In 1924 Bazarov published a pamphlet entitled Towards a Methodology for Strategic Planning in which he further expanded his ideas on the development of central planning procedures as the Soviet economy moved from recovery to expansion. Bazarov remained convinced that central direction of economic investment would provide the impetus for accelerated economic growth, speaking in 1926 of the "hope to overtake and surpass in our development the advanced countries of the capitalist world."

Bazarov was a staunch advocate of using material incentives to motivate the peasantry to expand agricultural output, declaring early in 1927 that "only by amply supplying the village with good industrial products at very low prices can we create a real impulse toward the development of our backward agriculture..." In the wake of weak agricultural marketing by the peasantry in 1927 and 1928, Soviet political leaders moved another direction, however, returning to the coercive requisitioning methods first used during the earlier period of War Communism before moving to a radical drive for complete collectivization of agriculture at the end of the decade.

Bazarov was a voice in the Soviet planning apparatus for a rational rate of growth. In response to a draft Five-Year Plan prepared by the Supreme Council of National Economy (VSNKh) which posited industrial growth of 135% over the five economic years 1927/28 to 1932/33, Bazarov deemed the long-term possibilities "fascinating" and "enchanting." Such a pace was soon dismissed as inadequate by those holding more extreme views, however, and Bazarov was sharply criticized for pessimism in underestimating "the advantages inherent in the Soviet system." Ultimately, a growth of 179% over the five-year period was approved by Soviet planning authorities, and Bazarov, Groman, and others holding similar views favoring a less drastic rate of capital accumulation were shunted aside.

=== 1931 Menshevik Trial ===
Bazarov was arrested by the Soviet secret police during the summer of 1930. At his interrogation of 15 August 1930, he signed a deposition acknowledging his participation in a group with other economists who had been arrested and interrogated by the GPU, including his friend and co-worker Groman and former Socialist Revolutionary Party member Nikolai Kondratiev.

In 1931 the Menshevik Trial was held charging "Mensheviks" in the state planning apparatus with the "wrecking" of Soviet industry through the setting of artificially low planning targets. Although Bazarov was not in the dock among the public defendants, his associate Groman was. Groman gave public testimony that he and Bazarov headed a counterrevolutionary group in Gosplan, purportedly organized in 1923, which attempted at "influencing the economic policy of the Soviet authorities so as to hold the position of 1923-25." Historian Naum Jasny has speculated that Bazarov's failure to appear as a defendant at this major public trial was likely a reflection of the fact that "the GPU did not succeed in breaking him completely enough to make him a desirable member of the trial."

Groman, the star figure among the accused, damned himself and his colleagues with testimony that at Gosplan they had spent their time

"Putting into the control figures and into the surveys of current business planning ideas and deliberately distorted appraisals antagonistic to the general Party line (lowering the rates of expansion of socialist construction, distorting the class approach, exaggerating the difficulties), stressing the signs of an impending catastrophe (Groman) or, what is close to this, assigning a negligible chance of success to the Party line directed toward the socialist attack (Bazarov, Gukhman)..."

Although excluded from the public trial which besmirched him, Bazarov was tried in secret and sentenced to a term of prison for his alleged wrecking activities. A December 1931 letter from the USSR published in the Menshevik journal Sotsialisticheskii vestnik (Socialist Herald) reported that Bazarov was being held at that time in a political "isolator" at Yaroslavl.

=== Death and legacy ===
Bazarov died on 16 September 1939 from pneumonia in Moscow. He was 65 years old at the time of his death.

In 1999 a two volume collection of documents relating to the 1931 Menshevik Trial was published in Russia. Included were the text of several handwritten depositions collected from Bazarov during the process of his interrogation during the summer of 1930.

== Works ==
=== In Russian ===
- (Social Movements of the Middle Ages and Reformation). With I.I. Skvortsov-Stepanov. (c. 1898).
- "Авторитарная метафизика и автономная личность" (Authoritarian Metaphysics and Personal Autonomy), in the collection Очерки реалистического мировоззрения (Studies of Realistic Outlook), 1904.
- «Анархический коммунизм и марксизм» (Communist Anarchism and Marxism). 1906.
- «На два фронта» (On Two Fronts). 1910.
- На пути к социализму: Сборник статей (On the Path to Socialism: A Collection of Articles). Kharkov: Prosvieshchenie, 1919.
- "«Ножницы» и плановое хозяйство" ("The Scissors" and Planned Economy). Экономическое обозрение, 1923, No. 10.
- "К методологии перспективного планирования" (Towards a Methodology for Strategic Planning).
- "К вопросу о хозяйственном плане." (On the Question of an Economic Plan). Экономическое обозрение, 1924, No. 6.
- "Темп накопления и «командные высоты»" (The Rate of Accumulation and the "Commanding Heights"). Экономическое обозрение, 1924, No. 9-10.
- "О методологии построения перспективных планов." (On the Methodology of Long-Term Planning). Плановое хозяйство, 1926, № 7.
- "Кривые развития» капиталистического и советского хозяйства." (The "Curves of Development" of Capitalist and Soviet Economy). Плановое хозяйство, 1926, No. 4.
- Использование бюджетных данных для построения структуры городского спроса в перспективе генерального плана (Using Cost Data to Construct the Structure of Urban Demand in the Perspective of the General Plan), 1927.

=== Bazarov's translations into Russian ===
- Karl Marx, Das Kapital. With I.I. Skvortsov-Stepanov. General editor, A. Bogdanov. 1905–07.
- Очерки по истории Германии в XIX веке. Т. 1. Происхождение современной Германии. (Studies in the History of Germany in the 19th Century: Vol. 1: The Origin of Modern Germany). With I.I. Skvortsov-Stepanov. St. Petersburg, 1906.
- Science and Religion in Contemporary Philosophy by Émile Boutroux with a Preface by the Translator, St Petersburg: Shipovnik Publishers, 1910).
- Элементы философии биологии 1911 by Felix Le Dantec (Elements de philosophie biologique – Elements of Biological Philosophy)

=== Translations of Bazarov into English ===
- What is needed for socialism?, Novaya Zhizn, No. 190/184, 1/14 December 1917, p. 1;
- July or December?, Mysl', Kharkov, No. 5. February 1919.
