= Richard Stites =

American professor and author

- Born: Richard Thomas Stites; December 2, 1931; Philadelphia, Pennsylvania, US
- Died: March 7, 2010 (aged 78); Helsinki, Finland
- Occupations: university professor, author
- Years active: 1966-2010
- Children: 4

Academic background
- Education: University of Pennsylvania, George Washington University
- Alma mater: Harvard University

Richard Stites (December 2, 1931 – March 7, 2010) was a historian of Russian culture and professor of history at Georgetown University, famed for "landmark work on the Russian women’s movement and in numerous articles and books on Russian and Soviet mass culture."

== Background ==
Richard Thomas Stites was born on December 2, 1931, in Philadelphia, PA. He earned a BA in history from the University of Pennsylvania in 1956, and MA in European history from George Washington University in 1959, and a doctorate in Russian History in 1968 from Harvard University under Nicholas V. Riasanovsky and Richard Pipes.

== Career ==
In the early 1960s, Stites taught at Lycoming College before he entered Harvard. He taught at Brown University and the Ohio State University at Lima and then joined Georgetown University in 1977, where he taught until he died.

He was selected for numerous IREX exchanges with Russia, he taught for a time at the U.S. Army Russian Institute in Garmisch-Partenkirchen, Germany, and he was Fulbright Professor at the University of Helsinki in 1995.

== Personal life and death ==
Stites married and divorced three times (Dorothy Jones, Tatyana Tereshchenko, and Elena Stites) and had a daughter and three sons.

Stites spoke or wrote in ten languages. He had a second home in Helsinki.

Richard Stites died age 78 on March 7, 2010, in Helsinki, Finland from complications of esophageal cancer.

== Awards and fellowships ==
- Russian Research Center at Harvard University
- Kennan Institute for Advanced Russian Studies
- Guggenheim Foundation
- Harriman Institute for the Advanced Study of the Soviet Union
- National Endowment for the Humanities
- Honorary doctorate from the University of Helsinki (2003)
- Career Research Achievement Award from the Georgetown University Graduate School (2001)
- School of Foreign Service Board of Visitors Distinguished Professor in International Studies at Georgetown University (2007)

== Legacy ==
Colleagues praised him when he died. David M. Goldfrank, called him "absolutely one of the more important Russian historians of recent times'," reported the Washington Post. Aviel Roshwald called him a "giant in his scholarly field."

In 2013, Georgetown's Department of History established a Richard Stites Memorial Lecture Series because "Richard Stites’ many works in the Russian field swept across the imperial and the Soviet periods and innovated ways of linking cultural explorations to their political, social, and international contexts."

== Works ==
In 1978, Stites published The Women's Liberation Movement in Russia: Feminism, Nihilism and Bolshevism, 1860-1930, " a book that virtually created a subdiscipline, he turned his attention to mass entertainment." In 1984, he wrote the introductory essay for an English translations of Alexander Bogdanov's science fiction novel Red Star. In 1989 he published Revolutionary Dreams: Utopian Vision and Experimental Life in the Russian Revolution. He also edited several books on Russian popular culture, notably Bolshevik Culture (1985), Mass Culture in Soviet Russia and Culture and Entertainment in Wartime Russia (both in 1995). He left unfinished a last book, The Four Horsemen: Revolution and the Counter-Revolution in Post-Napoleonic Europe.

Books

- Women's liberation movement in Russia: feminism, nihilism, and bolshevism, 1860-1930 (1978)
- Iconoclasm in the Russian Revolution: destroying and preserving the past (1981)
- Utopia and experiment in the Russian Revolution: some preliminary thoughts (1981)
- Equality, freedom & justice: women & men in the Russian revolution, 1917-1930 (1988)
- Revolutionary dreams: utopian vision and experimental life in the Russian Revolution (1989)
- Russian popular culture: entertainment and society since 1900 (1992)
- Serfdom, society, and the arts in imperial Russia: the pleasure and the power (2005)
- Four horsemen : riding to liberty in post-Napoleonic Europe (2014)

Other

- Pavel Nikolaevich Mili︠u︡kov, Russian Revolution co-translated by Tatyana Stites, edited and co-translated by Richard Stites (1978)
- Alexander Bogdanov, Red star: the first Bolshevik utopia, edited by Loren R. Graham and Richard Stites, translated by Charles Rougle (1984)
- Bolshevik culture: experiment and order in the Russian Revolution, edited by Abbott Gleason, Peter Kenez, Richard Stites (1985)
- Russia in the era of NEP: explorations in Soviet society and culture, edited by Sheila Fitzpatrick, Alexander Rabinowitch, Richard Stites (1991)
- Culture and entertainment in wartime Russia, edited by Richard Stites (1995)
- Mass culture in Soviet Russia: tales, poems, songs, movies, plays, and folklore, 1917-1953, edited by James von Geldern and Richard Stites (1995)
- European culture in the Great War: the arts, entertainment, and propaganda, 1914-1918, edited by Aviel Roshwald and Richard Stites (1999)

Recordings

- Mass culture in Soviet Russia: tales, poems, songs, movies, plays, and folklore, 1917-1953, edited by James von Geldern and Richard Stites (1995)
