= Boris Hessen =

Soviet physicist, philosopher and historian of science

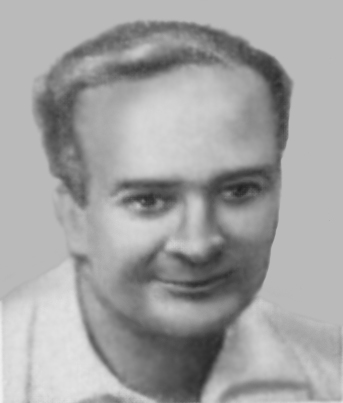
Boris Hessen

Boris Mikhailovich Hessen (Russian: Борис Михайлович Гессен), also Gessen (16 August 1893, Elisavetgrad – 20 December 1936, Moscow), was a Soviet physicist, philosopher and historian of science. He is most famous for his paper on Newton's Principia which became foundational in historiography of science.

== Biography ==
Boris Hessen was born to a Jewish family in Elisavetgrad, in the Kherson Governorate of the Russian Empire (now Kropyvnytskyi, Ukraine). He studied physics and natural sciences at the University of Edinburgh (1913–1914) together with his gymnasium school friend Igor Tamm. He then went to study at the St. Petersburg University (1914–1917). He enlisted in the Red Army in the Russian Civil War, joined the Communist Party in 1919 and became a member of the Revolutionary Military Council (1919–1921) and worked at the Party School. He also continued his physics studies at various places eventually graduating from the Institute of Red Professors in Moscow in 1928. In this year he was criticised by Alexander Maximov, who criticised him for being a "Machist" and "right deviationist".

After working in the institute for two more years, he became a physics professor and the chair of the physics department at the Moscow State University in 1931. In 1933 he was elected a member of the Russian Academy of Sciences.

=== International Congress of the History of Science ===
In 1931, as part of a Soviet delegation led by N.I. Bukharin, Hessen delivered the paper "The Socio-Economic Roots of Newton's Principia" at the Second International Congress of the History of Science in London. This work became foundational in the history of science and led to modern studies of scientific revolutions and sociology of science.

Hessen asserted that Isaac Newton's most famous work was created to cater to the goals and desires of 17th century industry and economy. Hessen asserted that Newton's work was inspired by his economic status and context, that the Principia was the solution of technical problems of the bourgeoisie.

At that time in the Soviet Union, the work of Albert Einstein was under attack by Communist Party philosophers; being supposedly motivated by bourgeois values, it was "bourgeois science", and should henceforth be banned. (In many ways this attack was similar to the Deutsche Physik movement in Germany which occurred only a few years later.) Hessen's paper was a lobbying tactic: Party philosophers would not challenge the accuracy of Newton's theories, and to show them as being motivated by bourgeois concerns would, in Hessen's eyes, show that scientific validity could exist whatever the motivations were for undertaking it. However, there is little evidence that his paper had any effect in the internal Soviet philosophical battles over Einstein's work.

Despite its lack of impact in his home country, Hessen's thesis had a wide effect in Western history of science. Hessen's work has been dismissed as "vulgar Marxism". However, its focus on the relationship between society and science was, in its time, seen as novel and inspiring. It was a challenge to the notion that the history of science was the history of individual genius in action, the dominant view at least since William Whewell's History of the Inductive Sciences in 1837.

Few contemporary Western readers of Hessen took his paper at face value. His rigid connection between economy and knowledge was not accepted by a majority of historians. However, his assertion that a connection existed between the growth of knowledge and the art of war, and that ballistics played a central part of physics and Newton's world, was viewed with keen interest. In the shadow of the first war to employ chemical weapons, and as the war machines were again gearing up in preparation for another world war, the role between science, technology, and warfare was becoming more interesting to scholars and scientists. Previous views of science as separate from the mundane or vulgar aspects of practical life — the disembodiment of the scientific mind from its context — were becoming less attractive than a view that science and scientists were increasingly embedded in the world in which they worked.

=== Last years, death and rehabilitation ===
From 1934 to 1936 Hessen was a deputy director of the Physics Institute in Moscow headed by S.I. Vavilov. On 22 August 1936 Hessen was arrested by the NKVD on charges of participation in a counter-revolutionary terrorist organization and preparation of terrorist acts. He was secretly tried for terrorism by a military tribunal together with his gymnasium school teacher Arkadij O. Apirin, who had been arrested two months earlier.

They were found guilty on 20 December 1936 and were executed by shooting the same day. Hessen was buried in Moscow at the Donskoye Cemetery in a common grave. Hessen was posthumously expelled from the Academy of Sciences of the Soviet Union by the General Assembly on April 29, 1938.

On 21 April 1956, both Apirin and Hessen were rehabilitated (posthumously exonerated) by decision of the All-Russian Military Commission. Hessen was posthumously reinstated by the General Assembly of the Academy of Sciences on March 5, 1957

== Writings ==
- Boris Hessen, The Social and Economic Roots of Newton's Principia in: Freudenthal, G., McLaughlin, P. (eds) The Social and Economic Roots of the Scientific Revolution, pp. 41–101. Boston Studies in the Philosophy of Science 278. Springer, Dordrecht. (Russian original: ).
- New English translation in: Gideon Freudenthal and Peter McLaughlin, The Social and Economic Roots of the Scientific Revolution, Springer, 2009, pp. 41–101.
- Boris Hessen, "Preface to Articles by A. Einstein and J.J. Thomson," trans. Sean Winkler, Society and Politics 13.1 (2019): 87 - 102. http://socpol.uvvg.ro/docs/2019-1/5.Hessen.pdf.
- Classical Physics in Context (unpublished text- and sourcebook, in preparation with Edizioni Ca'Foscari Venice).
- Boris Hessen: Physics and Philosophy in the Soviet Union, 1927–1931, Neglected Debates on Emergence and Reduction, edited and translated by Chris Talbot and Olga Pattison, Cham, Switzerland: Springer, 2021. ISBN 978-3-030-70044-7.

== See also ==
- History of science and technology

== Notes ==
=== Works cited ===
- Schaffer, Simon (1984), "Newton at the crossroads", Radical Philosophy, 37: 23–38.
