= Materialism and Empirio-criticism =

1909 book by Vladimir Lenin

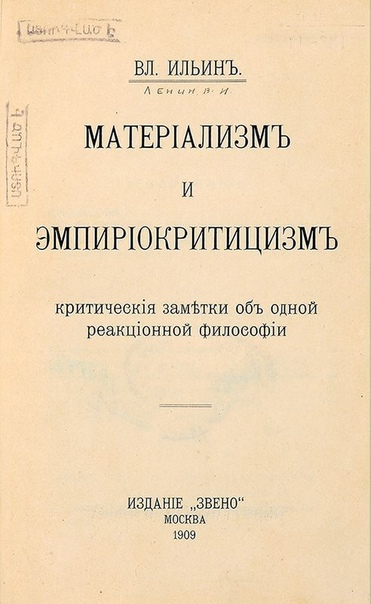
- Front cover of the first edition of Lenin's Materialism and Empirio-criticism, published in Moscow in 1909 under the pseudonym "Vl. Ilyin."
- Author: Vladimir Lenin
- Original title: Материализм и эмпириокритицизм
- Language: Russian
- Genre: Philosophy
- Publication date: 1909

Materialism and Empirio-criticism (Russian: Материализм и эмпириокритицизм, Materializm i empiriokrititsizm) is a philosophical work by Vladimir Lenin, published in 1909. It was an obligatory subject of study in all institutions of higher education in the Soviet Union, as a seminal work of dialectical materialism, a part of the curriculum called "Marxist–Leninist Philosophy". Lenin said that human minds are capable of forming representations of the world that portray the world as it is. Thus, Lenin said, our beliefs about the world can be objectively true; a belief is true when it accurately reflects the facts. According to Lenin, absolute truth is possible, but our theories are often only relatively true. Scientific theories can therefore constitute knowledge of the world.

Lenin formulates the fundamental philosophical contradiction between idealism and materialism as follows: "Materialism is the recognition of 'objects in themselves' or objects outside the mind; the ideas and sensations are copies or images of these objects. The opposite doctrine (idealism) says: the objects do not exist, outside the mind '; they are 'connections of sensations'."

== Background ==
The book, whose full title is Materialism and Empirio-criticism. Critical Comments on a Reactionary Philosophy, was written by Lenin from February through October 1908 while he was in Geneva and London and was published in Moscow in May 1909 by Zveno Publishers. The original manuscript and preparatory materials have been lost.

Most of the book was written when Lenin was in Geneva, apart from the one month spent in London, where he visited the library of the British Museum to access modern philosophical and natural science material. The index lists in excess of 200 sources for the book.

In December 1908, Lenin moved from Geneva to Paris, where he worked until April 1909 on correcting the proofs. Some passages were edited to avoid tsarist censorship. It was published in Imperial Russia with great difficulty. Lenin insisted on the rapid distribution of the book and said that "not only literary but also serious political obligations" were involved in its publication.

The book was written as a reaction and criticism to the three-volume work Empiriomonism (1904–1906) by Alexander Bogdanov, his political opponent within the Party. In June 1909, Bogdanov was defeated at a Bolshevik mini-conference in Paris and expelled from the Central Committee, but he still retained a relevant role in the Party's left wing. He participated in the Russian Revolution and in 1919 he was appointed to the praesidium of the Socialist Academy of Social Sciences.

Materialism and Empirio-criticism was republished in Russian in 1920 with an introduction attacking Bogdanov by Vladimir Nevsky, the Rector of the Sverdlov Communist University. It subsequently appeared in over 20 languages and acquired canonical status in Marxist–Leninist philosophy.

== Chapters summary ==
Chapter I
The Epistemology of Empiriocriticism and Dialectical Materialism I

Lenin then discusses the "solipsism" of Mach and Avenarius.

Chapter II
The Epistemology of Empiriocriticism and Dialectical Materialism II

Lenin, Chernov and Bazarov confront the views of Ludwig Feuerbach, Joseph Dietzgen and Friedrich Engels and comment on the criterion of practice in epistemology.

Chapter III
The Epistemology of Empiriocriticism and Dialectical Materialism III

Lenin seeks to define "matter" and "experience" and addresses the questions of causality and necessity in nature as well as "freedom and necessity" and the "principle of the economy of thought".

Chapter IV
The Philosophical Idealists as Collaborators and Successors of Empiriocriticism

Lenin deals with left and right Kant criticism, with the philosophy of immanence, Bogdanov's empiriomonism, and the critique of Hermann von Helmholtz on the "theory of symbols."

Chapter V
The Latest Revolution in Science and Philosophical Idealism

Lenin deals with the thesis that "the crisis of physics" "has disappeared matter". In this context he speaks of a "physical idealism" and notes (on p. 260): "For the only" property "of matter to whose acknowledgment philosophical materialism is bound is the property of being objective reality, outside of our consciousness."

Chapter VI
Empiriocriticism and Historical Materialism

Lenin discusses authors such as Bogdanov, Suvorov, Ernst Haeckel and Ernst Mach.

In an addition to Chapter IV, Lenin addresses the question: "From what side did N. G. Chernyshevsky criticize Kantianism?"

== Philosophers and scientists cited ==
Lenin cites philosophers, including:

=== Immanentist ===
- Richard Avenarius
- Ernst Mach
- Richard von Schubert-Soldern
- Joseph Petzoldt

=== Russian Machists ===
- Jakov Berman
- Osip Helfond
- Sergei Suvorov
- Pavel Yushkevich

== See also ==
- Anti-Dühring
- Empirio-criticism
- Vladimir Lenin bibliography
