= Joseph Petzoldt =

German philosopher (1862–1929)

- Born: 4 November 1862; Altenburg, Saxe-Altenburg, German Confederation
- Died: 1 August 1929 (aged 66); Berlin, Prussia, Weimar Germany

Education
- Education: University of Göttingen

Philosophical work
- Era: 20th-century philosophy
- Region: Western philosophy
- School: Positivism; Empirio-criticism
- Institutions: TH Charlottenburg
- Main interests: Empirical knowledge, philosophy of science
- Notable ideas: Relativistic positivism

Joseph Petzoldt (German: [ˈpɛtsɔlt]; 4 November 1862 – 1 August 1929) was a German positivist philosopher and teacher. He is known as the founder of several societies aimed at advancing positivist philosophy in the scientific world, and was an early proponent of the theory of relativity which he interpreted on the basis of his philosophy of "relativistic positivism".

== Life ==
He studied natural sciences in the 1880s. In 1890 he obtained his doctorate in Göttingen on the economy principle with the paper Maxima, Minima und Ökonomie. In 1891 he became senior teacher in at the Gymnasium in Spandau. In 1904 he obtained the habilitation in philosophy with the second volume of his work Einführung in die Philosophie der Reinen Erfahrung, and taught as a Privatdozent at the TH Charlottenburg (today TU Berlin). In 1922 he became professor extraordinarius of philosophy at the TH Charlottenburg. Ludwig Wittgenstein possibly attended lectures on mechanics by Petzoldt in Berlin between 1906 and 1908.

== Philosophy and relativity ==
Petzoldt's philosophy, developed in the late 19th and early 20th century, (Note: Maxima, Minima und Ökonomie, 1891.) (Note: Das Gesetz der Eindeutigkeit, 1895, Vierteljahrsschrift für wissenschaftliche Philosophie (19), pp. 146–203.) (Note: Einführung in die Philosophie der Reinen Erfahrung, vol. 1 (Die Bestimmtheit der Seele), 1900 and 2 (Auf dem Wege zum Dauernden), 1904.) (Note: Das Weltproblem von positivistischem Standpunkte aus, 1906, Leipzig: Teubner.) (Note: Die Gebiete der absoluten und der relativen Bewegung, 1908, Annalen der Naturphilosophie (7), pp. 29–62.) and called "relativistic positivism" by him since 1912, (Note: Das Weltproblem vom Standpunkte des relativistischen Positivismus aus, 2nd edition 1912; 3rd edition 1921; 4th edition 1924) was based on the positivistic-phenomenalistic philosophy of empirio-criticism by Ernst Mach and Richard Avenarius. He emphasized the relative nature of all phenomena from the perspective of observers in line with Protagoras and the rejection of the concept of substance in line with George Berkeley, thereby eliminating the difference between "appearance" and "reality", and defined the "law of univocalness" according to which all observers must achieve a univocally determined description of processes. Vladimir Lenin in his work Materialism and Empirio-criticism (1909) criticized the views of Petzoldt and other followers of Mach as solipsism. Petzoldt was founder and first chairman of the "society for positivist philosophy" (1912–1921) which was supported by Albert Einstein, David Hilbert, Sigmund Freud, and Felix Klein, among others; and he was co-founder of the "local Berlin group" of the "international society for empirical philosophy" (1927).

As Hentschel and in more detail Russo Krauss have shown, Petzoldt was an early supporter and interpreter of the theory of relativity: In 1912 (Note: Die Relativitätstheorie im erkenntnistheoretischen Zusammenhange des relativistischen Positivismus, 1912. Verhandlungen der Deutschen Physikalischen Gesellschaft, Vol. 14, pp. 1055–1064.) and particularly in 1914 (Note: Die Relativitätstheorie der Physik, 1914. Zeitschrift für positivistische Philosophie, Vol. 2, pp. 1–56) he described the theory as a consistent implementation of the Machian philosophy and relativistic positivism. He emphasized the equivalence of all observer viewpoints, the relativity of lengths and times, and the principle of light speed constancy as the direct outcome of the Fizeau experiment and the Michelson–Morley experiment, even though he had reservations about the conclusion that there can be no higher speeds in nature than that of light. Petzoldt's paper of 1914 was received very favorably by Einstein, who publicly recommended it in a newspaper article and also privately shared his broad consent by letter (even though Einstein had to correct Petzoldt's erroneous description of the twin paradox). Petzoldt handed over one of his books to Einstein at a personal meeting, after which Einstein wrote in a letter to Petzoldt that from reading the book he noticed "with delight" that he had "long shared your convictions". According to Howard, Petzoldt's philosophical "law of univocalness" may have also been influential on Einstein's "point-coincidence argument" that resolves the hole argument. In a letter from 1919, Petzoldt thanked Einstein for recommending him to a professorship in philosophy, even though that initiative proved to be unsuccessful. Petzoldt continued to defend his interpretation in the 1920s, believing that Einstein's new general theory of relativity was consistent with Machian philosophy, particularly in regard to the role that Mach's principle and all "coincidences of impressions" play in that theory. (Note: Die Stellung der Relativitätstheorie in der geistigen Entwicklung der Menschheit, Leipzig, Barth, 1921; 2. enlarged edition 1923.) (Note: Das Verhältnis der Machschen Gedankenwelt zur Relativitätstheorie, 1921. Appendix to the 8. edition of Ernst Mach's Die Mechanik in ihrer Entwickelung historisch-kritisch dargestellt, pp. 490ff) (Note: Mechanistische Naturauffassung und Relativitätstheorie, 1921. Annalen der Philosophie, 2, pp. 447–462.)

However, Petzoldt's radical relativistic-positivistic interpretation of relativity theory, along with insufficient technical understanding, led him to commit fundamental errors: In 1918–1919 he criticized representations of relativity theory that he believed to be reliant on "absolute" views and concepts, (Note: Verbietet die Relativitätstheorie Raum und Zeit als etwas wirkliches zu denken?, 1918. Verhandlungen der Deutschen Physikalischen Gesellschaft, Vol. 20, pp. 189–201.) (Note: Die Unmöglichkeit mechanischer Modelle zur Veranschaulichung der Relativitätstheorie, 1919. Verhandlungen der Deutschen Physikalischen Gesellschaft, Vol. 21, pp. 495–503.) causing Einstein to write that he was "disappointed" in Petzoldt whose earlier writings on relativity have been better. Petzoldt also misunderstood the Ehrenfest paradox, which even an exchange of letters with Einstein in 1919 failed to clarify. Petzoldt also continued to be unconvinced about the twin paradox (which he had already criticized in 1914 as "a return to absolutist thinking") as shown in a correspondence with Hans Reichenbach in 1922. Petzoldt's philosophy, along with his interpretation of the theory of relativity, was increasingly criticized and rejected by other philosophers such as Reichenbach, Moritz Schlick and Ernst Cassirer in the early 1920s, at which time also Einstein moved away from Machian philosophy towards a philosophical realism and apparently ceased his relations to Petzoldt after 1920.

The philosophical relationship between Petzoldt, Mach and Einstein also played a role in the controversy over a posthumously published preface to Mach's book Optics, allegedly written by Ernst Mach in July 1913, in which he rejected the theory of relativity. Wolters argues that this preface was actually not written by Ernst Mach, but a forgery by his anti-relativist son Ludwig Mach, because various sources and letters apparently show that Ernst Mach around 1913–1914 did not reject the theory of relativity, but had a very positive opinion of it. For example, there is a letter from Ernst Mach to Petzoldt dated 1 May 1914, which begins: "The accompanied letter from Einstein proves the penetration of positivist philosophy into physics; you can rejoice about it ... A year ago, philosophy as such was a mere stupidity...". From that Wolters concludes that in Mach's opinion, positivist philosophy entered modern physics through relativity theory, and since relativity is perhaps the most advanced physical theory that sets the standards for philosophy, it follows that positivist philosophy is no longer stupid unlike other philosophies. Thus, there is an emphatic statement of Mach in favor of relativity, written after the alleged foreword of July 1913. Wolters also alludes to the rivalry between Petzoldt and Ludwig Mach: In 1921, Petzoldt published an appendix to the 8th edition of Ernst Mach's book Mechanics, in which Petzoldt described relativity as a consequence of Ernst Mach's philosophy, while Ludwig soon afterwards published the aforementioned (forged, according to Wolters) anti-relativistic foreword in Optics. After Petzoldt's death, Ludwig published the 9th edition of Mechanics in 1933, in which Petzoldt's pro-relativistic appendix was removed and a new preface appeared, in which Ludwig once again inserted (forged, according to Wolters) anti-relativistic statements of Ernst Mach.

== Writings (selection) ==
- Sonderschulen für hervorragend Befähigte. Teubner, Leipzig und Berlin 1905. (Reprint 2018: ISBN 978-0-364-32257-4)
- Das allgemeinste Entwicklungsgesetz, 1923
- Das natürliche Höhenziel der menschheitlichen Entwicklung, 1927
