= Richard von Schubert-Soldern =

Richard Ritter von Schubert-Soldern (14 December 1852, Prague, Kingdom of Bohemia – 19 October 1924, Zwettl, Austria) was a philosopher in Austria-Hungary and later Austria. (His year of death is sometimes said to have been 1935.)

Schubert-Soldern earned a doctorate at the University of Prague in 1879 and habilitated at Leipzig University in 1882 with a thesis titled Ueber Trancendenz des Objects und Subjects (On the Transcendence of the Object and Subjects).

He held teaching posts at Leipzig University and a Görz gymnasium. He defended immanent philosophy and epistemological solipsism.

== Works ==
- Über Transzendenz des Objekts und des Subjekts, 1882
- Grundlagen einer Erkenntnistheorie, 1884
- Grundlagen zu einer Ethik, 1887
- Reproduction, Gefühl und Wille, 1887
- Das menschliche Glück und die soziale Frage, 1896
- Die soziale Deutung der ästhetischen Bildung, 1897
- Die menschliche Erziehung, 1905.
