= Pavel Yushkevich =

Russian philosopher

Pavel Solomonovich Yushkevich (Russian: Павел Соломонович Юшкевич; 29 June 1873, in Odessa – December 6, 1945, in Moscow) was a Russian philosopher. He was a Menshevik activist and participated as one of the Russian Machists in Studies in the Philosophy of Marxism in 1908. This publication prompted criticism in Lenin's Materialism and Empirio-criticism. By the 1920s Yushkevich abandoned political activities and worked at the Marx-Engels Institute in Moscow from 1922.

== Early years ==
He attended Odessa High School, where he became active in a Marxist study circle. He was arrested and jailed, however, before being sent to exile in Kishinev, where he showed particular interest in mathematics. He went into exile in France and studied mathematics at the Sorbonne in Paris. Upon graduation he returned to Odessa. Here he had to attend lectures to gain a qualification recognised in Russia. He later became a journalist.

== Philosophical work ==
Yushkevich saw no need for Marxism to be fearful of "bourgeois theories", claiming that if Marxism was as powerful as it purported to be, it would simply assimilate other theories rather than be assimilated by them.

== Family life ==
His son, Adolph P. Yushkevich, was a historian of mathematics.

== Works ==
- 1907 Sovremennyi mir (The Modern World), 1907, April, St. Petersburg,
- 1908 Sovremennaya energetika s tochki zreniya empiriosimvolizma (Modern Energy in Terms of Empiriosymbolism) in Studies in the Philosophy of Marxism V. Bezobrazov & Co.: St. Petersburg
