= Osip Gelfond =

Osip Isaakovich Gelfond (Russian: Осип Ге́льфонд; 1868–1942) was a Russian physician and Marxist philosopher.

Osip studied at the University of Paris, gaining a medical degree in 1896. He married Musia Gershevna in 1899, who had also recently graduated with a medical degree from the Sorbonne. Gelfond was friends with Anatoly Lunacharsky, Lazar Lagin and Lev Tumarkin.

He participated in a seminar held in St Petersburg in 1908 by the Russian Machists which led to the publication of Studies in the Philosophy of Marxism.

He was the father of Alexander Gelfond, born in 1906.
