= Alexander Borovsky =

Russian-American pianist

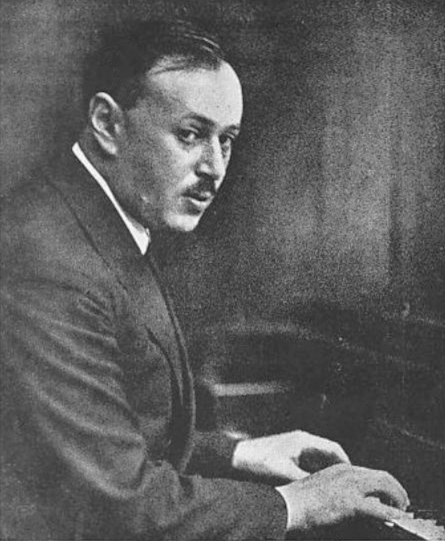
- Born: March 18, 1889; Mitau, Russian Empire
- Died: April 27, 1968 (aged 79); Waban, Massachusetts, US
- Burial place: Newton Cemetery
- Education: St. Petersburg Conservatory
- Occupation: Pianist

Alexander Borovsky (also spelled Borowski and Borowsky; 1889-1968) was a Russian-American pianist. He completed his studies at the St. Petersburg Conservatory in 1912 with a gold medal and the Anton Rubinstein Prize.

== Early life and career ==
Alexander Borovsky was born in Mitau, Russian Empire (now Jelgava, Latvia) on March 18, 1889. His first piano teacher was his mother, a pupil of Vasily Safonov. He graduated from the St. Petersburg Conservatory in 1912.

He created great attention in the 1912 Anton Rubinstein competition which he won. He received a degree in law from St. Petersburg University alongside his music studies. Alexander Borovsky taught master-classes at the Moscow Conservatory from 1915 to 1920.

The May 11, 1916 Musical Courier writes from Moscow newspaper of March 1915, "Alexander Borowski is a pupil of Anna Essipova. He is a pianist of great skill, power and alluring charm, with strong rhythm and well modulated dynamics. Mr. Borowski respects the composer's design and has the gift of bringing the spirit of it. Scriabine's Tenth Sonata (the last composed), a most difficult work of account of its complexity and theosophical spirit, was performed by Borowski at his recital with rarely deep analysis, glowing with fire progressively in a climax."

"Occasionally, in the midst of scores of concerts, most of which are only of mediocre quality, we are reminded of the adage that while, "many are called, few are chosen." "One of the chosen, musically speaking of course, is the Russian pianist, Alexander Borowsky, who is certainly a rising star in the tonal heavens. One must hear him play Bach in order to admire his precision, clear articulation, dynamics and colorful shading. But not only does he excel in the classics, but he seems also to be a born interpreter of modern music, especially of the young Russian school. His success here was a genuine one."

After winning fame here as a pianist of widely diversified programs, Borovsky returned to Europe where, in 1937, he first devoted himself almost exclusively to presenting the works of Johann Sebastian Bach. At the outbreak of the war, Mr. Borovsky first went to South America, where he continued his Bach cycles—the first such recitals ever to be presented in many of the Latin-American capitals—and where he earned fresh laurels. He gave live Bach evenings in Buenos Aires, with marked acclaim, and, as a result, was invited to repeat his performances under the auspices of the Cutura Artistica of São Paulo, in Brazil.

Deciding to leave Russia after the October Revolution, he started touring in Europe and eventually made his American debut in Carnegie Hall in 1923. He became a US national in 1941 and a professor at the Boston University in 1956. He was a soloist with all the major orchestras in Europe and North and South America, appearing as soloist in more than 30 concerts with the Boston Symphony Orchestra under the late Serge Koussevitzky. At the same time he began to record some of the significant works of Bach and Liszt and he was the first artist to record Bach's 30 Inventions and all of Liszt's Hungarian Rhapsodies. Borovsky's work was distinguished by his objective interpretation of classical and romantic music. His playing of Bach, critics said, was notable for its architectural quality. Mme. Scriabin's writes in Musical Courier, October 18, 1917, page 27 "I also propose the name of Alexandre Borowsky, a young professor of the Conservatory of Moscow, who plays almost all the works of Scriabine, and who has already acquired a great reputation as a pianist in Russia. Mr. Borowsky is a member of the Scriabine Society." "Addresses on various aspects of Scriabin's art have been given by MM. Braudo, Makovsky, and Bryanchanimov, and the performance of the later works and also of some posthumous pieces has been in the hands of Borovsky's pianoforte music. Borovsky's position is the more honourable since no Russian recital programme is complete without Scriabin's name, and this artist has therefore no rivals."

In 1926 Borowski writes in Modern Masters of the Keyboard by Harriette Brower,

Yes I have a very large repertoire and am constantly adding to it. While I was in South America I gave many concerts in various cities. In Buenos Aires I gave twelve entirely different programs in ten weeks. I play much Russian music, of course--Scriabine, Prokofieff and many others. But I play the music of all countries and all epochs. American music and MacDowell. Very little American music is known in Russia, I think. As for MacDowell, of course we know him by name, and a few of the more brilliant numbers, such as the Hexen Tanz, Polonaise and Concerto for piano, but not the Sonatas. I should like to do one or more of these, and also some works by other American composers. Now that I have been in America, the musical growth of your country interests me immensely. I have had a happy two months here, and I hope to return for a longer stay. But now, after our two happy months, Madame and I are on the point of returning to Europe, as I have a tour of forty concerts on the other side, which will take me to London, Paris, Spain, Italy, Belgium, Holland and Germany. But all the time I shall look forward to my return to your beautiful country--America!

The following Welte-Mignon piano rolls were probably recorded in Russia by Borowski in 1910 at Moscow and St. Petersburg: #2029 Tchaikovsky: Sonata, Op 27, in G, Movement 1, #2030 Rachmaninoff's Elegie, fr "Morceaux de fantasie", Op 3 No 1 in E-flat minor (January, 1910), #2031 Arensky: Etude, fr. 24 Morceaux characteristiques, Op 36 no 13 in F-sharp, #2032: Liadow: Barcarolle, Op 44 in F-sharp, #2033 Rachmaninoff: Prelude, Op 23 No 3 in D minor (January 1910).

== Later life ==
Borovsky died in Waban, Massachusetts on April 27, 1968, and was buried at Newton Cemetery.
