= Richard Avenarius =

German-Swiss philosopher (1843–1896)

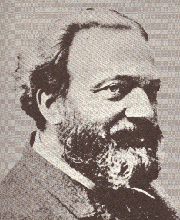
- Born: Richard Habermann; 19 November 1843; Paris, France
- Died: 18 August 1896 (aged 52); Zurich, Switzerland
- Other name: Richard Heinrich Ludwig Avenarius

Education
- Education: University of Zurich; University of Berlin; Leipzig University
- Academic advisors: Moritz Wilhelm Drobisch, Carl Ludwig, Friedrich Zarncke

Philosophical work
- Era: 19th-century philosophy
- Region: Western philosophy
- School: Positivism
- Institutions: Leipzig University; University of Zurich
- Notable students: Anatoly Lunacharsky
- Main interests: Empirical knowledge, philosophy of science
- Notable ideas: Empirio-criticism

Richard Heinrich Ludwig Avenarius (born Richard Habermann; 19 November 1843 – 18 August 1896) was a German-Swiss philosopher, born in Paris. He formulated the radical positivist doctrine of "empirical criticism" or empirio-criticism.

== Life ==
Avenarius attended the Nicolaischule in Leipzig and studied at the University of Zurich, Berlin, and the University of Leipzig. At the University of Leipzig, he received the Doctor of Philosophy in 1868 with his thesis on Baruch Spinoza and his pantheism, obtained the habilitation in 1876, and taught there as Privatdozent. One year later, he became a professor at the University of Zurich. He died in Zurich in 1896.

== Work ==
Avenarius believed that scientific philosophy must be concerned with purely descriptive definitions of experience, which must be free of both metaphysics and materialism. His opposition to the materialist assertions of Carl Vogt resulted in an attack upon empirio-criticism by Vladimir Lenin in the latter's Materialism and Empirio-criticism.

Avenarius' principal works are the famously difficult Kritik der reinen Erfahrung (Critique of Pure Experience, 1888–1890) and Der menschliche Weltbegriff (The Human Concept of the World, 1891) which influenced Ernst Mach, Ber Borochov and, to a lesser extent, William James.

He taught Anatoly Lunacharsky and was also influential on Alexander Bogdanov and Nikolai Valentinov.

== Family ==
Avenarius was the second son of the German publisher Eduard Avenarius and Cäcilie née Geyer, a daughter of the actor and painter Ludwig Geyer and a (step-)sister of Richard Wagner. However, there is speculation that her father was the biological father of Richard Wagner too. Richard Avenarius's brother, Ferdinand Avenarius, led the cultural organization Dürerbund and belonged to the initiators of a culture reform movement in Germany. Wagner was Avenarius's godfather.

== Bibliography ==
- Ueber die beiden ersten Phasen des Spinozischen Pantheismus und das Verhältnis der zweiten zur dritten Phase. Eduard Avenarius, Leipzig 1868.
- Philosophie als Denken der Welt gemäß dem Prinzip des kleinsten Kraftmaßes. Prolegomena zu einer Kritik der reinen Erfahrung. Fues, Leipzig 1876; 2nd ed. 1903.
- Kritik der reinen Erfahrung, (Critique of Pure Experience) 2 vols. Fues, Leipzig 1888/1890; 2nd ed. 1907/1908.
- Der menschliche Weltbegriff. Reisland, Leipzig 1891; 2nd ed. 1905; 3rd ed. 1912.

== See also ==
- Joseph Petzoldt

== Notes ==
See John Deathridge, "Introduction" p. XXXIII in Richard Wagner. The Family Letters of Richard Wagner, University of Michigan Press, 1991. ISBN 0-472-10292-3
