= Jakov Berman =

Russian philosopher

Jakov Alexandrovich Berman (Russian: Я́ков Алекса́ндрович Берма́н; 15 January 1868 – 1933) was a Russian philosopher and political theorist linked to Russian Machism and pragmatism.

In 1908 he published Dialectics in the Light of the Modern Theory of Knowledge and also contributed to Studies in the Philosophy of Marxism, an anthology of works by Russian Marxist Machists, which Lenin criticised in Materialism and Empirio-criticism. Lenin also criticised his Dialectics in the Light of the Modern Theory of Knowledge.

In 1911 Berman published The Essence of Pragmatism.

After the Bolshevik seizure of power, he joined the Russian Communist Party (Bolshevik) and continued his academic career.
