= Anatoly Lunacharsky =

Russian revolutionary, Soviet statesman and writer (1875–1933)

- Анатолий Луначарский
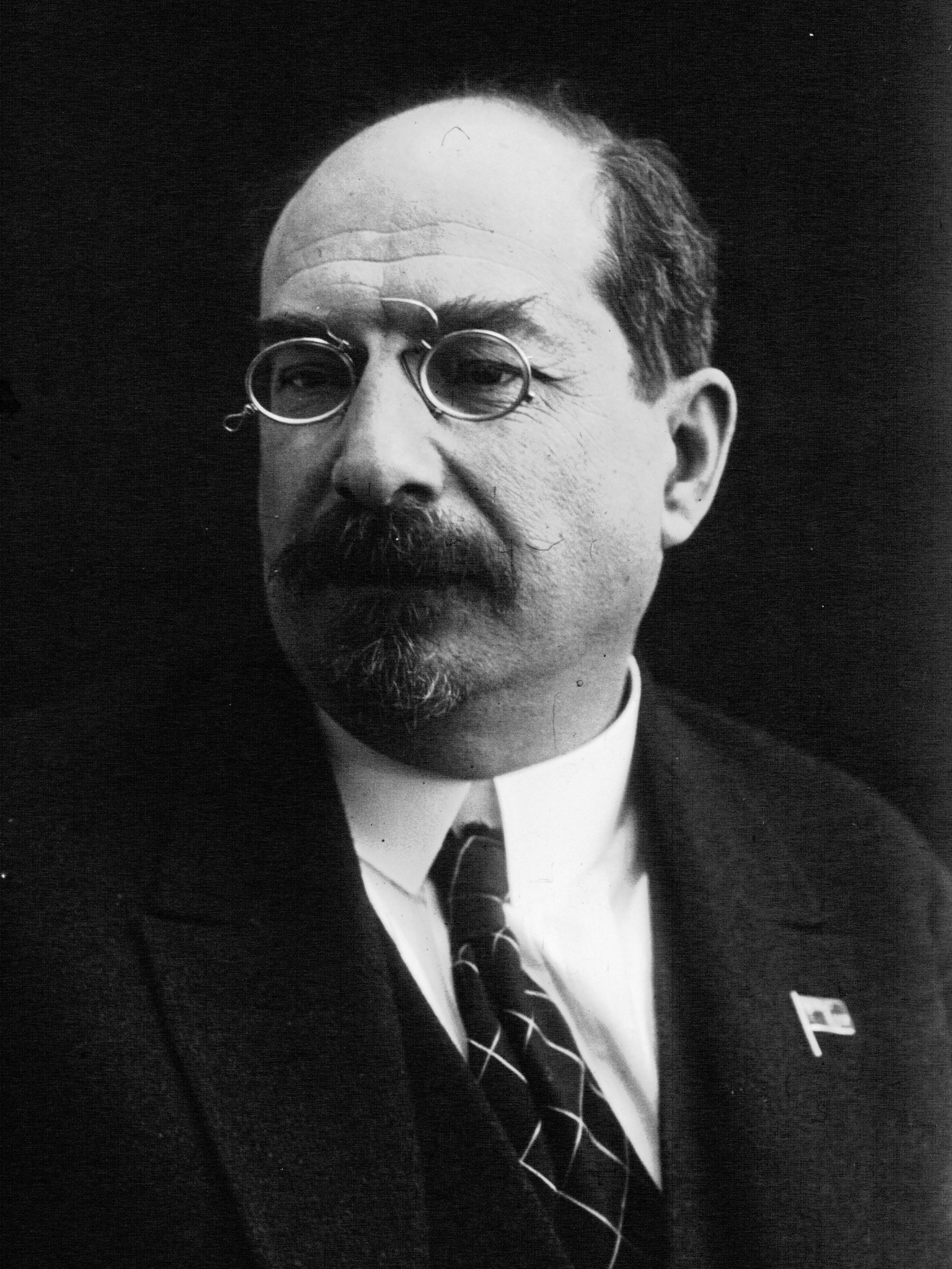
- Lunacharsky in 1925

People's Commissar for Education
- In office 26 October 1917 – 12 September 1929
- Premier: Vladimir Lenin; Alexei Rykov
- Preceded by: Office established
- Succeeded by: Andrei Bubnov

Soviet Minister Plenipotentiary to Spain
- In office 20 August 1933 – 26 December 1933
- Premier: Vyacheslav Molotov
- Preceded by: Office established
- Succeeded by: Marcel Rosenberg

Personal details
- Born: Anatoly Aleksandrovich Antonov; 23 November [O.S. 11 November] 1875 Poltava, Russian Empire
- Died: 26 December 1933 (aged 58) Menton, Alpes-Maritimes, France
- Party: RSDLP (Bolsheviks) (1903–1918); Russian Communist Party (1918–1933)
- Education: University of Zurich
- Occupation: Politician; essayist; journalist
- Anatoly Lunacharsky's voice Recorded in 1926
- Central institution membership: 1919–1921: Member, Central Auditing Commission of the 8th Congress of RCP(b)

Anatoly Vasilyevich Lunacharsky (Russian: Анатолий Васильевич Луначарский; born Anatoly Aleksandrovich Antonov; 23 November [O.S. 11 November] 1875 – 26 December 1933) was a Russian Marxist revolutionary and the first Soviet People's Commissar (minister) of Education, as well as an active playwright, critic, essayist, and journalist throughout his career.

== Background ==
Lunacharsky was born on 23 or 24 November 1875 in Poltava, in the Russian Empire (now in Ukraine), as the illegitimate child of state councillor Alexander Antonov and Alexandra Lunacharskaya, née Rostovtseva. His mother was then married to statesman Vasily Lunacharsky, a nobleman of Polish origin, whence Anatoly's surname and patronym. She later divorced Vasily Lunacharsky and married Antonov, but Anatoly kept his former name.

In 1890, at the age of 15, Lunacharsky became a Marxist. From 1894, he studied at the University of Zurich under Richard Avenarius for two years without taking a degree. In Zürich he met European socialists, including Rosa Luxemburg and Leo Jogiches, and joined the Russian Social Democratic Labour Party. He also lived for a time in France.

== Early career ==
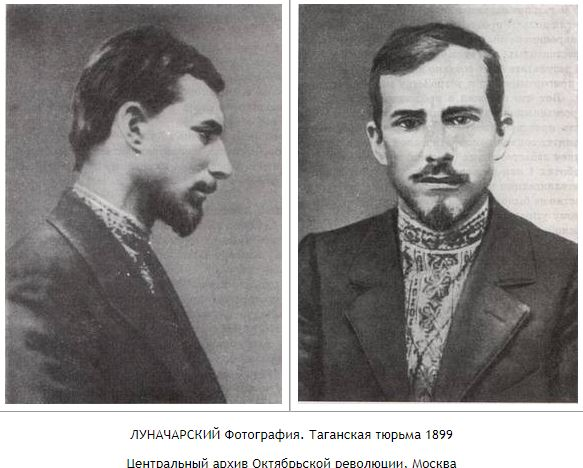
Lunacharsky in 1899

In 1899, Lunacharsky returned to Russia, where he and Maria Ulyanova (Vladimir Lenin's sister) revived the Moscow Committee of the Russian Social Democratic Labour Party (RSDLP), until they were betrayed by an informant and arrested. He was allowed to settle in Kiev, but was arrested again after resuming his political activities, and after ten months in prison he was sent to Kaluga, where he joined a Marxist circle that included Alexander Bogdanov and Vladimir Bazarov.

In February 1902, he was exiled to Kushinov village in Vologda, where he again shared his exile with Bogdanov, whose sister he married, and with the Legal Marxist Nikolai Berdyaev and the Socialist Revolutionary terrorist Boris Savinkov among others. After the first issue of Lenin's newspaper Iskra had reached Vologda, Bogdanov and Lunacharsky organised a Marxist circle that distributed illegal literature, while he also legally wrote theatre criticism for a local liberal newspaper. In March 1903, the governor of Vologda ordered Lunacharsky to be transferred further north, to Totma, where they were the only political exiles.

In 1903, the RSDLP split between the Bolsheviks, led by Vladimir Lenin, and the Mensheviks. Lunacharsky, who by now had ended his period in exile and was back in Kiev, originally believed that the split was unnecessary and joined the 'conciliators', who hoped to bring the two sides together, but he was converted to Bolshevism by Bogdanov. In 1904, he moved to Geneva and became one of Lenin's most active collaborators and an editor of the first exclusively Bolshevik newspaper, Vpered. According to Nadezhda Krupskaya:

Lunacharsky turned out to be a brilliant orator and did a great deal to assist in strengthening the Bolshevik positions. From then on Lenin became on very good terms with Lunacharsky, became jolly in his presence, and was rather partial towards him even at the time of the difference with the Vpered-ites. And Anatoly Vasilyevich was always particularly keen and witty in Lenin's presence.

Lunacharsky returned to Russia after the outbreak of the 1905 Revolution. In Moscow he co-edited the journal Novaya zhizn and other Bolshevik publications, which could be published legally, and gave lectures on art and literature. Arrested during a workers' meeting, he spent a month in Kresty Prison.

Soon after his release, he faced "extremely serious" charges, and fled abroad, via Finland, in March 1906. In 1907, he attended the International Socialist Congress held in Stuttgart.

=== Vpered ===
In 1908, when the Bolsheviks split between Lenin's supporters and Alexander Bogdanov's followers, Lunacharsky supported his brother-in-law Bogdanov in setting up a new Vpered. During this period, he wrote a two-volume work on the relationship between Marxism and religion, Religion and Socialism (1908, 1911), declaring that god should be interpreted as "humanity in the future". This earned him the description "god builder".

Like many contemporary socialists (including Bogdanov), Lunacharsky was influenced by the empirio-criticism philosophy of Ernst Mach and Avenarius. Lenin opposed Machism as a form of subjective idealism and strongly criticised its proponents in his book Materialism and Empirio-criticism (1908).

In 1909, Lunacharsky joined Bogdanov and Maxim Gorky at the latter's villa on the island of Capri, where they started a school for Russian socialist workers. In 1910, Bogdanov, Lunacharsky, Mikhail Pokrovsky and their supporters moved the school to Bologna, where they continued teaching classes through 1911. In 1911, Lunacharsky moved to Paris, where he started his own Circle of Proletarian Culture.

=== World War I ===
After the outbreak of World War I in 1914, Lunacharsky adopted an internationalist antiwar position, which put him on a course of convergence with Lenin and Leon Trotsky. In 1915, Lunacharsky and Pavel Lebedev-Poliansky restarted the social democratic newspaper Vpered with an emphasis on proletarian culture. From 1915, he also worked for the daily newspaper Nashe Slovo, sometimes acting as peacemaker between the two editors, Trotsky and the Menshevik internationalist Julius Martov.

After the February Revolution of 1917, Lunacharsky left his family in Switzerland and returned to Russia on a sealed train - though not the same train that Lenin had used earlier. Like other internationalist social democrats returning from abroad, he briefly joined the Mezhraiontsy before they merged with the Bolsheviks in July–August 1917. He was also the cultural editor of Novaya Zhizn, until forced against his will to sever this connection, because the paper took an anti-Bolshevik line.

Even before he formally joined the Bolsheviks, he proved to be one of their most popular and effective orators, often sharing a platform with Trotsky. He was arrested with Trotsky on 22 July 1917, on a charge of inciting the "July Days" riots, and was held in Kresty prison until September.

== People's Commissariat for Education (Narkompros) ==
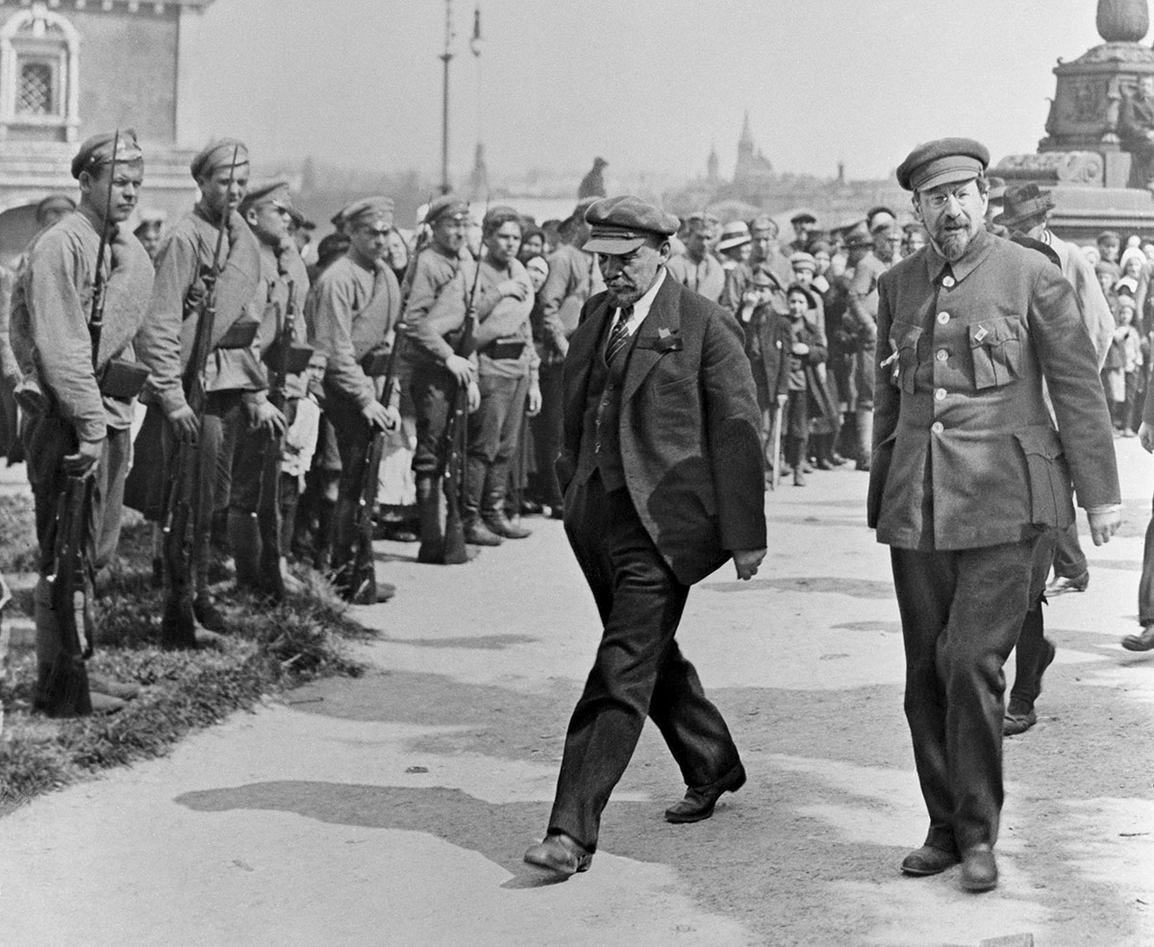
V. I. Lenin and A.V. Lunacharsky bypass the guard of honor, going to the place of laying the monument “Liberated Labor” on the Prechistenskaya embankment.RSFSR, Moscow. May 1, 1920.

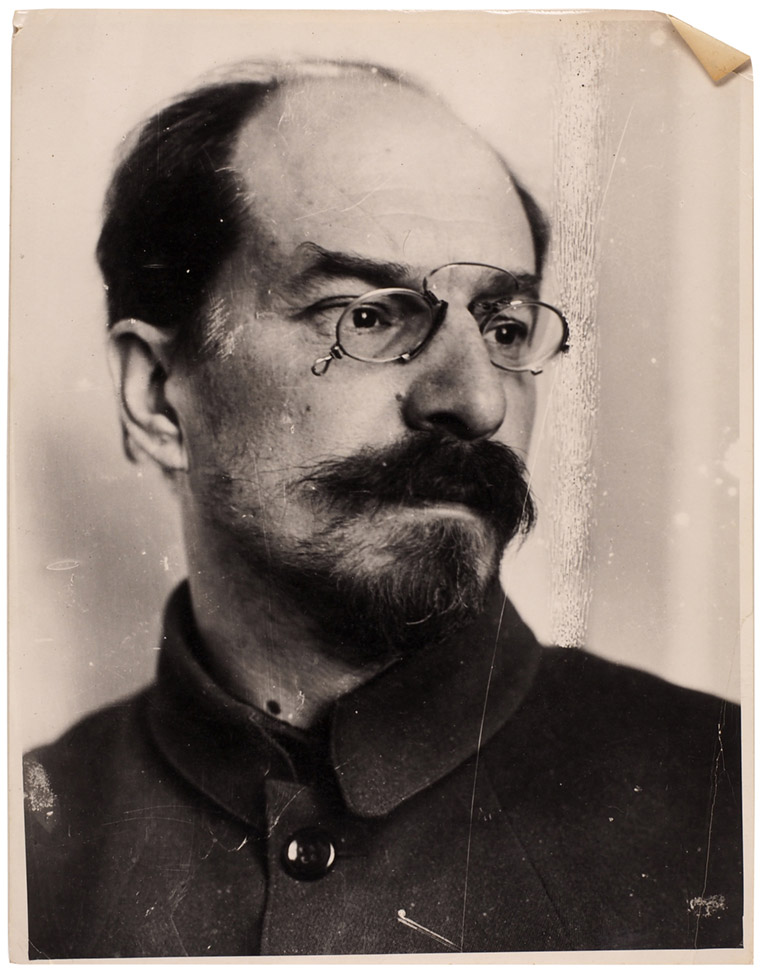
Lunacharsky c. 1923

After the October Revolution of 1917, Lunacharsky was appointed head of the People's Commissariat for Education (Narkompros) in the first Soviet government. On 15 November, after eight days in this post, he resigned in protest over a rumour that the Bolsheviks had bombarded St Basil's Cathedral on Red Square while they were storming the Kremlin, but after two days he withdrew his resignation. After the creation of the Soviet Union, he was People's Commissar for Enlightenment, which was a function devolved to the union republics, for the Russian Federation only.

Lunacharsky opposed the decision in 1918 to transfer Russia's capital to Moscow and stayed for a year in Petrograd (now Saint Petersburg) and left the running of his commissariat to his deputy, Mikhail Pokrovsky.

=== Education ===
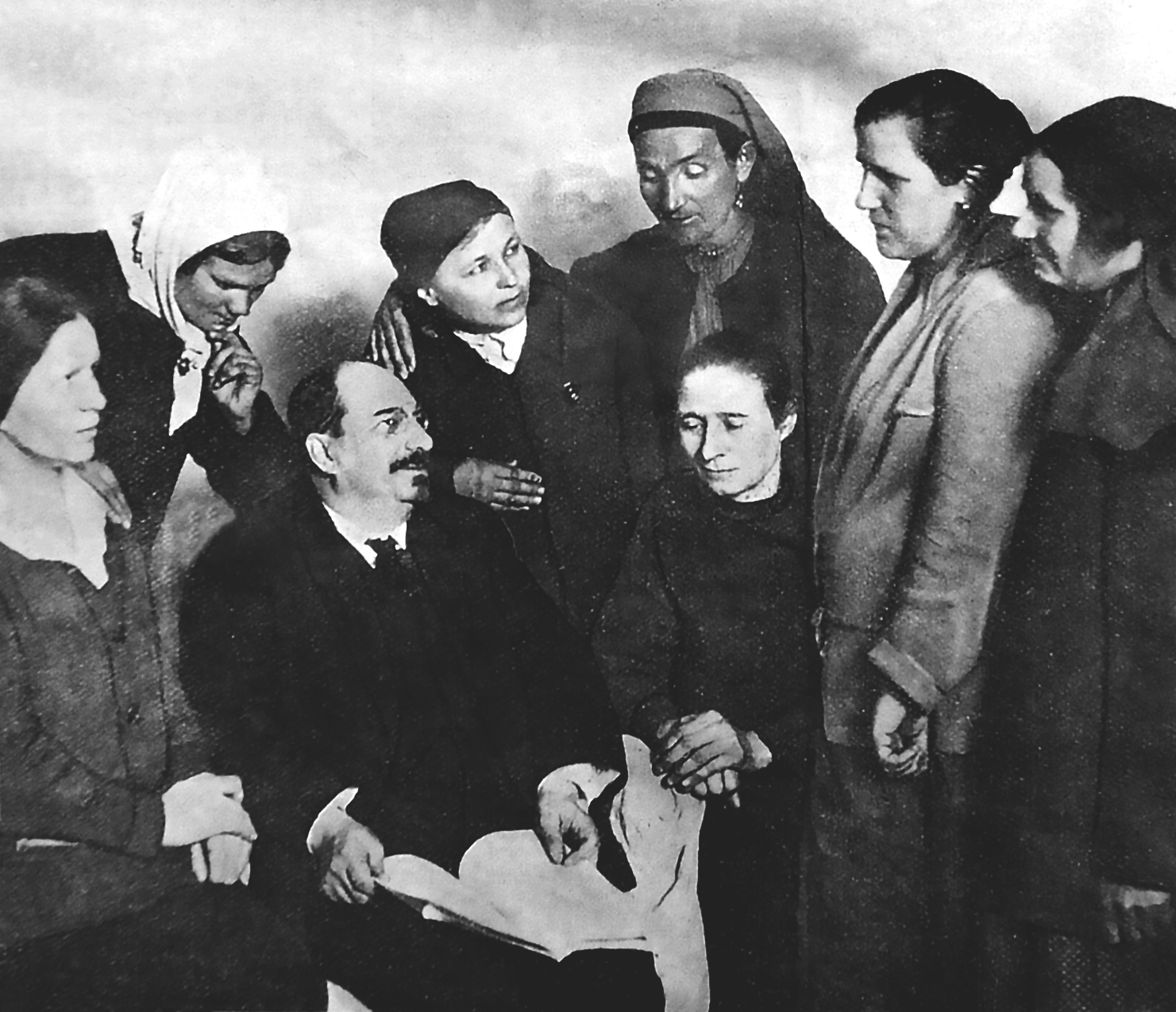
Lunacharsky, People's Commissar for Education, at the 13th All-Russian Congress of Soviets, April 1927

On 10 November 1917, Lunacharsky signed a decree making school education a state monopoly at local government level and said that his department would not claim central power over schools. In December, he ordered church schools to be brought under the jurisdiction of local Soviets.

He faced determined opposition from the teachers' union. In February 1918, the fourth month of a teachers' strike, he ordered all teachers to report to their local soviets and to stand for re-election to their jobs. In March, he reluctantly disbanded the union and sequestered its funds. Largely because of the opposition from teachers, he had to abandon his scheme for local autonomy.

He also believed in polytechnic schools, in which children could learn a range of basic skills, including manual skills, with specialist training beginning in late adolescence. All children were to have the same education and would automatically qualify for higher education, but opposition from Trotsky and others later compelled him to agree that specialist education would begin in secondary schools.

In July 1918, he proposed that all university lecturers should be elected for seven-year terms, irrespective of their academic qualifications, that all courses would be free, and that institutions would be run by elected councils made of staff and students. His ideas were vigorously opposed by academics.

In June 1919, The New York Times decried Lunacharsky's efforts in education in an article entitled "Reds Are Ruining Children of Russia". It claimed that he was instilling a "system of calculated moral depravity [...] in one of the most diabolical of all measures conceived by the Bolshevik rulers of Russia".

=== Culture ===
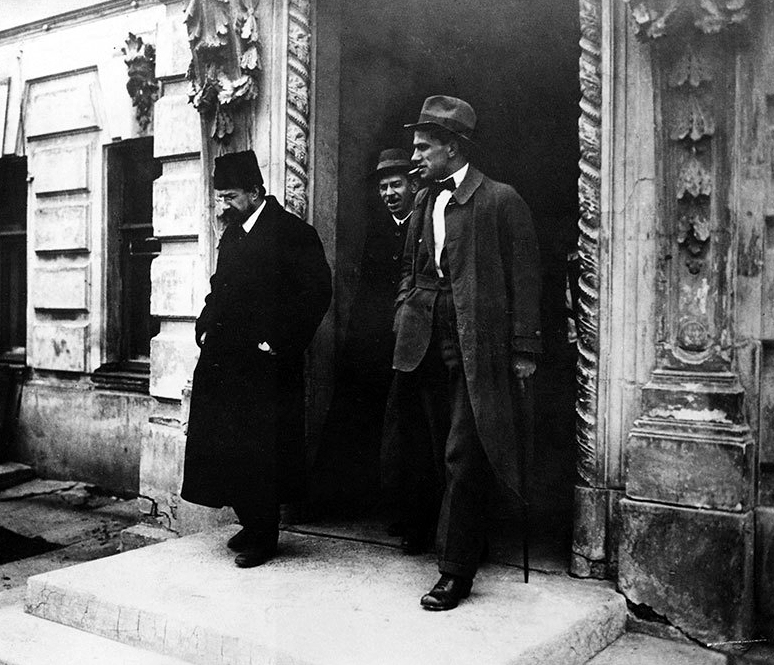
Lunacharsky alongside Vladimir Mayakovsky in 1924

A week before the October Revolution, Lunacharsky convened and presided over a conference of proletarian cultural and educational organisations, at which the independent art movement Proletkult was launched, with Lunacharsky's former colleague, Bogdanov, as its leading figure. In October 1920, he clashed with Lenin, who insisted on bringing Proletkult under state control. But though he believed in encouraging factories to create literature or art, he did not share the hostility to "bourgeois" art forms exhibited by RAPP and other exponents of proletarian art.

In the week after the revolution, he invited everyone in Petrograd involved in cultural or artistic work to a meeting at Communist Party headquarters. Although the meeting was widely advertised, no more than seven people turned up, though they included Alexander Blok, Vladimir Mayakovsky, Vsevolod Meyerhold and Larissa Reissner.

==== Art ====
Lunacharsky directed some of experiments in public arts after the Revolution, such as the agit-trains and agit-boats that circulated over all Russia spreading Revolution and revolutionary arts. He also gave support to constructivism's experiments and the initiatives such as the ROSTA Windows, revolutionary posters designed and written by Mayakovsky, Rodchenko and others. With his encouragement, 36 new art galleries were opened in 1918-21.

==== Cinema ====
Mayakovsky stimulated his interest in cinema, then a new art form. Lunacharsky wrote an "agit-comedy", which was filmed in the streets of Petrograd for the first anniversary of the Bolshevik revolution. Soon afterwards, he nationalised the film industry and founded the State Film School. In 1920, he told George Lansbury: "So far, cinemas are not much use owing to shortage of materials. ... When these difficulties are removed ... the story of humanity will be told in pictures". He also wrote scrips for several agitprop films, such as Cohabitation (1918).

==== Theatre ====
In the early 1920s, theatre appears to have been the art form to which Lunacharsky attached the greatest importance. In 1918, when most Bolsheviks despised experimental art, Lunacharsky praised Mayakovsky's play Mystery-Bouffe, directed by Meyerhold, which he described as "original, powerful and beautiful". But his main interest was not experimental theatre. During the civil war, he wrote two symbolic dramas, The Magi and Ivan Goes to Heaven, and a historical drama Oliver Cromwell. In July 1919, he took personal charge of the theatre administration from Olga Kameneva, with the intention of reviving realism on stage.

Lunacharsky was associated with the establishment of the Bolshoi Drama Theater in 1919, working with Maxim Gorky, Alexander Blok and Maria Andreyeva. He also played a part in persuading the Moscow Art Theatre (MAT) and its renowned directors Konstantin Stanislavski and Vladimir Nemirovich-Danchenko to end their opposition to the regime and resume productions. In January 1922 he protested vigorously after Lenin had ordered that the Bolshoi Ballet was to be closed, and succeeded in keeping it open.

In 1923 he launched a Back to Ostrovsky movement to mark the centenary of Russia's first great playwright. He was also personally involved in the decision to allow the MAT to stage Mikhail Bulgakov's first play, The Days of the Turbins (usually known by its original title, The White Guard)

==== Literature ====
Despite his belief in 'proletarian' literature, Lunacharsky also defended writers who were not experimental, nor even sympathetic to the Bolsheviks. He also helped Boris Pasternak. In 1924, Pasternak's wife wrote to his cousin saying "so far, Lunacharsky has never refused to see Borya".

==== Music ====
Lunacharsky was the first Bolshevik to recognise the value of the composer Sergei Prokofiev, whom he met in April 1918, after the premiere of his Classical Symphony. In 1926, he wrote "the freshness and rich imagination characteristic of Prokofiev attest to his exceptional talent". He arranged a passport that allowed Prokofiev to leave Russia, then in July 1925 he persuaded the Central Committee of the Communist Party of the Soviet Union to invite Prokofiev, Igor Stravinsky, and the pianist Alexander Borovsky to return to Russia. Stravinsky and Borovsky rejected the offer, but Prokofiev was given permission to come and go freely while Lunacharsky was in office. In February 1927, he sat with Prokofiev during the first Russian performance of The Love for Three Oranges, which he compared to "a glass of champagne, all sparkling and frothy".

In 1929, Lunacharsky supported a change in the Russian alphabet, latinizing it from Cyrillic to Latin.

== Personality ==
Though he was influential in setting Soviet policy on culture and education, particularly in the early years while Lenin was alive, Lunacharsky was not a powerful figure. Trotsky described him as "a man always easily infected by the moods of those around him, imposing in appearance and voice, eloquent in a declamatory way, none too reliable, but often irreplaceable." But Ilya Ehrenburg wrote: "I was struck by something different: he was not a poet, he was engrossed in political activity, but an extraordinary love of art burned in him", and Nikolai Sukhanov, who knew him well, wrote that

The great people of the revolution - both his comrades and his opponents - almost always spoke of Lunacharsky with sneers, irony or scorn. Though a most popular personality and minister, he was kept away from high policy: 'I have no influence,' he once told me himself ... But that is his historical role; for the brilliance of talent, to say nothing of culture, he has no equal in the constellation of Bolshevik leaders.

== Later career ==
Lunacharsky avoided taking sides when the Communist Party split after Lenin's death, but he almost became embroiled in the split by accident by publishing his selection of Revolutionary Silhouettes in 1923, which included portraits of Trotsky, Zinoviev, and Martov, but failed to mention Stalin. Later, he offended Trotsky by saying at an event in the Bolshoi Theatre to commemorate the second anniversary of Lenin's death, that "they" (he did not say who) were willing to offer Trotsky "a crown on a velvet cushion" and "hail him as Lev I".

After about 1927, he was losing control over cultural policy to Stalinists like Leopold Averbakh. After he was removed from office, in 1929, Lunacharsky was appointed to the Learned Council of the Soviet Union Central Executive Committee. He also became an editor for the Literature Encyclopedia (published 1929–1939).

Lunacharsky represented the Soviet Union at the League of Nations from 1930 through 1932.

In 1930, he established a government commission to research satirical genres in all kinds of art.

In 1933, he was appointed ambassador to Spain, a post he never assumed, as he died en route.

=== Death ===
Lunacharsky died at 58 on 26 December 1933 in Menton, France, while travelling to Spain to take up the post of Soviet ambassador there, as the conflict that became the Spanish Civil War appeared increasingly inevitable.

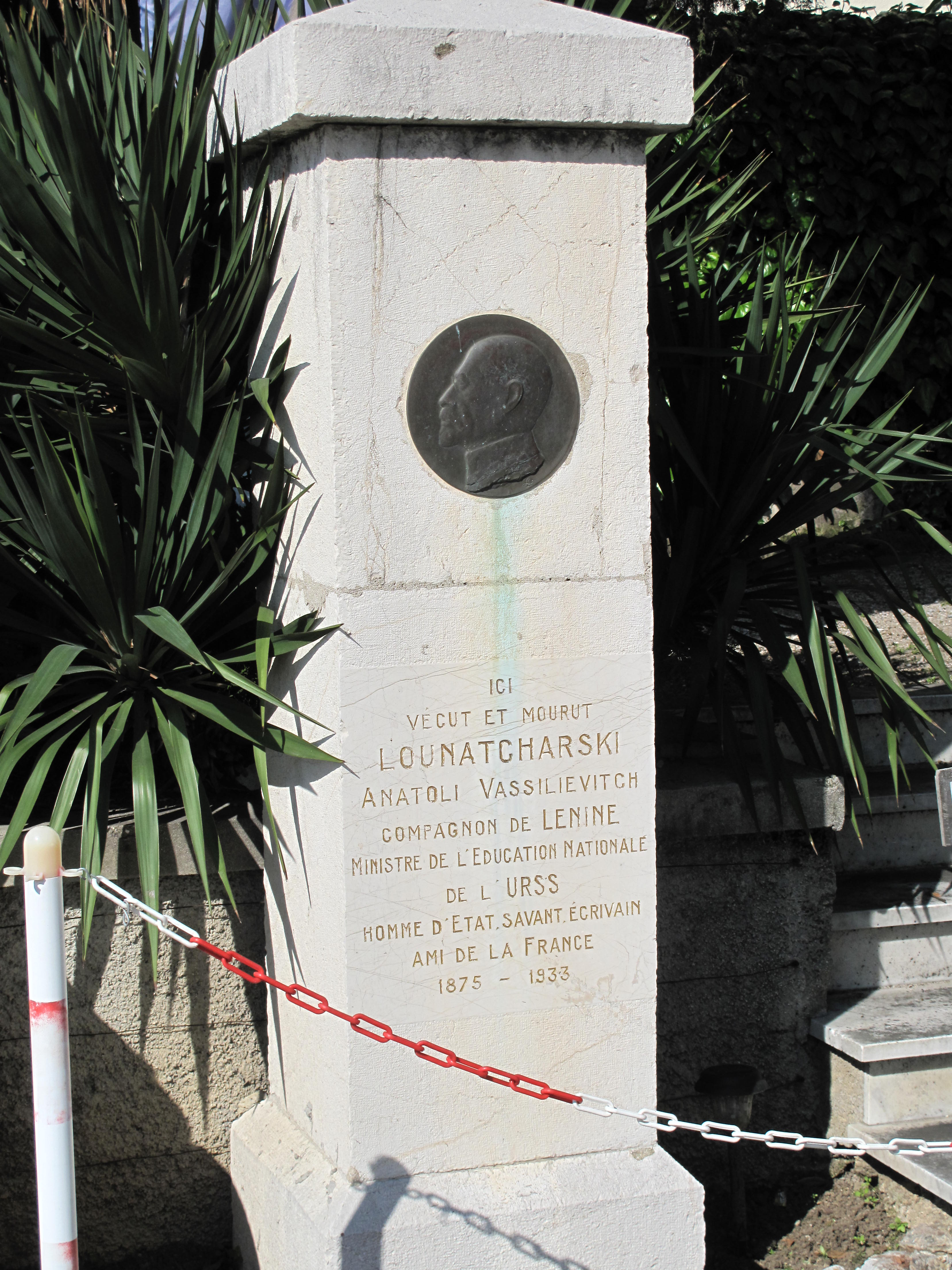
A monument to Lunacharsky in Menton, France

== Personal life ==
In 1902, he married Anna Alexandrovna Malinovskaya, Alexander Bogdanov's sister. They had one child, a daughter named Irina Lunacharsky. In 1922, he met Natalya Rozenel, an actress at the Maly Theatre. He left his family and married her. Sergei Prokofiev, who met her in 1927, described her as "one of his most recent wives", and as "a beautiful woman from the front, much less beautiful if you looked at her predatory profile". He claimed that Lunacharsky had previously been the lover of the ballerina Inna Chernetskaya.

Lunacharsky was known as an art connoisseur and a critic. Besides Marxist dialectics, he had been interested in philosophy since he was a student. For instance, he was fond of the ideas of Johann Gottlieb Fichte, Friedrich Nietzsche and Richard Avenarius. He could read six modern languages and two dead ones. Lunacharsky corresponded with H. G. Wells, Bernard Shaw and Romain Rolland. He met numerous other famous cultural figures such as Rabindranath Tagore and Nicholas Roerich.

Lunacharsky once described Nadezhda Krupskaya as the "soul of Narkompros" ( also known as the People's Commissariat for Education ).

Friends included Igor Moiseyev.

== Legacy ==
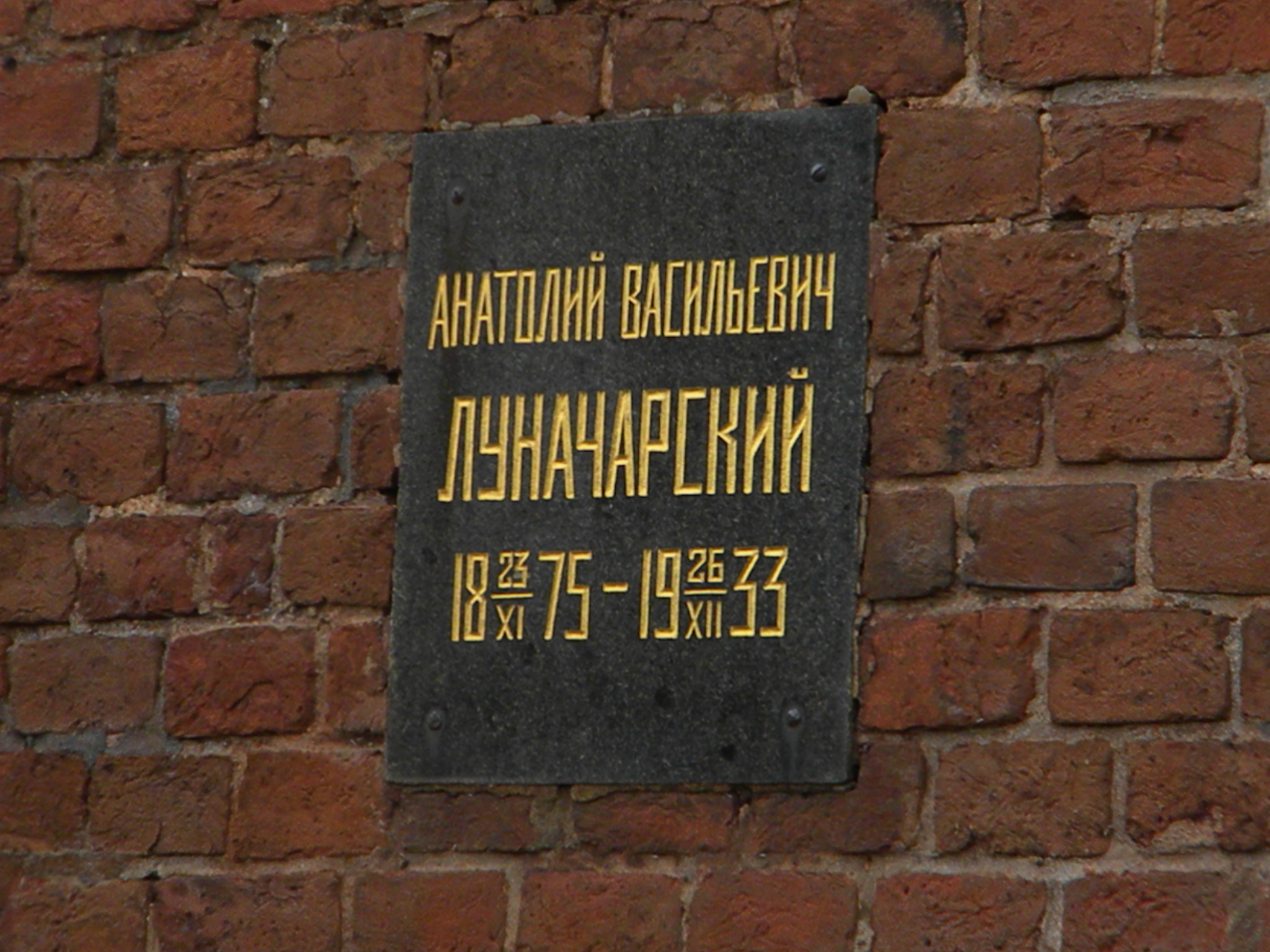
Grave of Anatoly Lunacharsky in the Kremlin Wall Necropolis

Lunacharsky's remains were returned to Moscow, where his urn was buried in the Kremlin Wall Necropolis, a rare privilege during the Soviet era. During the Great Purge of 1936–1938, Lunacharsky's name was erased from the Communist Party's history and his memoirs were banned. A revival came in the late 1950s and 1960s, with a surge of memoirs about Lunacharsky and many streets and organizations named or renamed in his honour. During that era, Lunacharsky was viewed by the Soviet intelligentsia as an educated, refined and tolerant Soviet politician.

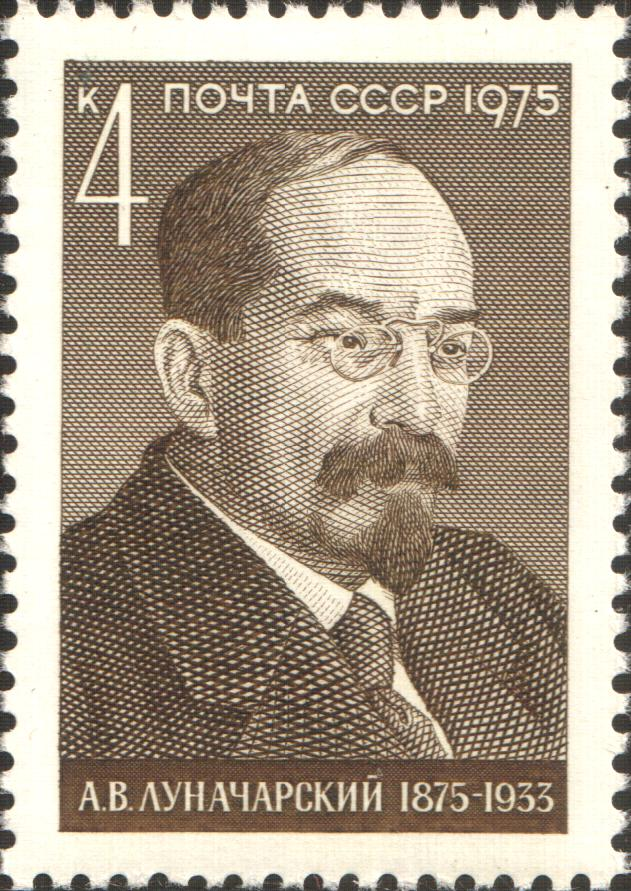
Soviet stamp portraying Lunacharsky in 1979

In the 1960s, his daughter Irina Lunacharsky helped revive his popularity. Several streets and institutions were named in his honour.

In 1971, Asteroid 2446 was named after Lunacharsky.

Some Soviet-built orchestral harps also bear the name of Lunacharsky, presumably in his honour. These concert pedal harps were produced in Leningrad (now Saint Petersburg, Russia).

The New York Times dubbed Nikolai Gubenko, last culture commissar of the Soviet Union, "the first arts professional since Anatoly V. Lunacharsky" because he seemed to "identify" with Lunacharsky.

== Works ==
Lunacharsky was also a prolific writer. He wrote literary essays on the works of several writers, including Alexander Pushkin, George Bernard Shaw and Marcel Proust. However, his most notable work is his memoirs, Revolutionary Silhouettes, which describe anecdotes and Lunacharsky's general impressions of Lenin, Leon Trotsky and eight other revolutionaries. Trotsky reacted to some of Lunacharsky's opinions in his own autobiography, My Life.

In the 1920s, Lunacharsky produced Lyubov Popova's The Locksmith and the Chancellor at the Comedy Theater.

Some of his works include:

- Outlines of a Collective Philosophy (1909)
- Self-Education of the Workers: The Cultural Task of the Struggling Proletariat (1918)
- Three Plays (1923)
- Revolutionary Silhouettes (1923)
- Theses on the Problems of Marxist Criticism (1928)
- Vladimir Mayakovsky, Innovator (1931)
- George Bernard Shaw (1931)
- Maxim Gorky (1932)
- On Literature and Art (1965)

== See also ==
- Outline of the Russian Revolution and Civil War
- Bibliography of the Russian Revolution and Civil War
- Bibliography of Stalinism and the Soviet Union
- Index of Old Bolsheviks
- Index of articles related to the Russian Revolution and Civil War
- God-Building
- New Soviet man
- Working-class culture
- Proletkult
- Proletarian literature
- Proletarian novel
