= Sergei Suvorov =

Statistician, philosopher and revolutionary from the Russian Empire

Sergei Alexandrovich Suvorov (Russian: Сергей Александрович Суворов; 1869 – 15 June 1918) was a statistician, philosopher and revolutionary from the Russian Empire.

Suvorov was attracted to the revolutionary movement in the 1890s and he participated in a Marxist study circle with Nikolai Fedoseev. He joined the Russian Social Democratic Labour Party (RSDLP) in 1900. He took part in the 1905 Revolution. He was a delegate to the 4th Congress of the RSDLP in 1906. Here he spoke about the Agrarian programme. He was one of the Russian Machists contributing several works to the philosophical debate including Studies in the Philosophy of Marxism.

He was a member of the Yaroslavl Soviet of Workers' Deputies. He died in the fighting in that city during the Russian Civil War.
