= Sverdlovsky District, Russia =

Set of Russian districts

Sverdlovsky District is the name of several administrative and municipal districts in Russia. The districts are generally named after Yakov Sverdlov, a Bolshevik party leader.

== Districts of the federal subjects ==
Location of Oryol Oblast in Russia

- Sverdlovsky District, Oryol Oblast, an administrative and municipal district of Oryol Oblast

== City divisions ==
- Sverdlovsky City District, Irkutsk, a city district of Irkutsk, the administrative center of Irkutsk Oblast
- Sverdlovsky City District, Krasnoyarsk, a city district of Krasnoyarsk, the administrative center of Krasnoyarsk Krai
- Sverdlovsky City District, Perm, a city district of Perm, the administrative center of Perm Krai
Cities in Russia with a city division called "Sverdlovsky"

== See also ==
- Sverdlovsky (disambiguation)
- Sverdlovsk (disambiguation)
- Sverdlov (disambiguation)
