= Lists of members of the Politburo of the Communist Party of the Soviet Union =

Lists of members of the Politburo of the Communist Party of the Soviet Union include:

- Aug.–Oct. 1917
- Oct.–Dec. 1917
- 6th (1917–18)
- 7th (1918–19)
- 8th (1919–20)
- 9th (1920–21)
- 10th (1921–22)
- 11th Politburo (1922–1923)
- 12th Politburo (1923–1924)
- 13th Politburo (1924–1925)
- 14th Politburo (1926–1927)
- 15th Politburo (1927–1930)
- 16th Politburo (1930–1934)
- 17th Politburo (1934–1939)
- 18th Politburo (1939–1952)
- 19th Politburo (1952–1956)
- 20th and 21st Politburo (1956–1961)
- 22nd Politburo (1961–1966)
- 23rd Politburo (1966–1971)
- 24th Politburo (1971–1976)
- 25th Politburo (1976–1981)
- 26th Politburo (1981–1986)
- 27th Politburo (1986–1990)
- 28th Politburo (1990–1991)
