= Sverdlovo =

Sverdlovo is the name of several rural localities in Russia:

- Sverdlovo, Leningrad Oblast, a rural locality in Leningrad Oblast
- Sverdlovo, name of several other rural localities

== See also ==
- Sverdlove, the Ukrainian cognate term
- Sverdlovsk (disambiguation)
- Sverdlovsky (disambiguation)
- Yakov Sverdlov
