= 8th Congress of the Russian Communist Party (Bolsheviks) =

1919 party congress in Russia

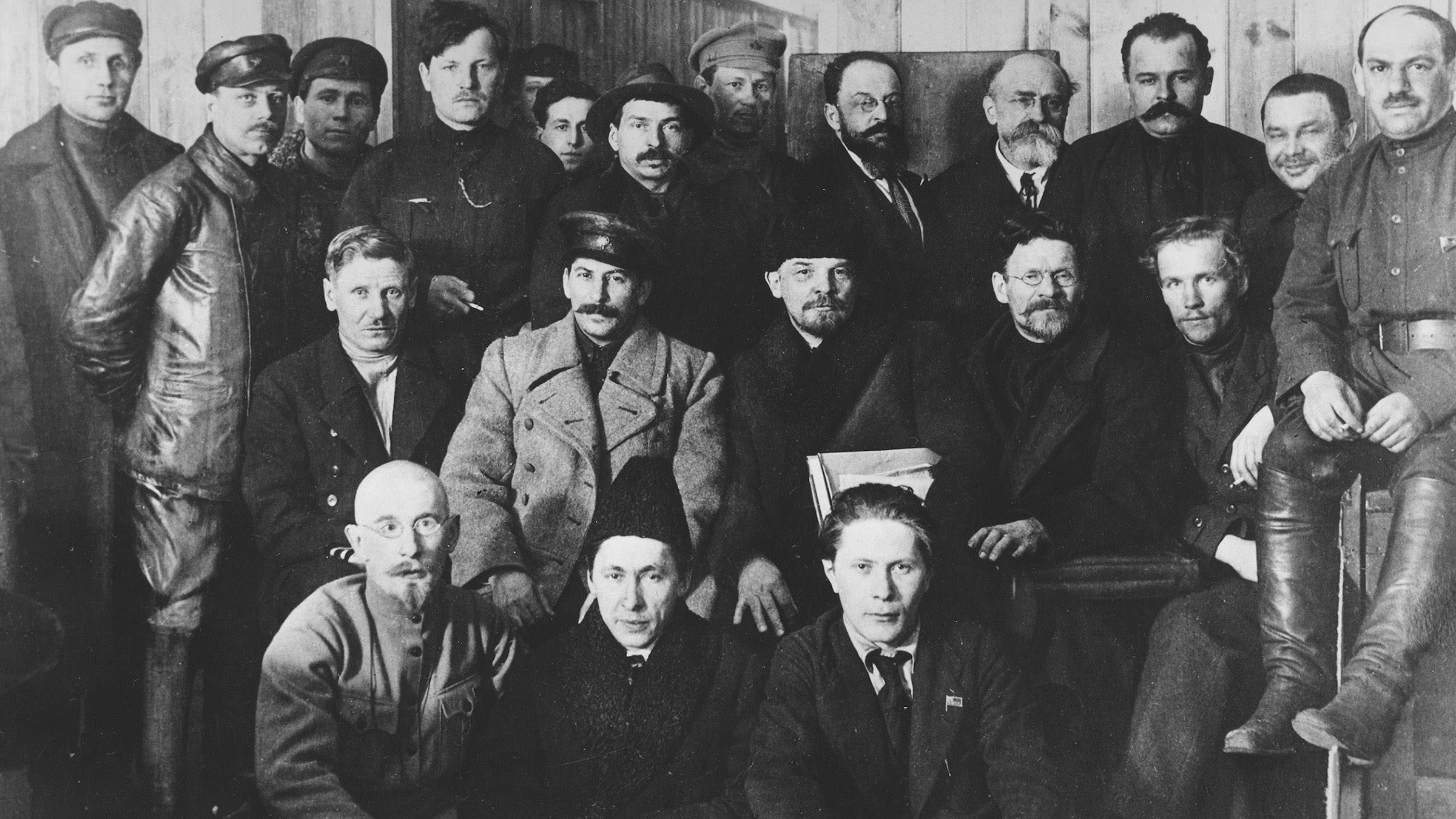
Delegates to the 8th Congress of the Russian Communist Party (Bolsheviks)

The 8th Congress of the Russian Communist Party (Bolsheviks) [RKP(b)] was held in Moscow 18–23 March 1919. This marked the second annual congress of the Bolshevik Party since the organization's October 1917 seizure of power.

The Congress was attended by 301 voting delegates and 102 delegates attended with speaking rights, but no vote, representing 313,766 members of the Communist Party. It elected a 27-member Central Committee, which in turn elected a 9-member Politburo.

The Congress received a report on the previous year's activities of the Central Committee, debated and passed a new party program, and engaged in protracted discussion regarding agriculture and the military situation, among other topics, before passing a group of binding resolutions.

== Background ==
The 8th Congress of the Russian Communist Party (Bolsheviks) [RKP(b)] came amidst the ongoing Russian Civil War with Soviet Russia on the verge of an economic collapse wrought by the chaos and disorganization of War Communism and a hyperinflationary devaluation of the currency. The gathering closely followed the Founding Convention of the Communist International, which was held in Moscow from 2–6 March 1919.

Held in Moscow over six days, from 18–23 March, the 8th Congress was the second governing congress of Russian Communist Party held since the October 1917 uprising which had overthrown the Russian Provisional Government and dispersed the elected Constituent Assembly. It was attended by 301 voting delegates and 102 delegates with voice but no vote, representing a party membership stated at 313,766. (Note: The RKP(b) grew significantly over the rest of 1919, ending the year with 431,000 members — a gain of 37.3%. See: E.H. Carr, The Bolshevik Revolution, 1917–1923: Vol. 1, p. 205.) Delegates included representatives from border regions recently won back by Russia from the White Army in the Civil War, including Ukraine, Belorussia, Lithuania, and Latvia.

The 8th Congress of the RKP(b) was notable for adopting a new party program for the Bolshevik Party, which replaced the party's first program, adopted at the 2nd Congress of the Russian Social Democratic Labour Party in the summer of 1903. This was introduced to the delegates by party leader V.I. Lenin, who also delivered the keynote Report of the Central Committee as well as a report on Communist Party activity in the countryside. Lenin spoke eight times in all during the course of the Congress.

In the view of historian Mark von Hagen, the 8th Congress continued a trend started at the 6th Congress of Soviets in 1918 turning away from the utopian policies of the Bolsheviks' first year in power, with state and party officials tempering their "class war" rhetoric and attempting to appeal to all "conscious" citizens to defend the government in the ongoing civil war against a myriad of enemies, foreign and domestic. Civilian and military experts had been employed to administer the functions of government and to keep foodstuffs flowing to soldiers in the field and workers in the cities, and this decision was ratified. Similarly, and more controversially, the decision of People's Commissar for Military Affairs Leon Trotsky to employ military specialists to help conduct the operations of the Red Army gained the formal backing of the RKP(b).

== Agenda ==
The Congress agenda included the following matters:

- Report of the Central Committee
- Adoption of a new program of the RKP(b)
- On creation of the Communist International
- The war situation and military policy
- Work in the countryside
- Organizational questions
- Election of the Central Commiittee

== Main topics of the Congress ==
=== Report of the Central Committee ===
The report of the Central Committee (CC) was delivered to the gathering by V.I. Lenin on March 18, the first day of the congress. (Note: This report was not published in English until about 1935, when it appeared as part of a 12 volume set, Selected Works of V.I. Lenin. That translation, by A. Fineberg, is alternate to the George Hanna translation appearing in the Lenin Collected Works. See: Selected Works of V.I. Lenin: Vol. VIII, The Period of War Communism (1918–1920). New York: International Publishers, n.d. [c. 1935], pp. 26–44 and inside-front dust jacket panel.) Lenin stated that he believed a report of the activities of the CC was "tantamount to presenting a report on the whole of our revolution" and thus "beyond the powers of one individual" to exhaustively cover in a short time. He therefore announced his intention only to touch upon highlights of the activities of the party (and government) during the previous year.

Opening with foreign policy, Lenin began with the uneasy situation with Imperial Germany which followed signing of the Treaty of Brest-Litovsk — a "forced retreat" behind an "extremely oppressive, outrageous, and predatory peace." He renewed his sharp criticism of the Left Communist and Socialist-Revolutionaries who had opposed this strategic decision, declaring them to have taken a "fundamentally wrong and non-Marxist position despite their earnest professions of revolutionary fidelity. He also attacked the Mensheviks and other "petty-bourgeois democratic parties," accusing them of avacillating position "between the old society and the new" rendering them unable to reliably participate as full allies in the dictatorship of the proletariat.

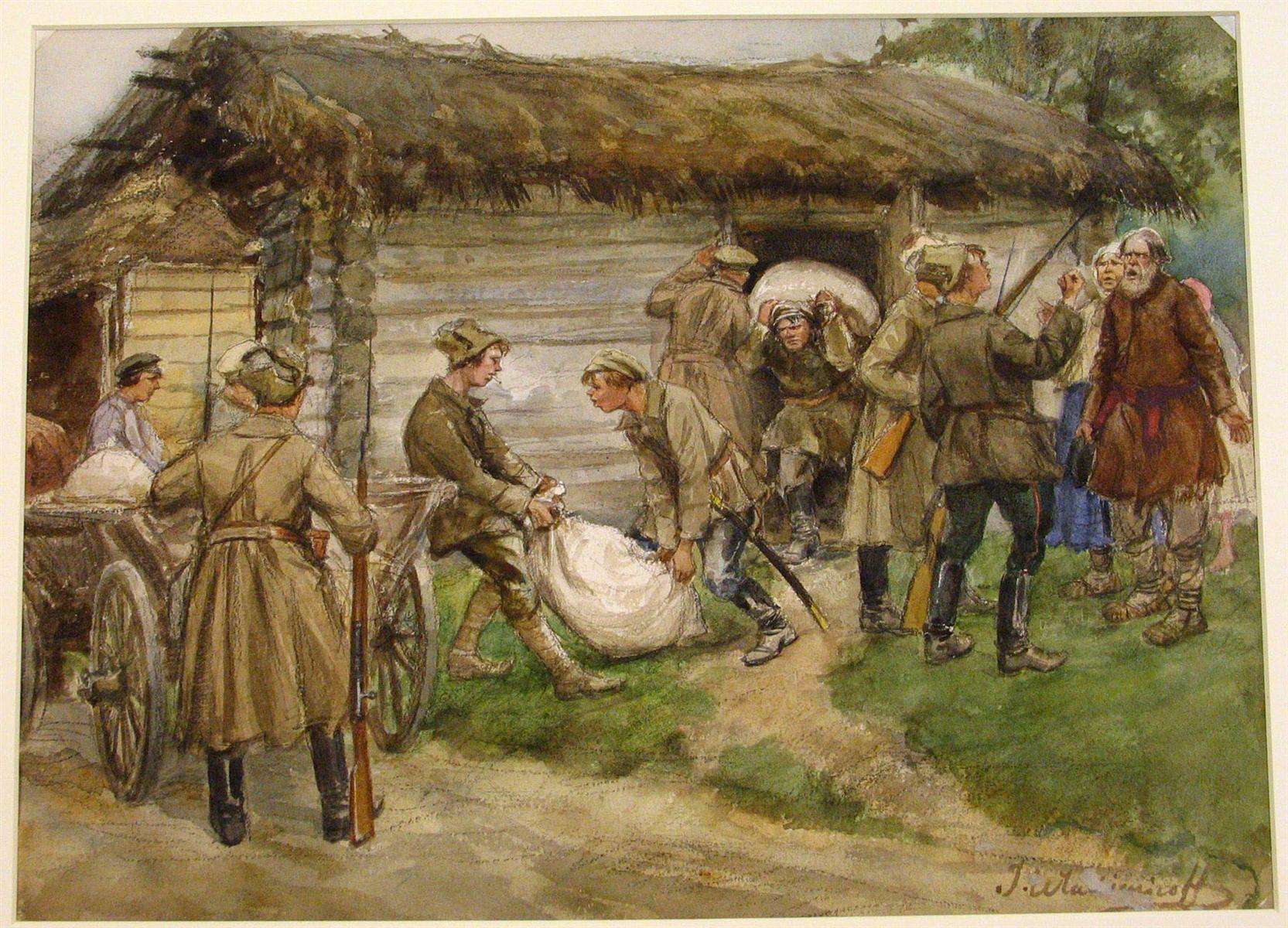
Prodrazvërstka. With a rapidly devaluing currency and few goods to exchange, grain requisitioning under War Communism resembled armed theft from the point of view of the peasantry.

As a result, Lenin declared, the Communists had moved into a "violent and ruthless clash" with the democratic parties, reflective of the fact that the party "shall have to change our line of conduct very often." Lenin continued:

"We have changed our tactics towards them, and whenever they turn towards us we say 'Welcome' to them. We have not the slightest intention of expropriating the middle peasants; we certainly do not want to use force against the petty-bourgeois democrats. We say to them, 'You are not a serious enemy. Our enemy is the bourgeoisie. But if you join forces with them, we shall be obliged to apply the [violent] measures of the proletarian dictatorship to you, too.'"

Lenin moved to the Red Army, created in the wake of dissolution of the old Russian army in the aftermath of the 1917 revolution. "The nature of the problem was clear — unless we defended the socialist republic by force of arms, we could not exist" as "a ruling class would never surrender its power to an oppressed class." The formation and maintenance of the Red Army was treated as an existential matter by Lenin, since "it is inconceivable for the Soviet Republic to exist alongside of the imperialist states for any length of time. One or the other must triumph in the end."

During the previous year the Bolsheviks had worked towards the construction of a strong and stable military through the use of so-called "bourgeois specialists," Lenin indicated — former officers and military organizational experts — and working to build revolutionary enthusiasm in the ranks.

Lenin was adamant that successful administration of the War Department had been based upon the use of "General Staff and the big specialists in organization," who "were disloyal to us, and will remain disloyal to us for many years to come." Those believing that "we can build communism" solely with "pure Communists, without the assistance of bourgeois experts" was "childish."

This situation was paralleled in industry, Lenin noted, in which the use of experts was a matter facing the Communist Party "at every turn."

With respect to agriculture and "the food question," characterized being perpetually "our most difficult problem," Lenin lauded the formation of Committees of Poor Peasants (kombedy) in the summer and fall of 1918 as a particular turning point. No specifics were provided about the inherent violence of forced food requisitioning (Prodrazvërstka), which would come to be disparagingly known as "kombed tactics" during the era of the New Economic Policy which was to emerge in the spring of 1921.

Lenin closed the report of the Central Committee with remarks on the middle peasantry (seredniaki), which he declared the party had sought to politically "neutralize" from "even before the revolution." Lenin stated that the Bolsheviks "were, are, and will be, in a state of open civil war with the kulaks (richest peasants)," but owing to "the inexperience of our Soviet officials," many of the "blows which were intended for the kulaks very frequently fell on the middle peasants." Lenin expressed a hope that "we can improve our administrative machinery and eliminate a host of abuses" so as to form a lasting bloc with the middle peasantry.

=== Party program ===
The 8th Congress officially replaced the first Bolshevik party program, which had been adopted at the 2nd Congress of the Russian Social Democratic Labour Party in 1903. The draft program brought to the March 1919 congress for approval had been prepared by a commission elected at the 7th Congress in 1918, with Lenin chairing this project.

Indeed, historian and Lenin biographer Robert Service has assigned the program a fundamental place for those attempting to examine Lenin's political ideas, calling it "predominantly his program." Service explains:

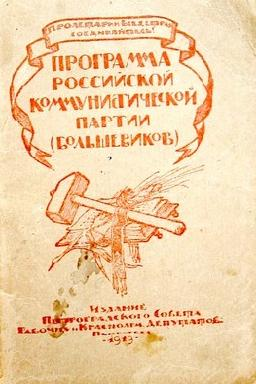
Party Program of the RKP(b), written by Lenin and adopted at the 8th Party Congress.

"He wrote the main draft and chaired the Congress commission which accepted it as a basis for discussion; and it was this draft, too, that was debated and sactioned by Congress. He proof-read it for publication as if he were the sole responsible author. He took his usual care... The program offers insight into the kind of society which he wanted to build. Not since The State and Revolution had he produced so comprehsive a medium-term statement, and his commitment to it was to outlast the Civil War."

The primary report on the program was delivered by Nikolai Bukharin, speaking on the behalf of the commission which composed the draft program. Bukharin's more or less bland report was followed by a secondary report by V.I. Lenin, revealing some divergence of opinion about the national question with Bukharin, with Lenin expressing a more liberal orientation on the national question, favoring ethnically based autonomous government administration on the part of the Bashkirs, Uzbeks, Tajiks, and other ethnic minority groups of the old Russian empire. Lenin's position drew fire from some delegates, who felt that world revolution was in the offing and that any allowances for nationalistic splitting of Soviet Russia would weaken revolutionary chances, and the matter was referred to a commission for decision.

Communist revolution was cast as a universalistic and inevitable process in the new program:

"Only the proletarian, communist revolution can lead humanity out of the impasse created by imperialism and imperialist wars. Whatever the difficulties of the revolution, its possible temporary setbacks, or the waves of counterrevolution, the final victory of the proletariat is inevitable.... This victory of the world proletarian revolution demands the utmost confidence, the closest fraternal alliance, and the greatest possible unity of revolutionary action by the working class in the advanced countries."

The new program defined imperialism for the first time and attempted to "expose" the "class nature of bourgeois democracy," heralding the Soviet system as a new and higher type of "democracy." The document also called for completing the expropriation of bourgeoisie and organizing the national economy around a unified and integrated plan. The program called for further development of the country's industrial base and for mobilizing trade unions to foster labor discipline, organizing workplaces to help enable rapid expansion of the socialist economy.

With respect to agriculture, the new program advocated integrating the small-scale peasantry into the process of socialist construction. While forms of large-scale collectivized agriculture were supported, it was acknowled that the form of organization most acceptable to the peasantry was the association for the joint cultivation of land (TOZ).

With respect to the national question, the new program set the goal of bringing together proletarians and semi-proletarians of various nationalities for a joint struggle to overthrow the landed aristocracy and the industrial bourgeoisie. Distrust needed to be overcome and fraternal relations fostered between the formerly dominant nation and the working people of previously oppressed nationalities. The program declared the need for full equality between nations and recognized the right of colonies to self-determination, up to and including secession.

=== Committee 1: The War and military policy ===
On the first day of the Congress, the Presidium, in accordance with the rules, determined to split the Congress into three working committees: military affairs, work in the countryside, and organizational matters. The debate around military affairs was the most controversial since disagreement over a return to the old "disciplined" model headed by military experts, including old tsarist officers, instead of 1918's volunteer Red Army was deeply resented by a group of delegates. A total of 82 delegates participated in the work of the committee.

The report on the war situation and the debate over military policy was held March 21 during a closed session of the 8th Congress on account of the sensitivity of this matter with the civil war at its height.

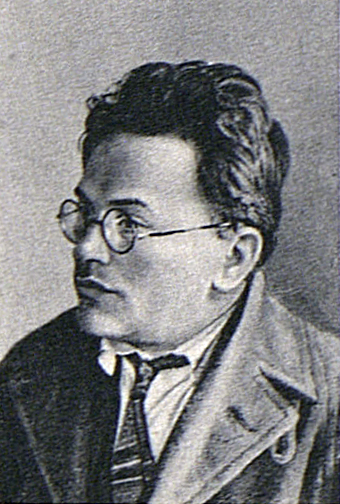
Georgy Safarov (1891–1942) was an opponent of the use of former tsarist officers.

During this debate a "military opposition" attempted to challenge People's Commisssar of Military Affairs Leon Trotsky's policy of making use of former tsarist officers to help conduct the operations of a conscription-based Red Army in the civil war. Some of the leading figures speaking out against the theses of the Central Committee supporting Trotsky's position, arguing againsts the use of potentially treacherous former military officers of the old regime, included Georgy Safarov, Georgy Piatakov, and Gavril Miasnikov.

Arguing against the volunteer army as part of this debate, in favor of the professionalism, use of military specialists, and strict discipline over conscript troops advocated by People's Commissar of the Military Leon Trotsky was his future nemesis, Joseph Stalin.

Although he was a top VKP(b) leader elected to the presidium of the Congress and returned again to membership on the Central Committee, and despite the fact that he sat on two of the working groups of the Congress — the 9-member Program Commission and the 5-member Military Commission— the published minutes of the 8th Congress do not record a single instance of Stalin speaking from the floor.

He did, however, speak at some length at the closed session of March 21, with the surviving fragment of his remarks first published in 1947 as part of the 13-volume Stalin Works. Stalin said, in part:

"The facts show that a volunteer army cannot stand the test of criticism, that we shall not be able to defend our Republic unless we create another armym a regular army, one infused with the spirit of discipline, possessing a competent political department and able and ready to rise at the first command and march against the enemy.

I must say that those non-working-class elements — the peasants — who constitute the majority in our army will not voluntarily fight for socialism.... Hence, our task is to re-educate these elements, infusing them with a spirit of iron discipline, to get them to follow the lead of the proletariat at the front as well as in the rear, to compel them to fight for our common socialist cause..."

The Military Commission of the Congress — consisting of Boris Pozern, Safarov, Stalin, Emelian Yaroslavsky, and Zinoviev — was responsible for writing the Party's final resolution on the matter, "On the Military Question," which was adopted unanimously.

=== Committee 2: Work in the countryside ===
Lenin's speech on the peasantry on the final day of the Congress was published as a crudely-printed pamphlet in Soviet Russia.

The Agricultural Committee (agrarnoe sektsii) met for three sessions during the 8th Congress. A total of 66 delegates participated in the work of the committee, making it the smallest of the three working groups of the Congress.

The Agricultural Committee began its work at the evening session of the third day of the Congress, March 20, with Anatoly Lunacharsky calling the meeting to order at 6:30 pm. The delegates participating in the section heard an extensive opening report on land policy delivered by Vasily Kuraev, who asserted that "the vast majority of the poorest and middle peasantry did not gain very much" from equalized land redistribution owing to the poor quality of land involved and low productivity of the strip agriculture then in practice. At the same time, Kuraev asserted, the richest elements of the village were negatively impacted by the trend towards equalization and sought to undermine the system, causing a new round of class antagonism within the peasantry.

In his report, Kuraev foreshadowed the large-scale, centralized, collectivized agriculture pursued by the Soviet state a decade hence:

"On one hand, the state concentrates the means of production and organizes them into large, rationally managed state enterprises. On the other, it is necessary to socialize the labor of small-scale producers and newly forming collectives, integrating them into the existing apparatus of the state-run, socialist national economy. This is the way in which the organization of socialist agriculture proceeds from above...

First and foremost, of course, the proletarian government and the Communist Party, which leads that government, must devote attention to the sovkhozy (state farms).... We must uphold the absolute superiority of the sovkhoz and of agricultural industry, organizing the latter along the lines of factory-based industry. We must organize our dairy, grain, and other such 'factories' in the same way that we organize our textile mills, metalworks, and all other types of industrial plants. State-run agricultural enterprises must be operated according to a single, rigorously developed plan, and the management of these sovkhozy must be centralized. There can be no room for anarchy in production within this sphere. We must concentrate all production, and our entire apparatus must be structured accordingly."

Despite such Utopian prescriptions, Kuraev harbored few illusions about the current reality in the countryside, however, acknowledging that "the middle peasantry, in particular, harbors hatred toward the Communist Party." Whereas, during the revolution "they may have criticized us" but "they still trusted us and did not want anyone else to take our place," things had changed. "If you go to the countryside today, you will see that [the middle peasants] despise us with all their might; this cannot be denied," Kuraev declared.

The second meeting of the committee was convened the following morning, March 21, as a closed session.

=== Committee 3: Organizational affairs ===
The relationship of the Communist Party and the Soviet state, which had been a matter of no concern before the October Revolution, was addressed by the 8th Congress of the RKP(b), which asserted the party's primacy in a resolution. This read:

"The Communist Party is the organization which unites in its ranks only the vanguard of the proletariat and of the poorest peasantry — that part of these classes which consciously strives to realize in practice the communist program....

== Daily activity ==
=== 18 March ===
The first session of the 8th Congress at 7:10 in evening of Tuesday, 18 March, with 263 delegates with decisive votes and 134 consultative delegates with voice but no vote present at the start. The gathering opened with Vladimir Lenin in the chair.

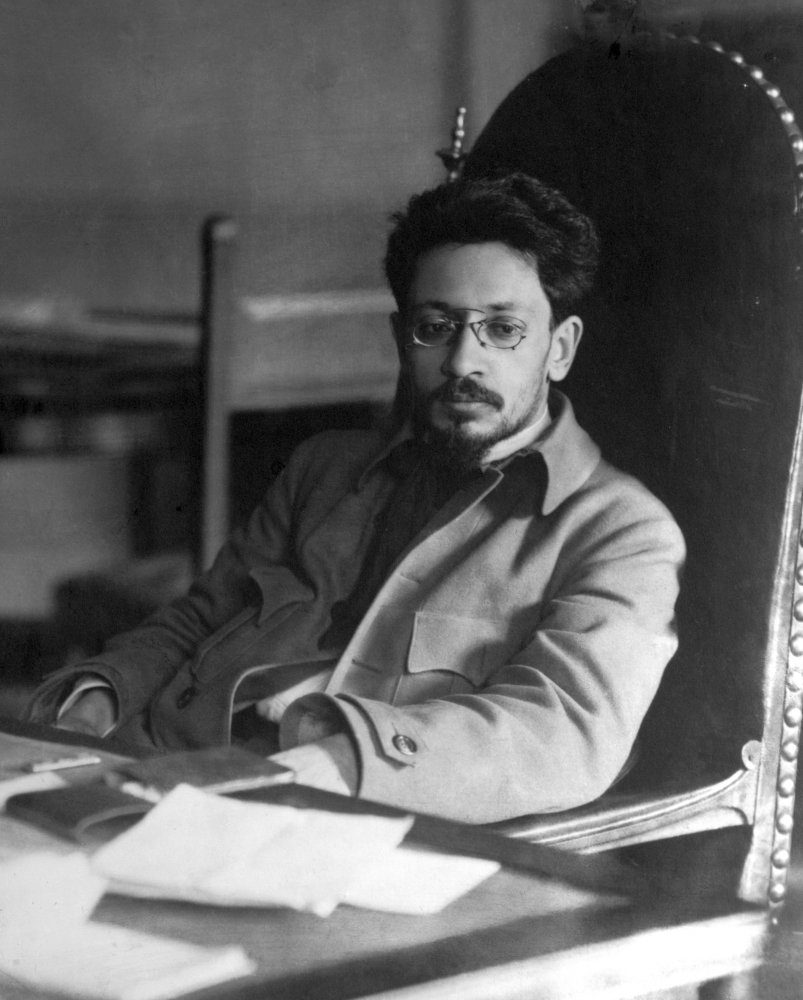
Yakov Sverdlov (1885–1919), a top Communist Party functionary, died just days before the 8th Congress.

Lenin's opening words to the congress were a eulogy dedicated to Yakov Sverdlov, who had died on 16 March, just two days before the start of the 8th Congress. Sverdlov was lauded as the principal national organizer for the Communist Party who had spent his last days preparing the congress then in session. The delegates were led to a moment of standing in Sverdlov's honor.

A presidium of the Congress was elected, which consisted, after a handful of declinations, of Lenin, Kamenev, Zinoviev, Piatakov, Evdokimov, Smidovich, Preobrazhensky, Muranov, and Stalin, with the latter two gaining nomination and election through floor nomination. Three secretaries were also elected — V.A. Avanesov, V.A. Vorobiev, and Safarov — as well as a seven member credentials committee.

A 7-item agenda for the Congress, prepared in advance and unsuccessful modified after a confusing flurry of motions from the floor, was approved by voice vote of the assembled delegates.

After approval of the agenda, Lev Kamenev was invited to take the floor to deliver brief remarks on the anniversary of the Paris Commune. Shortly thereafter, Lenin yielded the chair to his longtime associate in exile, Grigory Zinoviev, and took the floor in accordance with the first item on the agenda, delivering the lengthy keynote "Report of the Central Committee" to the delegates.

It was announced that the Presidium was dividing the Congress into three working committees, dealing with the war and military affairs, work in the countryside, and organizational affairs, respectively. With this the Congress adjourned at 9:55 pm.

=== 19 March ===
The second and third sessions of the 8th Congress were held on Wednesday, 19 March — one in the morning and one in the evening.

The congress adopted a new Party Program.

This program included a description of capitalism and imperialism, and compared two systems of state – the bourgeois-democratic system and the Soviet system. It specified the specific tasks of the Party in the struggle for socialism: completion of the expropriation of the bourgeoisie; administration of the economic life of the country in accordance with a single socialist plan; participation of the trade unions in the organization of the national economy; socialist labour discipline; utilization of bourgeois experts in the economic field under the control of Soviet bodies; gradual and systematic enlistment of the middle peasantry in the work of socialist construction.

=== 20 March ===
On March 20, Grigory Zinoviev delivered a report on the newly formed Communist International, passing along news from Germany along with a prediction that socialist revolution was in the offing.

Zinoviev's upbeat and inspirational review of the first days of the Comintern was followed by a more controversial report by Grigory Sokolnikov, who spoke on behalf of the theses on the Red Army written for the Congress by Leon Trotsky, who was not present owing to duties related to the ongoing civil war. Sokolnikov declared Trotsky's use of old tsarist military experts overseen by political commissars to have been shown to be a successful experiment, worthy of continuation. This was followed by a contrary report delivered by Vladimir Smirnov, himself a political commissar on the front, who presented a rival set of theses which challenged the return to strict discipline, special privileges enjoyed by officers, the lack of collective decision-making, and the throttling of power of the political commissars.

The debate was heated and Sokolnikov was defeated, with 37 of the 57 delegates participating in the Military Affairs Committee voting for the alternative theses advanced by Smirnov rather than supporting the position of Trotsky and the Central Committee. Sokolonikov and the defeated minority walked out, leaving the pieces to be picked up at a closed session of the full Congress the following day.

=== 21 March ===
The Congress met in closed session on March 21 to discuss the military situation and war policy. Ostensibly due to the "completely unrefined state of the secretarial notes," the discussion was not published in the stenographic record, either in the first edition published in 1919 nor in the reprint editions published in 1933 or 1959. The transactions were actually stenographically taken, however, and were finally published during the glasnost era, appearing in the official Communist Party magazine Izvestiia TsK KPSS [News of the CC of the CPSU] in November 1989.

=== 22 March ===
The Congress sent greetings to the Hungarian Soviet Republic:

"The Eighth Congress of the Russian Communist Party sends ardent greetings to the Hungarian Soviet Republic. Our Congress is convinced that the time is not far distant when communism will triumph all over the world. The working class of Russia is making every effort to come to your aid. The proletariat throughout the world is watching your struggle with intense interest and will not permit the imperialists to raise their hands against the new Soviet Republic."

=== 23 March ===
Lenin delivered a report on the Bolshevik Party's relationship with the peasantry on the final day of the Congress, March 23.

== Decisions of the Congress ==
=== Elections during the Congress ===
There were a total of people elected to the Central Committee of the RKP(b), 19 full members and 8 "candidate" members with voice but no vote.

These were:

Full members (19)

- Alexander Beloborodov
- Nikolai Bukharin ‡
- Felix Dzerzhinsky
- Mikhail Kalinin ‡
- Lev Kamenev †
- Nikolay Krestinsky †
- Vladimir Lenin †
- Matvei Muranov
- Karl Radek
- Christian Rakovsky
- Leonid Serebryakov
- Ivar Smilga
- Joseph Stalin †
- Elena Stasova ‡
- Peter Stuchka
- Mikhail Tomsky
- Leon Trotsky †
- Grigory Yevdokimov
- Grigory Zinoviev ‡

Candidate members (8)

- Andrei Bubnov
- Karl Danishevsky
- Vincas Mickevičius (Kapsukas)
- Vasily Schmidt
- Fëdor Sergeev
- Ivan Smirnov
- Mikhail Vladimirsky
- Emelian Yaroslavsky

Note: † - denotes full member of Politburo. ‡ - denotes candidate member of Politburo.

=== Resolutions and Decisions ===
The full text of these resolutions appears in Russian in the standard reference collection, CPSU in Resolutions and Decisions of the Congresses, Conferences, and Plenary Sessions of the CC.

- On the Report of the Central Committee
- On the Draft Program
- Program of the Russian Communist Party (Bolsheviks)
- On the Military Question
- On the Organizational Question
- On Relations with the Middle Peasantry
- On Political Propaganda and Cultural Enlightenment Work in the Countryside
- On Work with the Female Proletariat
- On Work with Youth
- On the Party and Soviet Press
