= Sverdlovsky District =

Sverdlovsky District may refer to:

- Sverdlov District, Bishkek (Sverdlovsky District), a city district of Bishkek, Kyrgyzstan
- Sverdlovsky District, Russia, several districts and city districts in Russia
- Sverdlovsk Raion (Sverdlovsky District), a district of Luhansk Oblast, Ukraine

== See also ==
- Sverdlovsky (disambiguation)
- Sverdlovsk (disambiguation)
- Sverdlov (disambiguation)
