= Orgburo of the 8th Congress of the Russian Communist Party (Bolsheviks) =

1919–20 party body

The 8th Orgburo of the Russian Communist Party (Bolsheviks) was elected by the 1st Plenary Session of the 8th Central Committee, in the immediate aftermath of the 8th Congress.

== Full members ==
| Name (birth–death) | Took office | Left office | Duration | Note |
|---|---|---|---|---|
| Alexander Beloborodov (1891–1938) | 25 March 1919 | 11 October 1919 | 200 days | Relieved of his duties. |
| Nikolay Krestinsky (1883–1938) | 25 March 1919 | 5 April 1920 | 1 year, 11 days | — |
| Leonid Serebryakov (1890–1937) | 25 March 1919 | 5 April 1920 | 1 year, 11 days | — |
| Joseph Stalin (1878–1953) | 25 March 1919 | 5 April 1920 | 1 year, 11 days | — |
| Elena Stasova (1873–1966) | 25 March 1919 | 5 April 1920 | 1 year, 11 days | — |
| Felix Dzerzhinsky (1877–1926) | 13 August 1919 | 5 April 1920 | 236 days | — |
| Lev Kamenev (1883–1936) | 13 August 1919 | 5 April 1920 | 236 days | — |
| Christian Rakovsky (1873–1941) | 11 October 1919 | 5 April 1920 | 177 days | — |
| Leon Trotsky (1883–1940) | 8 November 1919 | 5 April 1920 | 149 days | — |
| Mikhail Kalinin (1875–1946) | 29 November 1919 | 5 April 1920 | 128 days | — |

== Candidate members ==
| Name (birth–death) | Took office | Left office | Duration | Note |
|---|---|---|---|---|
| Matvei Muranov (1873–1959) | 25 March 1919 | 5 April 1920 | 1 year, 11 days | — |
