= Central Committee of the 8th Congress of the Russian Communist Party (Bolsheviks) =

1919–1920 party leadership body

Central Committee of the 8th Congress

23 March 1919 – 5 April 1920
- Inner-groups: Politburo: 6 full & 3 candidates Secretariat: 3 members Orgburo: 9 full & 1 candidates

Candidates

The Central Committee (CC) composition was elected by the 8th Congress, and sat from 23 March 1919 until 5 April 1920. The CC 1st Plenary Session renewed the composition of the Politburo, Secretariat and the Organizational Bureau (OB) of the Russian Communist Party (Bolsheviks).

== Plenary sessions ==
Plenary sessions of the Central Committee
Plenum	Date	Length
1st Plenary Session	20 March 1919	1 day
2nd Plenary Session	25 March 1919	1 day
3rd Plenary Session	13 April 1919	1 day
4th Plenary Session	5 May 1919	1 day
5th Plenary Session	10–11 June 1919	2 days
6th Plenary Session	15 June 1919	1 day
7th Plenary Session	3–4 July 1919	2 days
8th Plenary Session	21, 26 September 1919	2 days
9th Plenary Session	29 November 1919	1 day
10th Plenary Session	31 January 1920	1 day
11th Plenary Session	6 February 1920	1 day

== Composition ==
=== Members ===
Members of the Central Committee of the 8th Congress of the Russian Communist Party (Bolsheviks)
Name	Cyrillic	7th CC	9th CC	Birth	Death	PM	Nationality	Gender	Portrait
Alexander Beloborodov	Александр Белобородов	New	Candidate	1891	1938	1907	Russian	Male	
Nikolai Bukharin	Никола́й Буха́рин	Old	Reelected	1888	1938	1906	Russian	Male	
Felix Dzerzhinsky	Фе́ликс Дзержи́нский	Old	Reelected	1877	1926	1906	Polish	Male	
Mikhail Kalinin	Михаил Калинин	New	Reelected	1875	1946	1898	Russian	Male	
Lev Kamenev	Лев Ка́менев	Old	Reelected	1883	1936	1901	Jewish-Russian (Note: His father was Jewish and his mother Russian)	Male	
Nikolay Krestinsky	Никола́й Крести́нский	Old	Reelected	1883	1938	1901	Ukrainian	Male	
Vladimir Lenin	Владимир Ленин	Old	Reelected	1870	1924	1898	Russian	Male	
Matvei Muranov	Матвей Муранов	New	Candidate	1873	1959	1904	Ukrainian	Male	
Karl Radek	Карл Радек	New	Reelected	1885	1939	1903	Jewish	Male	
Christian Rakovsky	Христиан Раковский	New	Reelected	1873	1941	1917	Bulgarian	Male	
Leonid Serebryakov	Леонид Серебряков	New	Reelected	1890	1937	1905	Russian	Male	
Ivar Smilga	Ивар Смилга	Old	Candidate	1892	1937	1907	Latvian	Male	
Joseph Stalin	Ио́сиф Ста́лин	Old	Reelected	1878	1953	1898	Georgian	Male	
Elena Stasova	Еле́на Ста́сова	Old	Not	1873	1966	1898	Russian	Female	
Pēteris Stučka	Пётр Сту́чка	Candidate	Candidate	1865	1932	1906	Latvian	Male	
Mikhail Tomsky	Михаил Томский	New	Reelected	1880	1936	1904	Russian	Male	
Leon Trotsky	Лев Тро́цкий	Old	Reelected	1879	1940	1917	Jewish	Male	
Grigory Yevdokimov	Григорий Евдокимов	New	Not	1884	1936	1903	Russian	Male	
Grigory Zinoviev	Григо́рий Зино́вьев	Old	Reelected	1883	1936	1901	Jewish	Male	

=== Candidates ===
Candidate Members of the Central Committee of the 8th Congress of the Russian Communist Party (Bolsheviks)
Name	Cyrillic	7th CC	9th CC	Birth	Death	PM	Nationality	Gender	Portrait
Andrei Bubnov	Андрей Бубнов	New	Not	1884	1938	1903	Russian	Male	
Jūlijs Daniševskis	Владимир Милютин	New	Not	1884	1937	1906	Latvian	Male	
Vincas Mickevičius	Винцас Мицкявичюс	New	Not	1880	1935	1906	Lithuanian	Male	
Vasily Schmidt	Василий Шмидт	Member	Not	1886	1938	1905	German	Male	
Fyodor Sergeyev	Фёдор Серге́ев	Member	Member	1895	1921	1914	Russian	Male	
Ivan Smirnov	Иван Смирнов	New	Member	1881	1936	1899	Russian	Male	
Mikhail Vladimirsky	Михаи́л Влади́мирский	Member	Not	1874	1951	1898	Russian	Male	
Yemelyan Yaroslavsky	Емельян Ярославский	New	Candidate	1878	1943	1898	Jewish	Male	
