= Sverdlovsky =

Sverdlovsky (masculine), Sverdlovskaya (feminine), or Sverdlovskoye (neuter) may refer to:

- Sverdlovsk Oblast (Sverdlovskaya oblast), a federal subject of Russia
- Sverdlovsky District, several districts in the countries of the former Soviet Union
- Sverdlovsky Urban Settlement, a municipal formation which the Work Settlement of Sverdlovsky in Shchyolkovsky District of Moscow Oblast, Russia is incorporated as
- Sverdlovskoye Urban Settlement, a municipal formation corresponding to Sverdlovskoye Settlement Municipal Formation, an administrative division of Vsevolozhsky District of Leningrad Oblast, Russia
- Sverdlovsky (inhabited locality) (Sverdlovskaya, Sverdlovskoye), several inhabited localities in Russia

== See also ==
- Sverdlov (disambiguation)
- Sverdlovo
- Sverdlovsk (disambiguation)
