= Sverdlovsky (inhabited locality) =

Sverdlovsky (Russian: Свердловский; masculine), Sverdlovskaya (Свердловская; feminine), or Sverdlovskoye (Свердловское; neuter) is the name of several inhabited localities in Russia.

Urban localities

- Sverdlovsky, Moscow Oblast, a work settlement in Shchyolkovsky District of Moscow Oblast

Rural localities

- Sverdlovsky, Kemerovo Oblast, a settlement in Podgornovskaya Rural Territory of Leninsk-Kuznetsky District of Kemerovo Oblast
- Sverdlovsky, Kursk Oblast, a settlement in Kommunarovsky Selsoviet of Belovsky District of Kursk Oblast
- Sverdlovsky, Orenburg Oblast, a settlement in Sverdlovsky Selsoviet of Krasnogvardeysky District of Orenburg Oblast
- Sverdlovskoye, a selo in Sverdlovsky Selsoviet of Khabarsky District of Altai Krai
- Sverdlovskaya, Tyumen Oblast, a village in Sladkovsky District of Tyumen Oblast
- Sverdlovskaya, Vologda Oblast, a village in Verkhovsky Selsoviet of Tarnogsky District of Vologda Oblast
