= Anna Larina =

Third wife of Nikolai Bukharin

Anna Larina А́нна Ла́рина
- Born: Anna Mikhailovna Larina; 27 January 1914
- Died: 24 February 1996 (aged 82); Moscow, Russia
- Resting place: Troyekurovskoye Cemetery, Moscow
- Spouse: Nikolai Bukharin

Anna Mikhailovna Larina (Russian: А́нна Миха́йловна Ла́рина; 27 January 1914 – 24 February 1996) was the third wife of the Bolshevik leader Nikolai Bukharin and spent many years trying to rehabilitate her husband after he was executed in 1938. She was the author of a memoir entitled This I Cannot Forget.

== Biography ==
Anna Larina was born in 1914. She was adopted by her uncle Mikhail (Yuri) Larin, a Soviet economist and politician, therefore she grew up among professional revolutionaries who were very high up in the Soviet Union. As a young girl, she came to know Bukharin, who was 26 years her senior, and she constantly wrote girlish love notes to him. She married Bukharin in 1934 and they had a son, Yuri, in 1936.

In 1937, when her son was less than one year old, she was separated from him for almost 20 years when the NKVD arrested her. In 1937, Bukharin was accused of spying, attempting to dismember the Soviet Union, organising kulak uprisings, plotting to murder Joseph Stalin, and attempting mysterious acts towards Vladimir Lenin in the past. Bukharin never understood why he was being slandered but was mentally and psychologically prepared for death.

Before they were separated, Bukharin instructed Anna to memorise his final testament (knowing that it would be suppressed by Stalin) in which he implored future generations of Communist leaders to exonerate him. Not daring to write it down, she later recalled, she used to lull herself to sleep in prison by repeating her husband's words silently to herself "like a prayer". It was not published in full until 1988.

Anna was first sent into exile and then arrested on 5 September 1937 in Astrakhan. "In December 1938, I was returning to an 'investigative prison' in Moscow following a year and a half of arrests and imprisonments. First came exile in Astrakhan, then arrest and imprisonment there; next, I was sent to a camp in Tomsk for family members of so-called enemies of the people; on the way, I was held in transit cells in Saratov and Sverdlovsk; after several months in Tomsk, I was arrested a second time and sent to an isolation prison in Novosibirsk; from there I was transferred to a prison near Kemerovo, where after three months I was put on the train for Moscow.”

In Larina's memoir, she wrote mostly about her first year in the Gulag, even though she was in the Gulag for a total of 20 years. One of the greatest shocks she experienced was to be confronted by one of her childhood playmates, Andrei Sverdlov, son of one of Bukharin's old comrades. She at first thought he was a fellow prisoner, but discovered that he was her interrogator. Since Anna was the wife of Bukharin, she was constantly under close surveillance and was not allowed out to perform labor. Instead, much of her time was spent dealing with the grinding boredom of doing nothing. "By this time, I was an experienced zek (prisoner), having already been detained in many prisons: Astrakhan, Saratov, Sverdlovsk, Tomsk, Novosibirsk. I had become accustomed to an isolated existence without books, paper, or pencil, unable to do anything but string together rhymes and memorize them by endless repetition, reading from memory the verses of my favorite poets."

While in the Gulag, Anna communicated with others by tapping on the walls of their cells. This way Anna found out that her husband had been killed. “'The bastards murdered Bukharin,’ I heard again, and my doubts faded away. Every single letter of his sentence, like a metal weight, banged into my brain. Although it would be best to cut off the conversation, since I still feared this might be provocation, the temptation was too great. I had a passionate desire to find out as much as I could. During the following days, I grew attached to this condemned man who knew the true story of the trials and loved Nikolai Bartunek still. In the evenings, listening to his distinct tapping on the wall, I could not reconcile the firm even tap of his hand with the death sentence. When I heard his last words I was deeply shaken."

Twenty years of her life were spent in prison, exile, and labour camps. During this time, Anna met her second husband, Fyodor Fadeyev. Her second husband was arrested several times because of Anna and died in 1959. She had two children with Fyodor: Mikhail and Nadia.

Larina was finally released from the Gulag system in 1953 after Stalin died, while sick with tuberculosis, after having spent almost twenty years of her life there. Her exile ended in 1959 and she returned to Moscow. She devoted the rest of her life to clearing her husband’s name, writing long, detailed letters to Nikita Khrushchev and his successors demanding Bukharin's reinstatement in the pantheon of revolutionary heroes. He was finally "rehabilitated" and cleared of all charges in 1988 during the Perestroika – fifty years after his death. In 1988, she gave a speech at a conference commemorating the hundredth anniversary of Bukharin's birth given by the Institute of Marxism-Leninism of the Communist Party Central Committee.

She died in Moscow and is buried in Troyekurovskoye Cemetery.

== Bibliography ==
- Larina, Anna (1991). This I Cannot Forget: The Memoirs of Nikolai Bukharin's Widow. W. W. Norton. p. 12. ISBN 0-393-03025-3.
