= Andrei Sverdlov =

Soviet police officer (1911–1969)

Andrei Yakovlevich Sverdlov (Russian: Андрей Яковлевич Свердлов; 17 April 1911 – 15 November 1969) was a Soviet police officer, notorious for his treatment of political prisoners, who was a victim of the purge during the last years of Joseph Stalin.

== Career ==
Andrei Sverdlov's father, Yakov Sverdlov was one of the main organizers of the October Revolution, and one of the most powerful politicians in Russia until his early death. He was in prison when Andrei was born. His mother, Klavdia, was also a high-ranking official, working in education, and an Old Bolshevik. From the age of four, Andrei lived with his parents in exile in Siberia. As a seven year old, he lived in the Kremlin. During the power struggle that followed the death of the Soviet leader, Vladimir Lenin, Andrei Sverdlov backed Leon Trotsky against Stalin and as a 16 year old, in 1927, and made speeches in school supporting the Left Opposition. By 1929, he had abandoned the opposition, and joined the Komsomol, the communist youth league. But in 1930, he made what he later described as "a vile statement about Comrade Stalin."

Sverdlov joined the Communist Party in 1932, and married Nina Podvoiskaya, the 16-year-old daughter of the Old Bolshevik, Nikolai Podvoisky.

In 1935, he was arrested, along with his closest friend, Vadim Obolensky, son of the eminent Bolshevik, Valerian Obolensky. When Nikolai Bukharin contacted Stalin to ask why they had been arrested, Stalin replied that they were 'freethinkers'., but he ordered Sverdlov's release, and instructed him to join the NKVD. He was arrested again in January 1938. Allegedly, this was a ruse: he remained on the NKVD payroll, and was acting as an informant, taking advantage of the trust other prisoners put in him because of who his father was. He was released in December, after Lavrentiy Beria had taken control of the NKVD.

One of the prisoners he was assigned to interrogate was a childhood acquaintance, Anna Larina, widow of Nikolai Bukharin. When she first saw him in Lubyanka prison, she thought at first that he was a fellow prisoner, until she noticed his smart appearance and "self-satisfied face". She wrote later:

It was painful to see him in this role because most of his famous father's comrades-in-arms had fallen victims to the terror by this time ... Andrei Sverdlov's new occupation could not be regarded as anything but betrayal. The eyes of Cain were looking at me.

When Hanna Hanecka, 20-year-old daughter of Lenin's old comrade Yakov Hanecki, saw Sverdlov in prison, she rushed to hug with delight and relief, thinking that their old friendship meant that he would establish her innocence, but he shoved her away and swore at her by calling her a "bitch".

He also took part in repeatedly torturing Pyotr Petrovsky, son of the Old Bolshevik Grigory Petrovsky.

By October 1951, Sverdlov had reached the rank of Colonel of the MGB (successor to the NKVD). In that month Stalin ordered the arrests of every Jewish officer in the NKVD at the rank of Colonel or above. Sverdlov was arrested, expelled from the party, and interrogated, but never charged, and was released on 18 May 1953, and had his party membership restored in December 1953.

He was later appointed a research fellow at the Institute of Marxism–Leninism, and wrote crime novels.
