= Alexander Beloborodov =

Soviet revolutionary, politician, and regicide (1891–1938)

- Александр Белобородов
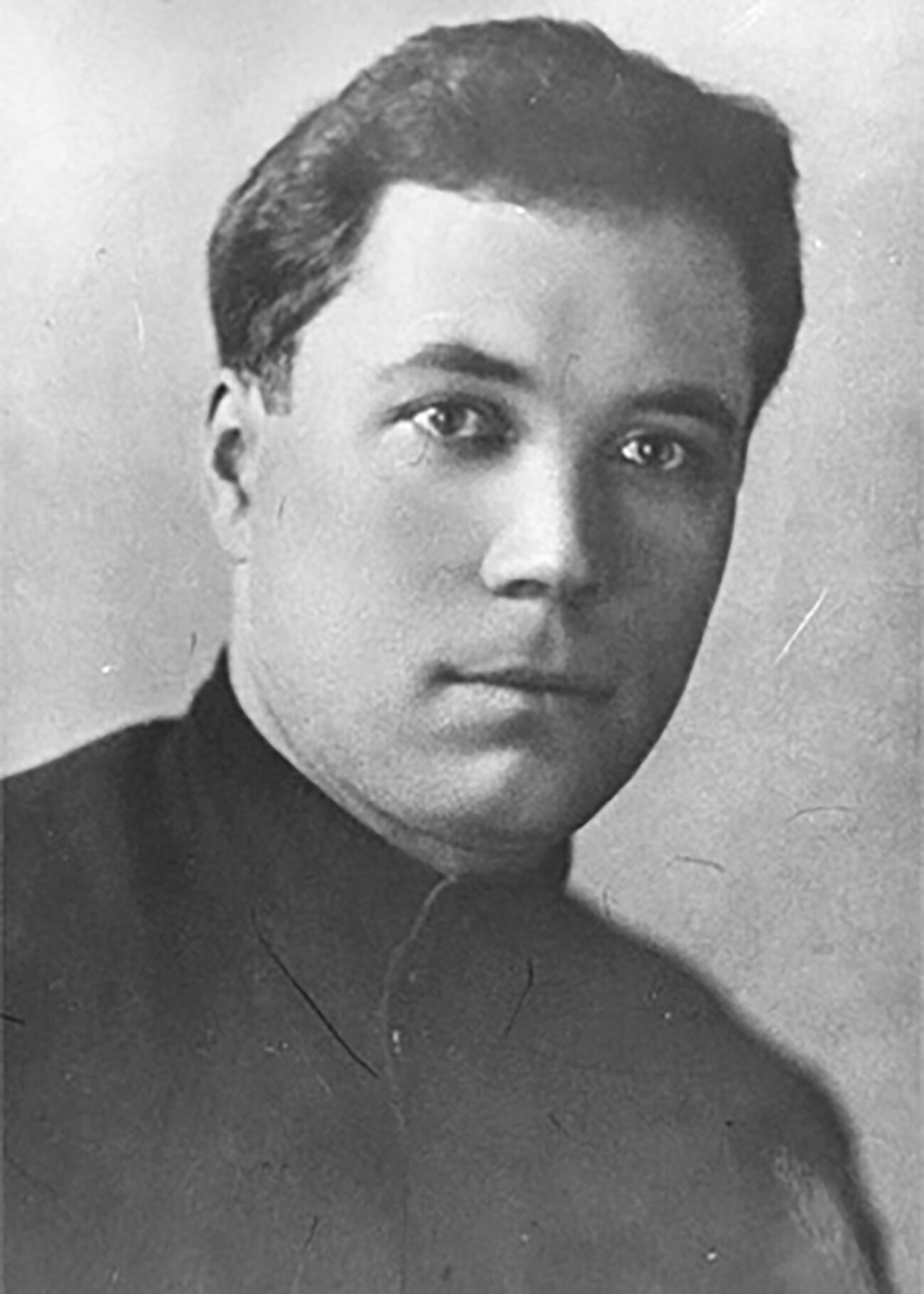
- Beloborodov in 1927

People's Commissar for Internal Affairs
- In office 30 August 1923 – 3 December 1927
- Preceded by: Felix Dzerzhinsky
- Succeeded by: Vladimir Tolmachyov

Full member of the 8th Orgburo
- In office 25 March 1919 – 11 October 1919

Candidate member of the 9th Orgburo
- In office 5 April 1920 – 16 March 1921

Personal details
- Born: 26 October 1891 Alexandrovsk, Solikamsky Uyezd, Perm Governorate, Russian Empire
- Died: 10 February 1938 (aged 46) Kommunarka, Moscow, Russian SFSR, Soviet Union
- Cause of death: Execution
- Resting place: Kommunarka Cemetery
- Party: RSDLP (Bolsheviks) (1907–1918); Russian Communist Party (1918–1936)

Alexander Georgiyevich Beloborodov (Russian: Алекса́ндр Гео́ргиевич Белоборо́дов; 26 October 1891 – 10 February 1938) was a Russian Bolshevik revolutionary, Soviet politician, party figure and statesman best known for his role as one of the chief regicides of Nicholas II and his family.

Born in Alexandrovsk, in the Solikamsky Uyezd of the Perm Governorate of the Russian Empire, he joined the Russian Social Democratic Labour Party in 1907. Siding with Vladimir Lenin's Bolsheviks, after the February Revolution, he became a member of the Ural Regional Party Committee, represented the Ural Bolsheviks at the Party Conference in April 1917, and subsequently became Chairman of the Central Executive Committee of the Ural Regional Council of Workers', Peasants', and Soldiers' Deputies, more commonly known as the Ural Soviet (Uraloblsovet). In July 1918, in coordination with Yakov Sverdlov in Moscow, Beloborodov ordered the execution of the former Tsar Nicholas II and his family, signing the decision by the Ural Soviet which was taken by Filipp Goloshchekin, after a final consultation with party leadership in Moscow, to deliver to Yakov Yurovsky with the final orders to murder the Imperial Family.

In March 1919 he was elected a full member of the Orgburo of the 8th Central Committee of the Russian Communist Party, and subsequently became a candidate member of the 9th Central Committee in April 1920. After the death of Yakov Sverdlov, he was considered a candidate for the post of Chairman of the All-Russian Central Executive Committee, the head of state of the Russian SFSR, but lost to Mikhail Kalinin. He subsequently served as the fourth People's Commissar for Internal Affairs of the Russian SFSR and the second for the Soviet Union, succeeding Felix Dzerzhinsky. A member of the Left Opposition associated with Leon Trotsky, he signed the Declaration of 46 in October 1923, making himself a lifelong enemy of future Soviet Leader Joseph Stalin. Like most Old Bolsheviks, especially those close to Trotsky, Beloborodov fell afoul of the Great Purge and was arrested in 1936. He was executed on 10 February 1938. Two decades after his death, he was posthumously rehabilitated in 1958.

== Biography ==
=== Early life ===
Born 26 October 1891 in the Solikamsk District, Perm Governorate, Russian Empire, Beloborodov's parents were Russian workers employed in the Alexandrovsk Factory in Solikamsk. He left school at 14 to work in a factory as an apprentice electrician. He joined the Bolsheviks in 1907, and created a local revolutionary organization in Solikamsk while working as an electrician in a mine. He was arrested early in 1908 and as a juvenile, aged 16, was sentenced to confinement in a young offenders' institute, and subsequently exiled to Siberia, where he spent about four years educating himself. After his release, he settled in the Urals and resumed his political activities.

=== Revolution and Civil War ===
After the February Revolution he became a member of the Lysva Soviet, and of the Local Committee of the RSDLP (Bolshevik), and in April, a member of the Ural Regional Party Committee. He represented the Ural Bolsheviks at the Party Conference in April 1917, and at the Sixth Congress of the RSDLP. In October 1917 following the October Revolution he became a member of the Perm Party Committee. In January 1918, he was appointed as Chairman of the Central Executive Committee of the Ural Regional Soviet amidst the beginning of the outbreak of the Eastern Front of the Russian Civil War.

=== Execution of the Romanovs ===
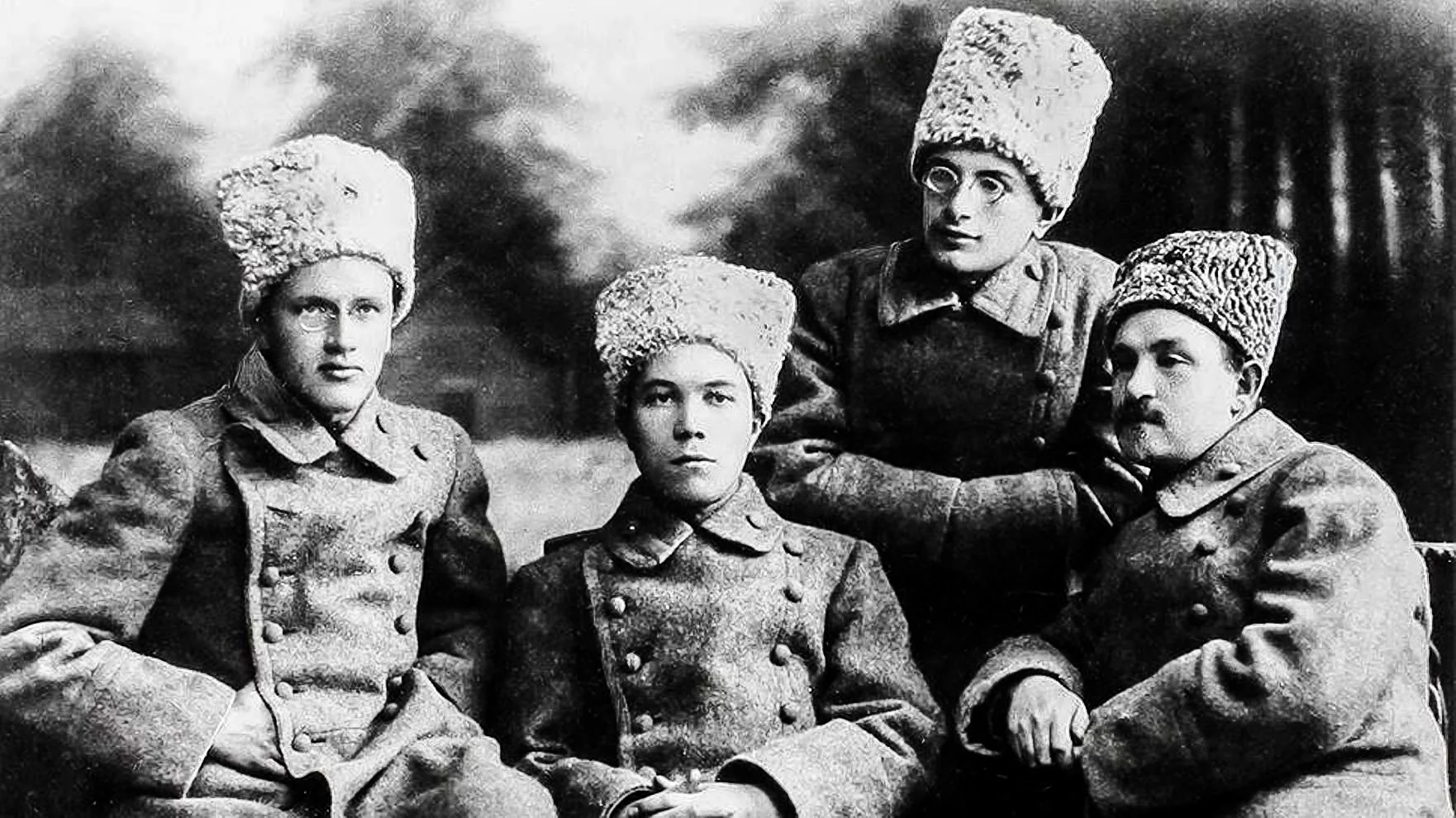
Members of the Presidium of the Ural Soviet: 1. N. G. Tolmachyov; 2. A. G. Beloborodov (Chairman); 3. G. I. Safarov; 4. F. I. Goloshchekin

In June 1918, Beloborodov approved an initiative by the regional Cheka led by Gavril Myasnikov to execute Grand Duke Michael, either in advance, or after the fact. It was under Beloborodov's administration that the former Emperor Nicholas II, his wife, their five children, and a number of their former retainers were transferred to Yekaterinburg, though it was the military commissar Filipp Goloshchyokin who was in overall charge of the family's incarceration, while Yakov Yurovsky was appointed as commandant of the Ipatiev House, and Pavel Medvedev headed the external guard.

Along with Pyotr Voykov, Beloborodov directed the smuggling of letters written in French to the imprisoned Romanovs at the Ipatiev House, claiming to be a monarchist officer seeking to rescue them, composed at the behest of the Cheka. These fabricated letters, along with the Romanov responses to them, written either on blank spaces or on the envelope, were ultimately used by the Ural Soviet, and likely the Central Executive Committee in Moscow, to justify murdering the Imperial Family amidst the rapid gains made by the White Army in the region. In June 1918, when Yekaterinburg appeared to be at risk of being captured by the Czechoslovak Legion, Beloborodov and the other members of the Ural Soviet agreed upon the execution of the prisoners. On 15 or 16 July, the Ural Soviet informed Yurovsky the executions could not be delayed any longer and needed to be carried out immediately. Beloborodov and Georgy Safarov would remain at the local Cheka headquarters at the Amerikanskaya Hotel while Goloshchyokin arrived at the Ipatiev House to personally direct the executions.

Following the killings, which took place during the early morning hours of 17 July, Beloborodov sent a coded telegram to Lenin's secretary, Nikolai Gorbunov. It was found by White investigator Nikolai Sokolov and reads:

"Inform Sverdlov the whole family have shared the same fate as the head. Officially the family will die at the evacuation."

Beloborodov and Yurovsky's deputy Nikulin later oversaw the ransacking of the Romanov quarters, seizing all the family's personal items, the most valuable piled up in Yurovsky's office, whilst things considered inconsequential and of no value, such as family photo albums, were stuffed into the stoves and burned.

The Ural Soviet subsequently ordered the summary execution of the Tsarina's sister, Princess Elisabeth of Hesse and by Rhine, and five other men from the House of Romanov in Alapayevsk on 18 July, only a day after the killing of Nicholas and his family, with Georgy Safarov being dispatched to oversee the killings in Alapayevsk. On 25 July, Yekaterinburg was taken by soldiers of Colonel Sergei Wojciechowski, and Beloborodov and most of the Ural Soviet were evacuated first to Perm, then to Vyatka.

=== Career in Moscow ===
Following the capture of Yekaterinburg, Beloborodov was appointed in January 1919 Chairman of the Vyatka Provincial Revolutionary Committee, then the Executive Committee of the Vyatka Regional Soviet. At the Eighth Congress of the Russian Communist Party in March 1919, he was elected a full member of the Orgburo of the Central Committee of the All-Russian Communist Party (Bolshevik). On 25 March 1919, he was a candidate considered for the post of Chairman of the Central Executive Committee of the All-Russian Congress of Soviets following the death of Yakov Sverdlov, but Mikhail Kalinin was ultimately elected in his place. From July 1919, he was deputy head of the Political Directorate of the Revolutionary Military Council.

=== Activities in the Caucasus ===
In April 1919 he was sent to suppress the Vyoshensky Uprising on the Don. He participated in the battles with the troops of the All-Union Federal Socialist League in the Don, Kuban and the Caucasus. From the end of 1919 for two years, his work was mainly connected with the North Caucasus. Appointed a member of the Revolutionary Military Council of the 9th Army of the South-East-Caucasus Fronts from 9 October 1919, he served in this capacity until 28 June 1920. In this position, he played a major role in the trial and subsequent execution of the commander of the Red Cavalry Corps, Boris Dumenko. After the 9th Party Congress in April 1920, he was made a candidate member of the Central Committee, a member of the Caucasian Bureau of the Central Committee, and deputy chairman of the Revolutionary Military Council of the Caucasian Army. During this period, he frequently called for the complete physical extermination of all counter-revolutionaries. He wrote in one of his letters, complaining to Nikolay Krestinsky about the leniency of the sentences being handed down by the local Don Revolutionary Tribunals:

This naivety needs to be put to an end, and the sooner the better. It is necessary to organize the Extraordinary Commission and, as soon as possible, end this tribunal torment. The most basic rule of conduct in dealing with counter-revolutionaries: those who are captured are not judged, they are liquidated. Authoritative actions for the Don are therefore necessary in this spirit. I insist on it in the most decisive way.

=== Head of the NKVD ===
On 29 November 1921, Beloborodov was appointed Deputy People's Commissar for Internal Affairs of the Russian SFSR acting under Felix Dzerzhinsky, and on 30 August 1923 was named People's Commissar of Internal Affairs (NKVD). He was subsequently named on 19 November 1923 Chairman of the Commission for the Improvement of Children's Lives.

On 15 November 1923, the Presidium of the Central Executive Committee of the USSR decided to transform the GPU under the NKVD into the Joint State Political Directorate (OGPU) under the direct control of the Council of People's Commissars of the USSR. The NKVD was therefore released from the function of ensuring state security during this period, but maintained other responsibilities.

In 1923, the working apparatus of the People's Commissariat for Internal Affairs under Beloborodov's leadership included:

- Central Administrative Department
- General Directorate of Places of Detention
- General Directorate of Communal Services
- Business Management
- Russian–Ukrainian Delegation
- Russian–Ukrainian–Polish Mixed Repatriations Commission

=== Membership of the Left Opposition ===
In October 1923, Beloborodov was one of the signatories of the Declaration of 46, which called for greater freedom of debate within the Communist Party. This evoked a sarcastic response from Stalin writing in Pravda on 15 December 1923 that "in the ranks of the opposition there are men like Beloborodov, whose 'democracy' is still remembered by the workers of Rostov". From then on Beloborodov was associated with the Left Opposition, centered around Leon Trotsky. After Trotsky was evicted from the Kremlin in 1927, he lodged in Beloborodov's rooms in the House of the Soviets in Granovsky Street, Moscow. Beloborodov was relieved of his duties and expelled from the Communist Party in December 1927 and exiled to northern Siberia, but recanted in 1929, and was readmitted to the party in 1930, and employed in the system of the Committee of State Purchases of the USSR.

=== Arrest and execution ===
Beloborodov was arrested in 1936, early in Stalin's great purge of the upper echelons of the Communist Party, but resisted making the confession required of him, so although his name was mentioned at the trial of Karl Radek and others in January 1937, he was not produced in court. In May 1937, Stalin sent a note to Nikolai Yezhov, head of the NKVD, saying: "One might think that prison for Beloborodov is a podium for reading speeches, statements which refer to the activities of all sorts of people but not to himself. Isn't it time to squeeze this gentleman and make him tell about his dirty deeds? Where is he, in prison or in a hotel?". It can be assumed that after receiving this instruction, the NKVD subjected him to brutal torture. A fellow prisoner reported hearing him being dragged along a prison corridor shouting in the summer 1937, "I am Beloborodov! Pass the word on to the Central Committee that I am being tortured!". His name was on a death list signed by Stalin, Molotov, Kaganovich, and Voroshilov on 21 October 1937 (appeared on the death lists of February, October and November 1937, it is not clear why he was shot only in February 1938, almost a year later.) He was shot on 10 February 1938 at Kommunarka firing range after being sentenced the same day.

== Legacy and rehabilitation ==
In 1958, he was posthumously rehabilitated, and in 1962 he was posthumously reinstated in the ranks of the Communist Party of the Soviet Union. Unlike many of the other Ural Bolsheviks such as Tolmachyov, Goloshchekin, and Voykov, Beloborodov did not receive any further posthumous honors.
