= Politburo and Secretariat of the 8th Congress of the Russian Communist Party (Bolsheviks) =

Supreme political authority in Soviet Union 1919–1920

The Politburo and Secretariat of the 8th Congress of the Russian Communist Party (Bolsheviks) were elected by the 1st Plenary Session of the 8th Central Committee in the immediate aftermath of the 8th Congress.

== 8th Politburo ==
8th Politburo and Secretariat

25 March 1919 – 5 April 1920

Candidate members
Name (birth–death)	Took office	Left office	Duration
Nikolai Bukharin (1888–1938)	25 March 1919	5 April 1920	1 year, 11 days
Grigory Zinoviev (1883–1936)	25 March 1919	5 April 1920	1 year, 11 days
Mikhail Kalinin (1875–1946)	25 March 1919	5 April 1920	1 year, 11 days
Elena Stasova (1873–1966)	4 July 1919	26 September 1919	84 days

Full members
Name (birth–death)	Took office	Left office	Duration
Lev Kamenev (1883–1936)	25 March 1919	5 April 1920	1 year, 11 days
Nikolay Krestinsky (1883–1938)	25 March 1919	5 April 1920	1 year, 11 days
Vladimir Lenin (1870–1924)	25 March 1919	5 April 1920	1 year, 11 days
Joseph Stalin (1878–1953)	25 March 1919	5 April 1920	1 year, 11 days
Leon Trotsky (1879–1940)	25 March 1919	5 April 1920	1 year, 11 days

== 8th Secretariat ==
Name (birth–death)	Took office	Left office	Duration	Note
Nikolay Krestinsky (1886–1937)	29 November 1919	5 April 1920	128 days	Elected Responsible Secretary, and to the Secretariat, at the 8th Plenary Session.
Elena Stasova (1873–1966)	25 March 1919	5 April 1920	1 year, 11 days	Elected Responsible Secretary at the 1st Plenary Session, and relieved of her duties at the 8th Plenary Session to become an ordinary member.
