= Vladimir Tolmachyov (politician) =

Soviet politician (1887–1937)

- Владимир Толмачёв
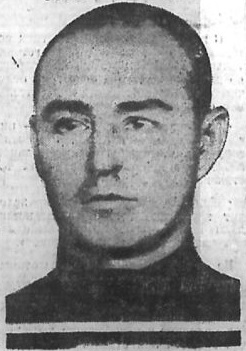
- Tolmachyov's 1937 mugshot

People's Commissar for the Interior
- In office 2 January 1928 – 10 February 1931
- Preceded by: Alexander Beloborodov
- Succeeded by: Office abolished

Personal details
- Born: October 19, 1887 Kostroma, Russian Empire
- Died: September 20, 1937 (aged 49) Moscow, Russian SFSR, Soviet Union
- Party: RSDLP (Bolsheviks) (1904–1918); Russian Communist Party (1918–1932)

Vladimir Nikolayevich Tolmachyov (Russian: Влади́мир Никола́евич Толмачёв; October 19, 1887 – September 20, 1937) was a Soviet politician.

== Biography ==
He was born on October 19, 1887, in Kostroma, in the family of a teacher. In 1904, as a gymnasium student he joined the RSDLP. A member of the Bolshevik wing since 1905, Tolmachyov was also a member of the Kostroma Committee of the RSDLP. In 1906, he was arrested for revolutionary activities, and sentenced to five years under police supervision in the Yarensky district of the Vologda province. After serving his term, he lived on the Black Sea coast of the Caucasus. In 1911, he was drafted into the Imperial Army and spent two years in military service. In 1914, with the outbreak of World War I, he was again drafted into the army and served in Novorossiysk. In March 1917 he organized and headed the Council of Soldiers' Deputies of the Novorossiysk garrison. After the October Revolution in November 1917 he was appointed head of the military department, and then the military commissar of Novorossiysk. In June 1918 he participated in the sinking of the ships of the Black Sea Fleet that refused to surrender to the Germans under the terms of the Treaty of Brest-Litovsk. From 1919 he was deputy head of the political department of the 14th Army.

From June 28, 1920, he was a Revolutionary Military Council of Crimea member. In the years 1921–1922 he was executive secretary of the Kuban-Black Sea Regional Party Committee. From 1922 to 1924 he was chairman of the executive committee of the Kuban-Black Sea Regional Council. From July 1924, he was deputy chairman of the executive committee of the North Caucasus Regional Council. He was appointed People's Commissar for Interior on January 2, 1928, succeeding Alexander Beloborodov, until the abolition of that office on February 10, 1931.

After January 1931, he became the head of the Main Road Transport Administration under the Council of People's Commissars of the Russian SFSR and a member of the economic council. On November 25, 1932, Tolmachyov, together with N. B. Eismont, was accused of participating in a "right-opportunist anti-party counter-revolutionary group". He was expelled from the CPSU and arrested. On 16 January 1933, by a decision of the Special Meeting of the OGPU of the USSR, he was sentenced under Article 58-10 of the Criminal Code of the USSR to three years in a forced labor camp. After serving his sentence, in 1935, he returned to Kostroma, where he was appointed head of the coastal development of the fuel office. On March 30, 1937, was arrested on suspicion of participating in a counter-revolutionary terrorist organization. Tried by the Military Collegium of the Supreme Court of the USSR on September 20, 1937, Tolmachyov was sentenced to death, and executed on the same day.

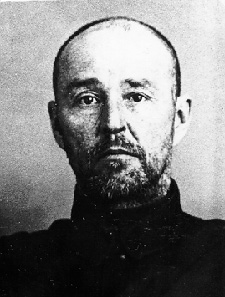

By the decision of the Military Collegium of the Supreme Court of the USSR of August 23, 1962, he was posthumously rehabilitated and reinstated in the party.
