= Varlam Avanesov =

Armenian Bolshevik revolutionary and Soviet politician

Illustration of Varlam Avanesov from the Great Soviet Encyclopedia

Varlam Aleksandrovich Avanesov (Russian: Варлаам Александрович Аванесов; born Suren Karpovich Martirosyan, Russian: Сурен Карпович Мартиросян; 5 April 1884 – March 16, 1930) was an Armenian Bolshevik revolutionary and Soviet politician.

Avanesov was born in 1884 to a peasant Armenian family in the historically Armenian Kars Oblast of the Russian Empire (in present-day Turkey).

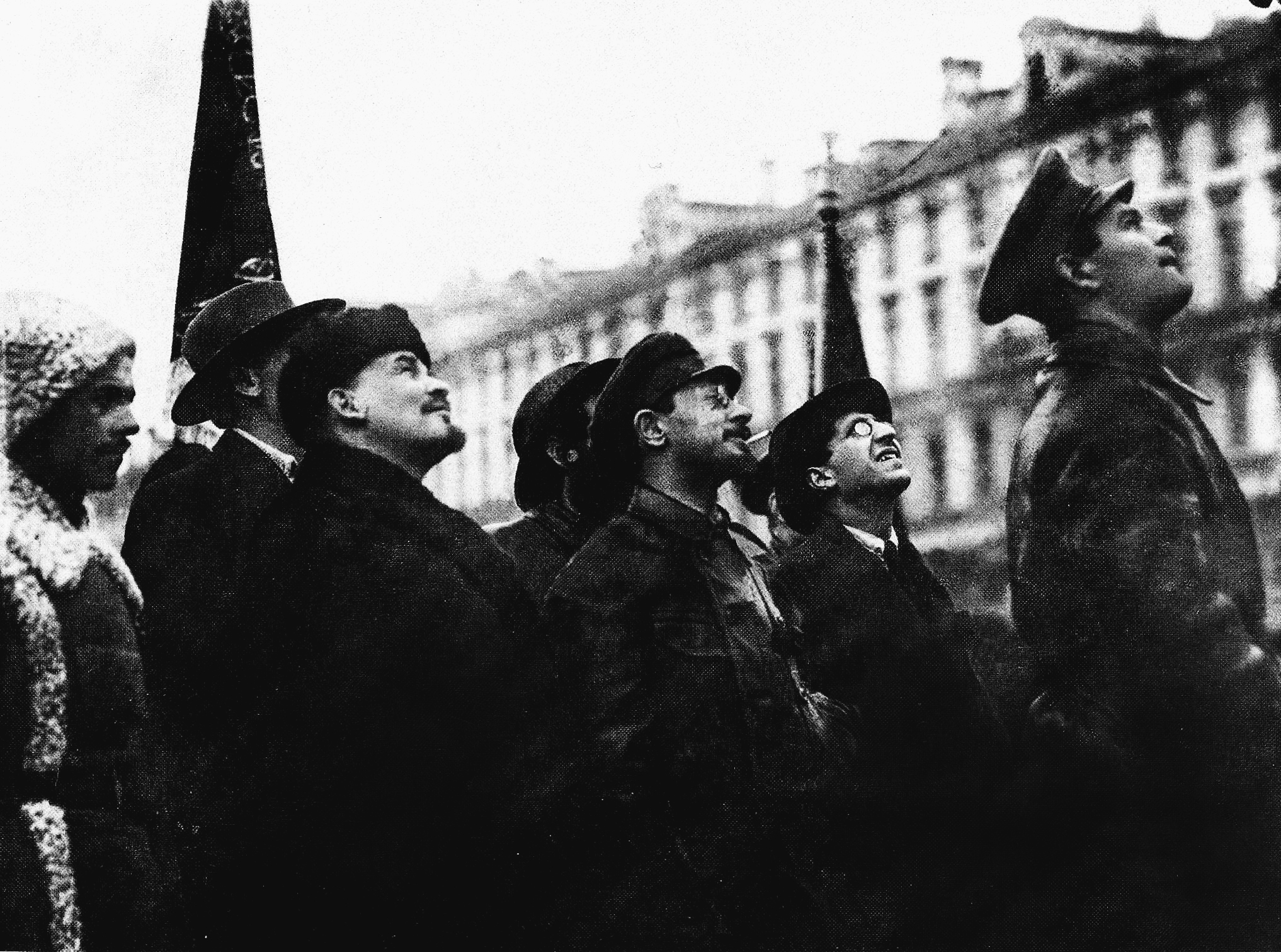
Varlam Avanesov in 1918. From left to right: Lenin, Sverdlov and Avanesov.

As a schoolboy, he joined the Dashnaks, Armenian nationalist revolutionaries, but broke with them in 1901 to join Hunchak, an Armenian Marxist party. In 1903, he joined the Russian Social Democratic Labour Party, and worked in the illegal party organisation in the North Caucasus. Initially he sided with the Mensheviks, moving to Bolshevik faction in 1914. From 1907 to 1913 he lived in Switzerland, studying at the University of Zurich. He was secretary of the RSDLP group in Davos.

In March 1917, he was a member of the Bolshevik faction on the Moscow Soviet, and later a member of the Presidium of the All-Russia Central Executive Committee of the soviets. In 1920–1924, Deputy People's Commissar of Rabkrin (the Workers' and Peasants' Inspection), and a member of the Collegium of the Cheka, and later Deputy People's Commissar for Foreign Trade.

Avanesov died on 16 March 1930. The urn of his ashes were buried at the Novodevichy Cemetery.
