= Central Committee of the 7th Congress of the Russian Communist Party (Bolsheviks) =

Central Committee of the 7th Congress

8 March 1918 – 23 March 1919
- Inner-groups: Politburo: 5 full & 2 candidates Secretariat: 2 members Orgburo: 3 members

Candidates

The Central Committee (CC) composition was elected by the 7th Congress, and sat from 8 March 1918 until 23 March 1919. The CC 1st Plenary Session renewed the composition of the Bureau, Secretariat and the Organizational Bureau (OB) of the Russian Communist Party (Bolsheviks).

== Plenary sessions ==
Plenary sessions of the Central Committee
Plenum	Date	Length
1st Plenary Session	8 March 1918	1 day
2nd Plenary Session	15 March 1918	1 day
3rd Plenary Session	30 March 1918	1 day
4th Plenary Session	31 March 1918	1 day
5th Plenary Session	31 March 1918	1 day
6th Plenary Session	4 April 1918	1 day
7th Plenary Session	7 April 1918	1 day
8th Plenary Session	26 April 1918	1 day
9th Plenary Session	3 May 1918	1 day
10th Extraordinary Plenary Session	6 May 1918	1 day
11th Plenary Session	10 May 1918	1 day
12th Plenary Session	13 May 1918	1 day
13th Plenary Session	18 May 1918	1 day
14th Plenary Session	19 May 1918	1 day
15th Plenary Session	26 June 1918	1 day
16th Plenary Session	29 July 1918	1 day
17th Plenary Session	14 September 1918	1 day
18th Plenary Session	16 September 1918	1 day
19th Plenary Session	2 October 1918	1 day
20th Plenary Session	22 October 1918	1 day
21st Plenary Session	25 October 1918	1 day
22nd Plenary Session	26 October 1918	1 day
23rd Plenary Session	25 December 1918	1 day
24th Plenary Session	30 December 1918	1 day
25th Plenary Session	16 January 1919	1 day
26th Plenary Session	4 February 1919	1 day
27th Plenary Session	14 March 1919	1 day
28th Plenary Session	16 March 1919	1 day
29th Plenary Session	17 March 1919	1 day

== Composition ==
=== Members ===
Members of the Central Committee of the 7th Congress of the Russian Communist Party (Bolsheviks)
Name	Cyrillic	6th CC	8th CC	Birth	Death	PM	Nationality	Gender	Portrait
Nikolai Bukharin	Никола́й Буха́рин	Old	Reelected	1888	1938	1906	Russian	Male	
Felix Dzerzhinsky	Фе́ликс Дзержи́нский	Old	Reelected	1877	1926	1906	Polish	Male	
Nikolay Krestinsky	Никола́й Крести́нский	Old	Reelected	1883	1938	1901	Ukrainian	Male	
Mikhail Lashevich	Александр Криницкий	New	Not	1884	1937	1901	Jewish	Male	
Vladimir Lenin	Владимир Ленин	Old	Reelected	1870	1924	1898	Russian	Male	
Vasily Schmidt	Василий Шмидт	New	Candidate	1886	1938	1905	German	Male	
Fyodor Sergeyev	Фёдор Серге́ев	Old	Candidate	1895	1921	1914	Russian	Male	
Ivar Smilga	Ивар Смилга	Old	Reelected	1892	1937	1907	Latvian	Male	
Grigori Sokolnikov	Григорий Сокольников	Old	Not	1888	1939	1905	Jewish	Male	
Joseph Stalin	Ио́сиф Ста́лин	Old	Reelected	1878	1953	1898	Georgian	Male	
Elena Stasova	Еле́на Ста́сова	Candidate	Reelected	1873	1966	1898	Russian	Female	
Yakov Sverdlov	Я́ков Свердло́в	Old	Died	1885	1919	1901	Jewish	Male	
Leon Trotsky	Лев Тро́цкий	Old	Reelected	1879	1940	1917	Jewish	Male	
Mikhail Vladimirsky	Михаи́л Влади́мирский	New	Candidate	1874	1951	1898	Russian	Male	
Grigory Zinoviev	Григо́рий Зино́вьев	Old	Reelected	1883	1936	1901	Jewish	Male	

=== Candidates ===
Candidate Members of the Central Committee of the 7th Congress of the Russian Communist Party (Bolsheviks)
Name	Cyrillic	6th CC	8th CC	Birth	Death	PM	Nationality	Gender	Portrait
Jan Berzin	Ян Берзин	Member	Not	1881	1938	1902	Latvian	Male	
Adolph Joffe	Владимир Милютин	Candidate	Not	1883	1927	1910	Karaite	Male	
Aleksei Kiselyov	Алексей Киселёв	Candidate	Not	1879	1937	1898	Russian	Male	
Georgy Oppokov	Гео́ргий Оппо́ков	Candidate	Not	1888	1938	1903	Russian	Male	
Grigory Petrovsky	Григо́рій Петро́вський	New	Not	1878	1958	1898	Ukrainian	Male	
Pyotr Stuchka	Пётр Сту́чка	New	Not	1865	1932	1906	Latvian	Male	
Moisei Uritsky	Моисей Урицкий	Member	Not	1873	1918	1917	Jewish	Male	
Alexander Shliapnikov	Алекса́ндр Шля́пников	New	Not	1885	1937	1901	Russian	Male	
