= Bureau, Secretariat and Orgburo of the 7th Congress of the Russian Communist Party (Bolsheviks) =

Supreme political authority in Soviet Union 1919

The Bureau, Secretariat and Orgburo of the 7th Congress of the Russian Communist Party (Bolsheviks) were elected by a Session of the 7th Central Committee in the immediate aftermath of the 7th Congress. The 7th Orgburo was elected by the twenty-fourth session of the 7th Central Committee, held on 16 January 1919.

== 7th Bureau ==
Name (birth–death)	Took office	Left office	Duration
Vladimir Lenin (1870–1924)	8 March 1918	25 March 1919	1 year, 17 days
Grigori Sokolnikov (1888–1939)	8 March 1918	29 July 1918	143 days
Grigori Sokolnikov (1888–1939)	11 March 1919	25 March 1919	14 days
Joseph Stalin (1878–1953)	8 March 1918	25 March 1919	1 year, 17 days
Elena Stasova (1873–1966)	11 March 1919	25 March 1919	14 days
Yakov Sverdlov (1885–1919)	8 March 1918	16 March 1919	1 year, 8 days
Leon Trotsky (1879–1940)	8 March 1918	25 March 1919	1 year, 17 days

== 7th Secretariat ==
Name (birth–death)	Took office	Left office	Duration	Note
Yakov Sverdlov (1885–1919)	8 March 1918	16 March 1919	1 year, 8 days	Elected Chairman of the Secretariat by the Central Committee.
Elena Stasova (1873–1966)	11 March 1919	25 March 1919	14 days	—

== 7th Orgburo ==
Name (birth–death)	Took office	Left office	Duration	Note
Nikolay Krestinsky (1883–1938)	16 January 1919	25 March 1919	68 days	—
Yakov Sverdlov (1885–1919)	16 January 1919	16 March 1919	59 days	Died in office.
Mikhail Vladimirsky (1885–1951)	16 January 1919	25 March 1919	68 days	—
