= Inner-composition of the 6th Congress of the Russian Social Democratic Labour Party (Bolsheviks) =

Soviet governing body membership

The inner-composition of the 6th Congress was elected by the sixth composition of the Central Committee of the Russian Social Democratic Labour Party (Bolsheviks).

== Narrow Composition ==
Name (birth–death)	Took office	Left office	Duration	PM	Ethnicity	Gender
Andrei Bubnov (1884–1938)	4 August 1917	10 October 1917	68 days	1903	Russian	Male
Felix Dzerzhinsky (1887–1926)	4 August 1917	10 October 1917	68 days	1895	Polish	Male
Adolf Joffe (1883–1927)	4 August 1917	10 October 1917	68 days	1917	Karaite	Male
Vladimir Milutin (1884–1937)	4 August 1917	10 October 1917	68 days	1910	Russian	Male
Matvei Muranov (1873–1959)	4 August 1917	10 October 1917	68 days	1903	Ukrainian	Male
Yakov Sverdlov (1885–1919)	4 August 1917	10 October 1917	68 days	1901	Jewish	Male
Grigori Sokolnikov (1888–1939)	4 August 1917	10 October 1917	68 days	1905	Jewish	Male
Joseph Stalin (1878–1953)	4 August 1917	10 October 1917	68 days	1898	Georgian	Male
Yelena Stasova (1873–1966)	4 August 1917	10 October 1917	68 days	1898	Russian	Female
Moisei Uritsky (1873–1918)	4 August 1917	10 October 1917	68 days	1917	Jewish	Male
Stepan Shahumyan (1878–1919)	4 August 1917	10 October 1917	68 days	1898	Armenian	Male

== Secretariat ==
Name (birth–death)	Took office	Left office	Duration	PM	Ethnicity	Gender
Felix Dzerzhinsky (1887–1926)	6 August 1917	8 March 1918	217 days	1895	Polish	Male
Adolf Joffe (1883–1927)	6 August 1917	8 March 1918	217 days	1917	Karaite	Male
Matvei Muranov (1873–1959)	6 August 1917	8 March 1918	217 days	1903	Ukrainian	Male
Yakov Sverdlov (1885–1919)	6 August 1917	8 March 1918	217 days	1901	Jewish	Male
Yelena Stasova (1873–1966)	6 August 1917	8 March 1918	217 days	1898	Russian	Female

== Politburo (elected on 10 October by CC) ==
Name (birth–death)	Took office	Left office	Duration	PM	Ethnicity	Gender
Andrei Bubnov (1884–1938)	10 October 1917	29 November 1917	50 days	1903	Russian	Male
Lev Kamenev (1883–1936)	10 October 1917	29 November 1917	50 days	1901	Jewish-Russian (Note: His father was Jewish and his mother Russian)	Male
Grigori Sokolnikov (1883–1936)	10 October 1917	29 November 1917	50 days	1905	Jewish	Male
Vladimir Lenin (1870–1924)	10 October 1917	29 November 1917	50 days	1898	Russian Swedish Jewish	Male
Joseph Stalin (1878–1953)	10 October 1917	29 November 1917	50 days	1898	Georgian	Male
Leon Trotsky (1879–1940)	10 October 1917	29 November 1917	50 days	1917	Jewish	Male
Grigori Zinoviev (1883–1936)	10 October 1917	29 November 1917	50 days	1901	Jewish	Male

== Bureau (elected on 29 November) ==
Name (birth–death)	Took office	Left office	Duration	PM	Ethnicity	Gender
Vladimir Lenin (1870–1924)	29 November 1917	8 March 1918	99 days	1898	Russian Swedish Jewish	Male
Joseph Stalin (1878–1953)	29 November 1917	8 March 1918	99 days	1898	Georgian	Male
Yakov Sverdlov (1885–1919)	29 November 1917	8 March 1918	99 days	1901	Jewish	Male
Leon Trotsky (1879–1940)	29 November 1917	8 March 1918	99 days	1917	Jewish	Male

== General ==
- Staff writer. "Съезды, конференции, пленумы и заседания РСДРП – РСДРП(б) – РКП(б) – ВКП(б) – КПСС" [Congresses, conferences, plenary meetings and meetings of the RSDLP – RSDLP (b) – RCP (b) – AUCP (b) – CPSU] (in Russian). knowbysight.info.
- Staff writer (19 June 2008). "ЕВРЕИ И ВЛАСТЬ В РОССИИ (1917-1924 гг.)" [Jews and Power in Russia (1917–1924 biennum)] (in Russian). LDN - приватное собрание книг.
- Staff writer. "Узкий состав ЦК РСДРП(б) – Политическое бюро ЦК РСДРП(б)—Бюро ЦК РСДРП(б) – РКП(б)—Политическое бюро ЦК РКП(б) – ВКП(б)—Президиум – Политическое бюро ЦК КПСС" [The narrow composition of the RSDLP (b)—Political Bureau of the Central Committee of the RSDLP (B)—The Bureau of the Central Committee of the RSDLP (b) – RCP (B)—Political Bureau of the Central Committee of the RCP (b) – AUCP (b)—the Presidium – Political Bureau of the Central Committee of the CPSU] (in Russian). Archived from the original on 3 September 2019.
- Staff writer. "Секретариат ЦК РСДРП - РКП(б) - ВКП(б) - КПСС" [Secretariat of the Central Committee of the RSDLP (b) – RCP (b) – AUCP (b) – CPSU] (in Russian). Archived from the original on 25 May 2019.
- Staff writer. "Организационное бюро РКП(б) - ВКП(б)" [Organizational Bureau of the RCP (b) – AUCP (b)] (in Russian). Archived from the original on 27 October 2016.
