= Sverdlovsk blue-gray mottle-headed pigeon =

Breed of pigeon

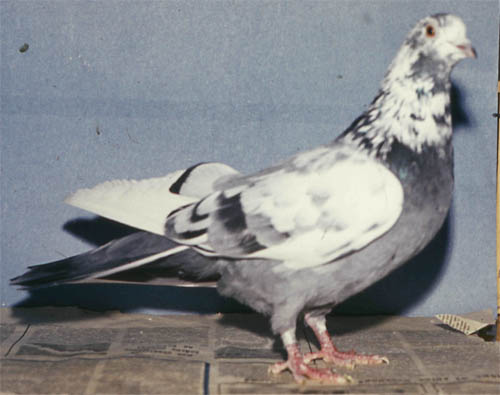
The Sverdlovsk blue-gray mottle-headed pigeons

The blue-gray mottle-headed pigeon is a breed of domestic pigeon, blue-gray to blue in color with a patterned white head, found principally in the Ural region of Russia.

== Origin ==
This breed originates from solid blue-gray and blue-craw pigeons.

== External Characteristics ==
The pigeon is middle sized. The body is solid with well-developed pectoral muscles. The wings are strong and lie on the tail. The neck is short. The back is wide and is inclined towards the tail. Set low on the legs.

- Head: middle-sized, oval, the forehead is wide and slightly prominent. The sinciput has a weak plane inclined towards the occiput. The occiput is short and smoothly blends into the neck.
- Eyes: light-colored, with redness in the iris.
- Bill: middle-sized (12–15 mm), light-gray, tightly closed. The maxilla slightly hangs over the mandible.
- Cere: small, prolate, smooth, tightly pressed against the bill.
- Eyelid: narrow, thin, light-colored.
- Neck: short, strong, without flexure.
- Chest: wide, strong, well developed, slightly prominent.
- Back: wide, straight.
- Body: solid, stream-lined.
- Wings: tight against the body. The ends of the wings are on the tail, do not cross one another, and are 1–2 cm shorter than the tail.
- Tail: tightly closed, 2 feathers wide. The tail has 12 feathers 30–40 mm wide each. The tail and the back form a straight line.
- Legs and feet: middle-sized, crimson-colored, 2.5-3.5 cm from the metatarsus to the heel, gray claws.
- Feather decorations: No.
- Feather quality: The plumage is tight. The fan is wide.

=== Color and hue ===
Blue-gray - blue

=== Pattern ===
The head is white down to the middle of the neck and has color marks. Otherwise the pigeon is blue-gray. The wing flaps have two dark stripes. The tail is blue-gray with a dark stripe at the edge.

== Flying quality ==
The pigeons are capable of flying for 3–6 hours at a high altitude. Keep separately in the air. May fly in a flock. The pigeon opens its tail when flying. The flight is smooth.

== Defects ==
=== Permissible defects ===
Narrow or slightly faceted head. Red eyelid. Yellow (straw-colored) eye. Hazel hue in the stripes and flight feathers. Drooping wings. Weak feathering of the inside part of the tegs. Dark or speckled blue-gray coloring. The neck is solid blue-gray. The number of tail feathers is up to 14.

=== Impermissible defects ===
Red (savage) eye. Different eyes. Weak speckling of the head (less than 50% white-colored feathers). White-colored feathers in parts of the body other than the head. Feathering of the legs. Somersaulting in the air.

== See also ==
- List of pigeon breeds
