= Sverdlov (disambiguation) =

Sverdlov may refer to Yakov Sverdlov, who was a Bolshevik party administrator.

Sverdlov may also refer to:

- Sverdlov-class cruiser, a Soviet cruiser class
- Sverdlov, Armenia, a village in the Lori Province of Armenia
- Sverdlov District, Bishkek, a district of Bishkek, Kyrgyzstan

== See also ==
- Sverdlovsk (disambiguation), places named for Bolshevik leader Yakov Sverdlov
- Sverdlovsky (disambiguation), places named for Yakov Sverdlov
