= Sverdlovskaya, Vologda Oblast =

Sverdlovskaya Свердловская
- Village
- Location within Vologda Oblast Location within Russia
- Coordinates: 60°28′N 43°02′E
- Country: Russia
- Region: Vologda Oblast
- District: Tarnogsky District
- Time zone: UTC+3:00

Sverdlovskaya (Russian: Свердловская) is a rural locality (a village) in Verkhovskoye Rural Settlement, Tarnogsky District, Vologda Oblast, Russia. The population was 16 as of 2002.

== Geography ==
Sverdlovskaya is located 34 km west of Tarnogsky Gorodok (the district's administrative centre) by road. Kaplinskaya is the nearest rural locality.
