= Sverdlovsky, Moscow Oblast =

Sverdlovsky Свердловский
- Urban-type settlement
- Interactive map of Sverdlovsky
- Location of Sverdlovsky Sverdlovsky (Moscow Oblast)
- Coordinates: 55.9020°N 38.1477°E
- Country: Russia
- Federal subject: Moscow Oblast

Population (2010 Census)
  - Total: 6,763
  - Estimate (2025): 27,482 (+306.4%)
- Time zone: UTC+3 (MSK)
- Postal code: 141140
- OKTMO ID: 46659158051

Sverdlovsky (Russian: Свердловский) is an urban locality (an urban-type settlement) in Moscow Oblast, Russia. Population: 6,763 (2010 census); 5,683 (2002 census); 6,127 (1989 Soviet census).

In 2018, the former Sverdlovsky urban settlement (a separate municipal formation) was merged with the neighboring Aniskinskoye rural settlement into the Losino-Petrovsky urban okrug, per Moscow Oblast law No. 69/2018-ОЗ, which took effect on 5 June 2018. This reorganization accounts for the large increase in population recorded for the locality since the 2010 census.
