= Sverdlovsk =

Sverdlovsk may refer to:

- Sverdlovsk, the name of Yekaterinburg, Russia from 1924 to 1991
- Sverdlovsk, Ukraine
- Sverdlovsk Raion, raion in Ukraine
- Sverdlovsk Oblast, a federal subject of Russia

== See also ==
- Sverdlovsk anthrax leak
- Sverdlovsk Blue-gray Mottle-headed pigeon
- Sverdlov (disambiguation)
- Sverdlovsky (disambiguation)
