= Grigory Yevdokimov =

Soviet politician (1884–1936)

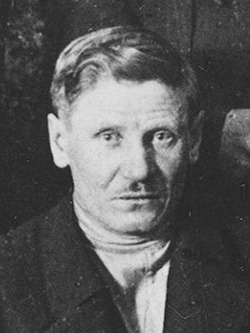
Yevdokimov in 1919

Grigori Ermeevich Yevdokimov (Russian: Григорий Еремеевич Евдокимов; October 1884 – 25 August 1936) was a Russian Bolshevik revolutionary and Soviet politician.

== Early career and Revolution ==
Yevdokimov was born in Pavlodar, in what was then the Semipalatinsk province, in modern day Kazakhstan. His father is described as a Russian tradesman. At 15, he began work as a sailor on a river vessel. He joined the Bolshevik faction of the Russian Social Democratic Labour Party since 1903. and carried out propaganda in Pavlodar and Omsk. Arrested and exiled in 1911, he fled to St Petersburg in 1913, to escape the police. Arrested again, he was exiled to Irkutsk, in Siberia, but escaped in 1916. the After the February Revolution, he was elected a member of the Russian Constituent Assembly. He was one of the organisers of the Red Guards in Petrograd (St Petersburg) during the Russian Revolution. During the Russian Civil War, he was chief political commissar and member of the Revolutionary Military Council of the 7th Army of the Western Front. According to Victor Serge, who was in Petrograd while it was in 'mortal peril' from the White Army of General Yudenich:

The city was saved mainly through Grigori Yevdokimov, an old seafarer, vigorous and grey-haired, with a mujik's roughness. Loud of voice, fond of the bottle, he never seemed to admit that a situation was hopeless.

In 1920–23, Yevdokimov was chairman of the Petrograd Council of Trade Unions. In 1923, he was again elected to the Central Committee, and appointed Deputy Chairman of the Petrograd Soviet.

== The Opposition ==
During the power struggle that followed the death of Vladimir Lenin in 1924, Yevdokimov backed Grigory Zinoviev against Leon Trotsky, and then against Joseph Stalin. In January 1925, he backed a resolution proposed by another Zinoviev supporter, Pyotr Zalutsky to expel Trotsky from the communist party, and when this was blocked by Stalin and others, he complained that they were "too soft".

On 1 January 1926, Yevdokimov was appointed a Secretary of the Central Committee – one of a team of four working with Stalin, the General Secretary – and a member of the Organizing Bureau. This appointment came at the end of the 14th party Congress, during which there had been an open split between Stalin and Zinoviev, with the Leningrad (St Petersburg) delegation unanimously backing Zinoviev. When the Central Committee next met, on 31 March, Yevdokimov submitted a long written complaint about what he called "the massacre of the Leningrad organisation" conducted after the congress, in which he alleged that more than 200 party members had been exiled from the city to remote parts of Northwestern Russia, and more than 1,500 others – including Zinoviev – had been sacked from their posts.

After the unification of the supporters of Leon Trotsky and Grigory Zinoviev, which took place in the spring of 1926, Yevdokimov became an active participant in the "United Opposition." He was removed from his positions as a party secretary and member of the Orgburo on 9 April 1926. On 14 November 1927 he was expelled from the Central Committee, along with all the others of that body who were backing the opposition, while Trotsky and Zinoviev were expelled from the party, and he was one of 75 members of the Left Opposition expelled from the party during the 15th Party Congress in December 1927.

In 1928, Yevdokimov joined Zinoviev and his other former supporters in renouncing the opposition and appealing for reinstatement. He was readmitted to the party and given a minor post managing the dairy industry.

== Arrest and execution ==
Police raided Yevdokimov's apartment on 8 December 1934, eight days after the assassination of Sergei Kirov, and found numerous documents and leaflets dating from his time as an active oppositionist. He claimed that they belonged to his son-in-law. He was arrested that same day, and was expelled from the communist party a week later. On 15–16 January, he was one of 19 defendants put on trial in Leningrad, accused of running a conspiratorial 'Moscow Centre'. During this trial, he emphatically denied any involvement in Kirov's assassination. He was sentenced to eight years in prison.

In August 1936, Yevdokimov was a defendant at the first of three main Moscow show trials. He was listed as the third most important defendant, behind Zinoviev and Lev Kamenev. He now 'confessed' to being a member of the 'Trotskyite–Zinovievite Terrorist Centre', and of having been directly involved in planning the Kirov murder. He was sentenced to death on 24 August 1936, and was shot the next day.

On 13 July 1988 he was rehabilitated by the Plenum of the Supreme Court of the USSR. It was announced in Pravda on 5 August 1988 that the Politburo commission delegated to re-examine the repression of the Stalin years had been through the evidence at both the trials in which Yevdokimov was a defendant and had found no evidence of criminal activity by the defendants. On 5 November 1988, by the decision of the CPC under the Central Committee of the CPSU, he was reinstated in the party.
