= Yakov Sverdlov =

Soviet politician (1885–1919)

- Яков Свердлов
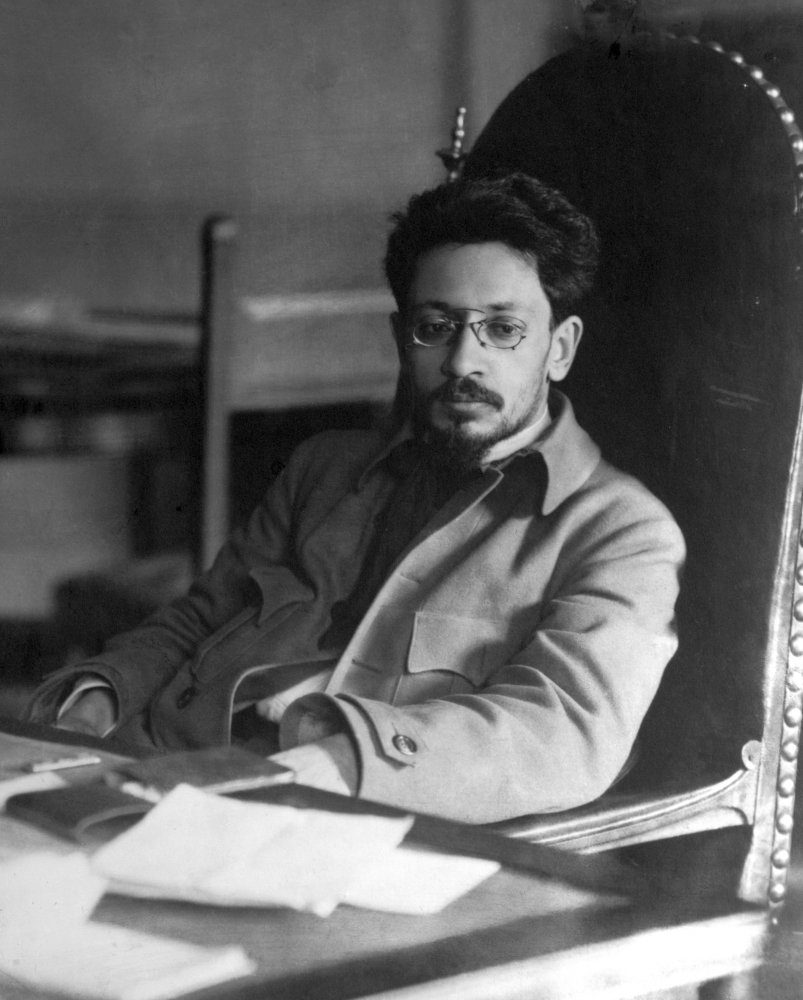
- Sverdlov in 1918

Chairman of the Central Executive Committee of the All-Russian Congress of Soviets
- In office 21 November 1917 – 16 March 1919
- Premier: Vladimir Lenin
- Preceded by: Lev Kamenev
- Succeeded by: Mikhail Vladimirsky (acting)

Chairman of the Secretariat of the Russian Communist Party (Bolsheviks)
- In office 8 March 1918 – 16 March 1919
- Preceded by: Office established
- Succeeded by: Elena Stasova (as Responsible Secretary)

Personal details
- Born: Yakov-Aaron Mikhailovich Sverdlov; 3 June 1885 Nizhny Novgorod, Russia
- Died: 16 March 1919 (aged 33) Moscow, Russia
- Resting place: Kremlin Wall Necropolis
- Party: RCP(b) (1912–1919)
- Other political affiliations: RSDLP (1902–1912)
- Spouse: Klavdia Novgorodtseva (m. 1910)
- Children: 2, including Andrei
- Relatives: Zinovy Peshkov (brother); Venyamin Sverdlov (brother); Leopold Averbakh (nephew); Ida Averbakh (niece)
- Central institution membership: 1919: Member, 7th Orgburo of RCP(b); 1917–1919: Member, 6th–7th Politburo of RCP(b); 1917–1919: Member, 6th–7th Secretariat of RCP(b); 1912–1919: Full member, 6th–7th Central Committee of RCP(b); Other offices held: 1917–1918: Member of the Russian Constituent Assembly for Simbirsk

Yakov Mikhailovich Sverdlov (Note: In this name that follows East Slavic naming customs, the patronymic is Mikhailovich and the family name is Sverdlov.) (Note: Russian: Яков Михайлович Свердлов, romanized: Yakov Mikhaylovich Sverdlov) (3 June [O.S. 22 May] 1885 – 16 March 1919) was a Russian revolutionary and Soviet politician. A key Bolshevik organizer of the October Revolution of 1917, Sverdlov served as chairman of the Secretariat of the Russian Communist Party from 1918 until his death in 1919, and as chairman of the All-Russian Central Executive Committee (head of state) from 1917 until his death in 1919.

Born in Nizhny Novgorod to a Jewish family active in revolutionary politics, Sverdlov joined the Russian Social Democratic Labour Party in 1902 and supported Vladimir Lenin's Bolshevik faction from 1903. He was active in the Urals during the failed Revolution of 1905, and over the next decade was subjected to constant imprisonment and exile.

After the 1917 February Revolution overthrew the monarchy, Sverdlov returned to Petrograd and was appointed a secretary of the party's central committee. In this capacity, he played a key role in planning the October Revolution, in which the Bolsheviks came to power. Sverdlov became one of the most powerful figures in the Soviet regime, with Lenin, Leon Trotsky, and Joseph Stalin.

In November 1917, Sverdlov was elected chairman of the All-Russian Central Executive Committee, the de facto head of state. He worked to consolidate Bolshevik control of the new regime and supported the Red Terror campaign and decossackization policies. He played major roles in the dissolution of the Constituent Assembly in January 1918, in persuading party members to support the Treaty of Brest-Litovsk signed with the Central Powers that March, and in authorising the execution of the Romanov family that July. He also served briefly as acting head of government after Lenin was injured in an assassination attempt in August.

In March 1919, Sverdlov died at age 33 of the Spanish flu, and was buried in the Kremlin Wall Necropolis. The city of Yekaterinburg (Sverdlovsk) and Theatre Square in Moscow were renamed in his honour. Some historians regard his untimely death as a key factor which enabled the rise of Stalin after Lenin's death in 1924, as Sverdlov was a natural candidate for the post of General Secretary held by Stalin from 1922.

== Early life ==
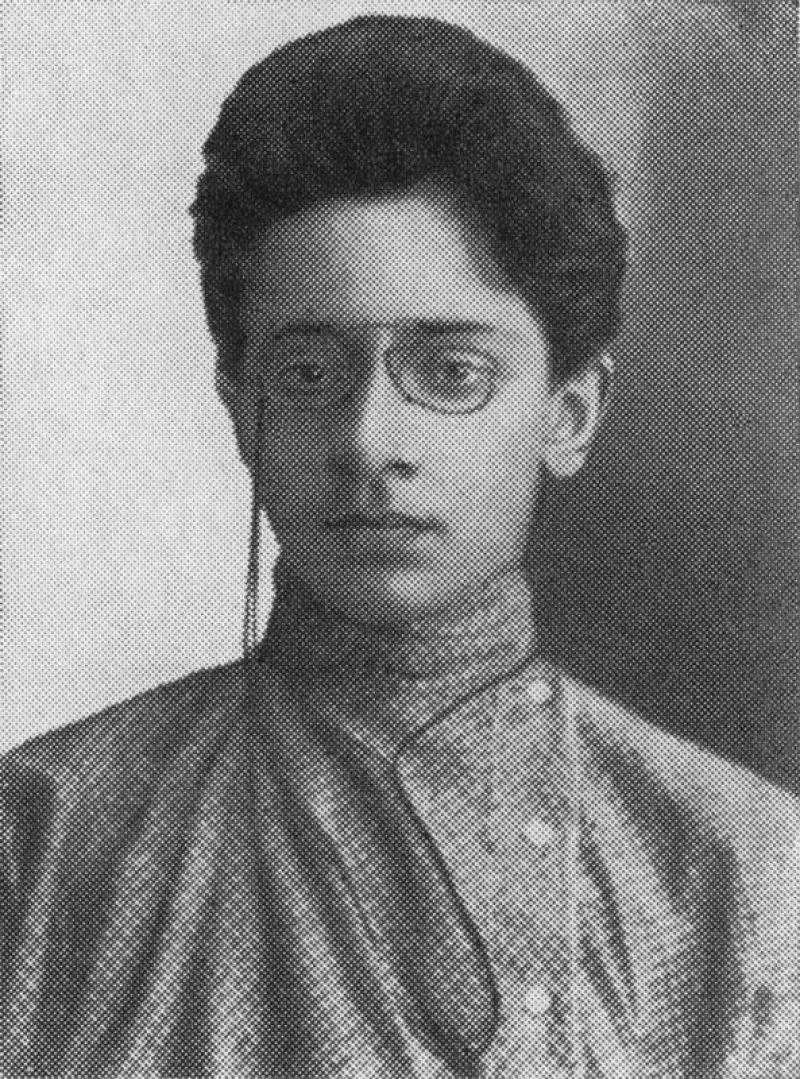
Sverdlov in 1904

Sverdlov was born in Nizhny Novgorod as Yakov-Aaron Mikhailovich Sverdlov to Jewish parents, Mikhail Izrailevich Sverdlov and Elizaveta Solomonova. His father was a politically active engraver who produced forged documents and stored arms for the revolutionary underground. The Sverdlov family had six children: two daughters (Sophia and Sara) and four sons (Zinovy, Yakov, Veniamin, and Lev). After his wife's death in 1900, Mikhail converted with his family to the Russian Orthodox Church, married Maria Aleksandrovna Kormiltseva, and had two more sons, Herman and Alexander. Sverdlov's father was sympathetic to his children's socialist tendencies and 5 out of his 6 children would become involved in revolutionary politics at some point. Mikhail watched as his household slowly became a revolutionary hotspot, where the Novgorod Social Democrats would meet, write pamphlets, and even forge stamps for false passports. Yakov's eldest brother Zinovy was adopted by Maxim Gorky, who was a frequent guest at the house. Zinovy was the only Sverdlov to reject revolutionary politics and had little to no contact with Yakov after the revolution.

Yakov excelled at school, and after 4 years in gymnasium left to become a pharmacist's apprentice and a "professional revolutionary," Sverdlov joined while a teenager the Russian Social Democratic Labour Party in 1902, and then later the Bolshevik faction, supporting Vladimir Lenin. In his youth, Sverdlov became friends with a fellow revolutionary Vladimir Lubotsky (later known as Zagorsky). He was involved in the 1905 revolution while living in the Ural Mountains. Though having never actually attended college, Sverdlov adopted the garb of the radical students at the time – "With his medium height, unruly brown hair, glasses continually perched on his nose, and Tolstoy shirt worn under his jacket, Sverdlov looked like a student, and for us...a student meant a revolutionary."

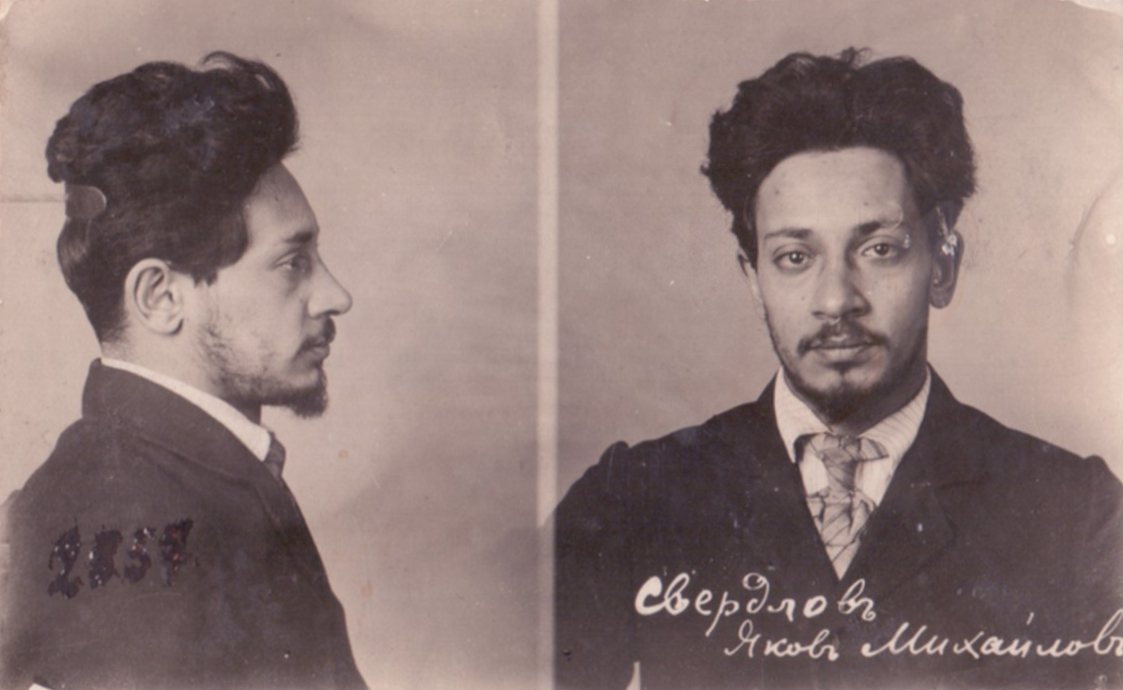
Sverdlov's Okhrana mugshot, 1910

Sverdlov became a major activist and speaker in Nizhny Novgorod. In 1906, Sverdlov was arrested and held in the Yekaterinburg prison until his release. During his time in prison, Sverdlov continued to educate himself and others, reading Lenin, Marx, Kautsky, Heine, and more. Sverdlov attempted to live by the motto: "I put books to the test of life, and life to the test of books." For most of the time from his arrest in June 1906 until 1917 he was either imprisoned or exiled. In March 1911, Sverdlov was held in the Saint Petersburg House of Pretrial Detention.

During the period 1914–1916 he was in internal exile in Turukhansk, Siberia, along with Joseph Stalin (then known as Dzhugashvili). Both had been betrayed by the Okhrana agent Roman Malinovsky. Of Stalin, Sverdlov wrote "The comrade I was with turned out to be such a person, socially, that we didn't talk or see each other. It was terrible." Sverdlov, like Stalin, was co-opted in absentia to the 1912 Prague Conference. In 1914, Sverdlov moved to a different village, moving in with his friend Filipp Goloshchyokin, known as Georges. In early 1917, Sverdlov received news of the Putilov strike of 1917 in Petrograd. Alongside Goloshchyokin, he set out at once, arriving in Petrograd on 29 March 1917.

== Party leader ==
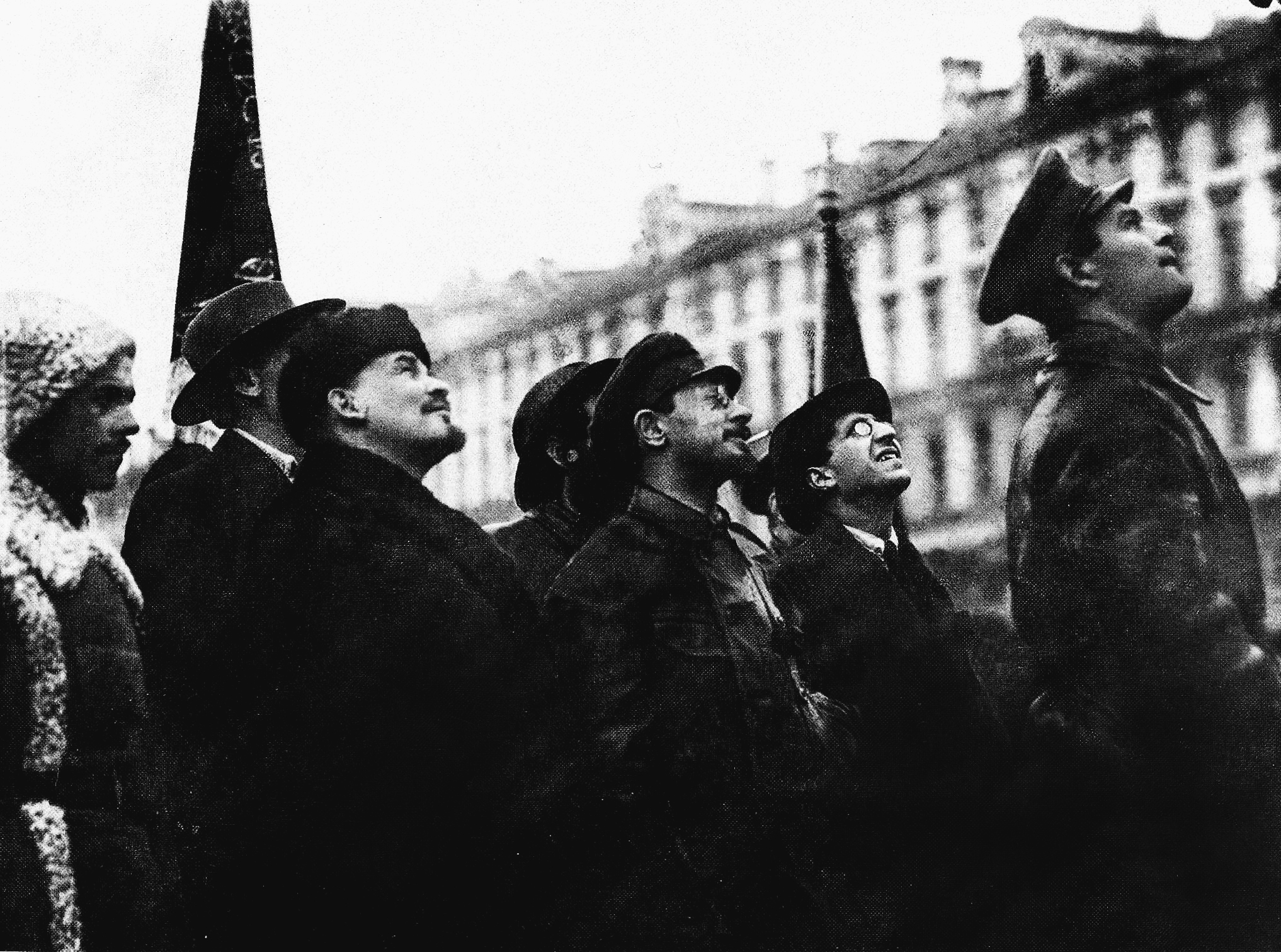
Sverdlov and Vladimir Lenin open the monument to Karl Marx in 1918

After the 1917 February Revolution Sverdlov returned to Petrograd from exile as head of the Urals Delegation and found his way into Lenin's inner circle. He first met Lenin in April 1917, and was elected as one of five members of the Central Committee's Secretariat in August 1917, after which he usurped Elena Stasova as the body's leading figure. In March 1918, he was elected Chairman of the Secretariat. According to Nikolai Podvoisky, the chairman of the Military Revolutionary Committee, "The person who did more than anyone to help Lenin with the practicalities of translating convictions into votes was Sverdlov." As chairman of the Central Committee, Yakov played an important role in planning the October Revolution and helped make the decision to stage an armed uprising. In November as the Bolsheviks debated whether to postpone or hold elections, Sverdlov advocated for immediate elections as promised. When the results came back showing that the Socialist Revolutionaries had won, Sverdlov, Lenin, and Nikolai Bukharin dissolved the assembly, leading to a civil war.

Sverdlov is sometimes regarded as the first head of state of the Soviet Union, although it was not established until 1922, three years after his death. Sverdlov had a prodigious memory and was able to retain the names and details of fellow revolutionaries in exile. He promoted his friend and suite-mate Varlam Avanesov to second-in-command at the Central Executive Committee, and would later become a top official of the secret police. He also installed Vladimir Volodarsky as commissar of print, propaganda, and agitation until his assassination in 1918. His organizational capability was well-regarded, and during his chairmanship, thousands of local party committees were initiated. One of his comrades recalled that,

[He] could tell you everything you needed to know about a comrade: where he was working, what kind of person he was, what he was good at, and what job he should be assigned to in the interests of the cause and for his benefit. Moreover, Sverdlov had a very precise impression of all the comrades: they were so firmly stamped in his memory that he could tell you all about the company each one kept. It is hard to believe, but true.

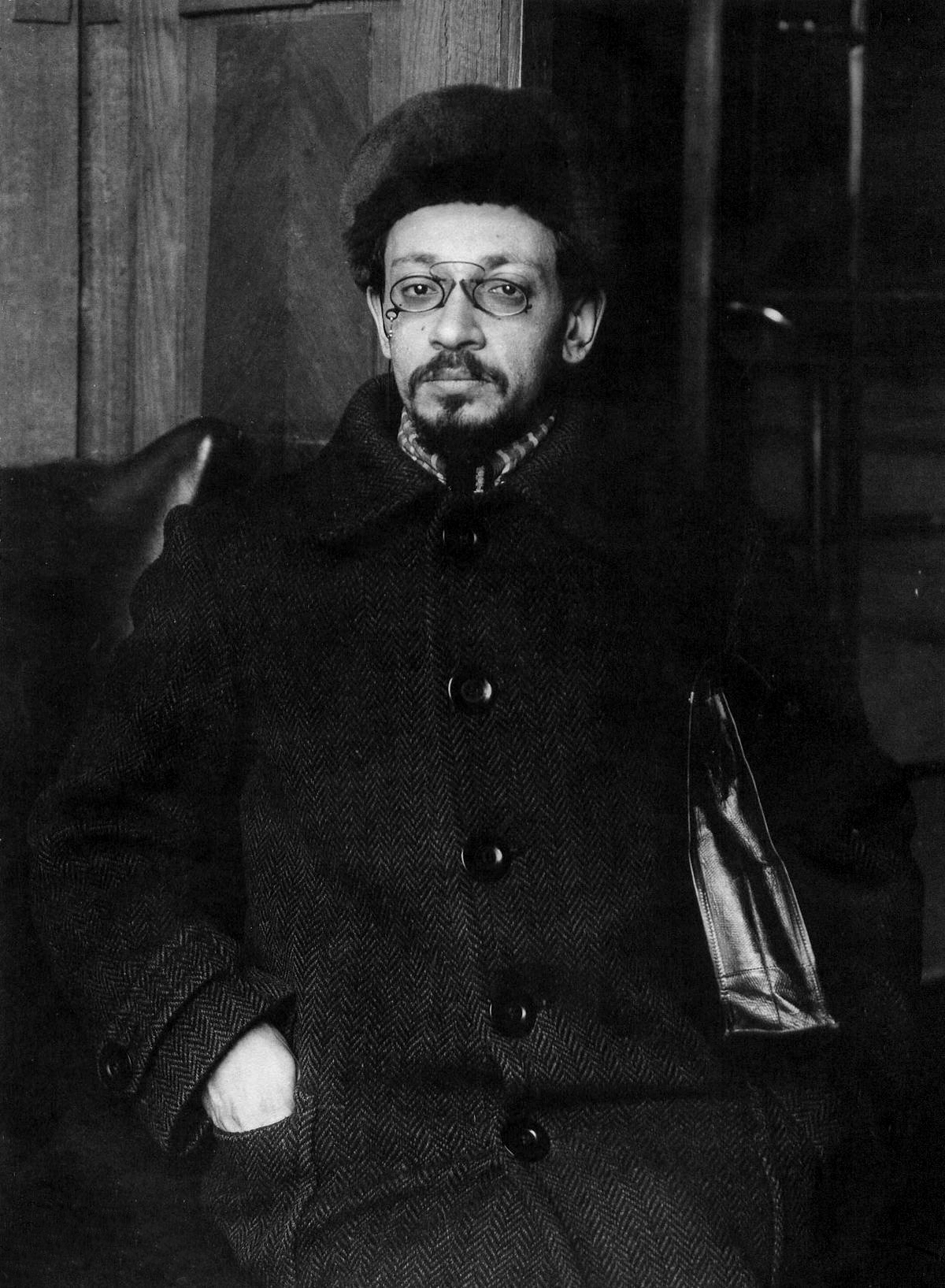
Sverdlov in 1918

Sverdlov was elected chairman of the All-Russian Central Executive Committee in November 1917, of which his wife was also a part, becoming therefore de jure head of state of the Russian SFSR until his death. He played important roles in the decision in January 1918 to end the Russian Constituent Assembly and the subsequent signing on 3 March of the Treaty of Brest-Litovsk. In March 1918 Sverdlov along with most prominent Bolsheviks fled Petrograd and moved the government headquarters to Moscow – the Sverdlovs moved into a room in the Kremlin.

In March 1918, Sverdlov and the Central Executive Committee discussed how to best remove the "ulcers that socialism has inherited from capitalism" and Yakov advocated for a concentrated effort to turn the poorest peasants in the villages against their kulak brethren. Alongside Bukharin, the party began a campaign of "concentrated violence" (including arrests, killings, censorship, forced labor, suppression of strikes and confiscation of property) against many members of the landowning, capitalist, and tradesman classes of Russian society.

=== Romanov family ===
A number of sources claim that Sverdlov, alongside Lenin and Goloshchyokin, played a major role in the execution of Tsar Nicholas II and his family on 17 July 1918.

A book written in 1990 by the Moscow playwright and historian Edvard Radzinsky claims that Sverdlov ordered their execution on 16 July 1918. This book and other Radzinsky books were characterized as "folk history" by journalists and academic historians. However, Yuri Slezkine in his book The Jewish Century expressed a slightly different opinion: "Early in the Civil War, in June 1918, Lenin ordered the killing of Nicholas II and his family. Among the men entrusted with carrying out the orders were Sverdlov, Goloshchyokin and Yakov Yurovsky".

The 1922 book by a White Army general, Mikhail Diterikhs, The Murder of the Tsar's Family and members of the House of Romanov in the Urals, sought to portray the murder of the royal family as a Jewish plot against Russia. It referred to Sverdlov by his Jewish nickname "Yankel" and to Goloshchekin as "Isaac". This book in turn was based on an account by one Nikolai Sokolov, special investigator for the Omsk regional court, whom Diterikhs assigned with the task of investigating the disappearance of the Romanovs while serving as regional governor under the White regime during the Russian Civil War. The investigating magistrate in Ekaterinburg in 1918 saw the signed telegraphic instructions to execute the Imperial Family came from Sverdlov. These details were published in 1966.

According to Leon Trotsky's diaries, after returning from the front (of the Russian Civil War) he had the following dialogue with Sverdlov:

My next visit to Moscow took place after the [temporary] fall of Ekaterinburg [to anti-Communist forces]. Speaking with Sverdlov, I asked in passing: "Oh yes, and where is the Tsar?"

"Finished," he replied. "He has been shot."

"And where is the family?"

"The family along with him."

"All of them?," I asked, apparently with a trace of surprise.

"All of them," replied Sverdlov. "What about it?" He was waiting to see my reaction. I made no reply.

"And who made the decision?," I asked.

"We decided it here. Ilyich [Lenin] believed that we shouldn't leave the Whites a live banner to rally around, especially under the present difficult circumstances."

I asked no further questions and considered the matter closed.

=== Red Terror and decossackization ===
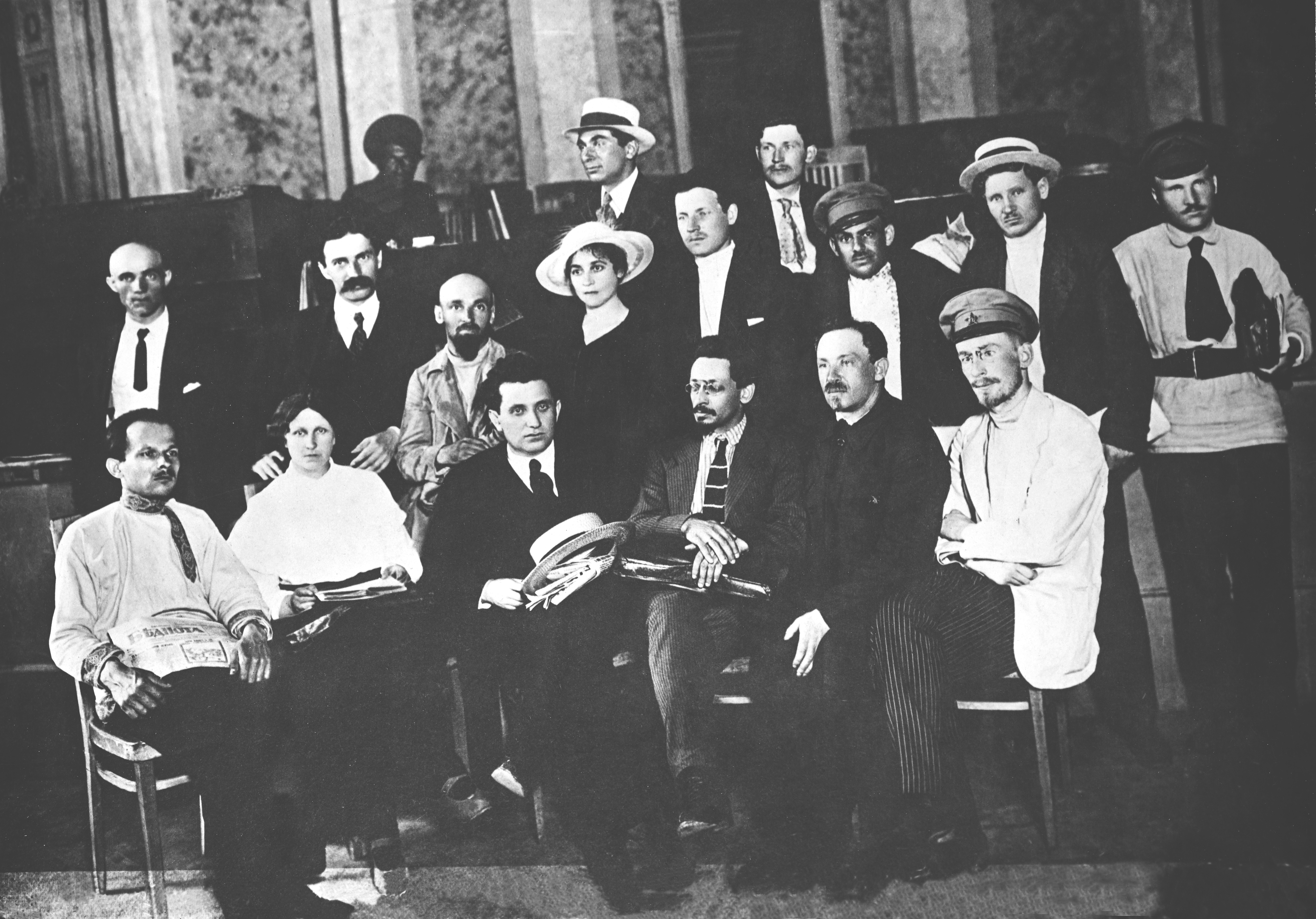
Sverdlov and Grigory Zinoviev on The Fifth All-Russian Congress of Soviets

Following the assassination of Moisei Uritsky and the assassination attempt on Lenin in August 1918, Sverdlov drafted a document that called for "merciless mass terror against all the enemies of the revolution." Under his and Lenin's leadership, the Central Executive Committee adopted Sverdlov's resolution calling for "mass red terror against the bourgeoisie and its agents." During Lenin's recovery Sverdlov moved into Lenin's office in the Kremlin and took over some of Lenin's official obligations, including chairing the meetings of the Council of People's Commissars. He oversaw the interrogation of Lenin's would-be assassin, Fanny Kaplan, and even moved Kaplan from the Cheka headquarters to be held in a basement room underneath Sverdlov's apartment. Sverdlov's deputy Avanesov gave the order for Kaplan's execution and Sverdlov himself personally ordered that the body be "destroyed without a trace."

Sverdlov supported the Red Terror campaign, specifically when it came to the policy of decossackization that was started in 1917 as a part of the Russian Civil War. This policy resulted in the deaths of thousands of Cossacks, while the Soviet government confiscated land and food produced by the Cossack population. Sverdlov wrote that "not a single crime against the revolutionary military spirit will remain unpunished," and that "the only correct strategy is a merciless struggle against the whole Cossack elite by means of their total extermination". This policy was temporarily suspended on 16 March 1919 while Sverdlov was in Ukraine overseeing the election of the Ukrainian Communist Party's central committee.

== Personality ==
For the first 16 months after the Bolshevik revolution, Sverdlov was the third most powerful figure in the Soviet regime, after Lenin and Trotsky. Anatoly Lunacharsky, the People's Commissar for Education, wrote that Sverdlov (not Stalin) was the effective leader of the Bolshevik party during the July disturbances in 1917, when Lenin was in hiding and Trotsky and others were under arrest. According to Lunacharsky: "His memory contained something like a biographical dictionary of communism. In every aspect of character which had a bearing on their fitness as revolutionaries Sverdlov could judge people with extraordinary accuracy and finesse." According to Trotsky, Lenin assumed that if the two of them were killed, it would fall to Sverdlov and Bukharin to take over leadership of the communist party. Though the title did not exist at the time, Sverdlov was the de facto General Secretary of the Communist Party, the post that Stalin took over three years after Sverdlov's death.

Trotsky wrote that:

Sverdlov ... was truly beyond compare: confident, courageous, firm, resourceful – the best type of Bolshevik. It was precisely in those critical months that Lenin came to know and to appreciate Sverdlov. Time and again it happened that Vladimir Ilyich would pick up the phone in order to propose to Sverdlov a particular emergency measure and in most cases the answer he got was “Already.” This meant that the measure had already been adopted. We often made jokes on this topic, saying, “Well, in all likelihood, Sverdlov has it – already.”

== Death ==
Sverdlov's death is most commonly attributed to have died of either typhus or more likely the Spanish flu, contracted after a political visit to Ukraine and Oryol. Kremlin doctors diagnosed him with the Spanish flu. Even as his illness progressed, he continued to perform his duties as chairman of the Central Committee. On 14 March 1919 Sverdlov lost consciousness and on the 16th he died at the age of 33.

Sverdlov is buried in the Kremlin Wall Necropolis in Moscow. Today his grave is one of the twelve individual tombs located between the Lenin Mausoleum and the Kremlin Wall. He was succeeded in an interim capacity by Mikhail Vladimirsky, and eventually by Mikhail Kalinin as Chairman of the Central Executive Committee, and by Elena Stasova as Chairwoman of the Secretariat.

== Family ==
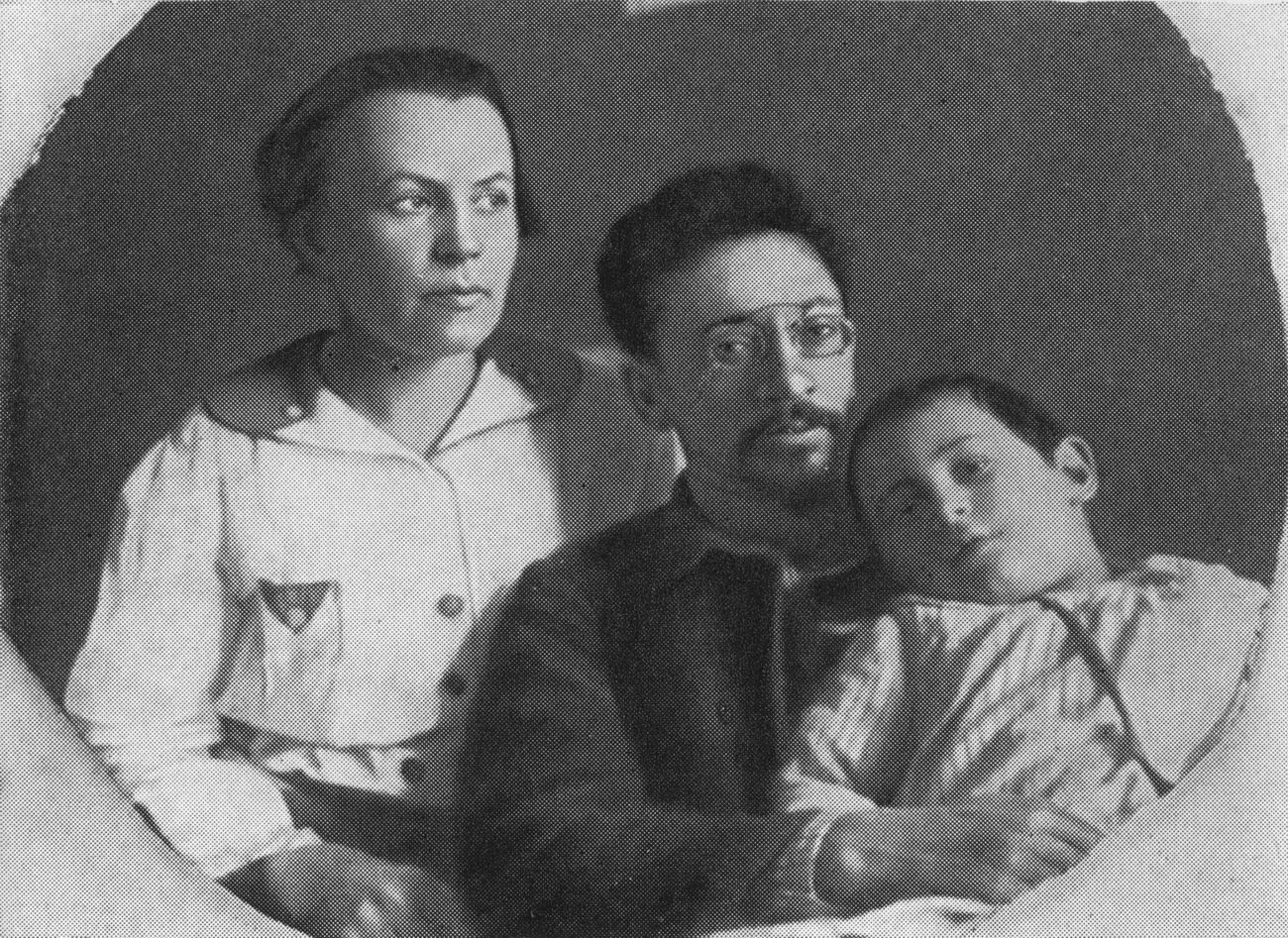
Sverdlov with his wife and son c. 1918–1919

Sverdlov was married to a meteorologist, Klavdia Novgorodtseva (1876–1960), who had joined the Bolsheviks in Yekaterinburg, her home town, in 1904, and was arrested for organising an illegal printing press. She and Sverdlov met after her release, and worked together during the 1905 revolution. In 1906, she represented the Perm Bolshevik at the Fourth RSDLP Congress in Stockholm. She was arrested again when she returned to Perm, and spent a year in prison. Released in 1910, she joined Sverdlov in St Petersburg, and was arrested again in 1910, but because of her pregnancy was sent back to Yekaterinburg. When she returned illegally to St Petersburg in 1912, she was arrested, held in a cell with her infant son, and deported to Siberia. In 1915 Klavdia joined Yakov in exile in the village of Monastyrskoe, where together they ran a Bolshevik reading circle in the town, which, though illegal, escaped the notice of the local authorities. After the Bolshevik revolution, she worked with Sverdlov in the party secretariat. From 1920 until she retired in 1946, she worked in education, as a specialist in children's literature.

Sverdlov and Novgorodtseva had had two children: a son Andrei, who joined the NKVD and became notorious for persecuting other children of eminent Old Bolsheviks, and daughter Vera, born 1915.

Sverdlov's brother, Venyamin (1886–1939), emigrated to the US to become a banker, returning to Russia in 1917, where he was appointed head of the Road Research Institute. He was arrested on 13 October 1938, accused of belonging to the counter-revolutionary terrorist organisation, and shot on 16 April 1939. Sverdlov's sister, Sofia (1883–1951), worked as a doctor married a businessman, Leonid Averbakh, and had two children, a son Leopold, who was shot in 1937, and a daughter, Ida, who married Genrikh Yagoda, the future head of the NKVD, and was shot in June 1938. Sofia was arrested in 1937, sentenced to five years exile in Orenburg, then was arrested again and sentenced to eight years in the gulag. She died in a labour camp in Kolyma.

== Legacy ==
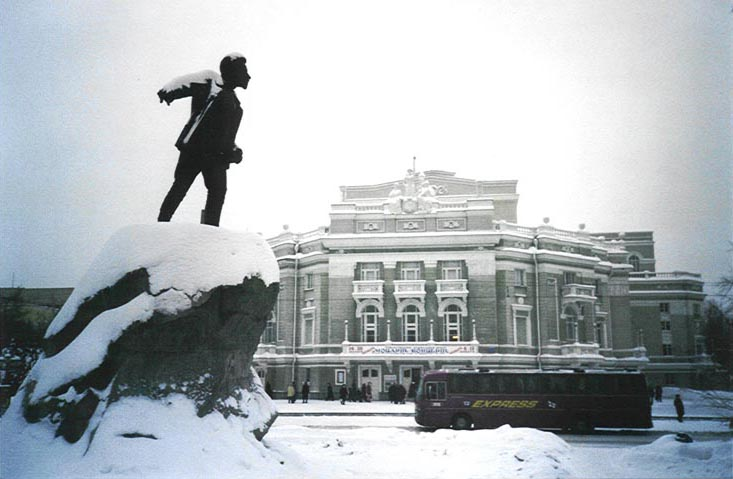
Snow-covered statue of Sverdlov in Yekaterinburg, formerly Sverdlovsk

- In a speech on 18 March 1919 Vladimir Lenin praised Sverdlov and his contributions to the revolution. He called Sverdlov successful "in expressing more fully and consistently than anybody else the most important and fundamental features of the proletarian revolution."
- The Central School for Soviet and Party Work, housed in the former Merchants House, Moscow was renamed the Sverdlov Communist University shortly after Sverdlov's death.
- Two warships have been named in Sverdlov's honor:
  - The Imperial Russian Navy destroyer leader Novik (commissioned during 1913) was renamed Yakov Sverdlov in 1923.
  - Sverdlov, a Cold war-era cruiser and lead ship her class.
- Yekaterinburg, dubbed the "third capital of Russia", as it is ranked third by the size of economy, culture, transportation and tourism, was renamed "Sverdlovsk" in 1924 and returned to its former name in 1991.
- In 1938 a number of Ukrainian settlements as well as the Sverdlov mine (part of Sverdlovantratsyt company in 2010s) were merged into the city of Sverdlovsk, which the Ukrainian government renamed Dovzhansk on 12 May 2016, although the renaming could not be enforced due to the Russo-Ukrainian War.
- A few locations in the former Soviet Union still bear Sverdlov's name, in the Russian Federation and in Kyrgyzstan. Others have been renamed.
- Sverdlov's life was dramatized in an eponymous biographical film released in 1940.

== See also ==
- Outline of the Russian Revolution and Civil War
- Bibliography of the Russian Revolution and Civil War
- Bibliography of Stalinism and the Soviet Union
- Index of Old Bolsheviks
- Index of articles related to the Russian Revolution and Civil War

== Sources ==
- Kotkin, Stephen (2014). Stalin: Volume I: Paradoxes of Power, 1878–1928. Penguin. ISBN 978-1-59420-379-4.
- Khrushchev, Nikita Sergeevich (2006). Memoirs of Nikita Khrushchev. Penn State Press. ISBN 0-271-02861-0.
- Slezkine, Yuri (2011). The Jewish Century. Princeton University Press. ISBN 978-0-691-12760-6.
- Slezkine, Yuri (2019). The House of Government. Princeton University Press. ISBN 978-0-691-19272-7.

Political offices
Preceded by Lev Kamenev	Chairman of the Central Executive Committee of the All-Russian Congress of Soviets; 1917–1919	Succeeded by Mikhail Vladimirsky
