= Old Bolsheviks =

Original members of the RSDLP Bolshevik faction

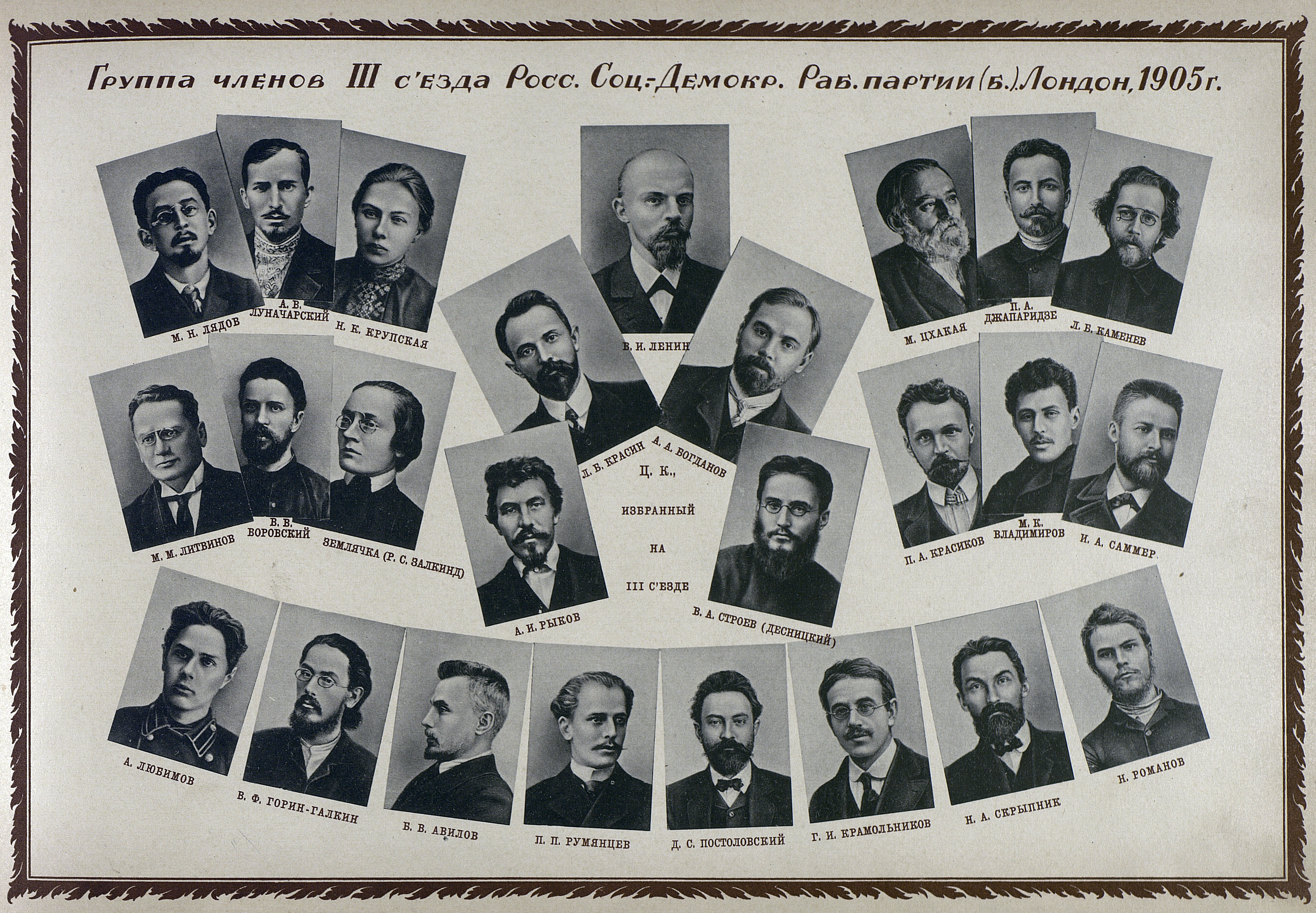
3rd Congress of the RSDLP London, 1905

The Old Bolsheviks (Russian: ста́рый большеви́к, romanized: stary bol'shevik), also called the Old Bolshevik Guard or Old Party Guard, were members of the Bolshevik faction of the Russian Social Democratic Labour Party prior to the October Revolution of 1917. Many Old Bolsheviks became leading politicians and bureaucrats in the Soviet Union and the ruling Communist Party. While some died over the years from natural causes, many were removed from power, imprisoned in gulag camps, or executed by the late 1930s, as a result of the Great Purge by Joseph Stalin.

== Overview ==
=== Definition ===
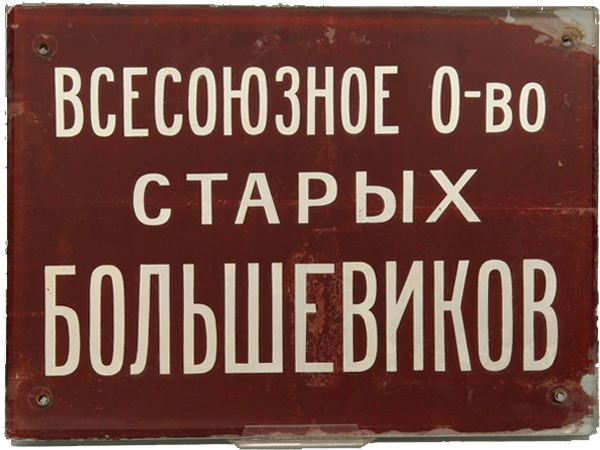
A door sign of the Society of Old Bolsheviks

Initially, the term "Old Bolshevik" referred to Bolsheviks who joined the Russian Social Democratic Labour Party before 1905. On February 13, 1922, under the chairmanship of the Old Bolshevik historian Mikhail Olminsky, the Society of Old Bolsheviks at the Istpart (Commission on the Study of the History of the October Revolution and RCP(b)) was established. The first Statute required membership before January 1, 1905, with admission in some cases of other Social Democrats with the same career time who later joined the Bolsheviks. Initially there were 64 members. Later it was renamed the All-Union Society. The 1931 Statute had a requirement of a continuous party membership of at least 18 years, with exceptions to be granted by the Society Presidium (approved by the Society Council). By 1934, there were over 2,000 members. The All-Union Society was self-dissolved in 1935, announcing that "it has completed its tasks". Vladimir Lenin wrote about the "enormous, undivided authority of that thinnest layer, which can be called the old party guard". Old Bolsheviks that were part of Lenin's inner circle or directly worked with him formed a sub-designation known as the "Lenin Guard" (Ленинская гвардия, leninskaya gvardiya).

Vadim Rogovin cites the statistics published by the 13th Congress of the Russian Communist Party (Bolsheviks) that, in 1924, of 600,000 Party members, 0.6% joined before 1905, 2% joined in 1906–1916 and less than 9% joined in 1917.

=== Presence in the Soviet Union ===
By the end of the Russian Revolution in 1923, Old Bolsheviks filled many of the powerful positions in the state apparatus of the Soviet Union, its constituent republics, and the ruling All-Union Communist Party. Stalin, himself an Old Bolshevik, feared that Old Bolsheviks were potential usurpers who could use their prestige to depose him. Stalin used the assassination of Sergei Kirov in 1934 as a pretext to purge the party and removed a large part of the surviving Old Bolsheviks from positions of power during the Great Purge from 1936 to 1938. Purged Old Bolsheviks were condemned in a series of show trials such as the Moscow Trials, and then executed for treason or imprisoned in the Gulag system of labor camps. By 1938, the number of Old Bolsheviks who remained in power (other than Stalin himself) was small, and the vacant positions were filled by a younger generation of party members who were considered to be more loyal to Stalin himself.

In his memoirs, Nikita Khrushchev argued that Stalin's widespread purges of the "most advanced nucleus of people" among the Old Bolsheviks and leading figures in the military and scientific fields had "undoubtedly" weakened the nation.

Various things in the Soviet Union had the name Old Bolshevik, such as a publishing house, several steamships, motorboats, kolkhozes and populated places.

== Fate of some of the Old Bolsheviks ==
This list lists Old Bolsheviks according to the original definition, i.e. those who joined the Bolshevik faction before 1 January 1905.

=== Died regardless of the purges ===
	Born	Died	Notes
Nikolay Bauman	1873	1905	Sided with Lenin at the 2nd Party Congress (1903). Killed during demonstrations in 1905.
Nikolai Chuzhak	1876	1937	Member of the Bolshevik faction since 1904. Died of natural causes in 1937.
Mikhail Frunze	1885	1925	Bolshevik since 1903.
Maria Iasneva-Golubeva	1861	1936	Joined the Bolsheviks after the second congress of the RSDLP, in 1903.
Sergey Ivanovich Gusev	1874	1933	Member of the SBORK since 1896. Member of the RSDLP since 1898. Founding member of the Bolshevik faction in 1903.
Simon Kamo	1882	1922	Joined Bolsheviks in 1904. Died in a traffic accident.
Lev Karpov	1879	1921	Member of the SBORK. Member of the RSDLP since 1898. Joined the Bolsheviks in 1904.
Sergei Kirov	1886	1934	Joined Bolsheviks in 1904. Kirov's assassination was used as a pretext for Stalin's Great Purge.
Lydia Knipovich	1857	1920	Member of SBORK. Sided with Lenin at the 2nd Party Congress (1903).
Leonid Krasin	1870	1926	Member of the RSDLP since 1898. Bolshevik since 1903. Elected member of the Central Committee in 1903.
Valerian Kuybyshev	1888	1935	Joined the Bolsheviks in 1904.
Mikhail Lashevich	1884	1928	Member of the RSDLP since 1901. Bolshevik since 1903.
Vladimir Lenin	1870	1924	Leader of SBORK since 1895. Member of the RSDLP since 1898. Main founder and leader of the Bolsheviks since 1903.
Anatoly Lunacharsky	1875	1933	Joined Bolsheviks in 1904.
Viktor Nogin	1878	1924	Member of the RSDLP since 1898. Bolshevik since 1903.
Mikhail Olminsky	1863	1933	Member of the RSDLP since 1898. Joined Bolsheviks in 1904. First President of the Society of Old Bolsheviks (1922–1931).
Alexander Parkhomenko	1886	1921	Joined Bolsheviks in 1904. Killed by Makhnovists during the Civil War
Semyon Sereda	1871	1933	Joined Bolsheviks in 1903.
Stepan Shaumian	1878	1918	Member of the RSDLP since 1900. Bolshevik since 1903.
Ivan Skvortsov-Stepanov	1870	1928	Member of the RSDLP since 1898. Joined Bolsheviks in 1904.
Pyotr Smidovich	1874	1935	Member of the RSDLP since 1898.
Sofia Smidovich	1872	1934	Member of the RSDLP since 1898, sided with Bolsheviks in 1903.
Suren Spandaryan	1882	1916	Member of the Bolshevik faction since 1903.
Pēteris Stučka	1865	1932	Member of the RSDLP since 1898. Supported Bolsheviks in 1903.
Yakov Sverdlov	1885	1919	Member of the RSDLP since 1902. Bolshevik since 1903.
Alexander Tsiurupa	1870	1928	Member of the RSDLP since 1898. Bolshevik since 1903.
Anna Ulyanova	1864	1935	Member of the RSDLP since 1898. Sister of Vladimir Lenin, Dmitry Ilyich Ulyanov and Maria Ilyinichna Ulyanova.
Maria Ilyinichna Ulyanova	1878	1937	Member of the RSDLP since 1898. Bolshevik since 1903. Sister of Vladimir Lenin, Dmitry Ilyich Ulyanov and Anna Ulyanova.
Vatslav Vorovsky	1871	1923	Founding member of the Bolshevik faction in 1903. Assassinated by a White émigré.
Vladimir Zagorsky	1883	1919	Member of the RSDLP since 1901. Joined Bolsheviks in Geneva in 1904. Killed by a bomb planted by an anarchist group.

=== Died in the Stalinist purges ===
	Born	Died	Notes
Sultan Majid Afandiyev	1887	1938	Member of the Bolshevik faction since 1904. Sentenced to death and executed.
Alexander Bekzadyan	1879	1938	Member of the Bolshevik faction since 1903. Arrested in 1937. Sentenced to death and executed in 1938.
Gleb Bokii	1879	1937	Bolshevik since at least 1904. Arrested on 16 May 1937, sentenced to death and shot on 15 November 1937.
Andrei Bubnov	1883	1938	Joined the Bolsheviks in 1903. Sentenced to death, then shot on the same day.
Feodor Chuchin	1883	1942	Member of the Bolshevik faction since 1904. Arrested in 1941 and shot in 1942.
Semyon Dimanstein	1886	1938	Member of the Bolshevik faction since 1904. Arrested in February 1938. Sentenced to death and shot in August.
Yuri Petrovich Figatner	1889	1937	Member of the Bolshevik faction since 1903. Sentenced to death, then shot on the same day.
Gaia Gai	1887	1937	Member of the Bolshevik faction of the RSDLP since 1903. Arrested in 1935 and shot in 1937.
Nikolai Glebov-Avilov	1887	1937	Joined the Bolsheviks in 1904. Sentenced to death and shot in March 1937.
Filipp Goloshchyokin	1876	1941	Bolshevik since 1903. Participant at the Prague Conference (1912). Shot without trial by the NKVD in 1941.
Lev Kamenev	1883	1936	Member of the RSDLP since 1901. Bolshevik since 1903. Sentenced to death at the Trial of the Sixteen and executed.
Olga Kameneva	1883	1941	Sister of Leon Trotsky and the first wife of Lev Kamenev. Joined the RSDLP in 1902. Exiled from living in Moscow and Leningrad in 1935, arrested and imprisoned in 1936, and executed in the Medvedev Forest massacre in 1941.
Semyon Kanatchikov	1879	1940	Member of the RSDLP since 1898. Bolshevik since 1903. Arrested by the NKVD in 1936 and sentenced to 8 years. Died in a Gulag.
Aleksei Kiselyov	1879	1937	Member of the RSDLP since 1898. Arrested and shot in 1937.
Nikolai Krylenko	1885	1938	Member of the Bolshevik faction since 1904. Sentenced to death and shot.
Nikolai Kuzmin	1883	1938	Joined Bolsheviks in 1903. Sentenced to death and shot on 8 February 1938.
Polikarp Mdivani	1877	1937	Joined Bolsheviks in 1903. Sentenced to death and executed.
Alexei Medvedev	1884	1937	Member of the RSDLP since 1899. Joined Bolsheviks in 1904. Arrested in August 1937 and shot in October.
Nikolay Muralov	1877	1937	Bolshevik since 1903. Found guilty in the Trial of the Seventeen and executed.
Vladimir Nevsky	1876	1937	Member of the RSDLP since 1898. Bolshevik since 1903. Sentenced to death and shot the next day.
Georgy Oppokov	1888	1937	Member of the Bolshevik faction of the RSDLP since 1903. Arrested in June 1937, and shot in September.
Mamia Orakhelashvili	1881	1937	Joined Bolsheviks in 1903. Sentenced to death in a private trial and executed.
Sergo Ordzhonikidze	1886	1937	Joined Bolsheviks in 1903. Committed suicide after being searched by the NKVD.
Jēkabs Peterss	1886	1938	Member of the Bolshevik faction of the RSDLP since 1904. Аrrested and executed during the Latvian Operation of the NKVD.
Osip Piatnitsky	1882	1938	Member of the RSDLP since 1898. Member of the Bolshevik faction since 1903. Sentenced to death and executed.
Olga Pilatskaya	1884	1937	Member of the Bolshevik faction of the RSDLP since 1904. Arrested and shot.
Pavel Postyshev	1887	1939	Member of the Bolshevik faction of the RSDLP since 1904. Sentenced to death and shot.
Boris Pozern	1882	1939	Member of the Bolshevik faction of the RSDLP since 1904. Arrested in July 1938 and executed in February 1939.
Karl Radek	1885	1939	Sentenced to 10 years at the Trial of the Seventeen in 1937. Killed in prison.
Alexei Rykov	1881	1938	Member of the RSDLP since 1899. Member of the Bolshevik faction since 1903. Found guilty in the Trial of the Twenty-One and executed.
Alexander Serebrovsky	1884	1938	Member of the Bolshevik faction of the RSDLP since 1903. Sentenced to death and shot two days later.
Alexander Shliapnikov	1885	1937	Switched from the Mensheviks to the Bolsheviks in 1903. Sentenced to death and executed.
Alexander Shotman	1880	1937	Member of the RSDLP since 1899. Sided with Lenin at the 2nd Congress of the RSDLP (1903). Sentenced to death and shot in September 1937.
Boris Shumyatsky	1886	1938	Bolshevik since 1903. Sentenced to death and executed by firing squad.
Mykola Skrypnyk	1872	1933	Member of the RSDLP since 1898. Delegate at the 3rd Congress of the RSDL Party (1905). Committed suicide after being removed from power.
Ivan Smirnov	1881	1936	Member of the RSDLP since 1899. Arrested in 1933 and shot in 1936.
Aleksandr Smirnov	1877	1938	Bolshevik since 1903. Sentenced to death and executed.
Mikhail Tomsky	1880	1936	Bolshevik since 1904. Committed suicide before his trial.
Valentin Trifonov	1888	1938	Joined the Bolsheviks in 1904. Arrested and executed during the Great Purge.
Ilya Tsivtsivadze	1881	1938	Bolshevik since 1903. Arrested in 1937. Sentenced to death and shot in March 1938.
Mikhail Vasilyev-Yuzhin	1876	1937	Joined the Bolsheviks in 1903. Arrested in 1937, and shot on 8 November.
Varvara Yakovleva	1884	1941	Joined the Bolsheviks in 1904. Arrested in 1937 by the NKVD, and sentenced to 20 years imprisonment at a secret trial in 1938. Executed in the Medvedev Forest massacre in 1941.
Avel Yenukidze	1877	1937	Member of the RSDLP since 1898. Member of the Bolshevik faction since 1903. Sentenced to death in a private trial and executed.
Tengiz Zhghenti	1887	1937	Member of the Bolshevik faction since 1903. Committed suicide during the Great Purge.
Grigory Zinoviev	1883	1936	Member of the RSDLP since 1901. Bolshevik since 1903. Sentenced to death at the Trial of the Sixteen and executed.

=== Survived the purges ===
	Born	Died	Notes
Vladimir Adoratsky	1878	1945	Member of the Bolshevik faction since 1904.
Aleksei Badayev	1883	1951	Member of the Bolshevik faction since 1904.
Cecilia Bobrovskaya	1873	1960	Member of the RSDLP since 1898. Member of the Bolshevik faction since 1903.
Vladimir Bonch-Bruyevich	1873	1955	Member of the Moscow Workers' Union since 1895. Member of the RSDLP since 1898. Member of the Bolshevik faction since 1903.
Pauls Dauge	1869	1946	Member of the Bolshevik faction since 1903. Arrested during the Great Purge, but survived.
Lydia Fotiyeva	1881	1975	Joined the Bolsheviks in 1904.
Serafima Gopner	1880	1966	Member of the Bolshevik faction since 1903.
Mikhail Kalinin	1875	1946	Member of the RSDLP since 1898. Joined the Bolsheviks in 1903.
Platon Kerzhentsev	1881	1940	Member of the Bolshevik faction of the RSDLP since 1904.
Pyotr Kobozev	1878	1941	Member of the RSDLP since 1898.
Nadezhda Kolesnikova	1882	1964	Member of the Bolshevik faction of the RSDLP since 1904.
Pyotr Krasikov	1870	1939	Member of the Emancipation of Labour since 1892. Member of the RSDLP since 1902. Bolshevik since 1903. Died of illness.
Nadezhda Krupskaya	1869	1939	Member of the RSDLP since 1898. Bolshevik since 1903. Wife of Lenin.
Gleb Krzhizhanovsky	1872	1959	Member of the SBORK since 1895. Member of the RSDLP since 1898. Bolshevik since 1903.
Dora Lazurkina	1884	1974	Member of the RSDLP since 1902. Joined the Bolsheviks in 1904. Spent 17 years in Gulag, but survived.
Olga Lepeshinskaya	1871	1963	Member of the RSDLP since 1898. Bolshevik since 1903.
Maxim Litvinov	1876	1951	Member of the RSDLP since 1898. Joined the Bolsheviks in 1903.
Martyn Liadov	1872	1947	Member of the RSDLP faction since 1898. Bolshevik since 1903.
Ivan Lychev	1881	1972	Member of the Bolshevik faction of the RSDLP since 1904.
Dmitry Manuilsky	1883	1959	Member of the Bolshevik faction of the RSDLP since 1904.
Nikolai Meshcheryakov	1865	1942	Member of the Bolshevik faction since 1903.
Matvei Muranov	1873	1959	Joined the Bolsheviks in 1904.
Grigory Petrovsky	1878	1958	Member of the SBORK since 1897. Member of the RSDLP since 1898. Elected member of the 4th State Duma at the 1912 Russian legislative election.
Nikolai Podvoisky	1880	1948	Member of the Bolshevik faction of the RSDLP since 1903.
Viktor Radus-Zenkovich	1877	1967	Member of the RSDLP since 1898. Bolshevik since 1903.
Vladimir Antonov-Saratovsky	1884	1965	Member of the RSDLP since 1902. Member of the Bolshevik faction since 1903.
Maximilian Saveliev	1884	1939	Bolshevik since 1903.
Nikolai Semashko	1878	1949	Bolshevik since 1904. Elected member of the Central Committee in 1907.
Alexander Schlichter	1868	1940	Bolshevik since 1903.
Andrey Shestakov	1877	1941	Member of the Bolshevik faction of the RSDLP since 1903.
Konstantin Shvedchikov	1884	1952	Member of the Bolshevik faction since 1904.
Aaron Soltz	1872	1945	Member of the RSDLP since 1898. Sent to a psychiatric clinic during the Great Purge, but survived.
Joseph Stalin	1878	1953	Member of the RSDLP since 1898. Member of the Bolshevik faction since 1903. Leader of the USSR during 1924–1953.
Elena Stasova	1873	1966	Member of the RSDLP since 1898. Bolshevik since 1903.
Adolf Taimi	1881	1955	Member of the Bolshevik faction since 1903.
Mikhail Tskhakaya	1865	1950	Member of the RSDLP since 1898. Bolshevik since 1903.
Dmitry Ilyich Ulyanov	1874	1943	Bolshevik since 1903. Brother of Vladimir Lenin, Maria Ilyinichna Ulyanova and Anna Ulyanova.
Alexander Vinokurov	1869	1944	Member of the Bolshevik faction of the RSDLP since 1903.
Mikhail Vladimirsky	1874	1951	Member of the Moscow Workers' Union since 1895. Member of the RSDLP since 1898. Bolshevik since 1903.
Boris Volin	1886	1957	Member of the Bolshevik faction since 1904.
Yemelyan Yaroslavsky	1878	1943	Member of the RSDLP since 1898. Bolshevik since 1903. President of the Society of Old Bolsheviks (1931–1935).
Rosalia Zemlyachka	1876	1947	Member of the RSDLP since 1898. Elected member of the Central Committee in 1903.
Konstantin Zharnovetsky	1881	1941	Member of the Bolshevik faction of the RSDLP since 1904. Died during the Siege of Leningrad.

== See also ==
- Alter Kämpfer
- Index of Old Bolsheviks
- Bibliography of the Russian Revolution and Civil War
- Bibliography of Stalinism and the Soviet Union
- Index of articles related to the Russian Revolution and Civil War
- Outline of the Russian Revolution and Civil War
