= Iosif Dubrovinsky =

Russian revolutionary (1877–1913)

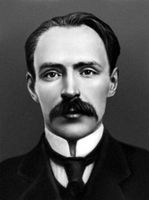
- Joseph Dubrovinsky
- Born: August 26, 1877; Pokrovskoye-Lipovets, Russian Empire
- Died: June 1, 1913 (aged 35); Turukhansk, Russian Empire
- Political party: Russian Social Democratic Labour Party

Iosif Fyodorovich Dubrovinsky, alias Innokenty (Russian: Иосиф Фёдорович Дубровинский; 26 August [O.S. 14 August] 1877 – 1 June [O.S. 19 May] 1913) was a Bolshevik and comrade of Vladimir Lenin prior to the Russian Revolution.

== Early career ==
Dubrovinsky was born in the village of Pokrovskoye-Lipovets, in the Maloangelsk district of Orel, the second of four sons of a mechanic, who died in 1882, soon after the birth of the fourth son. He was the elder brother fellow Bolshevik revolutionary Yakov Dubrovisnky His widowed mother, Lyubov, moved with all four boys to Kursk, then returned in 1895 to Orel. As a schoolboy in Kursk, Dubrovinsky joined a populist circle modelled on Narodnaya Volya, the group that assassinated the Tsar Alexander II, but later became a Marxist. From about the age of 18, he was a full-time revolutionary. He was arrested in December 1897, as an organiser of a workers' circle in Moscow, and the following year was sentenced to four years exile in Siberia. While there, he contracted tuberculosis. In 1902 he was moved to Astrakhan, where he made contact with the illegal newspaper Iskra, of which Lenin was the main organiser, and acted as its local distributor. He joined the Bolsheviks after the party split in 1903.

== Role in the 1905 revolution ==
Arrested in February 1905, Dubrovinsky was released under amnesty in October. The Bolsheviks sent him to the naval base in Kronstadt, where, on 23 October, he addressed a crowd of thousands, who agreed resolution calling for better conditions for servicemen, and political demands for the overthrow of the monarchy and the creation of a democratic republic. The following day, thousands demonstrated, and for a couple of days Kronstadt was under rebel control, but martial law was imposed and thousands arrested, though Dubrovinsky slipped past the police by pretending to be blind drunk. He moved to Moscow, where he took part in the armed rising in December. He was arrested again in the summer of 1906.

== Later career ==
Dubrovinsky was released in February 1907, and joined Lenin in Finland, which was under Russian rule. He was a delegate to the Fifth Congress of the Russian Social Democratic Labour Party in London, in May 1907 - the last major gathering before the revolution at which both Bolsheviks and Mensheviks were present, and afterwards was elected to the 15 member Bolshevik Centre. He was almost the only member of that Centre to back Lenin over the issue of armed robberies carried in Georgia by revolutionaries secretly directed by 'Koba' (later known as Stalin) to raise funds for the party, but he opposed Lenin over the question of whether to have a final break with the Mensheviks. After the Congress, he returned to Russia to try to rebuild the party organisation, shattered by the defeat of the 1905 revolution. In February 1908 he joined Lenin in Geneva, where he was part of a triumvirate, which also included Alexander Bogdanov, running the Bolshevik publication, Vperyod (Forward). When this group split up, he supported Lenin against Bogdanov. He returned to Russian jurisdiction, hoping to unite the various illegal Marxist groups, but was arrested in Warsaw in November 1908, and was deported to Solvychegodsk, in north Russia, in iron fetters that left deep wounds in his legs. He escaped and joined Lenin in Paris in 1910.

== Death ==
Dubrovinsky returned to Russia, where he was arrested for the final time in June 1910, and exiled to Turukhansk in Siberia. Returning to Russia again, in 1910, he was soon arrested and exiled. On 1 June, he drowned in the Yenisei River - ironically around the time when he stood a chance of being released under an amnesty to mark the Romanov Tercentenary. He left behind a library, which was appropriated by Stalin, who was also in exile in Turukhansk - an act which other exiles resented.

There are two stories around his death. One is that his tuberculosis was so severe that he committed suicide. Lenin's widow, Nadezhda Krupskaya recorded that he was very ill he arrived in Paris, and needed extensive medical treatment. Another theory is that he went out in a boat and was swept under by the powerful current.

== Personality ==
There is no doubt that if Dubrovinsky had lived a few years longer, he would have played a major role in the early years of Bolshevik rule in Russia.

Lenin's widow recorded that the Bolshevik leader "saw how completely devoted Innokenty was to the revolutionary cause...(and) how resolute Innokenty was in the struggle ... prized Innokenty greatly for his fervent devotion to the cause...(and) became very attached to Innokenty." In 1924, Stalin said that "of all the outstanding organisers I am acquainted with, I know only two, of whom, next to Lenin, our Party can and should be proud: I. F. Dubrovinsky, who died in exile in Turukbansk, and Y. M. Sverdlov, who worked himself to death in building the Party and the state."
