= Proletarian Revolution (journal) =

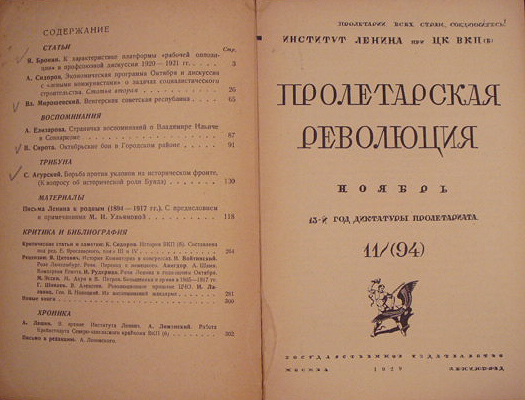
- Discipline: History of the workers' revolutionary movements
- Language: Russian

Publication details
- History: 1921–1941
- Frequency: Varied

Standard abbreviations
- ISO 4: Prolet. Revolut.

Indexing
- LCCN: 48042157
- OCLC no.: 7013012

Proletarian Revolution (Russian: Пролетарская революция) was a Soviet historical journal published in Moscow from 1921 to 1941. In a review of the first issue, Ilya Vardin reported the journal as declaring "Our goal is precisely to help the writing of the history of the proletarian revolution in Russia. Nobody will read documentary raw materials, except the historians themselves, and we need books that would be read by both workers and students."

== Istpart period ==
From 1921 to 1928 it was published by Istpart, the History of the Party Department, a commission originally founded by the Russian Communist Party (Bolsheviks). The purpose of the journal was to publish articles, documents and memoirs on the history of the workers' movement, the Communist Party, the October Revolution and the Civil War as well as materials about prominent leaders of the party and the workers' and social democratic movement.

== Lenin Institute period ==
From 1928 to 1931 it was published by the Lenin Institute.

In 1931, Joseph Stalin sent a letter, "Some Questions Concerning the History of Bolshevism" to the magazine sharply criticizing the published article by Anatoly Slutsky, "The Bolsheviks on German Social Democracy in the Period of its Pre-War Crisis", describing it as anti-party and half-Trotskyist. In turn, this letter was also published in the journal.

== Marx–Engels–Lenin Institute period ==
From 1933 to 1941 it was published by the Marx–Engels–Lenin Institute.

== Editors ==
At various times the journal was edited by: M. S. Olminsky, S. I. Kanatchikov, M. A. Saveliev, V. G. Knorin, V. G. Sorin and M. B. Mitin.
