= Fedor Samoilov =

Fedor Nikitich Samoilov
- Фёдор Никитич Самойлов
- Samoilov in 1914

Deputy of the Fourth Imperial Duma
- In office 1912 – November 1914

Chairman of the Ivanovo-Voznesensky Soviet
- In office March 1917 – 1918

Deputy People's Commissar of Labour of the Ukrainian SSR
- In office 1919–1921

Candidate member of the Central Control Commission of the RCP(b)
- In office 2 April 1922 – 17 April 1923

Personal details
- Born: 24 April [O.S. 12 April] 1882 Gomilenki, Kovrovsky District, Vladimir Governorate, Russian Empire
- Died: 13 June 1952 (aged 70) Kratovo, Moscow Oblast, Russian SFSR, Soviet Union
- Party: RSDLP (from 1903); RSDLP (Bolsheviks); All-Union Communist Party (Bolsheviks)

Fedor Nikitich Samoilov (Russian: Фёдор Никитич Самойлов; 24 April 1882 – 13 June 1952) was a Russian and Soviet textile worker, politician, and revolutionary. Born into a peasant family in the Vladimir Governorate, Samoilov worked in the textile industry, joining the Russian Social Democratic Labour Party (RSDLP) in 1903. He quickly became a leader of the party in the city of Ivanovo and played a role in the 1905 Revolution.

In 1912, Samoilov was elected to the Duma as a member of the RSDLP, aligned with the Bolsheviks. In early 1914, Samoilov fell ill and was invited by Vladimir Lenin to visit him in Kraków, where Lenin was then living in exile. There, Lenin suggested Samoilov seek treatment in Switzerland. He returned to Russia in late 1914 where along with the other Bolshevik members of the Duma, he was arrested and exile to Siberia.

He was released in early 1917 where he led the revolutionary effort in his home of Vladimir and became the Chairman of the Ivanovo-Voznesensky Soviet. Following the October Revolution, he held numerous posts in the Soviet government. He died in 1952.

== Early life ==
Fedor Nikitich Samoilov was born into a peasant family on 24 April 1882 in the village of Gomilenki, and was the eldest of three sons of Nikita Nikanorovich Samoilov and Darya Mikhailovna Samoilova. Until the age of six, Samoilov lived in a family of twelve, consisting of his mother and father, grandfather, three grandmothers, two aunts, one uncle, his siblings, and himself. The entire family was illiterate except for Nikita who had taught himself how to read.

In the winter of 1893, the factory that Nikita, worked at burned down. This, along with bad harvests in the area, made it difficult for Nikita to find work in the area, pushing the family into hunger and poverty. Nikita managed to find work as a sawyer in a nearby forest, allowing the family to survive during the autumn and summer. In the winter of 1894, the Nikita became employed as a textile weaver in the nearby city of Ivanovo. The job required Nikita to work in Ivanovo year-round, and as such, the whole family moved to the city. Initially, Nikita was hesitant to move the family to Ivanovo, but on the insistence of Fedor, his mother, and his brother, as well as influenced by poor harvest on their Gomilenki allotment, the family sold its cow and moved.

It was at this time that Fedor got his first job at the age of 12, at a hotel in the centre of Ivanovo. He worked for 18 hours a day and was only allowed three days off a year. Samoilov later recalled that his work environment was harsh, with the adult staff frequently drinking, and the owner showing more concern for broken dishes than for injured workers. He also recalled that a cook's assistant was severely beaten by his superior, and that the owner refused to take the assistant's complaint the court.

In the spring of 1896, at age 14, Samoilov left the hotel to work in a small shop selling musical instruments, wallpaper, and hunting supplies, where he performed the duties of a clerk, working long hours and running errands for the owner's family. After about a year and a half, having turned 15, he decided to leave the shop for factory work, and despite his father's initial hesitation, a position was found for him in mid-1897. He began work at the factory measuring calico on a machine, in a deafeningly noisy room filled with cotton dust.

In the spring of 1898, the Samoilov family made the decision to move back to the village, however Fedor remained alone in Ivanovo to work at the factory.

Samoilov joined the Russian Social Democratic Labour Party (RSDLP) in 1903. During the 1905 Revolution, Samoilov was one of the leaders of the general strike in Ivanovo and was a member of the Northern Committee of the RSDLP. From 1906 until 1908, he was the chairman of the textile printer's union, and was a member of one of Russia's first soviets.

== Fourth State Duma ==
From the founding of Pravda in May 1912, Samoilov was actively involved with the newspaper. In January–February 1913, Pravda published a series of articles by Samoilov and other deputies under the heading "Impressions of Social Democratic Deputies from the Provinces." Samoilov also helped distribute confiscated issues of Pravda to local organizations via secret addresses, and played a key role in supplying the newspaper to the Ivanovo-Voznesensk region, where the Vladimir governor complained that his articles aroused workers against the authorities. He was also involved in establishing the Moscow workers' newspaper Nash Put in 1913.

Samoilov was elected to the Fourth State Duma of the Russian Empire at the election of September 1912, along with five other Bolsheviks. The RSDLP was initially a united front in the fourth Duma, but relations between the Bolsheviks and Mensheviks quickly broke down. Following the split, Samoilov became the treasurer of the Bolshevik faction.

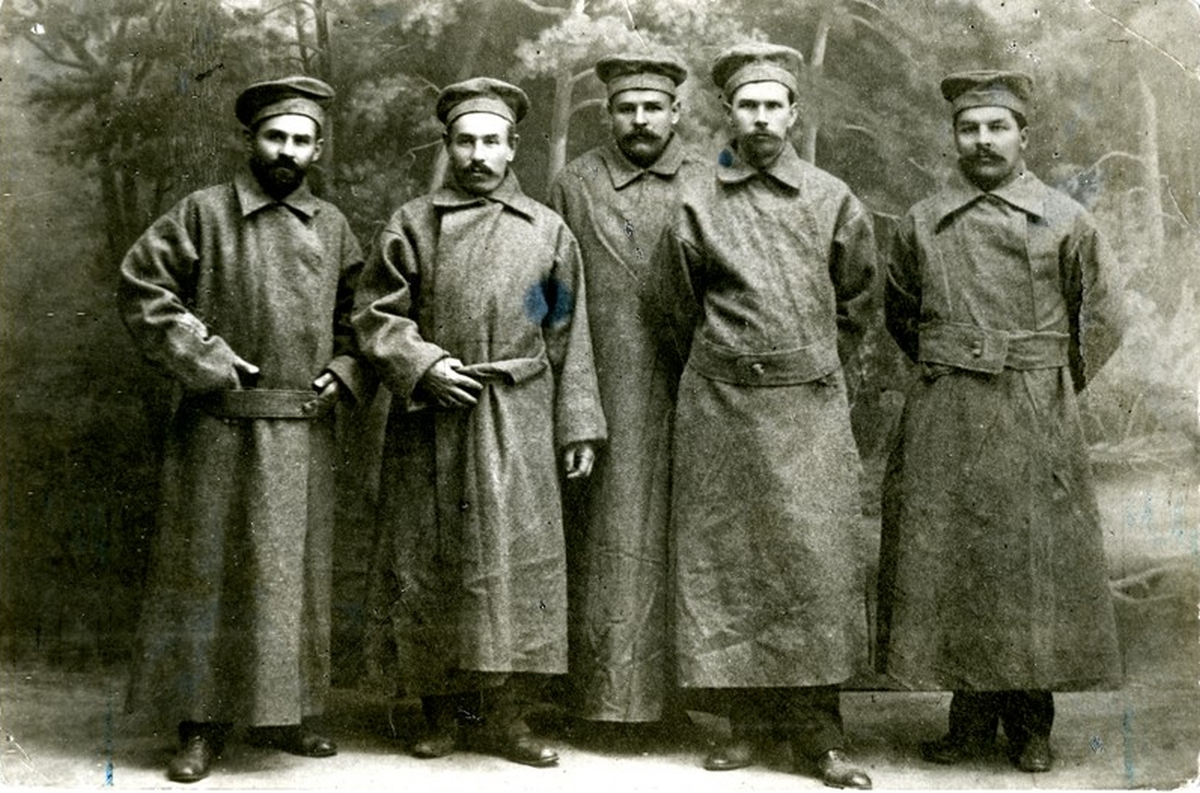
The Bolshevik deputies of the Fourth State Duma (from left to right): Grigory Petrovsky, Matvei Muranov, Alexei Badayev, Fedor Samoilov, and Nikolai Shagov

In November 1913, Samoilov spoke in the State Duma on educational policy, and Lenin later praised him for ably formulating the proletarian position against segregating schools by nationality.

Samoilov returned to Petrograd in January 1914, but found himself in poor health. He was invited to Kraków later that month by Vladimir Lenin after learning of his poor health. Upon his arrival, he was welcomed by Nadezhda Krupskaya and, several days later, met Lenin in person for the first time, finding him to be a simple, unassuming man with unusually penetrating eyes. Both Lenin and Krupskaya, although interested in the news Samoilov had brought back from Russia, limited his talking time during conversations, insisting he not tire himself. Lenin arranged for Samoilov to see a prominent physician, Dr. Landau, who recommended treatment in Switzerland.

In February 1914, Lenin wrote to Samoilov, who was then recuperating in Switzerland, advising him to rest, eat well, drink milk, monitor his weight, and see a doctor regularly, while also offering to arrange visitors if he felt lonely. In April, Lenin wrote to fellow Bolshevik Grigory Shklovsky expressing concern that Samoilov's health had worsened while receiving treatment in Switzerland, with insomnia and boredom hindering his recovery. Lenin arranged for a referral to a nerve specialist and a sanatorium in Vevey, urging Shklovsky to ensure Samoilov received proper care and to spend what was necessary, as the party needed him restored to health by autumn. In May, Lenin wrote to Shklovsky asking why he had not replied about arranging manual work for Samoilov, which a nerve specialist had advised as part of his treatment.

Samoilov noted that he corresponded regularly with Lenin during his time in Switzerland, but all of Lenin's letters to him were burned during his arrest in Petrograd later that year, along with many other materials. By July, Samoilov felt well enough to prepare for his return to Russia, but the outbreak of the First World War prevented his departure.

He later received a telegram from Lenin, then in Austria, requesting money, and using his salary as a Duma deputy, which had recently arrived from Petrograd, he sent 500 francs. Samoilov was later told that Lenin did not receive the sum, as Lenin was only informed that a postal order had arrived in his name but could not be released to him, given his status as a citizen of a country at war with Austria.

Samoilov also recalled being surveilled by Swiss police, who suspected him of spying for Russia because of his correspondence with Lenin. After several political emigrants with whom he was in contact were unexpectedly arrested, he noticed unfamiliar men on bicycles watching him from near the villa where he was staying. Samoilov also discovered that the police had intended to arrest him as well but did not dare, given his status as a Duma deputy, fearing "diplomatic complications." This diminished Samoilov's view of Switzerland, which he had until then viewed as the world's most democratic country.

In another letter to Shklovsky on 31 July 1914, Lenin stressed that Samoilov should attend the International Socialist Congress—which had been rescheduled to Paris for 9 August due to the outbreak of war between Austria and Serbia—if his health allowed, since other Duma deputies might not arrive from Russia, and asked Shklovsky to arrange travel and accommodation for him near the city. Lenin also requested a coded telegram reply—"jedet" if Samoilov could go, "jedem" if both were going, or "nievozmozno" if it was impossible.

== Arrest and exile ==
In late July 1914, Russia entered into World War I. At a Bolshevik conference held in early November, at which Samoilov was a delegate, the party began to organise a campaign to oppose the war. The conference was held in a private apartment on 28 Viborg Road, Ozyorky, a suburb on the outskirts of Petrograd where the Gavrilovs, factory clerk and his wife, lived. However, at 5 p.m. on 4 November, the third day of the conference, police broke into the conference. The police began to search and arrest those who were present, although the delegates of the conference claimed that they were only meeting to celebrate the wedding anniversary of the Gavrilovs. The members of the Duma present protested, claiming that as members of the Duma, they could not be searched without authorisation from the Duma. After an initial movement of hesitation, the police ignored their protests and arrested them, confiscated their positions, including Samoilov's notebook and pamphlets he had in his possession.

After the search, all delegates of the conference except for those who were members of the Duma were taken to prison. The Duma members, however, were released. The Duma members, no longer believing they had the immunity they once enjoyed, quickly got to work destroying sensitive party documents they had in their apartments, particularly contact lists of members, which they feared could lead to thousands of party members being imprisoned or exiled should they fall into police hands. Such documents were previously stored in the houses of deputies as they were believed to be the safest places for them.

On the night of 5-6 November, the Bolshevik deputies were arrested. The deputies were held in solitary confinement and isolated from the outside world until their trial. While in custody, the delegates repeatedly stressed that they were not holding a conference in the apartment, but simply having a gathering, however as they were unable to communicate with each other, they offered different explanations. They had previously agreed that they should prevent the police from finding out they had held a conference and that they were simply guests of Mrs. Gavrilov. Samoylov told the examining magistrate that the delegates had met there by accident, while Lev Kamenev claimed they were meeting in order to negotiate the publication of a worker's newspaper, and Alexei Badayev claimed he was there "at the personal invitation of Mrs. Gavrilov."

Although the government had initially considered trying the deputies by court-martial, Nicholas II ordered the case transferred to an ordinary civil court. On 9 February 1915, the day before the trial began, the Petrograd Committee of the Bolshevik Party issued a proclamation calling on workers to strike and demonstrate in protest against the prosecution of the deputies. However, the police, operating under martial law, flooded the factories and streets with officers to prevent large-scale action; nevertheless, several strikes broke out and students held protest meetings.

At the trial, Samoilov was the last of the Bolsheviks to address the court. He explained that he had been ill and had spent several months abroad for medical treatment, and that upon his return to Petrograd in early November he had attended the gathering simply to learn about recent events and to meet with Voronin, one of the delegates present. In his memoirs, Samoilov condemned Kamenev's behavior at the trail, describing him as "a despicable coward" and a "traitor". This was due to Kamenev attempting to prove he was a patriot and supported the Russian cause in the war. Samoilov believed that Kamenev should have set the tone for the Bolsheviks behavior at the trail but failed to do so.

The delegates of the conference were charged under Article 102, part 1, of the Criminal Code, which provided a penalty of up to eight years' hard labour for belonging to an association aimed at overthrowing the existing regime. The delegates were held in Petrograd for a few months before being exiled to Turukhansk in Siberia, where other Bolsheviks such as Joseph Stalin and Yakov Sverdlov were already living in exile.

== Russian Revolution ==
Samoilov and the other prisoners were released following the February Revolution. In March Samoilov became the Chairman of the Ivanovo-Voznesensky Soviet, a position he would hold until 1918.

Samoilov was among the Bolsheviks who greeted Lenin at Finland Station upon his return to Petrograd on 3 April 1917. He recalled the festive atmosphere, with workers, soldiers, and sailors filling the square, red flags and torches illuminating the night, and Lenin being carried through the crowd. From the balcony of the Kshesinskaia Palace, Lenin repeated his call for a socialist revolution.

The following morning, 4 April, Samoilov attended the Bolshevik meeting where Lenin delivered his April Theses. As Samoilov climbed the stairs to the meeting room, Lenin recognized him, stopped to ask about his health and how he had endured deportation, and advised him to see a specialist for proper medical care. Samoilov described Lenin's report as a "real revelation," decisively proclaiming the transition from the bourgeois-democratic revolution to a socialist revolution that would transfer power to the proletariat and poor peasantry, and calling for the Republic of Soviets as the most perfect form of state during the transition from capitalism to socialism. Lenin also proposed renaming the party from "Social Democratic" to "Communist", arguing that the name had been compromised by Mensheviks and Western European social chauvinists who had betrayed socialism. Samoilov recalled that when Lenin repeated his report before a broader audience at the Duma, Menshevik leaders responded with hostility, with one declaring that their paths had parted, which Samoilov saw as confirmation that the Mensheviks had aligned themselves with the "imperialist bourgeoisie".

== Later life ==
Following the revolution, Samoilov served as secretary of the Ivanovo-Voznesensk party committee, provincial commissar of labour, and chairman of the provincial revolutionary tribunal in 1917–1918. He then held the position of Deputy People's Commissar of Labour of the Ukrainian SSR from 1919 to 1921. From April 1922 to April 1923, he was a candidate member of the Central Control Commission of the Bolshevik Party. From 1922 to 1928, he was deputy head of Istpart (the Commission on the History of the October Revolution and the Russian Communist Party) under the Central Committee, and from 1928 he headed Istpart under the Moscow Committee of the party. From 1932 he served as deputy chairman of the All-Union Society of Old Bolsheviks, and from 1937 to 1941 he was director of the Museum of the Revolution of the USSR.

Samoilov died on 13 June 1952 in Kratovo, Moscow Oblast. He authored a memoir, Po sledam minuvshego (In the Wake of the Past), published in 1940.
