= Kharkov electoral district =

Kharkov
- Former Civilian constituency for the All-Russian Constituent Assembly
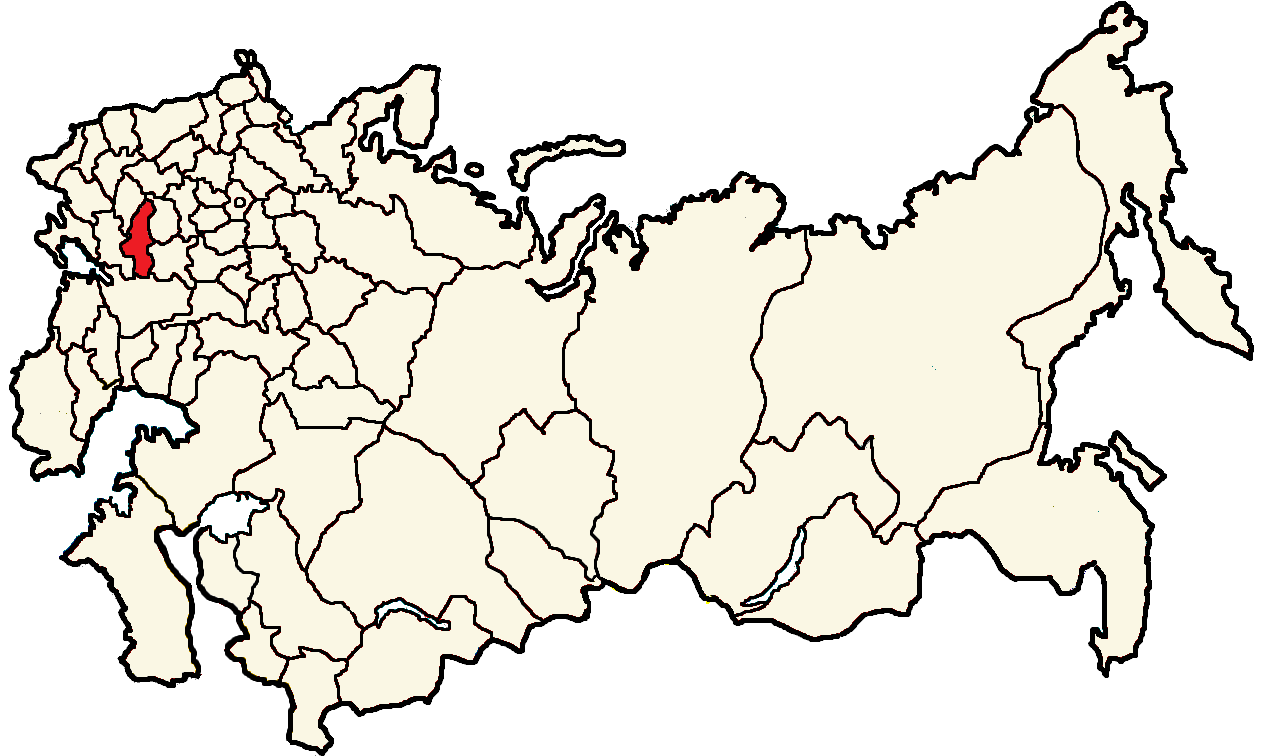

Former constituency
- Created: 1917
- Abolished: 1918
- Number of members: 15
- Number of Uyezd Electoral Commissions: 11
- Number of Urban Electoral Commissions: 2
- Number of Parishes: 251

The Kharkov electoral district (Russian: Харьковский избирательный округ) was a constituency created for the 1917 Russian Constituent Assembly election. The electoral district covered the Kharkov Governorate.

The official Socialist-Revolutionary Party list in Kharkov was dominated by the left-wing faction of the party, contesting jointly with the Ukrainian Socialist-Revolutionary Party. This list, List no. 5, won an overwhelming victory; a predictable development as these groups heavily dominated the soviets in the area and played the most prominent role in the campaigning ahead of the polls. The list also carried an older narodniks' name of "Zemlia i volia" (see Land and Liberty (Russia)).

On July 25, 1917 the Kharkov Provincial Soviet of Peasants Deputies adopted a resolution, put forth by its executive committee, declaring that the Kharkov Soviet would not field a list of its own but ordered all local soviets to support the SR-Ukrainian SR list. The right-wing pro-war SR faction had its own list, a "garrison soldiers' and peasants' list", headed by E.K. Breshko-Breshkovskaia. The Kharkov Provincial Soviet Executive Committee denounced the right-wing SR list, declaring on October 13, 1917 that the Soviet would campaign against the list and that all of the candidates on the list as expelled from the Socialist-Revolutionary Party.

Whilst trailing far behind the SRs across the country-side, the Bolsheviks won the election in Kharkov city.

== Results ==
Kharkov
Party	Vote	%
List 5 -Socialist-Revolutionaries and Ukrainian SRs	795,558	72.82
List 3 - Bolsheviks	114,743	10.50
List 6 - Kadets	58,302	5.34
List 15 - SR Defencists	42,331	3.87
List 2 - Landowners	13,847	1.27
List 4 - Menshevik-Internationalists	12,192	1.12
List 11 - Popular Socialists	11,852	1.08
List 1 - [Orthodox] Parishes	10,478	0.96
List 12 - Commercial-Industrial	6,543	0.60
List 10 - Jewish National Bloc	6,366	0.58
List 9 - Menshevik Defencists	6,024	0.55
List 16 - Germans	5,221	0.48
List 7 - E. Abramov	3,776	0.35
List 14 - Unity	2,293	0.21
List 13 - Serp	917	0.08
List 8 - Poalei Zion	875	0.08
List 19 - Cooperators and Unity	590	0.05
List 18 - Peasants of Zmiyevsky Uezd	311	0.03
List 17 - Peasants of Sumy Uezd	229	0.02
Total:	1,092,448	

Deputies Elected
Muranov	Bolshevik
Sergeyev	Bolshevik
Alekseev	SR
Dyakonov	SR
Kachinsky-Oreshin	SR
Karelin	SR
Kravchenko	SR
Mikhailichenko	SR
Ovcharenko	SR
Popov	SR
Severov-Odoyevsky	SR
Shkorbatov	SR
Streltsov	SR
Svyatitsky	SR
