= Russian State Archive of Socio-Political History =

Archive in Moscow with pre-1952 CPSU documents

- Российский государственный архив социально-политической истории RGASPI
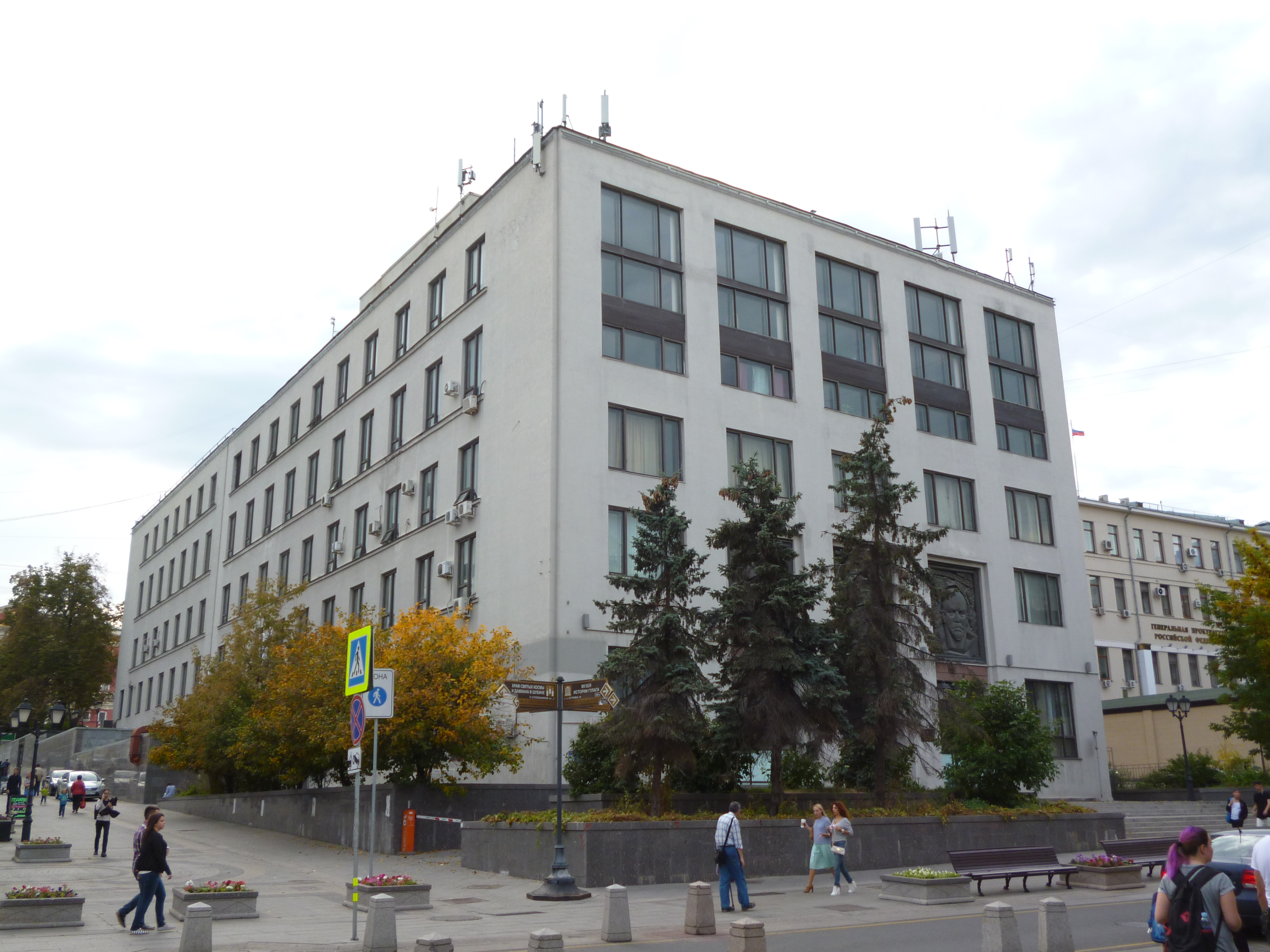
- The building on Tverskaya Square in Moscow where RGASPI is located, c. 2015
- Interactive map of Russian State Archive of Socio-Political History
- 55°45′45″N 37°36′44″E
- Location: 15 Bolshaya Dmitrovka Street, Tverskoy, Moscow, Central, Russia
- Type: State
- Established: 1999; 27 years ago
- Affiliation: Rosarkhiv
- Period covered: Modern era

Building information
- Architect: Sergey Chernyshyov
- Construction date: 1926-27
- Website: rgaspi.org

The Russian State Archive of Socio-Political History (Russian: Российский государственный архив социально-политической истории (РГАСПИ), RGASPI) is a Russian state archive based in Moscow, which holds pre-1952 archives of the Communist Party of the Soviet Union (CPSU). It is managed by Rosarkhiv. It was established in 1999 as merger of two other archives, the Russian Centre for the Preservation and Study of Documents of Most Recent History (RTsKhIDNI, Russian: Российский центр хранения и изучения документов новейшей истории (РЦХИДНИ) and the Centre for the Preservation of Documents of Youth Organisations (Russian: Центр хранения документов молодежных организаций (ЦХДМО)).

The archives include many of the personal papers of major Communist and Soviet leaders, including Nikolai Bukharin, Felix Dzerzhinsky, Lazar Kaganovich, Mikhail Kalinin, Lev Kamenev, Sergei Kirov, Georgy Malenkov, Anastas Mikoyan, V. M. Molotov, Joseph Stalin, Leon Trotsky, and Grigory Zinoviev, as well as Russian non-Bolshevik Marxist thinkers such as Georgi Plekhanov.

== See also ==
- Marx–Engels–Lenin Institute
- Venona project
