= Marx–Engels–Lenin Institute =

Soviet Union library and archive

- Институт Маркса — Энгельса — Ленина
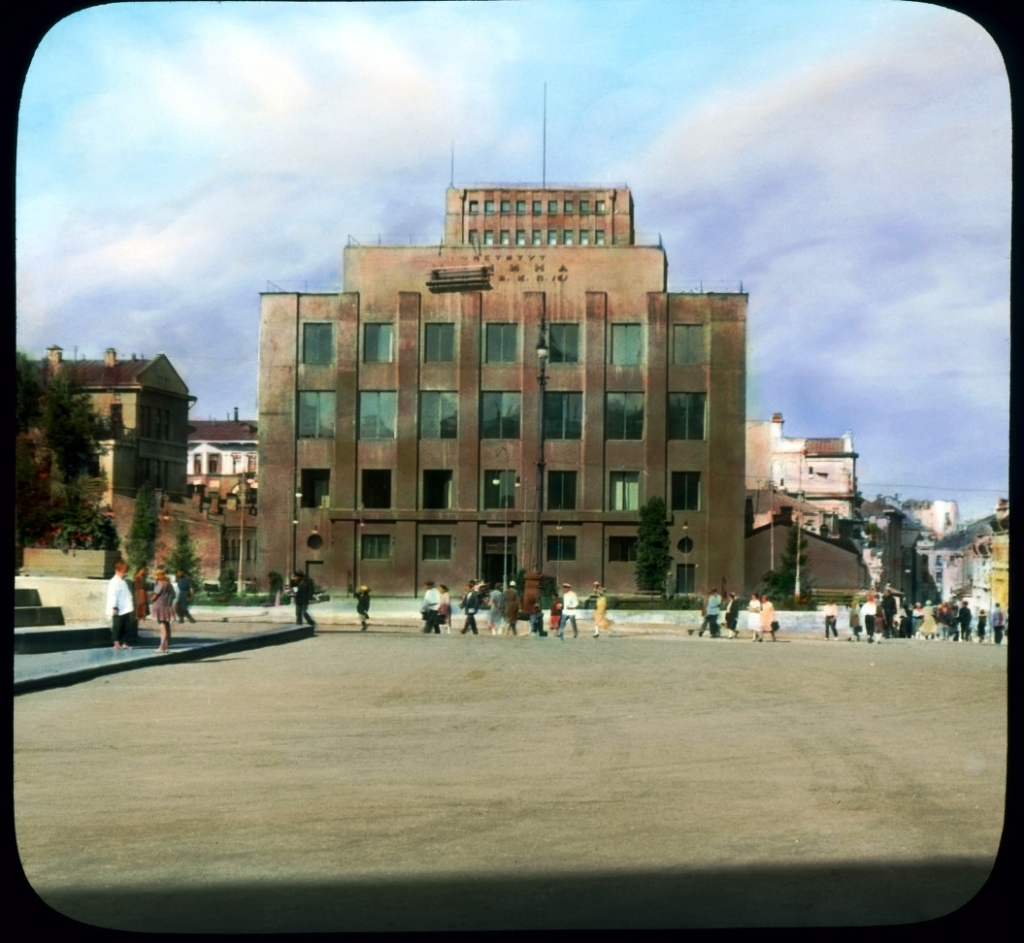
- The Lenin Institute building in Moscow, 1931. From a slide by Branson DeCou
- Named after: Karl Marx; Friedrich Engels; Vladimir Lenin
- Predecessor: Marx–Engels Institute
- Successor: RGASPI
- Formation: 1919
- Founder: David Riazanov
- Dissolved: 1991
- Location: Khamovniki, Moscow
- Publication: Arkhiv Karla Marksa i Friderikha Engel'sa; Letopis' marksizma
- Formerly called: Marx–Engels Institute (1919-1921); Marx–Engels–Lenin Institute of the CC CPSU (1952); Marx–Engels–Lenin–Stalin Institute of the CC CPSU (1953); Institute of Marxism–Leninism of the CC CPSU (1956-1991); Institute of the Theory and History of Socialism of the CC CPSU (1991)

The Marx–Engels–Lenin Institute (Russian: Институт Маркса — Энгельса — Ленина, Institut Marksa – Engelsa – Lenina), established in Moscow in 1919 as the Marx–Engels Institute (Russian: Институт К. Маркса и Ф. Энгельса, Institut K. Marksa i F. Engelsa), was a Soviet library and archive attached to the Communist Academy. The institute was later attached to the governing Central Committee of the Communist Party of the Soviet Union and served as a research center and publishing house for officially published works of Marxist thought. From 1956 to 1991, the institute was named the Institute of Marxism–Leninism (Russian: Институт марксизма-ленинизма, Institut Marksizma-Leninizma; IML, Russian: ИМЛ).

The Marx–Engels Institute gathered unpublished manuscripts by Karl Marx, Friedrich Engels, Vladimir Lenin and other leading Marxist theoreticians as well as collecting books, pamphlets and periodicals related to the socialist and organized labor movements. By 1930, the facility's holdings included more than 400,000 books and journals and more than 55,000 original and photocopy documents by Marx and Engels alone, making it one of the largest holdings of socialist-related material in the world.

In February 1931, director of the Marx–Engels Institute David Riazanov and others on the staff were purged for ideological reasons. In November of that same year, the Marx–Engels Institute was merged with the larger and less scholarly Lenin Institute (established in 1923) to form the Marx–Engels–Lenin Institute.

The institute was the coordinating authority for the systematic organization of documents released in the multi-volume editions of the Collected Works of Marx, Engels, Lenin, Stalin and numerous other official publications. It was officially terminated in November 1991, with the bulk of its archival holdings now residing with a successor organization, the Russian State Archive of Socio-Political History (RGASPI).

== History ==
=== Establishment ===
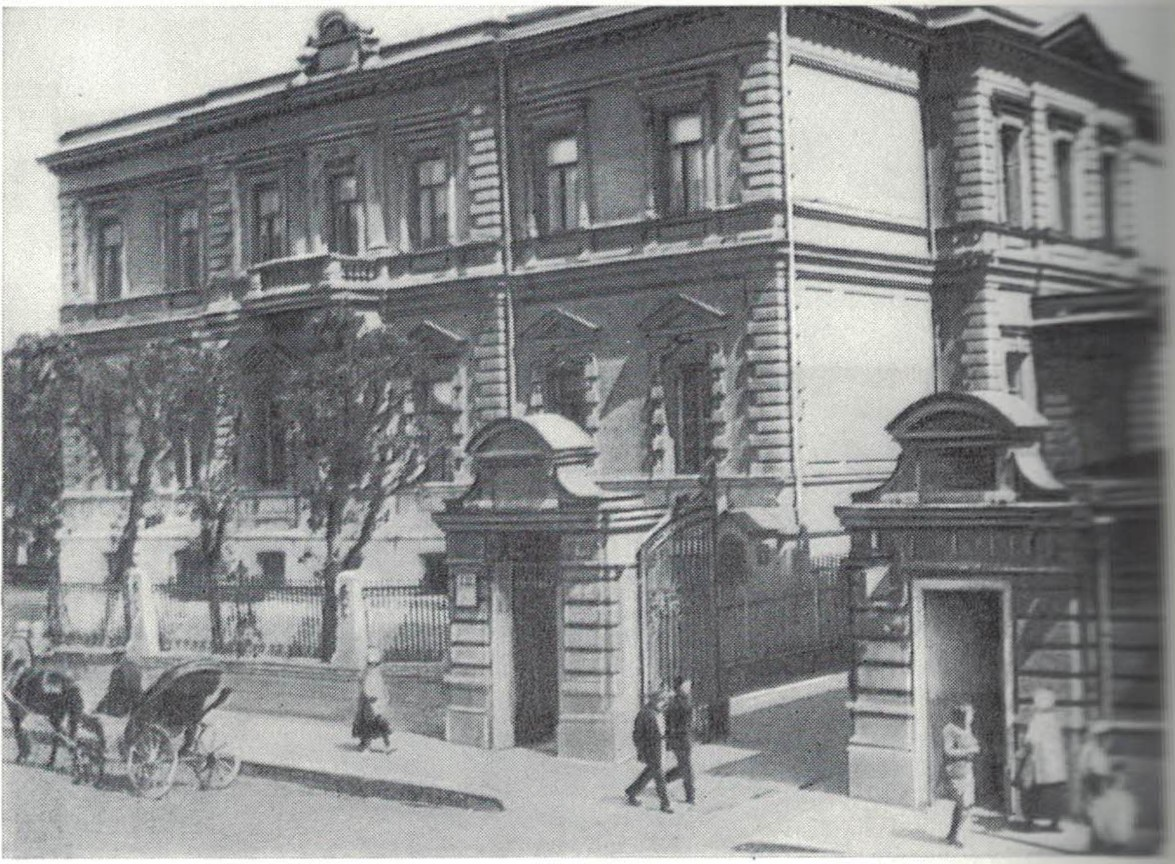
The first building of the Marx-Engels-Lenin Institute on Pushkinskaya Street, 1926

The Marx–Engels Institute was established in 1919 by the government of Soviet Russia as a branch of the Communist Academy, intended as an academic research facility to conduct historical studies and to collect documents deemed relevant to the new socialist regime. The first director of the facility, located in Moscow, was David Riazanov. On January 11, 1921, the Organizing Bureau of the Central Committee of the RCP (b) adopted a resolution on the establishment of the Marx–Engels Institute, which in 1922, became an independent institution under the All-Russian Central Executive Committee of the RSFSR (from April 1924—under Central Executive Committee of the USSR).

The institute assembled and maintained a research library devoted to socialist-related theme, amassing in a little over 10 years a collection of some 400,000 books, pamphlets, and journals, 15,000 manuscripts and 175,000 photocopies of original documents held elsewhere. Among these were 55,000 manuscripts by Karl Marx and Friedrich Engels alone—far and away the single most important accumulation of such material.

The institute included an academic staff which engaged in research on historical and topical themes of interest to the regime. The institute included sections devoted to the history of the First and Second Internationals, the history of Germany, the history of France, the history of Great Britain, the history of the United States, the history of the countries of Southern Europe and the history of international relations. Also included were sections working in philosophy, economics, political science and the history of socialism in Slavic countries.

The main research orientation of the facility was towards history rather than other social sciences. By 1930, of the 109 employed by the Marx–Engels Institute, fully 87 were historians. While working under the watchful eyes of the All-Union Communist Party (b), the Marx–Engels Institute was not a one-party affair in its formative decade, with just 39 of its staff members also members of the Communist Party in 1930.

During its first decade, the institute published an array of books by the likes of Georgi Plekhanov, Karl Kautsky, Franz Mehring, Georg Wilhelm Friedrich Hegel, David Ricardo and Adam Smith. The publication of the anticipated multi-volume works of Marx and Engels was started at this time (1927/28) in the form of two editions: an untranslated, complete edition (the first Marx-Engels-Gesamtausgabe), which was to comprise 42 volumes (12 of which were published by 1935 – when this project was discontinued), and a first Russian edition in 28 volumes (Sochineniya^{1}), the 33 bound books of which were completely published by 1947.

The institute also published two regular academic journals, Arkhiv Karla Marksa i Friderikha Engel'sa (Archive of Karl Marx and Frederick Engels) and Letopis' marksizma (Marxist Chronicle).

=== Lenin Institute ===
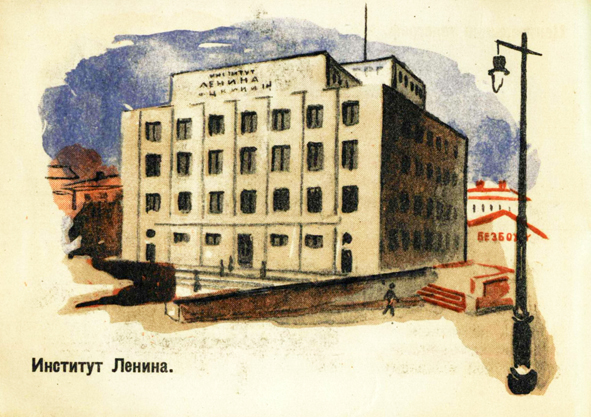
An illustration of the Institute from the book Красная столица (transl. Red Capital) by Lev Kuleshov, 1930

The Lenin Institute began as an independent archival project, established by the Central Committee of the Communist Party of the Soviet Union in 1923 to gather manuscripts with a view to publication of a scholarly edition of Vladimir Lenin's collected works. This work was accomplished through the publication of a thick periodical called Leninskii sbornik (Lenin Miscellany), some 25 numbers of which were published between 1924 and 1933. The institute eventually became under the jurisdiction of the Central Committee as a department.

The mission of the Lenin Institute was expanded in 1924 by the 13th Congress of the Russian Communist Party to include the "study and dissemination of Leninism among the broad masses within and outside the party", namely an enlarged purview which rendered obsolete the previously existing Commission on the History of the October Revolution and the History of the Communist Party (Istpart). In 1928, Istpart was dissolved and its functions fully absorbed by the Lenin Institute.

The Lenin Institute was a slightly larger entity than the Marx–Engels Institute, with a staff of 158 in 1929, but it did not share the reputation for impartial scholarship enjoyed by the older research library and scholarly think tank. The Lenin Institute was initially headed by Lev Kamenev, followed by Ivan Skvortsov-Stepanov and after his death in 1928 by Maximilian Saveliev.

=== 1931 restructuring ===
In February 1931 as part of the Menshevik Trial in February 1931, economist Isaak Rubin—a former employee of the Marx–Engels Institute—implicated the head of the institute David Riazanov as part of the conspiracy, with Riazanov accused of having hidden Menshevik documents in the facility. Although modern scholars consider the accusation in the February show trial to have been extremely dubious, Riazanov was nevertheless arrested and sent into exile outside of Moscow. A purge of Marx–Engels Institute staff deemed to be ideologically suspicious followed. In the wake of the ideological purges of the Marx–Engels Institute in November 1931, it was merged with the larger Lenin Institute to form the Marx–Engels–Lenin Institute under the direction of Vladimir Adoratsky.

=== Later name changes ===
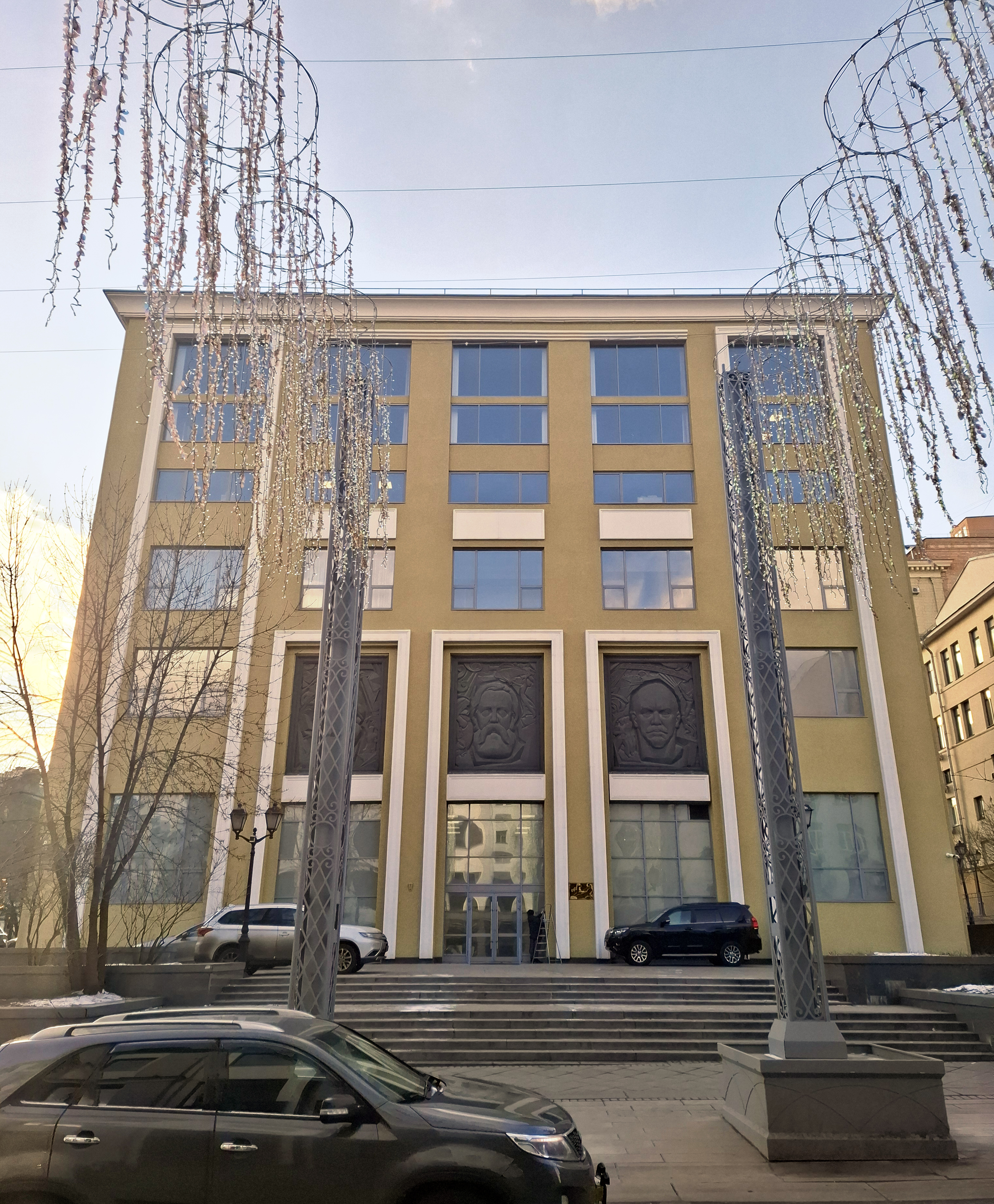
Entrance to the former Lenin Institute, which now houses the Russian State Archive of Socio-Political History

The Marx–Engels–Lenin Institute was subsequently renamed multiple times. In 1952, the facility's formal attachment to the Central Committee of the Communist Party of the Soviet Union was formally noted with the expanded moniker Marx–Engels–Lenin Institute of the CC CPSU (Russian: Институт Маркса—Энгельса—Ленина при ЦК КПСС). The name of deceased Soviet leader Joseph Stalin was added in 1953, with the institute formally becoming the Marx–Engels–Lenin–Stalin Institute of the CC CPSU.

This remained in place until the onset of de-Stalinization following the so-called Secret Speech of Nikita Khrushchev in 1956. At this point, the name changed to Institute of Marxism–Leninism of the CC CPSU (Russian: Институт марксизма-ленинизма при ЦК КПСС). During this period, beginning in the 1950s, the institute was involved in the realization of major projects such as the publication of a second Russian edition of the collected works of Marx and Engels (Sochineniya^{2} with 39 basic and 11 supplementary volumes) and the comprehensive fifth edition of Lenin's Collected Works (55 volumes). From the 1970s onwards, it also participated with foreign partners in the publication of the English-language Marx/Engels Collected Works (50 volumes) and the second Marx-Engels-Gesamtausgabe.

The name "Institute of Marxism–Leninism" remained unaltered for nearly 35 years until turmoil in the Soviet Union brought about a name change to Institute of the Theory and History of Socialism of the CC CPSU (Russian: Институт теории и истории социализма ЦК КПСС). The institute formally ceased to exist in November 1991 following the fall of the Soviet Union, with the institute's library and archive transferred to a new entity called the Russian Independent Institute for Social and National Problems.

The Central Party Archive of the institute was placed under the control of the Russian Ministry of Culture and eventually emerged as the Russian State Archive of Socio-Political History (RGASPI).

== Directors ==
- Vladimir Adoratsky (1931–1939)
- Mark Mitin (1939–1944)
- Vladimir Kruzhkov (1944–1949)
- Pyotr Pospelov (1949–1952, 1961–1967)
- Gennady Obichkin (1952–1961)
- Pyotr Fedoseyev (1967–1973)
- Anatoly Egorov (1974–1987)
- Georgy L. Smirnov (1987–1991)
- M. K. Gorshkov (1991, acting)

== See also ==
- Istpart
- Institute for Marxism-Leninism for the Central Committee of the SED
- Institute of Marxism-Leninism (India)
- Russian State Archive of Socio-Political History
