= Semyon Kanatchikov =

Soviet politician and writer

- Семён Канатчиков
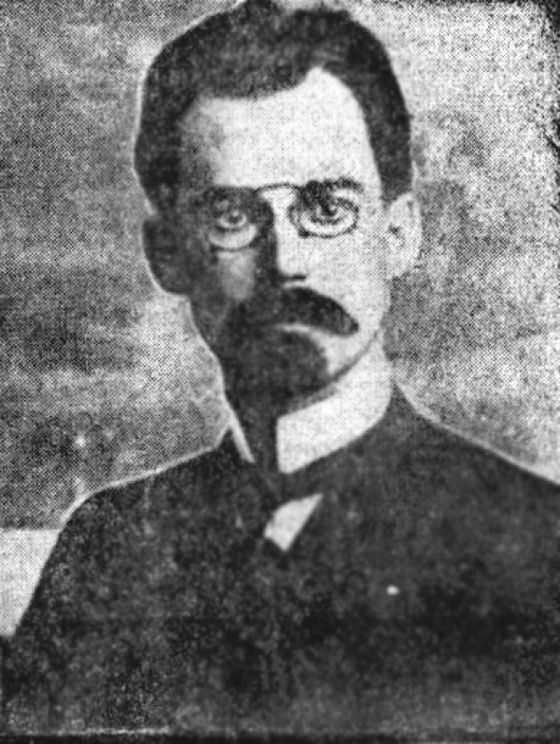
- Born: April 13, 1879; Gusevo, Moscow Governorate, Russian Empire
- Died: 1937-40 (aged 57-61); Unknown Gulag, Russian SFSR, Soviet Union
- Political party: CPSU (from 1912)
- Other political affiliations: RSDLP (‍–‍1912; Bolshevik faction from 1903)

Semyon Ivanovich Kanatchikov (13 April [O.S. 1 April] 1879 – 1937) was a Russian revolutionary, Soviet politician, journalist, literary critic, and writer.

== Biography ==
=== Early years ===
Kanatchikov was born in 1879 into a peasant family and became a worker from a young age, eventually becoming employed at the Gustav List Metal Works in Moscow. He was a member of the League of Struggle for the Emancipation of the Working Class and joined the Russian Social Democratic Labour Party (RSDLP) after its founding. From 1903, he was a member of its Bolshevik faction.

In 1905 he was a member of the Moscow, then Petrograd party committees. Then he worked in Yekaterinburg and Nizhny Tagil.

As a Bolshevik delegate with a decisive vote from the Ural organization of the 4th (Unification) Congress of the RSDLP (1906), he represented the Nizhny Tagil organization. Listed as Egorov in the minutes of the congress, and supported Vladimir Lenin and his platform. From 1910 to 1916 he was in prison and exile in the Irkutsk Province.

=== Revolutionary career ===
In 1917 he was a member of the Novonikolaevsky and Tomsk committees of the Communist Party of the Soviet Union (CPSU) and a member of the Novonikolaev Council. In 1918, he served as Chairman of the Tomsk Military Revolutionary Headquarters, Deputy Chairman of the Provincial Executive Committee, then a member of the Perm Provincial Executive Committee and head of the Provincial Department of Public Education.

From 1919 he worked in Moscow. He was member of the Board of the People's Commissariat of Internal Affairs (NKVD), a member of the Small Council of People's Commissars, and one of the organizers of the Sverdlov Communist University.

He served Deputy Chairman of the Council of People's Commissars of the Tatar ASSR in 1920–1921.

=== Political and academic career ===
From 1921 to 1924 he was the rector of the Zinoviev Communist University in Petrograd. In 1925 he headed the State Institute of Journalism (GIJ).

In 1924 he was the head of the press department of the Central Committee of the CPSU and in 1925-1926 he was the head of the Istpart department of the Central Committee of the All-Union Communist Party (b). In 1926-1928 he was a TASS correspondent in Czechoslovakia. He published his memoirs, A Radical Worker in Tsarist Russia: The Autobiography of Semen Ivanovich Kanatchikov, in the 1920s.

A supporter of Grigory Zinoviev, from 1925 to 1927, Kanatchikov was a member of the Leningrad and the United Opposition. He then broke with the opposition and engaged in self criticism.

He was a professor of the Faculty of Soviet Law at Moscow State University (1925–1926) where he taught a course on the history of the party.

From 1928 he engaged in literary work. Kanatchikov served as an editor of the Krasnaya Nov magazine, and editor of the Proletarian Revolution journal, in 1929–1930, the responsible (chief) editor of the Literaturnaya Gazeta, and then editor-in-chief of GIHL.

=== Arrest, death and rehabilitation ===
Kanatchikov was arrested by the NKVD in 1936 and sentenced to eight years in work camps. In April 1938 he was included in the list of persons whose works were subject to unconditional withdrawal from libraries.

Kanatchikov died in a Gulag, between 1937 and 1940. According to one source he died on October 19, 1940. According to other sources, he was shot in 1937.
