= Matvei Muranov =

Soviet politician (1873–1959)

- Матвей Муранов
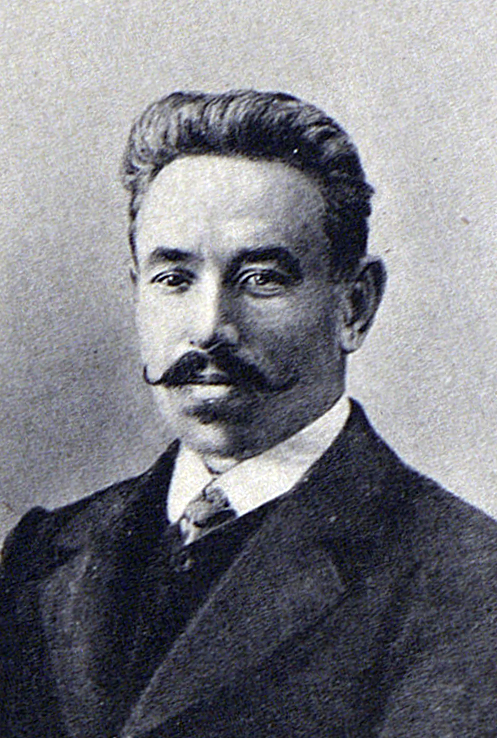
- Muranov in 1912

Member of the 4th State Duma of the Russian Empire
- In office 15 November 1912 – 6 October 1917
- Constituency: Kharkov Governorate

Member of the 6th Secretariat
- In office 6 August 1917 – 8 March 1918

Candidate member of the 8th Orgburo
- In office 8 March 1919 – 5 April 1920

Personal details
- Born: Matvei Konstantinovich Muranov; 11 December 1873 Rybtsy, Poltava Governorate, Russian Empire
- Died: 9 December 1959 (aged 85) Moscow, Russian SFSR, Soviet Union
- Party: Russian Communist Party (1918–1939)
- Other political affiliations: RSDLP (Bolsheviks) (1904–1918)
- Awards: Order of Lenin (×2)

Matvei Konstantinovich Muranov (Russian: Матвей Константинович Муранов; 11 December [O.S. 29 November] 1873 – 9 December 1959) was a Ukrainian Bolshevik revolutionary, Soviet politician and statesman.

== Revolutionary beginnings ==
Born in a peasant family in Rybtsy (now part of Poltava in Ukraine), Muranov moved to Kharkiv in 1900 and worked as a railroad worker. He joined the Bolshevik faction of the Russian Social Democratic Labor Party (RSDLP) in 1904 and became a member of the local party committee in 1907. In 1912 Muranov was elected to the 4th State Duma from the city of Kharkiv and became one of 6 Bolshevik deputies there. Muranov was the only Bolshevik deputy (the other one, Roman Malinovsky, was later exposed as a secret police agent) who voted to break away from the rival Menshevik faction of the RSDLP on 15 December 1912.

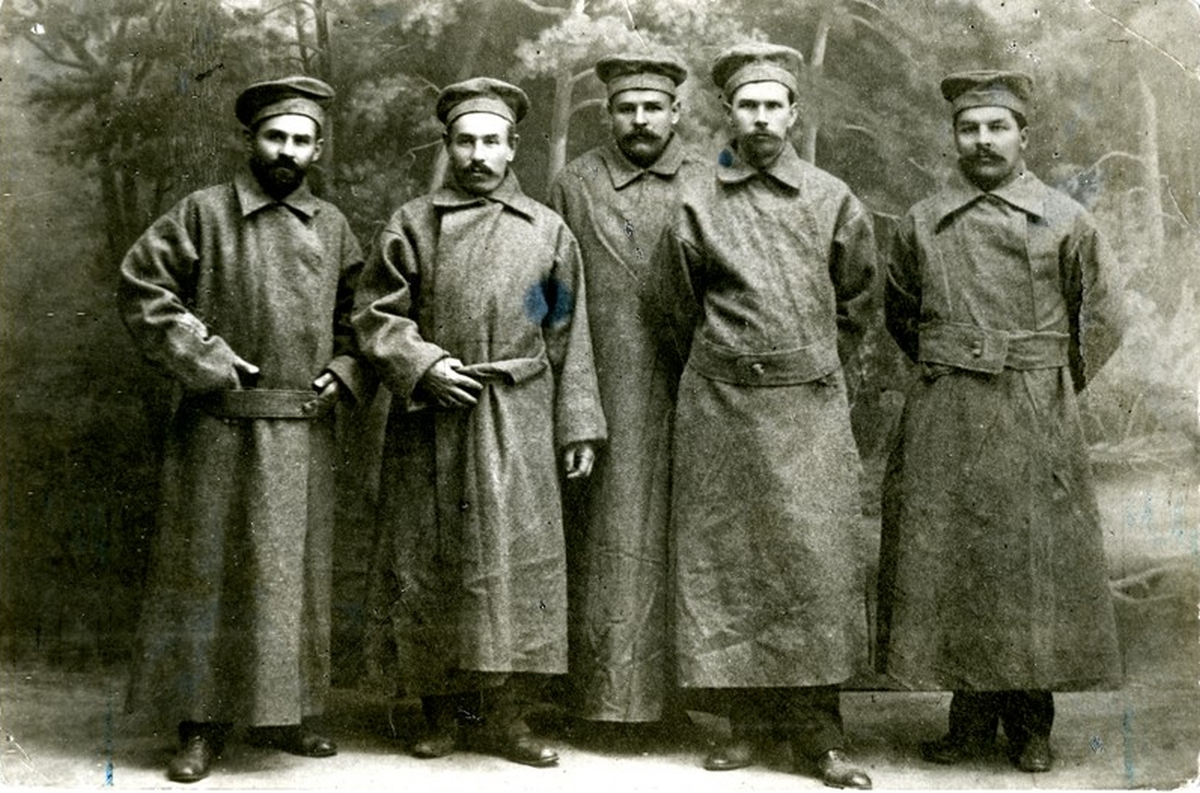
Bolshevik deputies of the Fourth State Duma released from a convict prison in convict clothes. From left to right: G. I. Petrovsky, M. K. Muranov, A. E. Badaev, F. N. Samoilov, N. R. Shagov. 1915

After the outbreak of World War I in August 1914, Muranov and other Bolshevik deputies followed the lead of the exiled Bolshevik leader Vladimir Lenin, denouncing the war and calling on Russian soldiers to turn their weapons against their own government. Bolshevik deputies traveled around the country using their parliamentary immunity to foster revolutionary activities. They were arrested in November 1914, expelled from the Duma and put on trial on 10 February 1915 on charges of high treason.

Facing the death penalty, some Bolshevik deputies and Lev Kamenev, who had been sent to Russia to direct their work in January 1914, wavered and moderated their position. Muranov, however, took an uncompromising approach, which enhanced his reputation within the Bolshevik party. In the end, the Tsarist government dropped most of the charges against the accused, who were skillfully defended by the future head of the Russian Provisional Government Alexander Kerensky and other lawyers. Muranov and other Duma deputies were exiled to the remote Turukhansk region of Siberia for life.

== The 1917 Revolution ==
After the overthrow of the Romanov dynasty by the February Revolution of 1917, Muranov returned to the capital, Petrograd, with other Bolshevik exiles including Lev Kamenev and Joseph Stalin. On 12 March, he joined the Russian Bureau of the Bolshevik Central Committee and on 16 March he joined the editorial board of the Bolshevik newspaper Pravda. Muranov and Stalin were also made members of the Executive Committee of the Petrograd Soviet.

Muranov used his political capital within the Bolshevik party, which he had earned with his behavior at the 1915 trial, to provide political cover for Kamenev, whose behavior at the trial had made him suspect in the eyes of rank and file Bolsheviks. Together, they took over Pravda and ousted its previous editors, Vyacheslav Molotov and Alexander Shlyapnikov. Once in control, they advocated conditional support of the newly formed liberal Russian Provisional Government "insofar as it struggles against reaction or counter-revolution". Kamenev, Stalin and Muranov also suggested that Bolsheviks should unite with the internationalist wing of the rival Menshevik faction of the RSDLP. These positions were adopted by the All-Russian Conference of the Bolshevik Party on 28 March – 4 April 1917.

When Lenin and Grigory Zinoviev returned to Russia on 3 April, they opposed the Kamenev–Stalin–Muranov line and called for a socialist revolution and a complete break with the Mensheviks instead. Once Lenin emerged victorious at the next All-Russian Bolshevik conference in late April 1917, Muranov was sent back to Kharkov to run the local Bolshevik newspaper, Proletarian.

At the 6th Bolshevik Party Congress in late July and early August 1917, Muranov was elected to the party's Central Committee and became a member of its Secretariat. On 5 August, the Central Committee elected Muranov to its permanent bureau (uzkij sostav).

== Political life ==
Muranov participated in the Bolshevik seizure of power during the October Revolution of 1917 and was elected to the Bolshevik-dominated Presidium of the All-Russian Central Executive Committee at the Second Congress of Soviets. On 27 October, he became a member of the joint Bolshevik-Left Socialist-Revolutionary commission charged with preparing the Second Congress of Peasant Soviets in circumvention of the existing Central Executive Committee of Peasant Soviets. Muranov was a Bolshevik candidate in the 1917 Russian Constituent Assembly election, being fielded in the Arkhangelsk constituency. As a member of the Bolshevik Central Committee, he supported Lenin during the intra-party debate over the Treaty of Brest-Litovsk in early 1918.

Muranov was not re-elected to the Central Committee at the 7th Bolshevik Party Congress in March 1918, but returned to the body after the 8th Congress in March 1919. He remained a member of the Central Committee until 1923. Between March 1919 and April 1920, he was a candidate member of the Central Committee's Orgburo.

During the intra-party struggles of the 1920s, Muranov was an ally of Joseph Stalin. At the 11th Party Congress in 1922 he was elected to the Central Control Commission, a member of which he remained until 1934. In 1923–1934 he was also a member of the Soviet Supreme Court. In 1934 he moved to the All-Russian Central Executive Committee.

Muranov survived the Great Purge, which claimed the lives of many Old Bolsheviks, and was sent into retirement in 1939. He died in Moscow aged 86 and was buried at the Novodevichy Cemetery.

== Other references ==
- Encyclopedia of Marxism entry
