= Arkhangelsk electoral district =

Constituency of the Russian Republic

Arkhangelsk
- Former Civilian constituency for the All-Russian Constituent Assembly
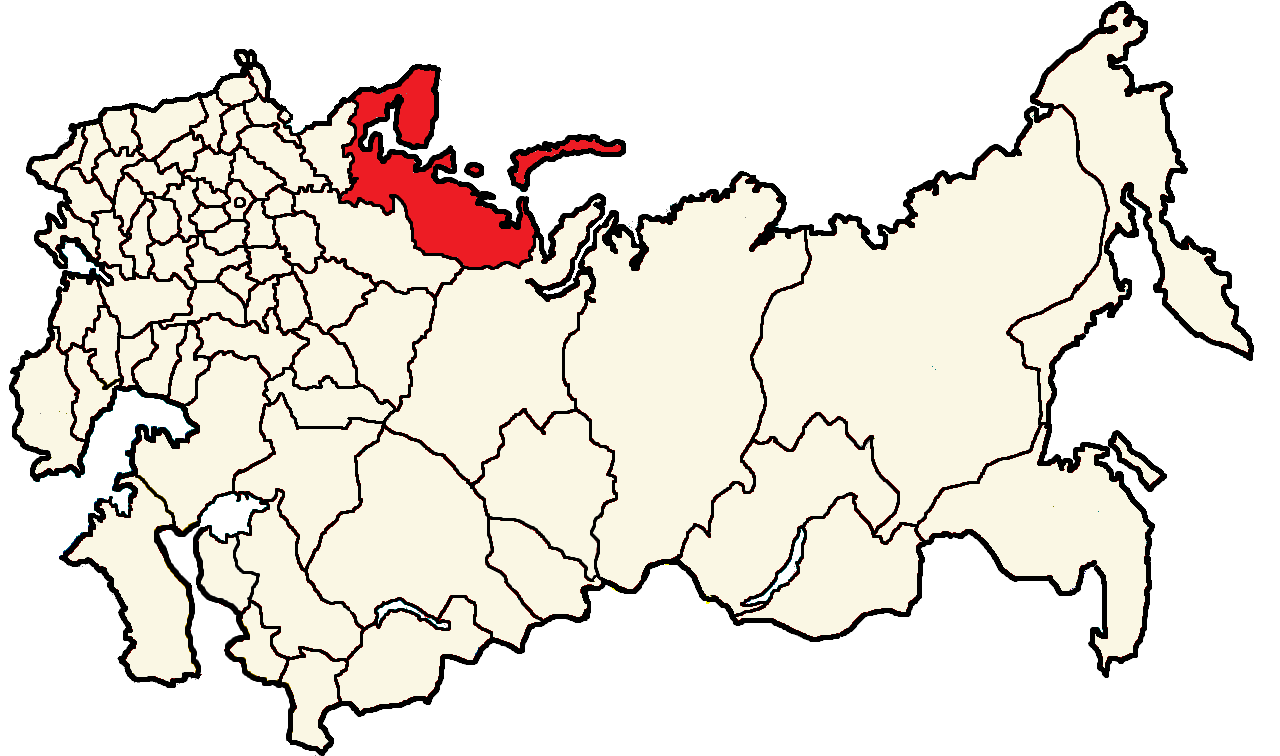

Former constituency
- Created: 1917
- Abolished: 1918
- Number of members: 2
- Number of Uyezd Electoral Commissions: 9
- Number of Urban Electoral Commissions: 1
- Number of Parishes: 126

Arkhangelsk electoral district (Russian: Архангельский избирательный округ) was a constituency created for the 1917 Russian Constituent Assembly election. The electoral district covered the Arkhangelsk Governorate.

Notably, Arkhangelsk had a different electoral system than the rest of the country, as voters voted for individual candidates rather than party lists. Five parties had fielded their candidates in the constituency; The Kadets fielded Aleksander Isupov and Viktor Bartenev, the Socialist-Revolutionaries (supported by the Peasants' Deputies Soviet) fielded Alexey Ivanov and Mikhail Kvyatkovsky, the Bolsheviks fielded Matvei Muranov and Georgy Oppokov and the Mensheviks fielded Anatoli Zhidkov and Vladimir Bustrem. Pavel Osipov was nominated by a group of citizens from Kurlev volost in Kholmogory uezd.

The election was held in the Arkhangelsk electoral district on November 27–29, 1917.

== Candidates ==
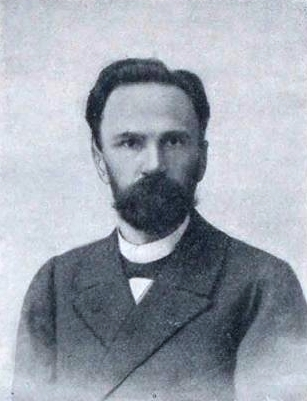
Aleksander Isupov, Kadet candidate

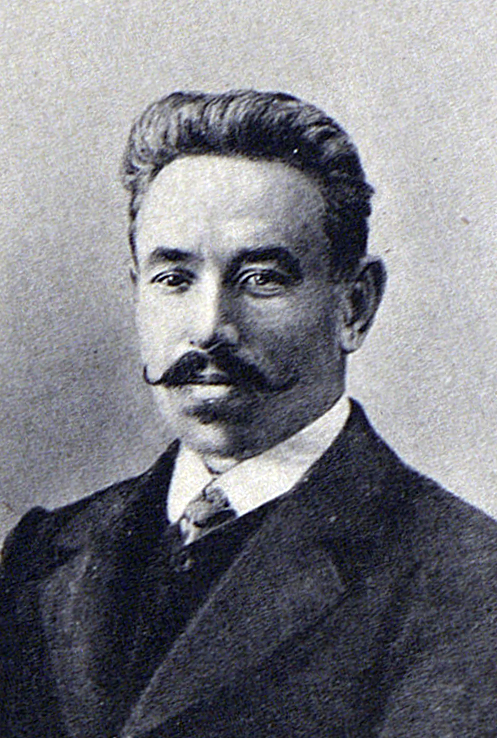
Matvei Muranov, Bolshevik candidate

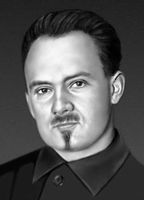
Georgy Oppokov, Bolshevik candidate

== Results ==
Arkhangelsk
Party	Vote	%	Seats	%
List 3 - Socialist-Revolutionaries and Soviet of Peasants' Deputies	85,272	66.81	2	100.00
List 5 - Bolsheviks	21,779	17.06		
List 1 - Kadets	12,086	9.47		
List 2 - Mensheviks	7,335	5.75		
List 3 - Citizens Group of Kurlev volost	1,160	0.91		
Total:	127,632		2	

Deputies Elected
Ivanov	SR
Kvyatkovskiy	SR

The account of U.S. historian Oliver Henry Radkey (shown in the table above) is missing the votes from 4 uezds, representing some 25% of the electorate the Arkhangelsk electoral district. The account of Soviet historian L. M. Spirin differs somewhat from the account presented by Radkey; Spirin assigns 106,570 votes for the SRs, 36,522 votes for the Bolsheviks, includes 5,032 "unaccounted votes" but his figures for the remaining 3 parties are identical with Radkey's totals. In Arkhangelsk town, according to Spirin, the Bolsheviks obtained 5,776 votes (29.7%), the Kadets 5,619 votes (28.9%), the SRs 5,238 votes (26.9%), the Mensheviks 2,765 votes (14.2%) and the Kurlev's Citizens Group 61 votes (0.3%).
