= Maximilian Saveliev =

Soviet academic and journalist (1884–1939)

Maximilian Alexandrovich Saveliev (Russian: Максимилиа́н Алекса́ндрович Саве́льев; February 19, 1884, Nizhny Novgorod – May 15, 1939, Moscow) was a Russian Bolshevik, Soviet academic, economist, journalist and historian.

== Life and career ==
He was born in to the family of Alexander Aleksandrovich Saveliev, a nobleman and leader of the zemstvo in Nizhny Novgorod who was a deputy of the Imperial State Duma for the Cadet Party. He was named Maximilian after the French revolutionary Maximilien Robespierre.

He studied at the Faculty of Law of the Imperial Moscow University but was expelled from the university after three semesters for his revolutionary activities. In 1903 Saveliev joined the Bolshevik faction of the Russian Social Democratic Labour Party. Being very secretive with his revolutionary activities he worked under the pseudonyms Vetrov, Nikita, Valerian and Petrov which resulted in many party members assuming he was more than one person.

In 1903, he was arrested but was soon released. He participated in the 1905 Revolution in Moscow and Saint Petersburg. In 1906, he was once again arrested and released in 1907 and then immigrated to Germany and became a member of the Social Democratic Party of Germany. In 1909, he took courses in economics at the Ludwig-Maximilians-Universität München however did not graduate. In 1911, he graduated from the Leipzig University with a doctorate of philosophy.

In 1911, Saveliev returned to Russia and became editor of the Bolshevik newspaper "Enlightenment" and became a member of the editorial board of the newspaper Rabochy Put. He was arrested twice during this period but continued his underground political activities.

From March 1917, he was an agent of the Central Committee of the RSDLP (b) in Kiev, a member of the Kiev Committee of the RSDLP (B), and secretary of the Kiev Soviet of Workers' Deputies. After the October Revolution he became a member of the editorial board of the newspaper Ekonomicheskaya Zhizn. Saveliev opposed the Brest-Litovsk Treaty and was associated with Left Communists of the Party.

In 1920, he was secretary of the Turkestan Regional Committee of the Russian Communist Party (b). From 1921 to 1922, he was a member of the presidium and head of the editorial and publishing department of the Supreme Soviet of the National Economy and editor of its magazine.

From 1921 to 1926, he was deputy head of the Istpart of the Central Committee in 1926 he was editor of the journal Proletarian Revolution. From 1927, he was head of the Istpart and after its merger with the Lenin Institute he Saveliev became director of the Lenin Institute.

From July 21, 1929, to July 25, 1930, he was the editor-in-chief of the Izvestia newspaper. During his period of editorship, he ideologically guided the newspaper and wrote many articles in defense of the new repressions against the kulak class, leaders of the opposition in the party Leon Trotsky, Grigoriy Zinoviev, Lev Kamenev and others as well as repressions against religion. In one of the leading articles, Saveliev argued that the Pope and the Bishop of Canterbury, defending the enemies-priests, were calling on the peoples of the world to a "crusade against the USSR." In October 1929, approving the instruction to remove the church bells, Izvestia wrote: "The bell ringing violates the right of the broad atheistic masses of cities and villages to a well-deserved rest."

In late 1930, he was the chief editor of Pravda.

From March 1932, he was a member of the Academy of Sciences of the Soviet Union and the Academy of Sciences of the Ukrainian SSR. In 1931, he was deputy, and from 1932 he was appointed Chairman of the Presidium of the Communist Academy.

From 1936 to 1938, Saveliev was director of the Institute of Economics of the Academy of Sciences and from 1936 until his death he was the deputy director of the Marx-Engels-Lenin Institute.

Maximilian Saveliev died in Moscow on May 15, 1939, aged 55 and is buried beside his wife in the Novodevichy Cemetery.

== Works ==
The main subjects to which his works were devoted are the theory of Marxism–Leninism, the history of the Party and the October Revolution, and the economy of the Soviet Union.

Saveliev's most famous works are "Ленин и Октябрьское вооруженное восстание" (Lenin and the October Armed Uprising) (1927) and "Возникновение большевизма" (The Emergence of Bolshevism) (1933).
