= Vladimir Nevsky =

Russian revolutionary and historian (1876–1937)

- Владимир Невский
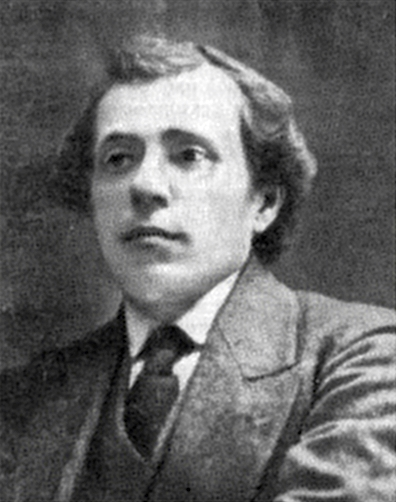

People's Commissar of Transport of the RSFSR
- In office 25 June 1918 – 17 March 1919
- Preceded by: Pyotr Kobozev
- Succeeded by: Leonid Krasin

Personal details
- Born: 2 May [O.S. 14 May] 1876 Rostov-on-Don, Russian Empire
- Died: May 26, 1937 (aged 61) Moscow, RSFSR
- Resting place: Donskoye Cemetery
- Citizenship: Soviet
- Party: CPSU
- Education: Kharkov University
- Occupation: Historian, politician

Vladimir Ivanovich Nevsky (Russian: Влади́мир Ива́нович Не́вский; 14 May [O.S. 2 May] 1876 – 26 May 1937) was a Russian revolutionary, Bolshevik functionary, Soviet statesman, professor and historian.

== Early career ==
Nevsky was born Feodosii Ivanovich Krivobokov to a wealthy family of Old Believers in Rostov-on-Don. His father was a merchant, and his grandparents were Cossacks. He became involved in a political circle in 1895, and organised an illegal Social Democratic group in 1897. He joined the Russian Social Democratic Labour Party in 1898, as a student at Moscow University, shortly after the party was founded. He was expelled from university in 1899 for his revolutionary activities and sent back to Rostov under police supervision. He returned to Moscow, but was arrested again in 1901, held in prison for eight months, then exiled to Voronezh, where he helped set up a distribution network for Iskra, the newspaper founded abroad by Vladimir Lenin and others. He joined the Bolsheviks when the RSDLP split into factions in 1903.

Nevsky moved to Geneva in 1904 at a time when Lenin was losing control of the Bolshevik faction to 'conciliators' who wanted to reunite with the Mensheviks, but Nevsky backed Lenin and was sent to St Petersburg to organise the Bolshevik faction. He admitted, years later, that the St Petersburg Bolshevik committee was so engrossed in the dispute with the Mensheviks that they did not know about the strikes that marked the beginning of the 1905 revolution until they read about them in foreign newspapers. He helped prepare the party Congress that Lenin convened in London in April 1905. According to some reports, he was a delegate to the conference, representing the Caucasus, which would imply that he was in Baku for part of 1904 or 1905, but that is disputed. In 1906–08, he was a member of the executive of the St Petersburg Bolshevik committee. Arrested in 1908, he was released in 1909. He graduated from the University of Kharkiv in 1910. Sent as a delegate to the Bolshevik conference which Lenin convened in Prague in 1912, he was arrested on the way, but later was co-opted onto the Central Committee.

== Career from 1917 ==
At the time of the February Revolution in 1917, Nevsky was in exile in Yekaterinburg, but he moved to Petrograd (St Petersburg) where, as a member of the military organisation of the Bolshevik party, he became known as the "idol of the soldiers" because of his popularity with troops based in the capital. At the start of the disturbances known as the July Days, when it was not official party policy to attempt to overthrow the Provisional Government, Nevsky addressed a machine gun regiment who were thinking of mutinying to avoid being sent to the front to fight the Germans. He later admitted: "I gave my advice in such a way that only a fool could conclude from my speech that the demonstration should not take place." After the government regained control, Nevsky went into hiding to avoid arrest.

During the October Revolution, he was responsible for seizing control of Petrograd's railway network. Afterwards, he organised a conference of railway workers, to secure control of the railways nationwide. He was appointed Deputy People's Commissar (Minister) for Railways in February 1918, and was People's Commissar, July 1918-March 1919. In 1919–20, he headed the Central Committee department for work in the countryside.

From 1920, after the end of the Russian Civil War, Nevsky specialised in academic and educational work, and established himself as the leading historian of the Bolshevik party. Nevsky was the founding rector of the Sverdlov Communist University, 1919–21, but was sacked because of his involvement with the Workers' Opposition, and posted to the Caucasus. In December 1920, he was appointed head of the scientific sector of the People's Commissariat for Education. In 1922, he was appointed head of the Petrograd branch of Istpart, the Commission on the History of the October Revolution and the Russian Communist Party., but was recalled to Moscow later in the year and commissioned to write a history of the party, and appointed deputy head of Istpart.

In 1923, when Lenin was terminally ill and Joseph Stalin was emerging as the strong man in the party leadership, Nevsky was accused of being secretly linked to the opposition, and was removed from his position in Istpart. In January 1924, the head of Istpart, Mikhail Olminsky refused to publish an article Nevsky had written on events in Baku in 1904. This is likely to have been because he either failed to mention Stalin, or did not attribute a leading role to him. When the first volume of Nevsky's essays on party history appeared, in March 1924, Olminsky publicly objected to its having Istpart's imprint on it. He also objected when Nevsky proposed to include articles and memoirs by Mensheviks when covering the history of the 1905 revolution.

In February 1925 Nevsky was appointed director of the V.I Lenin Library (now Russian State Library), a position he held for over a decade. In the same year, Nevsky publicly renounced the opposition, which was now led by Leon Trotsky. His last published article, entitled "The Brilliant Leader" appeared in Pravda on 22 January 1935. It was a tribute to Lenin, with no mention of Stalin.

== Arrest and death ==
Nevsky was arrested on February 20, 1935. It was at a time when the history of the founding of the Bolshevik organisation in Baku and Georgia was being rewritten to create a false narrative that glorified the part played by Joseph Stalin. Nevsky, like Avel Yenukidze, was a target because of the history he had written of the period, which did not mention Stalin. He was sentenced to five years in a labour camp.

During the Great Purge Nevsky was brought back to Moscow, held in Butyrka prison and accused of – among other crimes – having "tried to blur and hush up the great role of comrade Stalin as a brilliant successor to the great cause of Lenin." According to fellow prisoners, he never renounced his Bolshevik views and gave lectures for inmates on the history of the party and the October Revolution. His name was on a death list signed by Stalin and three others on May 15, 1937. On May 25 he was sentenced by the Military Collegium of the Supreme Court of the Soviet Union to be shot. The sentence was carried out the next day.

Vladimir Nevsky was posthumously rehabilitated in 1955.
