= Konstantin Zharnovetsky =

Russian Bolshevik (1881–1941)

Konstantin Sigismundovich Zharnovetsky (Russian: Константин Сигизмундович Жарновецкий, 1881, Yerevan – 1941, Leningrad) was a Russian Bolshevik, a commissar of the Peterhof Military Revolutionary Committee, the head of the Red Army in the city of Narva, a professor heading the faculty of social studies at Leningrad University.

== Biography ==
Zharnovetsky was born in Erivan (modern Yerevan, Armenia) into a family of white-collar workers. In 1900, after graduating from the high school, he came to St. Petersburg and entered the historical-philological faculty of St. Petersburg State University, and graduated in 1904.

Since 1900, he was a member of the Petersburg Committee of the Russian Social Democratic Labour Party (of Bolsheviks). On March 15, 1904, he joined the Bolshevik Party; in 1905, he was a member of the Petersburg Committee of the RSDLP(b). Since 1906, Zharnovetsky was in the city committee of the Military Organization of the Bolsheviks. During 1906–1910, he was repeatedly arrested and banished from St. Petersburg; since 1910, he settled in Peterhof and taught the history of Russian literature in the gymnasium for boys named after Emperor Alexander II.

After February 1917, he was one of institutors of the Peterhof Council and the Party Committee of Bolsheviks. He also actively propagandized the ideas among soldiers. In July, 1917, he was arrested under the order of the Interim Government, but he was released due to the pressure of military committees. From October 1917, he became the Commissioner of the Peterhof Military Revolutionary Committee, he also participated in the battles against the General Krasnov in Krasnoye Selo. Subsequently, he worked in Narva as the municipal chief of the Red Guards and the editor of “Narva news”. After the Brest peace, he returned to Petrograd and was appointed as the head of agitation and propaganda department of the gubernial Party Committee.

In 1918, as the Commissioner and a member of the Revolutionary Military Council of the ninth Army, he took part in the battles against the armies of General Nikolai Yudenich. After the Civil War, he taught the social sciences in different higher educational establishments in Leningrad. Since 1931, he became a professor heading the faculty of social sciences in the Leningrad University. He died during the siege of Leningrad.
