= Institute of Marxism-Leninism (India) =

Institute of Marxism-Leninism was an association formed amongst radical elements within the Communist Party of India in West Bengal. It was founded on 22 April 1964. Leading figures were Sushital Roy Chowdhury, Asit Sen and Saroj Dutta (who joined the Institute at a later stage).

The Institute ran a small study centre and a library. The Institute published a Bengali language organ, Bulletin. It also published some books. It brought out a collection in two volumes of selected writings of Karl Marx, Friedrich Engels, Vladimir Lenin, Joseph Stalin and Mao Zedong, called Marks-Leniner Patakatale. It also published a book by Sushital Roy Chowdhury, Antorjatik Shramik Andolaner Itihas: Ruparekha.

== See also ==
- Communist Party of India (Marxist–Leninist)
