= Mikhail Olminsky =

Russian Bolshevik (1863–1933)

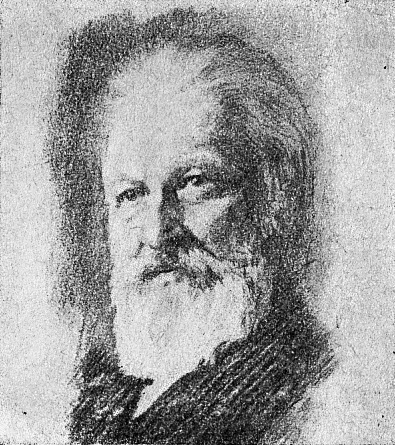
Mikhail Stepanovich Olminsky

Mikhail Stepanovich Olminsky (Russian: Михаил Степанович Ольминский; 15 October, [O.S. 3 October] 1863 – May 8, 1933) (real surname: Aleksandrov) was a prominent Russian Bolshevik particularly involved with Party history and also an active literary scholar and publicist.

Olminsky was born in Voronezh to the family of a minor state official and noble. He joined Narodnaya Volya as a student at St Petersburg University and was arrested in 1885 and exiled to Voronezh. In 1893, he was involved in spreading revolutionary propaganda among workers in St Petersburg, for which he was arrested and spent about five years in solitary confinement. He joined the Russian Social Democratic Labour Party (RSDLP) when it was founded, in 1898. In 1904, he emigrated to Switzerland, where he joined the Bolsheviks, and supported Lenin against the conciliators who wanted to reunite the Bolshevik and Menshevik factions of the RSDLP. He took part in a conference of 22 Bolsheviks held in Geneva in summer 1904 which agreed the letter To the party which paved the way for the Bolshevik-Menshevik split. He was then appointed one of five editors of Vpered, the first exclusively Bolshevik newspaper, published in Switzerland.

Olminskye returned to St Petersburg during the 1905 Revolution and worked on the editorial board of several Bolshevik newspapers, including Novaya Zhizn. In 1907–08, he was based in Baku, but returned to St Petersburg in 1909. In 1912, he was one of the founders of Pravda. In 1915, in Saratov, he edited the only legal Bolshevik newspaper, Нашей газеты. In 1916, he moved to Moscow, where he was co-opted onto the regional bureau of the RSDLP, and edited the trade union newspaper, Голос печатного труда. He was also a contributor to the magazine Letopis which was published between 1915 and 1917.

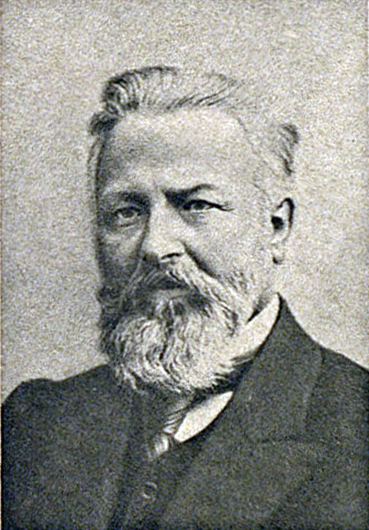
Olminsky in 1917

After the February Revolution, Olminsky was based in Moscow, where he played a part in taking control of the city during the October Revolution. In 1918, he joined the editorial board of Pravda and was appointed a professor at the Communist Academy, and served on the apparatus Central Committee of the Russian Communist Party (Bolsheviks) from March 1921 to December 1924 with particular responsibility for the Party History Department serving as the head of the Istpart (Commission on the History of the October Revolution and the Russian Communist Party (Bolsheviks)). He was the first editor of Proletarian Revolution.

He was an early specialist in the history of the Bolshevik organisation, who did a great deal of work collecting and publishing the writings of Lenin, and Georgi Plekhanov, and other documents and memoirs. But in The Real Situation in Russia (1928) Leon Trotsky described Olminsky as a "Stalinist falsifier" claiming that he had in 1921 been very appreciative of Trotsky's book 1905, even if he subsequently claimed to have always opposed Trotsky. He repeated the charge in his book, The Stalin School of Falsification, in which he reproduced a letter from Olminsky, written in 1921 saying that Istpart would be "delighted" to publish 1905, and proposing that his entire works should be collected and published. Trotsky asked, sarcastically, "Was Olminsky perhaps a "Trotskyist"in 1921?"

In 1922, Olminsky founded the All-Union Society of Old Bolsheviks and was its chairman until 1931. He was buried in the Red Square near the Kremlin Wall Necropolis.
