= Vperyod =

Bolshevik newspaper

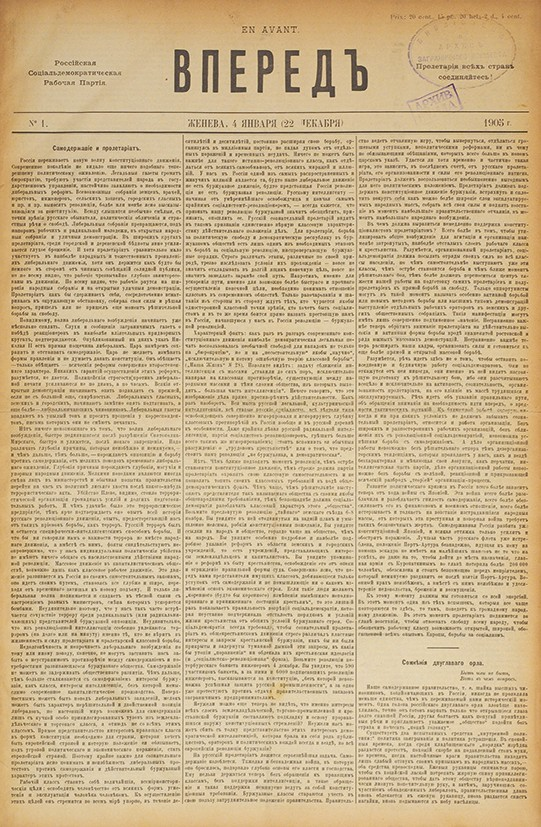
- First page of the first issue
- Founder: Vladimir Lenin
- Founded: 22 December 1904
- Ceased publication: 1905
- Language: Russian
- City: Geneva
- Country: Switzerland

Vperyod (Russian: Вперёд; transl. Forward) was the first factional newspaper of the Bolsheviks after the split at the Second Congress of the Russian Social Democratic Labour Party. The first issue of the paper was published on 22 December 1904 in Geneva.

The newspaper was founded personally by Vladimir Lenin and starting from January 4, 1905, the newspaper began to be published. As Lenin himself wrote - "The direction of the newspaper Vperyod is the direction of the old Iskra. " The newspaper Vperyod's policy aimed at a complete split with the Mensheviks rallied the party committees on the basis of Leninist principles and ensured the convocation of the Third Congress of the RSDLP. Among its editors were Vatslav Vorovsky, Mikhail Olminsky, Anatoly Lunacharsky and Ivan Teodorowich.

At that same period, the Caucasian Union Committee of the RSDLP, headed by Josif Stalin, created a literary group to support the newspaper, however 4 months after publication, the newspaper was liquidated.
