= Turukhansk =

Village in Krasnoyarsk Krai, Russia

Turukhansk Туруханск
- (a selo)
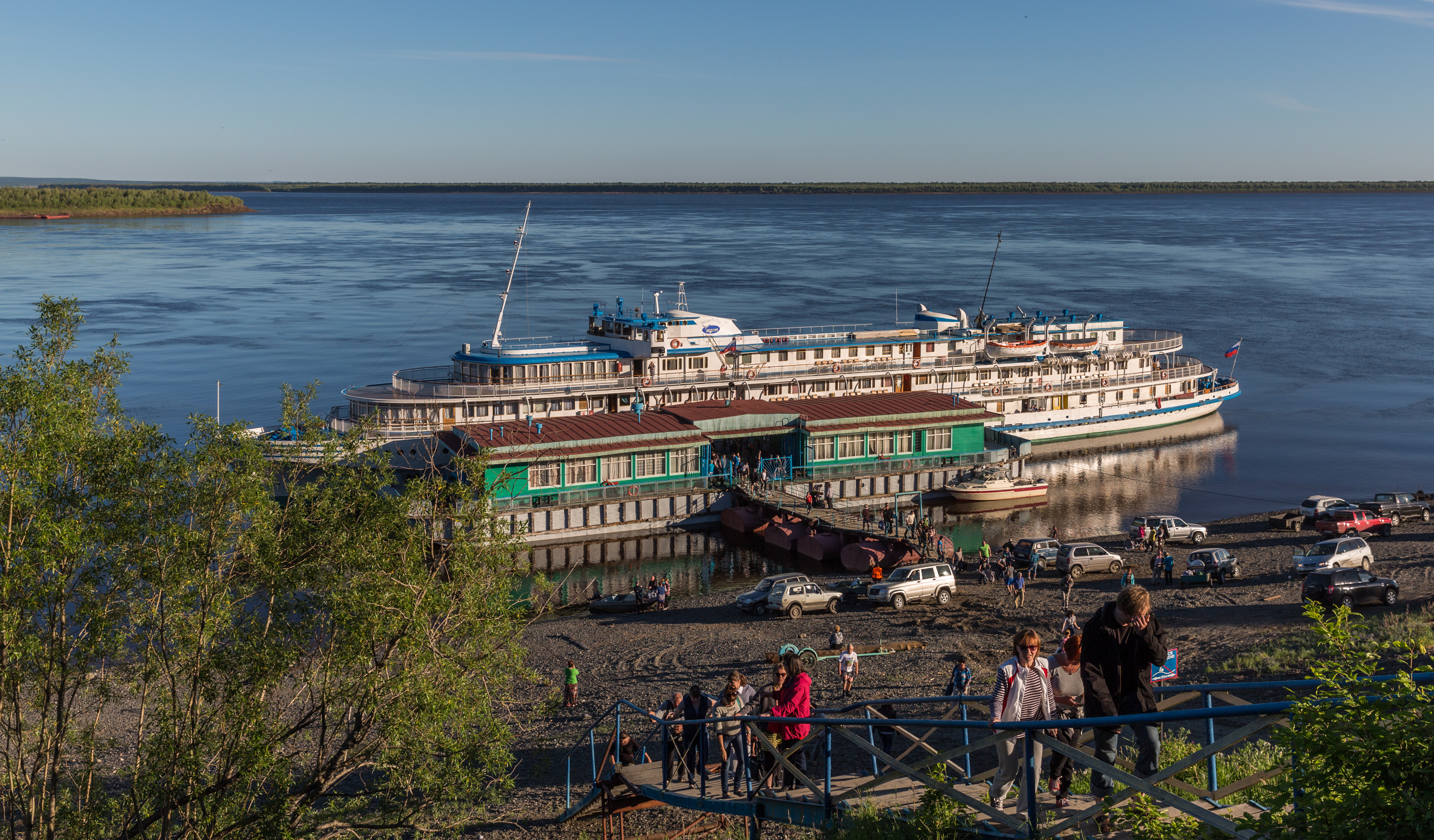
- View of the pier from Turukhansk

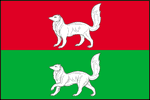
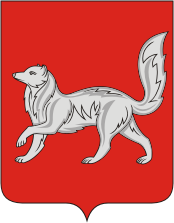
- Flag Coat of arms
- Interactive map of Turukhansk
- Location of Turukhansk Turukhansk (Krasnoyarsk Krai)
- Coordinates: 65.797°N 87.968°E
- Country: Russia
- Federal subject: Krasnoyarsk Krai
- Administrative district: Turukhansky District
- Founded: 1657
- Elevation: 7 m (23 ft)

Population
  - Estimate (2021): 3,178 )

Municipal status
  - Municipal district: Turukhansky Municipal District
- Time zone: UTC+7 (MSK+4)
- Postal codes: 663230, 663231
- Dialing code: +7 39190
- OKTMO ID: 04654434101

Turukhansk (Russian: Туруха́нск) is a rural locality (a selo) and the administrative center of Turukhansky District of Krasnoyarsk Krai, Russia, located 1,474 kilometers (916 mi) north of Krasnoyarsk, at the confluence of the Yenisey and Nizhnyaya Tunguska Rivers. Until 1924, the town was known as Monastyrskoye, and from 1924 to 1930 as Novo-Turukhansk.

It is not to be confused with Staroturukhansk, known as Turukhansk until 1920.

== History ==
One of the first Russian settlements in Siberia, Turukhansk was founded in 1607 as a winter camp (зимовье) for Cossacks and merchants. After the disastrous fires of Mangazeya in 1619, 1642 and 1662, Turukhansk welcomed a large portion of the older colony's population and became known as New Mangazeya. A timber fort with cannons was built there in 1677. The settlement hosted one of the largest fairs in Siberia and was incorporated as an uyezd town of Turukhansk in 1785. The town declined after 1822.

During the Russian Empire and the Soviet Union, Turukhansk was often used as a destination for political exile. Among people exiled there were Julius Martov, Yakov Sverdlov, Joseph Stalin, Lev Kamenev, Alexander Ulanovsky, Fedor Samoilov, Alexei Badayev, Marina Tsvetaeva's daughter Ariadna Èfron, Yuz Aleshkovsky and Archbishop Luka Voyno-Yasenetsky.

== Demographics ==
- 4,662 (2010 census)
- 4,849 (2002 census)
- 8,869 (1989 Soviet census)
- 200 (1897)

== Transportation ==
The town is served by the Turukhansk Airport.

== Climate ==
The climate of Turukhansk is classified as continental subarctic (Dfc) in the Köppen climate classification system and as continental sub-arctic (taiga) with mild summers and severely cold winters (ECld) in the Trewartha climate classification system.

Climate data for Turukhansk
Month	Jan	Feb	Mar	Apr	May	Jun	Jul	Aug	Sep	Oct	Nov	Dec	Year
Record high °C (°F)	0.5 (32.9)	0.8 (33.4)	8.7 (47.7)	15.6 (60.1)	27.5 (81.5)	33.2 (91.8)	35.5 (95.9)	31.2 (88.2)	24.9 (76.8)	16.9 (62.4)	3.4 (38.1)	1.1 (34.0)	35.5 (95.9)
Mean daily maximum °C (°F)	−21.6 (−6.9)	−17.9 (−0.2)	−7.8 (18.0)	−0.1 (31.8)	6.7 (44.1)	18.1 (64.6)	21.9 (71.4)	17.6 (63.7)	9.6 (49.3)	−1.6 (29.1)	−14.9 (5.2)	−19.6 (−3.3)	−0.8 (30.6)
Daily mean °C (°F)	−25.5 (−13.9)	−22.4 (−8.3)	−13.6 (7.5)	−5.9 (21.4)	1.9 (35.4)	12.6 (54.7)	16.6 (61.9)	13.0 (55.4)	5.9 (42.6)	−4.3 (24.3)	−18.7 (−1.7)	−23.4 (−10.1)	−5.3 (22.4)
Mean daily minimum °C (°F)	−29.5 (−21.1)	−26.5 (−15.7)	−18.7 (−1.7)	−11.3 (11.7)	−2.4 (27.7)	7.8 (46.0)	11.6 (52.9)	9.1 (48.4)	2.9 (37.2)	−6.9 (19.6)	−22.5 (−8.5)	−27.4 (−17.3)	−9.5 (14.9)
Record low °C (°F)	−57 (−71)	−55.3 (−67.5)	−50 (−58)	−42 (−44)	−26.6 (−15.9)	−8.2 (17.2)	0.1 (32.2)	−2.9 (26.8)	−17.6 (0.3)	−39.7 (−39.5)	−50 (−58)	−55.2 (−67.4)	−57 (−71)
Average precipitation mm (inches)	34.5 (1.36)	30.7 (1.21)	35.0 (1.38)	35.4 (1.39)	44.4 (1.75)	60.4 (2.38)	63.3 (2.49)	84.2 (3.31)	66.3 (2.61)	81.6 (3.21)	51.5 (2.03)	44.7 (1.76)	632 (24.88)
Average rainy days	0	0	1	6	12	18	17	20	20	11	1	0.1	105
Average snowy days	28	24	24	16	8	0.5	0	0	2	18	26	28	174
Average relative humidity (%)	76	76	73	65	64	64	69	77	79	84	80	77	74
Source: pogoda.ru.net
