= Istpart =

Commission on the History of the October Revolution

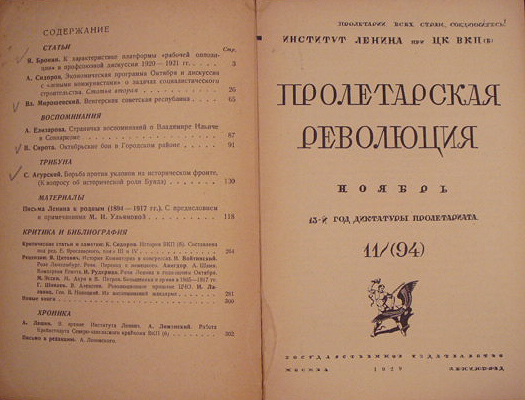
The Istpart journal, Proletarskaia revoliutsiia.

The Commission for the Collection, Study, and Publication of Materials on the October Revolution and History of the Communist Party, commonly known as Istpart (Russian: Истпарт), abbreviation of Istoriya Partii ("History of the Party"), was a research institute established in 1920 that collected, processed, archived and published history of the Communist Party of the Soviet Union and the October Revolution. Based in Moscow, by the middle of 1922 there were some 72 local divisions of Istpart established, each under the authority of the Central Committees of regional party organizations.

Istpart was organized for the dual purposes of archival collection and publication of materials relating to the Russian Communist Party and the 1917 revolution. A tension existed from the time of the agency's formation between historical scholarship and current politics, with the needs of official ideology and propaganda eventually coming to dominate over independent-minded academic inquiry by the middle 1920s.

Istpart was merged into the Lenin Institute in August 1928, ending its term as a distinct agency.

== History ==
=== Establishment ===
In August 1920, with the Civil War having turned decisively in favor of the revolutionary government, party leader V.I. Lenin sought an official history of the Russian Revolution and the Bolshevik Party and tapped Party activist and academically-trained historian Mikhail Pokrovsky, the former Bolshevik mayor of Moscow, to head the project. By the end of the month, Pokrovsky returned with a concrete proposal for an organization to promote historical scholarship. In the interim, however, party journalist Mikhail Olminsky, who although not a trained historian had previously published several works on the early history of Russian social democracy, was given the task of establishing a history commission at the State Publishing House (Gosizdat) to combine the twin goals of historical study and ideological training.

Although Pokrovsky initially sought an organization with a primary focus on scholarship rather than propaganda, including non-Communist historians in the mix, the two efforts were combined into one by decision of the Council of People's Commissars of the Russian Socialist Federation late in September 1920. The new agency, the Commission on the History of the October Revolution and the Russian Communist Party (Bolsheviks), commonly known as Istpart, was initially placed under the authority of the People's Commissariat of Education (Narkompros).

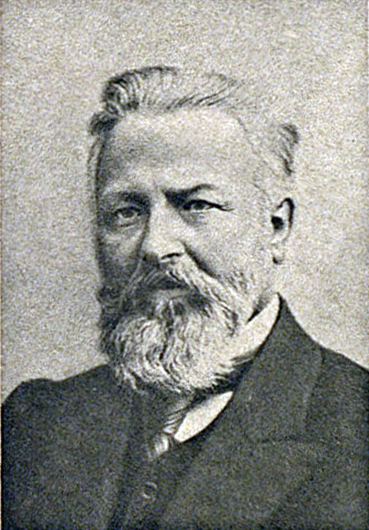
Mikhail Olminsky in 1917.

Although initially a department of Gosizdat, Istpart from the start did not focus exclusively on the publication of historical works, but also spent a great deal of effort on the collection and preservation of historic source materials. The September 21, 1920 decree transferring it to Narkompros, formally specified this collecting function, instructing the agency to collect "all types of materials, both printed and manuscript...in Russia as well as abroad, and organize special archives and libraries for their safekeeping and use."

Istpart published a regular journal, Proletarskaia revoliutsiia [Proletarian Revolution], which launched in October 1921. The publication would terminate in 1941.

On December 1, 1921, Istpart was transferred again, this time from the supervision and control of Narkompros to the Central Committee of the Russian Communist Party [RKP(b)]. This transfer was initiated by Lenin's sister, Anna Elizarova, with the support of Olminsky and Pokrovsky, and was expedited by Joseph Stalin in his capacity as head of the Agitation and Propaganda Department of the Central Committee.

=== Structure ===
Istpart was headed by a board of managers (since 1924 - the council). Daily management of its work was carried out by the Presidium: the chairman Olminsky, his deputy Pokrovsky, and the secretary V V. Adoratsky.

Istpart consisted of 2 subcommissions: on the history of the "Great Socialist October Revolution" (headed by M. N. Pokrovsky) and on the history of the party (headed by V. I. Nevsky). At first, the Istpart consisted of 9 people appointed by Sovnarkom, later its composition was increased. The decision of the Central Committee of the RKP(b) of December 3, 1921, determined the states of the central Istpart should be composed of sixty people and each local bureau two people.

Istpart was given the right to organize local bureaus on the territory of the RSFSR and all union republics. In the "Regulations on the Istpartition departments under the provincial committees of the RKP(b)", approved by the Central Committee of the RKP(b) (circular of the Central Committee of the RCP (b) No. 27 of 10 August 1923), it was indicated that their task was to "collect and study materials on the history of the October Revolution on the territory of this province and the history of this provincial party organization."

Local Istpart organizations were established in Petrograd, Moscow, Viatka, Kaluga, Tula, Voznesensk, Nizhny Novgorod, Baku, Barnaul, and other locals. Some 21 regional bureaus were established by the end of 1921, each under the supervision of the regional Communist Party Central Committee, with this number ballooning to 72 by the middle of 1922. These local organizations were in this early period not under the tight ideological control of the main Istpart organization in Moscow, and sometimes provided pluralistic interpretations of matters that would later become sacrosanct matters of official party orthodoxy.

Istaprt published over 30 magazines and various collections. In addition to its thick journal, Proletarian Revolution, and an internal Bulletin of Istpart, from 1922 the Petrograd (Leningrad) Bureau of Istpart has published the journal Krasnaya Letopis [Red Chronicle]. Regional publications were also issued, including Annals of the Revolution, published by the Istpart of the Communist Party of Ukraine, and Paths of Revolution, published by the Kazan Bureau of Istpart.

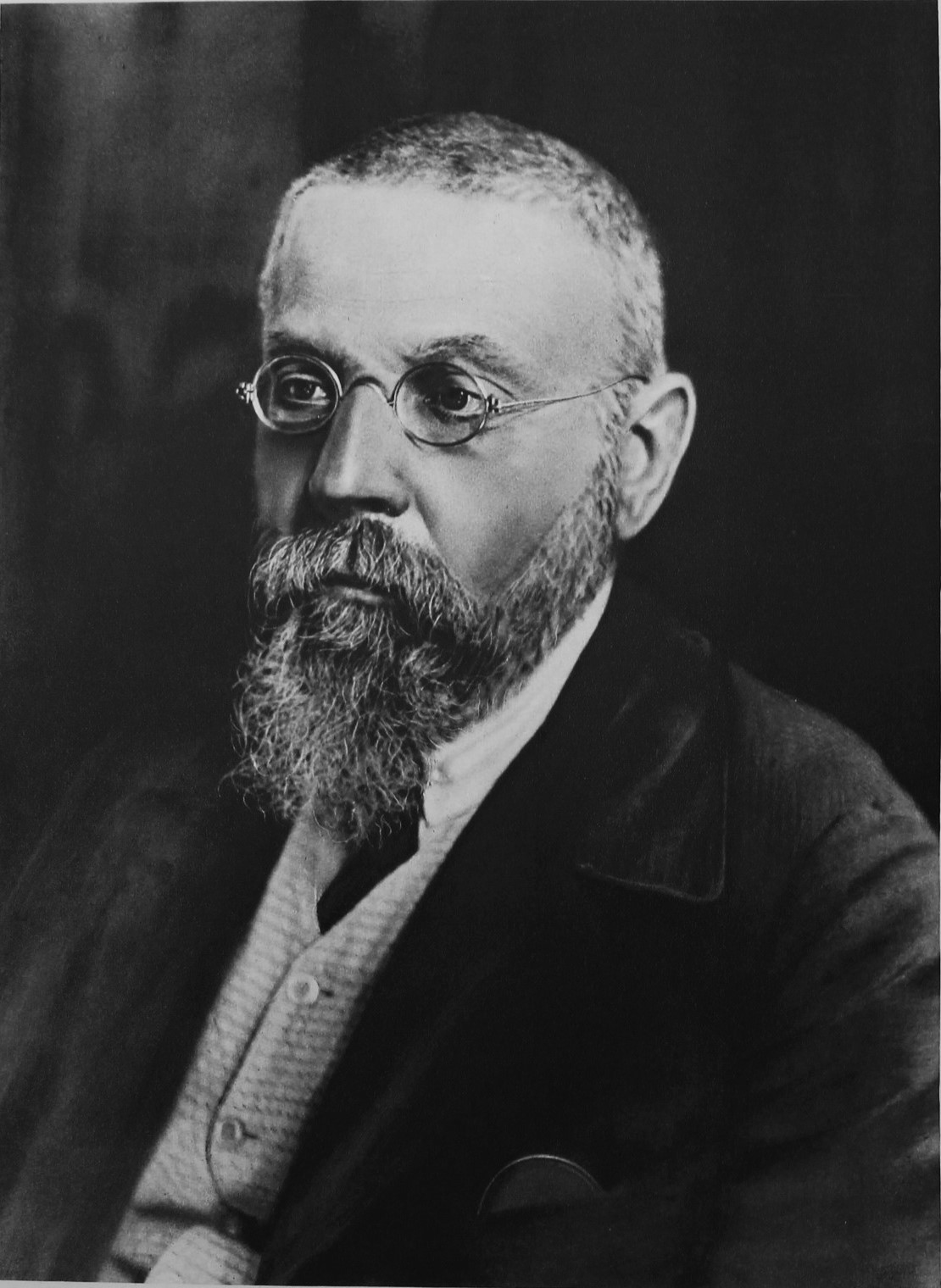
Mikhail Pokrovsky in 1930.

The Istpart archive was created in April 1924 and by the end of the 1920s. composed more than 60,000 documents, including magazines and brochures, proclamations and decrees, newspapers. It included funds from the library and archives of the Russian Social Democratic Labour Party and the GA Kuklin Library in Geneva.

=== Merger with Lenin Institute ===
By resolutions of the Central Committee of the All-Union Communist Party (Bolsheviks) dated 10 May and 20 August 1928, Istpart was merged with the Lenin Institute. The network of local Istpars were reduced from 100 to 26, the largest of them by 1931 were transformed into research institutes of the history of the party. The Istpart continued to function as a scientific department of the Lenin Institute (1928-1931).

From 1931 to 1939, the department of the Marx-Engels-Lenin Institute, which carried out scientific and methodological work, directed and controlled the activities of local branches and institutes. The journal Proletarian Revolution was published until 1941 as an organ of the MELI under the Central Committee of the All-Union Communist Party (Bolsheviks).

On 2 December 1939 the Central Committee of the All-Union Communist Party (Bolsheviks) adopted a resolution "On local party archives and institutions of Istpart", which transferred party archives from the jurisdiction of the Marx-Engels-Lenin Institute (MELI) to the direct subordination of the corresponding regional committees, regional committees and the Central Committee of the Communist Parties of the Union republics. Regional Istparts were abolished, and their functions and documentation were transferred to the party archives.

=== Legacy ===
In the view of historian Frederick C. Corney, Istpart was an organization that worked in tandem with such organizations as the Lenin Institute and the Marx–Engels Institute to craft an "ideological canon" — constructing an "unbroken teleology of party development, under the perspicacious guidance of Lenin from the split in the [RSDLP] in 1903, and forged in the revolutionary cauldrons of 1905 and 1917." Reminiscences of participants, loosely defined, were "framed...in an effort to map disparate political experiences from the previous two decades as part of a coherent revolutionary movement," he asserts.

Setting aside the agency's archival accomplishments, historian Larry E. Holmes, author of an academic monograph on Istpart, sees the organization in broadly negative terms for having sacrificed intellectual honesty on the altar of political expedience:

"Istpart's historians...initially believed they could abide by the traditional canons of scholarship and simultaneously provide a history that was of political service to their party. During the 1920s, this faith in a symbiosis of scholarship and politics began to erode, slowly at first, then rapidly. In Moscow, Istpart soon demanded a master narrative of 1917 that legitimized the party's power, past and present, whatever the facts of the matter. They also altered their understanding (or misunderstanding) of 1917 in order to empower Iosif Stalin in the venomous intra-party struggle of the mid- and late-1920s. * * *

"Consequently, well in advance of Stalin's 1931 letter to the journal Proletarskaia revoliutsiia, ... Istpart and its historians portrayed the party's past to fit the politics of its present. Some did this enthusiastically, others reluctantly, but their efforts contributed to the notion of a revolution that legitimized the formation of an authoritarian regime at home or abroad with little or no respect for scholarship."

== Conferences ==
- 2nd Conference of Istpart: April 22–24, 1923
- 3rd Conference of Istpart: May 26–27, 1924
- 4th Conference of Istpart: January 4–8, 1927
- 1st Conference of Marxist Historians: Dec. 28, 1928 – Jan. 4, 1929

Source: Holmes, Revising the Revolution, pp. xvii–xviii.
