= Bērziņš =

Family name

Origin
- Origin: Latvian
- Meaning: "little birch tree"

Other names
- Variant form: Berzin

Bērziņš (Old orthography: Be(h)rsin(g); feminine: Bērziņa) is the Latvian surname, derived from the Latvian word for "birch tree". In 2015 the two were the most common male and female surnames in Latvia. Notable people with the surname include:

== Bērziņš ==
- Aldis Berzins (born 1956), volleyball player
- Alfons Bērziņš (1916–1987), long track speed skater
- Andris Bērziņš (born 1944), politician and businessman, former President of Latvia (2011–2015)
- Andris Bērziņš (born 1951), politician
- Armands Bērziņš (born 1983), ice hockey player
- Artūrs Bērziņš (born 1988), basketball player
- Augusts Miervaldis Bērziņš (1921–2000), writer, publicist and physician
- Gundars Bērziņš (1959–2023), politician
- Jānis Bērziņš (1880s–1938), military official and politician
- Jānis Bērziņš (born 1984), biathlete
- Jānis Bērziņš (born 1993), basketball player
- Jānis Bērziņš (1881–1938), diplomat
- John Bērziņš (born 1957), bishop of Caracas and South America
- Juris Bērziņš (born 1954), rower
- Kaspars Bērziņš (born 1985), basketball player
- Māris Bērziņš (born 1962), writer and playwright
- Reinholds Bērziņš (1888–1938) Soviet politician and military officer, executed during the Latvian Operation of the NKVD
- Roberts Bērziņš (born 2001), Latvian basketball player
- Sandris Bērziņš (born 1976), luger
- Uldis Bērziņš (1944–2021), poet and translator
- Vladimirs Bērziņš (1905–?), football player and manager

== Bērziņa ==
- Ieva Bērziņa (born 1967), Latvian curler
- Ilze Bērziņa (born 1984), chess player
- Ingrīda Bērziņa (born 1954), chess player
- Laila Bērziņa (born 1965), Latvian politician
- Liene Bērziņa (born 1984), Latvian television and radio personality
- Lilita Bērziņa (1903–1983) Latvian actress
- Santa Blumberga-Bērziņa (born 1994), Latvian curler

== See also ==
- Berzin/Berzina (Russianized forms)
