= Central Committee of the 6th Congress of the Russian Social Democratic Labour Party =

Central Committee of the 6th Congress

3 August 1917 – 8 March 1918
- Third Secretary: Elena Stasova
- Technical Secretary: Elena Stasova
- Secretary: Elena Stasova
- Deputy Secretary: Elena Stasova

Candidates

The Central Committee (CC) composition was elected by the 6th Congress, and sat from 3 August 1917 until 8 March 1918. The CC 1st Plenary Session established the Narrow Composition (abolished October 1917), the Politburo (abolished November 1917) and the Bureau (established in November 1917), while sanctioning the establishment of the Secretariat on the orders of the Narrow Composition.

== Plenary sessions ==
Plenary sessions of the Central Committee
Plenum	Date	Length
1st Plenary Session	4–5 August 1917	2 days
2nd Plenary Session	10 October 1917	1 day
3rd Plenary Session	16 October 1917	1 day
4th Plenary Session	20 October 1917	1 day
5th Plenary Session	24 October 1917	1 day
6th Plenary Session	7 November 1917	1 day
7th Plenary Session	29 November 1917	1 day
8th Plenary Session	11 December 1917	1 day
9th Plenary Session	9 January 1918	1 day
10th Plenary Session	22 February 1918	1 day
11th Plenary Session	23 February 1918	1 day

== Composition ==
=== Members ===
Members of the Central Committee of the 6th Congress of the Russian Social Democratic Labour Party (Bolsheviks)
Name	Cyrillic	April CC	7th CC	Birth	Death	PM	Nationality	Gender	Portrait
Jan Berzin	Ян Берзин	New	Candidate	1881	1938	1902	Latvian	Male	
Andrei Bubnov	Андрей Бубнов	Candidate	Not	1884	1938	1903	Russian	Male	
Nikolai Bukharin	Никола́й Буха́рин	New	Reelected	1888	1938	1906	Russian	Male	
Felix Dzerzhinsky	Фе́ликс Дзержи́нский	New	Reelected	1877	1926	1906	Polish	Male	
Lev Kamenev	Лев Ка́менев	Old	Reelected	1883	1936	1901	Jewish-Russian (Note: His father was Jewish and his mother Russian)	Male	
Alexandra Kollontai	Алекса́ндра Коллонта́й	New	Not	1872	1952	1915	Ukrainian-Finnish (Note: Her father was Ukrainian and her mother Finnish)	Female	
Nikolay Krestinsky	Никола́й Крести́нский	New	Reelected	1883	1938	1901	Ukrainian	Male	
Vladimir Lenin	Владимир Ленин	Old	Reelected	1870	1924	1898	Russian	Male	
Vladimir Milyutin	Владимир Милютин	Old	Not	1884	1937	1910	Russian	Male	
Matvei Muranov	Матвей Муранов	New	Not	1873	1959	1904	Ukrainian	Male	
Viktor Nogin	Ви́ктор Ноги́н	Old	Not	1878	1924	1898	Russian	Male	
Alexei Rykov	Алексей Рыков	New	Not	1881	1938	1899	Russian	Male	
Fyodor Sergeyev	Фёдор Серге́ев	New	Reelected	1883	1921	1914	Russian	Male	
Stepan Shahumyan	Степан Шаумян	New	Not	1878	1918	1898	Armenian	Male	
Ivar Smilga	Ивар Смилга	Old	Reelected	1892	1937	1907	Latvian	Male	
Grigori Sokolnikov	Григорий Сокольников	New	Reelected	1888	1939	1905	Jewish	Male	
Joseph Stalin	Ио́сиф Ста́лин	Old	Reelected	1878	1953	1898	Georgian	Male	
Yakov Sverdlov	Я́ков Свердло́в	Old	Reelected	1885	1919	1901	Jewish	Male	
Leon Trotsky	Лев Тро́цкий	New	Reelected	1879	1940	1917	Jewish	Male	
Moisei Uritsky	Моисей Урицкий	New	Candidate	1873	1918	1917	Jewish	Male	
Grigory Zinoviev	Григо́рий Зино́вьев	Old	Reelected	1883	1936	1901	Jewish	Male	

=== Candidates ===
Candidate Members of the Central Committee of the 6th Congress of the Russian Social Democratic Labour Party (Bolsheviks)
Name	Cyrillic	April CC	7th CC	Birth	Death	PM	Nationality	Gender	Portrait
Prokofy Dzhaparidze	Прокофий Джапаридзе	New	Not	1880	1918	1898	Georgian	Male	
Adolph Joffe	Адо́льф Ио́ффе	New	Candidate	1883	1927	1910	Karaite	Male	
Aleksei Kiselyov	Алексей Киселёв	New	Candidate	1879	1937	1898	Russian	Male	
Georgy Oppokov	Гео́ргий Оппо́ков	New	Candidate	1888	1938	1903	Russian	Male	
Yevgeni Preobrazhensky	Евге́ний Преображе́нский	New	Not	1886	1937	1903	Russian	Male	
Mykola Skrypnyk	Микола Скрипник	New	Not	1872	1933	1898	Ukrainian	Male	
Elena Stasova	Еле́на Ста́сова	New	Member	1873	1966	1898	Russian	Female	
Varvara Yakovleva	Варвара Яковлева	New	Not	1884	1941	1904	Jewish	Female	

=== Prospectives ===
Prospective Members of the Central Committee of the 7th Congress of the Russian Social Democratic Labour Party (Bolsheviks)
Name	Cyrillic	April CC	7th CC	Birth	Death	PM	Ethnicity	Gender	Portrait
Valerian Osinsky	Валериан Оболенский	New	Not	1887	1938	1907	Russian	Male	
Ivan Teodorovich	Ива́н Теодо́рович	Candidate	Not	1875	1937	1898	Polish	Male	
