= Berzina =

Berzina may refer to:

- Bērziņa, feminine form of Bērziņš, Latvian surname
- Feminine form of Berzin, Russianized form of Bērziņš

== See also ==
- Berezina
