= Fiene =

Fiene is a surname. Notable people with the surname include:

- Ernest Fiene (1894–1965), American graphic artist
- Lou Fiene (1884–1964), American baseball player

== See also ==
- Fieve
- Fine (surname)
- Liene
