= Central Committee of the 7th Conference of the Russian Social Democratic Labour Party (Bolsheviks) =

Central Committee of the 7th Conference

29 April 1917 – 3 August 1917

Candidates

The Central Committee of the 7th Conference of the Russian Social Democratic Labour Party (Bolsheviks) was in session from 29 April 1917 until 3 August 1917.

== Meetings ==
The CC was not a permanent institution. It convened plenary sessions, of which one CC meeting was held between the 6th Conference and the 6th Congress. When the CC was not in session, decision-making powers were transferred to inner bodies of the CC itself; the Politburo, Secretariat and Orgburo (none of these bodies were permanent either, but convened several times a months).

Meetings of the Central Committee
Plenum	Date	Length
1st Meeting	May 1917	Unknown

== Composition ==
=== Members ===
Members of the Central Committee of the 7th Conference of the Russian Social Democratic Labour Party (Bolsheviks)
Name	Cyrillic	6th Conf.	6th Cong.	Birth	Death	PM	Nationality	Portrait
Grigory Fedorov	Григорий Фёдоров	New	Not	1891	1936	1907	Russian	
Lev Kamenev	Лев Ка́менев	New	Reelected	1883	1936	1901	Jewish-Russian (Note: His father was Jewish and his mother Russian)	
Vladimir Lenin	Владимир Ленин	Old	Reelected	1870	1924	1898	Russian	
Vladimir Milyutin	Владимир Милютин	New	Reelected	1884	1937	1910	Russian	
Viktor Nogin	Ви́ктор Ноги́н	New	Reelected	1878	1924	1898	Russian	
Ivar Smilga	Ивар Смилга	New	Reelected	1892	1938	1907	Latvian	
Joseph Stalin	Ио́сиф Ста́лин	Old	Reelected	1878	1953	1898	Georgian	
Yakov Sverdlov	Сергей Гусев	Old	Reelected	1885	1919	1901	Jewish	
Grigory Zinoviev	Григо́рий Зино́вьев	Old	Reelected	1883	1936	1901	Jewish	

=== Candidates ===
Candidate Members of the Central Committee of the 7th Conference of the Russian Social Democratic Labour Party (Bolsheviks)
Name	Cyrillic	6th Conf.	6th Cong.	Birth	Death	PM	Ethnicity	Portrait
Andrei Bubnov	Андрей Бубнов	Candidate	Member	1884	1938	1903	Russian	
Nikolai Glebov-Avilov	Николай Глебов-Авилов	New	Not	1887	1937	1904	Russian	
Alexander Pravdin	Александр Правдин	Member	Not	1885	1937	1899	Russian	—
Ivan Teodorovich	Ива́н Теодо́рович	New	Prospective	1875	1937	1898	Polish	
