= Central Committee of the 5th Congress of the Russian Social Democratic Labour Party =

Central Committee of the 5th Congress

19 May 1907 – 17 January 1912

Candidates

This Central Committee of the 5th Congress of the Russian Social Democratic Labour Party was in session from 19 May 1907 until 17 January 1912.

== Plenums ==
The Central Committee was not a permanent institution. It convened plenary sessions and meetings. One CC plenary session, fifteen meetings and one CC conference were held between the 5th Congress and the 6th Conference. When the CC was not in session, decision-making power was vested in the internal bodies of the CC itself; that is, the Politburo, Secretariat and Orgburo. None of these bodies were permanent either; typically they convened several times a month.

Meetings of the Central Committee
Plenum	Date	Length
1st Meeting	11 June 1907	1 day
2nd Meeting	16 July 1907	1 day
3rd Meeting	25 July 1907	1 day
4th Meeting	19 August 1907	1 day
5th Meeting	20 August 1907	1 day
6th Meeting	7 September 1907	1 day
7th Meeting	11–13 August 1908	3 days
8th Meeting	21 December 1908	1 day
9th Meeting	27–29 December 1909	3 days
10th Meeting	22–23 January 1910	2 days
11th Meeting	28 May – 4 June 1911	7 day

== Composition ==
=== Members ===
Members of the Central Committee of the 5th Congress of the Russian Social Democratic Labour Party
Name	Cyrillic	4th Cong.	6th Conf.	Birth	Death	PM	Faction	Nationality	Portrait
Isay Ayzenshtadt	Исай Айзенштадт	Add-on	Not	1866	1937	1906	Bund	Jewish	
Jūlijs Daniševskis	Юлий Данишевский	Old	Not	1884	1937	1906	SDLT	Latvian	
Iosif Dubrovinsky	Иосиф Дубровинский	New	Not	1877	1913	1898	Bolshevik	Russian	
Felix Dzerzhinsky	Фе́ликс Дзержи́нский	Old	Not	1877	1926	1906	SDKPiL	Polish	
Yakov Ganetsky	Яков Ганецкий	Add-on	Not	1879	1937	1906	SDKPiL	Polish	
Joseph Goldenberg	Иосиф Гольденберг	New	Not	1876	1941	1903	Bolshevik	Russian	
Fodor Ionov	Фёдор Ионов	Add-on	Not	1870	1923	1906	Bund	Jewish	
Joseph Iusiv	Иосиф Исув	New	Not	1878	1920	1902	Menshevik	Russian	—
Lev Kamenev	Лев Ка́менев	Add-on	Not	1883	1936	1901	Bolshevik	Russian	
Yan Kronberg	Ян Кронберг	Add-on	Not	1877	1938	1906	SDLT	Latvian	—
Mikhail Liber	Михаил Либер	Add-on	Not	1880	1937	1898	Bund	Jewish	
Aleksey Lyubimov	Алексей Любимов	Add-on	Not	1879	1919	1898	Bolshevik	Russian	—
Aleksandr Martynov	Александр Мартынов	New	Not	1865	1935	1899	Menshevik	Russian	
Vladimir Medem	Владимир Медем	Add-on	Not	1877	1923	1906	Bund	Jewish	
Viktor Nogin	Виктор Ногин	New	Not	1878	1924	1898	Bolshevik	Russian	
Nikolai Rozhkov	Николай Рожков	New	Not	1868	1927	1906	Bolshevik	Russian	
Ivan Teodorovich	Ива́н Теодо́рович	New	Not	1875	1937	1898	Bolshevik	Polish	
Leon Trotsky	Лев Троцкий	Add-on	Not	1879	1940	1898	Menshevik	Russian	
Aron Vaynshteyn	Арон Вайнштейн	Add-on	Not	1877	1938	1906	Bund	Jewish	
Adolf Warski	Адольф Варский	Old	Not	1868	1937	1906	SDKPiL	Polish	
Noe Zhordania	Ной Жорда́ния	New	Not	1877	1913	1898	Menshevik	Georgian	

=== Candidates ===
Candidate Members of the Central Committee of the 5th Congress of the Russian Social Democratic Labour Party
Name	Cyrillic	4th Cong.	6th Conf.	Birth	Death	PM	Faction	Ethnicity	Portrait
Alexander Bogdanov	Алекса́ндр Богда́нов	Member	Not	1873	1928	1906	Bolshevik	Russian	
Mark Broido	Марк Бройдо	New	Not	1877	1927	1900	Menshevik	Russian	—
Pyotr Bronstein	Пётр Бронштейн	New	Not	1851	1944	1900	Menshevik	Russian	—
Ansis Buševics	Анзис Бушевиц	New	Not	1878	1943	1906	SDLT	Latvian	—
Boris Gorev	Борис Горев	New	Not	1874	1937	1903	Menshevik	Russian	
Vladimir Ikov	Владимир Иков	New	Not	1882	1956	1903	Menshevik	Russian	—
Leonid Krasin	Леонид Красин	Member	Not	1870	1926	1896	Bolshevik	Russian	
Gabriel Leiteisen	Гавриил Лейтейзен	New	Not	1874	1919	1903	Bolshevik	Russian	
Vladimir Lenin	Владимир Ленин	New	Member	1870	1924	1898	Bolshevik	Russian	
Aleksandr Maletsky	Александр Малецкий	New	Not	1879	1937	1906	SDKPiL	Lithuanian	—
Julian Marchlewski	Ю́лий Цедерба́ум	New	Not	1866	1925	1906	SDKPiL	Polish	
Julius Martov	Ю́лий Цедерба́ум	New	Not	1873	1923	1896	Menshevik	Russian	
Noe Ramishvili	Ной Рамишвили	New	Not	1881	1930	1902	Menshevik	Georgian	
Alexei Rykov	Алексей Рыков	Member	Not	1881	1938	1899	Bolshevik	Russian	
Ivan Sammer	Иван Саммер	New	Not	1870	1921	1898	Bolshevik	Ukrainian	—
Virgil Shantser	Виргилий Шанцер	New	Not	1867	1911	1898	Bolshevik	Russian	—
Alexander Smirnov	Александр Смирнов	New	Not	1878	1938	1898	Bolshevik	Russian	
Viktor Taratuta	Виктор Таратута	New	Not	1881	1926	1898	Bolshevik	Russian	
Yan Týshka	Ян Ты́шка	New	Not	1867	1919	1906	SDKPiL	Lithuanian	
Konstantin Yermolayev	Константин Ермолаев	New	Not	1884	1919	1903	Menshevik	Russian	—
Grigory Zinoviev	Григо́рий Зино́вьев	New	Member	1883	1936	1901	Bolshevik	Russian	

=== Prospectives ===
Prospective Candidates of the Central Committee of the 5th Congress of the Russian Social Democratic Labour Party
Name	Cyrillic	4th Cong.	6th Conf.	Birth	Death	PM	Faction	Ethnicity	Portrait
Jan Berzin	Ян Берзин	New	Not	1881	1938	1906	SDLC	Latvian	
Vladislav Leder	Владислав Ледер	New	Not	1880	1938	1906	SDKPiL	Polish	—
Jānis Lencmanis	Ян Ленцман	New	Not	1881	1939	1906	SDLC	Latvian	
Mikhail Pokrovsky	Михаи́л Покро́вский	New	Not	1868	1932	1905	Bolshevik	Russian	
Fricis Roziņš	Фрицис Розинь	New	Not	1870	1919	1906	SDLC	Latvian	
Nikolai Semashko	Никола́й Сема́шко	New	Not	1874	1949	1898	Bolshevik	Russian	
