= Berzin =

Berzin (Russian: Берзин), feminine: Berzina, is a Russified form of the Latvian language surname Bērziņš. Notable persons with the surname include:

- Aleksandr Berzin (born 1946), Russian naval officer
- Alexander Berzin (born 1944), Buddhist Scholar, translator and teacher focusing on the Tibetan tradition
- Eduard Berzin (1894–1938), Latvian soldier and Chekist, remembered for setting up Dalstroy
- Evgeni Berzin (born 1970), Russian cyclist who won the Giro d'Italia and Liège–Bastogne–Liège in 1994
- Isaac Berzin (born 1967), chemical engineer who in 2001 founded GreenFuel Technologies Corporation
- Maia Berzina (1910–2002) Soviet ethnographer, geographer and cartographer
- Reingold Berzin (1888–1938), Russian and Soviet military leader
- Svetlana Berzina, Russian Egyptologist
- Jan Antonovich Berzin (1881–1938), Latvian village teacher, Soviet revolutionary, journalist and diplomat
- Yan Karlovich Berzin (1889–1938), Soviet military commander and politician

== See also ==
- Bērziņa
