= Fine (surname) =

Fine is an English surname. Notable people with the surname include:

- Alan Fine (executive) (born 1951), American President of Marvel Entertainment
- Alan Fine (writer) (born 1953), American author, executive coach, consultant and speaker
- Anne Fine (born 1947), British author of children's books
- Arthur Fine (born 1937), American philosopher of science
- Asipeli Fine (born 1992), Australian rugby league footballer
- Benjamin Fine (1905–1975), American journalist and author
- Bernie Fine (born 1945), former associate basketball coach at Syracuse University
- Budd Fine (1894–1966), American character actor
- Burton M. Fine (1932–2022), American politician and lawyer
- Cordelia Fine (born 1975), Canadian-born British psychologist and journalist
- Elaine Fine (born 1959), American composer, musician and music teacher
- Gary Alan Fine (born 1950), American sociologist and author
- Glenn Fine (born 1956), American lawyer and high government official
- Henry Burchard Fine (1858–1928), American mathematician and dean
- Irving Fine (1914–1962), American composer
- Jeanna Fine (1964–2025), American pornographic actress and erotic dancer
- John Fine (disambiguation)
- Kit Fine (born 1946), British philosopher
- Larry Fine (1902–1975), stage name of American actor and comedian Louis Feinberg, member of the Three Stooges
- Laura Fine (born 1967), American politician
- Larry Fine (pianos) (born 1950), American technician and author
- Lou Fine (1914–1971), American comic book artist
- Marshall Fine (born 1950), American author, journalist, filmmaker and critic
- Mason Fine (born 1997), American football quarterback
- Morton Fine (1916–1991), American screenwriter and broadcast radio writer
- Nathan Fine (1916–1994), American mathematician
- Oronce Finé (1494–1555), French mathematician and cartographer
- Ralph Adam Fine (1941–2014), American judge
- Randy Fine (born 1974), U.S. Representative and gambling industry executive
- Reuben Fine (1914–1993), American chess player and psychologist
- Sidney A. Fine (1903–1982), American lawyer, politician and member of the New York State Supreme Court
- Sidney Fine (historian) (1920–2009), American history professor
- Steven Fine (born 1958), historian of Judaism and professor
- Sylvia Fine (1913–1991), American lyricist, composer and producer, wife of comedian and actor Danny Kaye
- Terrence L. Fine, American mathematician and engineering professor
- Tommy Fine (1914–2005), American Major League Baseball pitcher
- Vivian Fine (1913–2000), American composer
- Wilma Cozart Fine (1927–2009), American classical music record producer
