= Fievez =

Fievez is a surname. Notable people with the surname include:

- Alexander Fiévez (1902–1949), Dutch politician
- Jean Fievez (1910–1997), Belgian footballer
- Jonathan Fievez (born 1978), Australian rower
- Léon Fiévez (1855–1939), Belgian official of the Congo Free State

== See also ==
- 5365 Fievez, a main-belt asteroid
- Fieve
