= Northern Front (Russian Empire) =

Northern Front Северный фронт
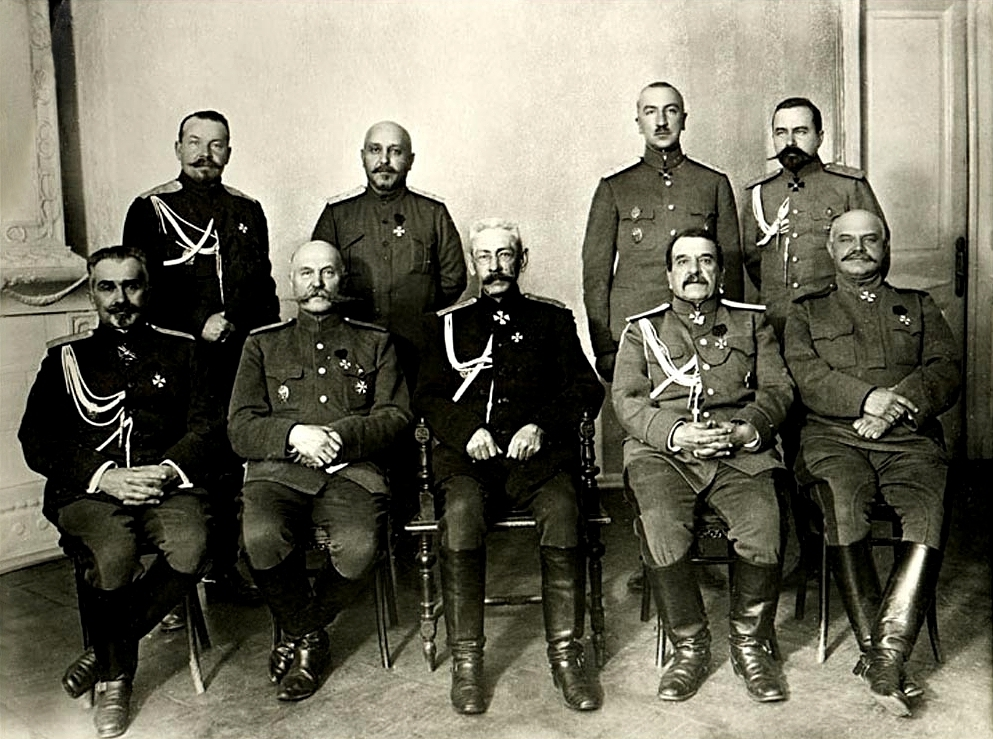
- The headquarters staff of the Northern Front, with General Nikolai Ruzsky in the center, 1917
- Active: 1915–1918
- Country: Russian Empire
- Branch: Russian Imperial Army
- Type: Army group
- Size: ~1,400,000
- Engagements: World War I: Battle of Galicia; Brusilov Offensive

Commanders
- Notable commanders: Nikolai Ruzsky; Alexei Kuropatkin

The Northern Front (Russian: Северный фронт) was an army group (Note: A "front" is the Russian equivalent of an army group, not to be confused with a geographic theater of operations.) of the Imperial Russian Army during the World War I. It was responsible for carrying out operations against the Central Powers along a front line that stretched 280 kilometers, from Riga in the north down to northern Belarus. It was established in August 1915 when the Northwestern Front was split into the Northern and Western Front following the Great Retreat, and existed until the demobilization of the Russian army in 1918 due to the unrest from the Russian Revolution. In 1917 it had a total troop strength of 1.4 million men.

== Armies of the Northern Front ==
The following field armies were part of the Northern Front.

- 5th Army (Aug. 1915 – early 1918)
- 6th Army (Aug, 1915 – Dec. 1916)
- 12th Army (Aug. 1915 – early 1918)
- 1st Army (Apr. 1916 – Jul. 1917, Sept. 1917 – early 1918)

== Commanders of the Northern Front ==
The following officers served as commanders of the Northern Front.

- 18 Aug. 1915 – 6 Dec. 1915: General of Infantry Nikolai Ruzsky
- 6 Dec. 1915 – 6 Feb. 1916: General of Infantry Pavel Plehve
- 6 Feb. 1916 – 22 Jul. 1916: General of Infantry Aleksey Kuropatkin
- 1 Aug. 1916 – 25 Apr. 1917: General of Infantry Nikolai Ruzsky
- 29 Apr. 1917 – 1 Jun. 1917: General of Cavalry Abraham Dragomirov
- 1 Jun. 1917 – 29 Aug. 1917: General of Infantry Vladislav Klembovsky
- 29 Aug. 1917 – 9 Sept. 1917: Major-General Mikhail Bonch-Bruevich
- 9 Sept. 1917 – 14 Nov. 1917: General of Infantry Vladimir Cheremisov
- 14 Nov. 1917 – 22 Nov. 1917: Major-General Sergei Lukirsky
- 22 Nov. 1917– 12 Dec. 1917: Lieutenant-General Vasily Fedorovich Novitsky

== See also ==
- List of Imperial Russian Army formations and units
- Northern Front electoral district (Russian Constituent Assembly election, 1917)
