= Northern Front electoral district =

Constituency of the Russian Republic

The Northern Front electoral district (Russian: округа Северного фронта) was a constituency created for the 1917 Russian Constituent Assembly election. The constituency covered the Northern Front of the Russian Army. And apart from the Northern Front itself, the electoral district also included the Russian troops stationed in Finland (except those under the Baltic Fleet command) as well as the Lake Peipus Flotilla. Voter turnout stood at 72.36482% per official records.

== Results ==
Northern Front
Party	Vote	%
List 5 - Bolsheviks	471,828	56.13
List 3 - Socialist-Revolutionaries and Peasants' Deputies	249,832	29.72
List 4 - Ukrainian Socialist-Revolutionaries and the Muslim National Socialist Organization	88,956	10.58
List 7 - Kadets	13,687	1.63
List 1 - Mensheviks	5,966	0.71
List 2 - Popular Socialists	5,868	0.70
List 6 - Menshevik-Internationalists (Novayazhiznists)	4,454	0.53
Total:	840,591	

Deputies Elected
Ivanov	SR
Kolerov	SR
Likhach	SR
Rabinovich	SR
Utgof	SR
Klochok	Ukrainian-Muslim List
Antonov-Ovseyenko	Bolshevik
Medvedev	Bolshevik
Nakhimson	Bolshevik
Podvoisky	Bolshevik
Sedyakin	Bolshevik
Sheiman	Bolshevik
Sklyansky	Bolshevik
Smilga	Bolshevik
Stučka	Bolshevik
Vasiliev	Bolshevik
