= Viktor Radus-Zenkovich =

Russian revolutionary and Soviet politician

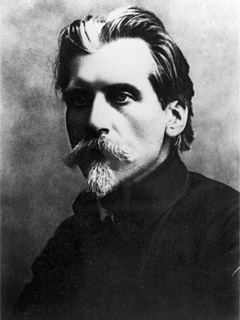
Radus-Zenkovich in 1916

Viktor Alekseevich Radus-Zenkovich (Russian: Виктор Алексеевич Радус-Зенькович; 31 December 1877 – 4 October 1967) was a Russian revolutionary Bolshevik who attained public office of chairman of the council of People's Commissars in the Kirghiz Autonomous Soviet Socialist Republic and the Soviet Union.

He was a student at Moscow University and joined the Russian Social Democratic and Labour Party (RSDLP) in 1898. He was exiled to Irkutsk Oblast in 1902, but soon escaped from there to Geneva, where he became a compositor for Iskra. However when the paper was taken over by the Mensheviks, he returned to Russia, where he got involved in party work for the RSDLP in Nikolaev, Baku, and Moscow and contributed to their military organisation in St. Petersburg and Helsinki.

He was brother-in-law of Viktor Nogin, another prominent Bolshevik.
