= Fieve =

Fieve is a surname. Notable people with the surname include:

- Carlos Luis de Ribera y Fieve (1815–1891), Spanish painter
- Ronald R. Fieve (1930–2018), American psychiatrist

== See also ==
- Fiene
- Fievez
