= Lev Khinchuk =

Soviet politician and diplomat (1868-1939)

- Лев Хинчук
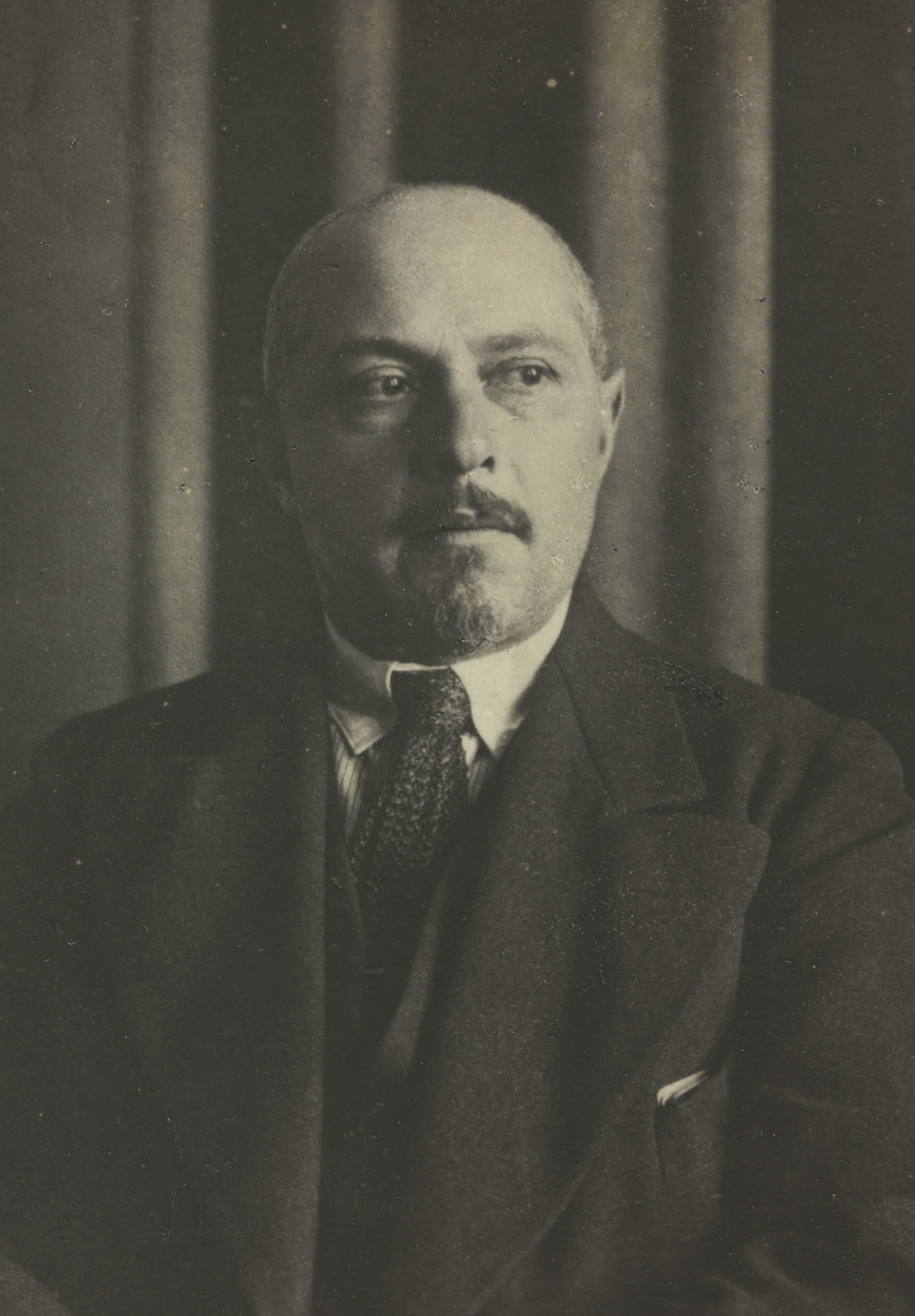
- Lev Khinchuk prior to 1922

Personal details
- Born: November 28, 1868 Poltava, Russian Empire
- Died: March 7, 1939 (aged 70) Moscow, RSFSR, Soviet Union
- Cause of death: Execution
- Party: CPSU (1898–1939)
- Education: University of Bern
- Occupation: politician, statesman, diplomat
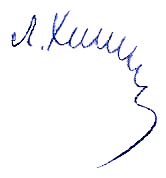
- Signature

Lev Mikhailovich Khinchuk (16 November 1868, Poltava – 7 March 1939) was a Soviet politician, statesman and diplomat.

Originally he was a member of the Menshevik faction of the Russian Social Democratic Labour Party (RSDLP) until 1919, when he applied for membership of the Russian Communist Party (Bolshevik). He was elected a member of the executive committee of the Saint Petersburg Soviet during the 1905 Russian Revolution. Following its defeat he was voted onto the executive committee of the 4th Central Committee of the RSDLP. From 1919-1939 he served as a Soviet official in numerous positions and agencies. He was executed on false charges in 1939 during the Great Purge, and rehabilitated in 1956.

== Biography ==
Lev Khinchuk was born in Poltava to the Jewish family of a tailor shop owner. He studied at a cheder and a gymnasium, and then at the philosophy department of the University of Bern. In 1890 he returned to Russia and joined the social-democratic movement. In 1898 he joined the RSDLP and later sided with the Mensheviks. In 1920 he became a member of the Bolsheviks. V. V. Vakar, who knew Khinchuk before 1905 from his work in the Kiev Committee of the RSDLP, noted his organizational skills.

Prior to 1917, Khinchuk was arrested 8 times, including in 1893 and 1914, and escaped 3 times.

From March 5 to September 11, 1917 he was Chairman of the Executive Committee of the Moscow City Council of Workers' Deputies. From May to August 1917 he was a member of the Menshevik United Committee of the RSDLP. From August 1917 he was a member of the Central Committee of the (Menshevik) United RSDLP.

On the evening of the October Revolution, at the Second All-Russian Congress of Soviets of Workers' and Soldiers' Deputies, he read out the Mensheviks' declaration protesting against the Bolshevik takeover.

In 1919, after joining the Bolshevik party, he became a board member of the People's Commissariat of Food of the RSFSR.

From 1921 he was a member of the board of the People's Commissariat of Foreign Trade of the USSR.

From 1921-1926 he was Chairman of the Central Union of Consumer Societies (Tsentrosoyuz). In 1926 he became Chairman of the All-Russian Central Cooperative Council.

From 1926-1927 he was the USSR's trade representative in the United Kingdom.

From 1927-1930 he was Deputy People's Commissar of Trade of the USSR.

From September 26, 1930 to September 20, 1934 he was Plenipotentiary Representative of the USSR in Germany.

From 1934-1937 he was People's Commissar of Internal Trade of the RSFSR.

From 1937-1938 he was the chief arbitrator of State Arbitration of the Council of People's Commissars of the RSFSR.

Khinchuk was arrested on October 23, 1938. On March 7, 1939, the Military Collegium sentenced him to death on charges of counterrevolutionary and terrorist activity. He was executed on the same day. He was rehabilitated on May 23, 1956.

A cenotaph was erected in honor of Khinchuk at the Vvedenskoye Cemetery in Moscow.
