= Rabocheye Znamya =

Rabocheye Znamya (Workers Banner) was a Russian socialist newspaper published in St. Petersburg. The group behind the publication emerged in the second half of 1897. It took a negative attitude to Economism. It set itself the aim of conducting political propaganda among the workers and published three issues appeared of Rabocheye Znamya. The group also published several pamphlets and proclamations. Among its leaders were S. V. Andropov, V. P. Nogin and M. B. Smirnov. In January 1901, the Rabocheye Znamya group merged with the Sotsialist group, but from January to April those leaders of the united group who were in Russia were arrested. Most of the members of the Rabocheye Znamya group joined the Iskra organisation.
