= Central Committee of the 4th Congress of the Russian Social Democratic Labour Party =

The Central Committee of the 4th Congress of the Russian Social Democratic Labour Party was in session from 1906 until 1907.

== Plenums ==
The Central Committee was not a permanent institution. It convened plenary sessions and meetings. Two meetings were held between the 1st Conference and the 5th Congress. When the CC was not in session, decision-making power was vested in the internal bodies of the CC itself; that is, the Politburo, Secretariat and Orgburo. None of these bodies were permanent either; typically they convened several times a month.

Meetings of the Central Committee
Plenum	Date	Length
1st Meeting	9, 11–13 July 1906	4 days
2nd Meeting	31 January 1907	1 day

== Composition ==
Members of the Central Committee of the 4th Congress of the Russian Social Democratic Labour Party
Name	Cyrillic	1st Conf.	5th Cong.	Birth	Death	PM	Faction	Ethnicity	Gender	Portrait
Raphael Abramovitch	Рафаил Aбрамович	Add-on	Not	1880	1963	1901	Bundist	Jewish	Male	
Boris Bakhmeteff	Борис Бахметьев	New	Not	1880	1951	?	Menshevik	Russian	Male	
Alexander Bogdanov	Алекса́ндр Богда́нов	Add-on	Not	1873	1928	1898	Bolshevik	Russian	Male	
Fyodor Dan	Фёдор Дан	Old	Not	1871	1947	?	Menshevik	Jewish	Male	
Jūlijs Daniševskis	Юлий Данишевский	Add-on	Reelected	1884	1938	1906	SDLT	Latvian	Male	
Vasily Desnitsky	Василий Десницкий	New	Not	1878	1958	1903	Bolshevik	Russian	Male	
Felix Dzerzhinsky	Фе́ликс Дзержи́нский	Add-on	Arrested	1877	1926	1906	SDKPiL	Polish	Male	
Leon Goldman	Леон Гольдман	New	Not	1877	1939	1898	Menshevik	Jewish	Male	—
Pyotr Garvy	Пётр Гарви	Add-on	Not	1881	1944	1900	Menshevik	Russian	Male	—
Lev Khinchuk	Лев Хинчук	New	Not	1886	1939	1898	Menshevik	Jewish	Male	
Pavel Kolokolnikov	Павел Колокольников	New	Not	1871	1938	?	Menshevik	Russian	Male	—
Leonid Krasin	Леонид Красин	Old	Not	1873	1926	1898	Bolshevik	Russian	Male	
Arkadi Kremer	Арон Кремер	Add-on	Not	1881	1944	1900	Bundist	Jewish	Male	
Viktor Krokhmal	Виктор Крохмаль	Old	Not	1873	1933	?	Menshevik	Ukrainian	Male	
Lyubov Radchenko	Любовь Радченко	New	Not	1871	1962	1898	Menshevik	Russian	Female	
Vladimir Rozanov	Владимир Розанов	New	Not	1876	1939	?	Menshevik	Russian	Male	
Alexei Rykov	Алексей Рыков	Old	Arrested	1881	1938	1899	Bolshevik	Russian	Male	
Adolf Warski	Адольф Варский	Add-on	Reelected	1868	1937	1906	SDKPiL	Jewish	Male	
Sergey Yezhov	Сергей Ежов	Add-on	Not	1879	1939	1898	Menshevik	Russian	Male	
