= Central Committee of the 6th Conference of the Russian Social Democratic Labour Party (Bolsheviks) =

Central Committee of the 6th Conference

17 January 1912 – 3 August 1917

Candidates

The Central Committee of the 6th Conference of the Russian Social Democratic Labour Party (Bolsheviks) was in session from 17 January 1912 until 3 August 1917.

== Plenums ==
The Central Committee was not a permanent institution. It convened plenary sessions and meetings. One CC plenary session, fifteen meetings and one CC conference were held between the 6th Conference and the 7th Conference. When the CC was not in session, decision-making power was vested in the internal bodies of the CC itself; that is, the Politburo, Secretariat and Orgburo. None of these bodies were permanent either; typically they convened several times a month.

Convocations of the Central Committee
Plenum	Date	Length
1st Plenary Session	Held between 12 and 17 January 1912	1 day
1st Meeting	19 January 1912	1 day
2nd Meeting	Held either 12 or 13 November 1912	1 day
3rd Meeting	26 December 1912 – 1 January 1913	6 days
4th Meeting	Held either 31 January or 1 February 1913)	1 day
5th Meeting	10–13 March 1913	4 days
6th Meeting	27 July 1913	1 day
7th Meeting	23 September – 1 October 1913	8 days
8th Meeting	1 October 1913	1 day
9th Meeting	13 November 1913	1 day
10th Meeting	27–29 December 1913	3 days
11th Meeting	2–4 April 1914	3 days
12th Meeting	28 June and 6 July 1914	2 days
13th Meeting	Held between 29 June and 6 July 1914	1 day
14th Meeting	24–26 August 1914	3 days
15th Meeting	30 September – 1 October 1914	2 days
Conference of the Foreign Sections	14–19 February 1915	6 day

== Composition ==
=== Members ===
Members of the Central Committee of the 6th Conference of the Russian Social Democratic Labour Party (Bolsheviks)
Name	Cyrillic	5th Cong.	7th Conf.	Birth	Death	PM	Nationality	Portrait
Aleksei Badayev	Алексей Бадаев	Add-on	Arrested	1883	1951	1904	Russian	
Ivan Belostotsky	Иван Белостоцкий	Add-on	Not	1882	1968	1904	Russian	—
Filipp Goloshchekin	Филипп Голощёкин	New	Arrested	1876	1941	1903	Russian	
Mikhail Kalinin	Михаил Калинин	Promoted	Not	1875	1946	1898	Russian	
Aleksei Kiselyov	Алексей Киселёв	Add-on	Arrested	1879	1936	1898	Russian	
Vladimir Lenin	Владимир Ленин	Candidate	Reelected	1870	1924	1898	Russian	
Roman Malinovsky	Рома́н Малино́вский	New	Expelled	1876	1918	1906	Russian	
Vyacheslav Molotov	Вячеслав Молотов	Add-on	Not	1890	1986	1906	Russian	
Vladimir Nevsky	Владимир Невский	Promoted	Not	1876	1937	1898	Russian	
Grigol Ordzhonikidze	>Григо́рий Орджоники́дзе	New	Arrested	1886	1937	1903	Georgian	
Grigory Petrovsky	Григо́рій Петро́вський	Add-on	Arrested	1878	1958	1898	Ukrainian	a bearded man with wavy hair, wearing glasses and what seems to be a suit, a white tie, and a black and white dotted shirt
Alexander Pravdin	Александр Правдин	Add-on	Candidate	1879	1938	1899	Russian	—
David Schwartzman	Давид Шварцман	New	Not	1884	1968	1904	Russian	—
Alexander Shliapnikov	Алекса́ндр Шля́пников	Add-on	Not	1885	1937	1901	Russian	
Alexander Shotman	Александр Шотман	Add-on	Arrested	1880	1937	1899	Finnish	
Suren Spandaryan	Сурен Спандарян	New	Died	1882	1916	1901	Armenian	
Joseph Stalin	Ио́сиф Ста́лин	Add-on	Reelected	1878	1953	1898	Georgian	
Yakov Sverdlov	Сергей Гусев	Add-on	Arrested	1885	1919	1901	Russian	
Pyotr Zalutsky	Пётр Залуцкий	Add-on	Not	1887	1937	1907	Russian	
Grigory Zinoviev	Григо́рий Зино́вьев	Candidate	Reelected	1883	1936	1901	Russian	

=== Candidates ===
Candidate Members of the Central Committee of the 6th Conference of the Russian Social Democratic Labour Party (Bolsheviks)
Name	Cyrillic	5th Cong.	7th Conf.	Birth	Death	PM	Ethnicity	Gender	Portrait
Andrei Bubnov	Андрей Бубнов	Add-on	Candidate	1884	1938	1903	Russian	Male	
Mikhail Kalinin	Михаил Калинин	Add-on	Promoted	1875	1946	1898	Russian	Male	
Vladimir Nevsky	Владимир Невский	Add-on	Promoted	1876	1937	1898	Russian	Male	
Stepan Shahumyan	Степан Шаумян	Add-on	Not	1878	1918	1898	Armenian	Male	
Alexander Smirnov	Александр Смирно	Add-on	Not	1878	1938	1896	Russian	Male	
Elena Stasova	Еле́на Ста́сова	Add-on	Arrested	1873	1966	1898	Russian	Female	
