= Liene =

Female given name

- Gender: Female
- Name day: August 18

Origin
- Origin: From a diminutive of Helēna
- Region of origin: Latvia

Liene is a Latvian feminine given name. The associated name day is August 18.

== Notable people named Liene ==
- Liene Bērziņa (born 1984), Latvian television and radio personality
- Liene Fimbauere (born 1989), Latvian alpine skier
- Liene Jansone (born 1981), Latvian basketball player
- Liene Liepiņa (born 1957), deputy of the Latvian Saeima
- Liene Lutere (born 1976), Latvian rower
- Liene Priede (born 1990), Latvian basketball player
- Liene Sastapa (born 1972), Latvian rower
- Liene Vāciete (born 1991), Latvian football striker
