= Miervaldis Birze =

Latvian writer and physician

- Born: 21 March 1921; Rūjiena, Latvia
- Died: 6 July 2000 (aged 79); Cēsis, Latvia

Miervaldis Birze (born Augusts Miervaldis Bērziņš; 21 March 1921 – 6 July 2000) was a Latvian writer, publicist, and physician.

== Biography ==
Birze was born into the family of a municipal employee in Rūjiena. He completed primary school in 1933. After the Soviet occupation of Latvia in 1940, Birze joined the Young Communist League. He was arrested in July 1941, after the Occupation of Latvia by Nazi Germany. He was first held in prison in Valmiera, then transferred to the Salaspils concentration camp. After this, he was assigned to do forced labor in the construction of a hangar at the Spilve Airport in Riga. In July 1944, he was among 1,200 people transported to Germany and interned in the Buchenwald concentration camp. In April 1945, during the evacuation of the camp, Birze managed to escape. He tried to return home through Poland, where he was arrested and held from May until September in an NKVD filtration camp in Hrodna. The time he spent in these camps and prisons is reflected in his literary works, especially in his novel Yet Icebound Rivers Flow.

He graduated from the University of Latvia Faculty of Medicine in 1949. After his graduation, he worked as a doctor in Cēsis. He died there in 2000.

== Yet Icebound Rivers Flow ==
"I took to writing when I was in my thirties. By then, I had finished secondary school in Valmiera on the lovely Gauja River, had been a medical student in Riga for two years, had spent four years of the war in various concentration camps in Latvia and in Germany, Buchenwald included, had resumed my medical studies, graduated, and been a doctor for several years. My first short stories and humorous sketches were published in 1953. In 1957, I discarded humour and wrote Yet Icebound Rivers Flow. Why did I touch once more the wounds inflicted on the Latvian people by German fascists? Does not every human being, like you and me, yearn for sunshine, for peace, for kindness? Is it necessary to bring back to mind pain and sufferings? Yes. It was necessary to write this book. First, because I knew all the people in it, good and bad, and was present at the funeral of those two whose bodies were burnt. Second, because it would have been unjust to allow the heroism of true enthusiasts to slip into oblivion, to forget those who gave everything for the happiness of their people. Finally, this event has to be recalled so that what happened then may never reoccur. I did not succeed in rendering the event in its entirety. But who has been able to paint the ocean in all its fathomless grandeur? I only hope that the events described here will never repeat themselves, so that I may continue to live in Cēsis, a little town on the Gauja, and cure people with weak lungs, and write humorous short stories."

Miervaldis Birze, from Yet Icebound Rivers Flow.

== English translations ==
- Yet Icebound Rivers Flow, Foreign Languages Publishing House, Moscow. from Archive.org

== Sources ==
- Rožkalne, Anita; LU literatūras, folkloras un mākslas institūts (2003). Latviešu rakstniecība biogrāfijās (in Latvian). Riga: Zinātne. p. 87. ISBN 9984-698-48-3. OCLC 54799673.
