= Laila Bērziņa =

Latvian politician

Laila Bērziņa (born 1965) is a Latvian politician who is a deputy of Līgatne City Council belonging to the New Era Party, currently she also work as a school teacher.
