= Terrence L. Fine =

American mathematician (1939–2021)

Terrence L. Fine (March 9, 1939 – January 31, 2021) was an American scientist, engineer and philosopher. He is known especially for his contributions to the defense and development of alternatives to the classical calculus for probabilistic modeling and decision-making. Other contributions include Fine's theorem, the Fine numbers and the Fine–McMillan quantizer. He was the recipient of the first patent awarded in the area of statistical delta modulation.

== Biography ==
Fine was born in New York City on March 9, 1939. His academic degrees were from the City College of New York (B.E.E.) and from Harvard University (S.M., Ph.D.). He was awarded a Miller Research Fellowship at the University of California Berkeley for the period 1964 to 1966, after which he joined the faculty of Cornell University in Ithaca, New York, where he remained until his retirement in 2010. There he served as Professor in the Department of Electrical and Computer Engineering; concurrently, as Professor in the Department of Statistical Sciences; and from 1999 to 2004, as Director of the university's multidisciplinary Center for Applied Mathematics. He was a Professor Emeritus at Cornell. He was a Life Fellow and Third Millennium Medalist of the IEEE (Institute of Electrical and Electronics Engineers).

== Selected publications ==
- Theories of Probability: An Examination of Foundations, Academic Press, 1973. A study of mathematical and interpretive alternatives to the standard framework for mathematical probability.
- Feedforward Neural Network Methodology, Series on Statistics for Engineering and Information Science, Springer-Verlag, 1999.
- Probability and Probabilistic Reasoning for Electrical Engineering, Pearson/Prentice-Hall, 2006.
- "An argument for comparative probability", in R. Butts, J. Hintikka, eds., Basic Problems in Methodology and Linguistics III, Univ. Western Ontario Ser. Philosophy of Science, 11, D. Reidel, Dordrecht, 105–119, 1977.
- "On the apparent convergence of relative frequency and its implications", IEEE Transactions on Information Theory, IT-16, 251–257, 1970. Source of Fine's Theorem.
- "Extrapolation when very little is known about the source", Information and Control, 16, 331–359, 1970. A non-statistical approach to extrapolation, and source of the Fine numbers.
