= John Fine =

John Fine may refer to:

- John Fine (politician) (1794–1867), a U.S. Representative from New York
- John Christopher Fine, American author, attorney, marine biologist, photojournalist
- John S. Fine (1893–1978), former Governor of Pennsylvania
- John V. A. Fine (1903–1987), American classical scholar
- John V. A. Fine Jr. (born 1939), American historian
