= Svetlana Berzina =

Russian Egyptologist

- Светлана Берзина
- Born: 7 March 1932; Moscow, Russian SFSR, Soviet Union
- Died: 24 April 2012 (aged 80); Moscow, Russia

Academic background
- Education: Institute of Oriental Studies of the USSR Academy of Sciences; Moscow State University (doctor nauk)

Academic work
- Discipline: Historian
- Sub-discipline: Egyptology; Meroë
- Institutions: State Museum of Oriental Art

Svetlana Yakovlevna Berzina (Russian: Светлана Яковлевна Берзина; 7 March 1932 – 24 April 2012) was a Russian Egyptologist. A doctor nauk of history (1977), she was a member of the board of the USSR-ARE Society (1987), was awarded the Medal "In Commemoration of the 850th Anniversary of Moscow" (1997), Honoured Worker of the Russian Federation (1999), Chief Research Officer of the Department of the History of Material Culture and Ancient Art of the East at the State Museum of Oriental Art, Moscow.

== Career ==
She studied history in the archaeology department of Taras Shevchenko National University of Kyiv (1949–1954). From 1954, she worked as research staff at the Kerch Archaeological Museum. From 1960 to 1981 she worked in the Asian and African division of the Central Library of the scholarly foundation AN USSR (INION RAN) in Moscow. During this period she studied full-time at the graduate institute of Eastern Languages at Moscow State University (in what is now the MSU Institute of Asian and African Studies) in the Africanist department. From 1965 to 1970, she worked in this department. In 1970, she defended her thesis, entitled Предпосылки образования Древней Ганы (Background of Education in Ancient Ghana). In 1977, she started to work towards the degree of doctor nauk in history in the department of the Ancient Near East in the Institute of Oriental Studies of the USSR Academy of Sciences and she successfully achieved it in 1979 with a work entitled Мероэ и окружающий мир. I—VIII вв (Meroë and the Surrounding World. 1st–8th Centuries AD). From 1981 she was employed by the State Museum of Oriental Art, Moscow.

Berzina was acknowledged as a specialist in the history and culture of Ancient Meroë and was involved in many international conferences on Meroitic research. Her central area of interest was the role of art in contacts between ancient civilizations. For over 15 years, Berzina was custodian of the foundation Геммы, печати и буллы Востока (Gems, Seals and Bullae of the East). She worked on the attribution of items of African art which came into the museum, a significant portion of the collection that was enriched by her active work with private collectors. In the museum's African collection, she prepared a comprehensive catalogue for publication, Оружие и художественный металл Тропической Африки в собрании Государственного музея Востока (Weapons and Artistic Metalwork of Sub-Saharan Africa in the Collections of the State Museum of the East). Berzina published more than 150 scholarly works, including two monographs.

Berzina was often involved in the exhibitions of the State Museum of Oriental Art and several exhibitions were prepared by her, including: Пирамиды вечности (Pyramids of Eternity), Древние геммы и камни Востока (Ancient Gems and Stones of the East), Образы Тропической Африки (Imagery of Tropical Africa), Христианство на Золотом роге (Christianity in the Golden Horn).

== Death ==
Berzina died in the April 2012, at the age of 81.

== Awards and honours ==
- Medal "In Commemoration of the 850th Anniversary of Moscow" (1997)
- Honoured Worker of the Russian Federation (1999)

== Selected works ==
- 1992. Мероэ и окружающий мир. I—VIII вв. (Meroë and the Surrounding World. 1st–8th centuries AD)
- 2001. Образы Тропической Африки. Каталог выставки. (Imagery of Tropical Africa: Exhibition Catalogue) 80 pages. 6 plates.
- 2010. Древние геммы Востока. (Ancient Gems of the East).

=== Articles ===
- 1999. Корабль «Исида» в контексте взаимоотношений Египта и Боспора в конце IV — первой пол. III в. до н. э. (The Ship "of Isis" in the Context of the Relationship of Egypt and Bosporus at the end of the 4th and start of the 3rd century BC) in Боспорский город Нимфей: новые исследования и материалы и вопросы изучения античных городов Сев. Причерноморья. СПб: 8–9.
- 2000. African Art in the Museums of America and Europe. Situations, Trends, Views of a Common Cultural Space at the Turn of the 21st Century.
- 2000. Керамическая печать из Самарканда (Ceramic Seals of Samarkhand) in Средняя Азия: Археология. История. Культура.: 19–25.
- 2000. Печать с месопотамскими сюжетами из Согдианы (Seals with Mesopotamian Subjects from Sogdia) in Древность: историческое знание и специфика источника: 31–34.
- 2001. Египетская выставка в Государственном музее Востока (Egyptian Exhibition at the State Museum of the East) in Вестник древней истории Vol. 3: 217—218.
- 2002. Две эфиопских воинских награды из собрания Государственного музея Востока (Two Ethiopian Military Awards from the Collection of the State Museum of the East) in Ethnologica africana. Памяти Дмитрия Алексеевича Ольдерогге: 303—315, Tbl. 1–2.
- 2002. Кони в глиптике Древнего Востока и образ ахалтекинца на древних геммах и печатях (Horses in Glyptics of the Ancient East and the Image of the Akhal-Teke in Ancient Gems and Seals) in Мирас. Ашгабат Vol. 1: 62–70 (Turkmen); 114—122 (Russian); 168—176 (English).
- 2004. Свв. Афанасий, Пахомий и христианская церковь Аксума в IV—V вв. н. э. Краткие тезисы доклада. (St Athanasius, Pachomius and the Christian Church of Axum in the 4th–5th centuries AD. Brief Summary) in Alexander Kakovkin. Научное заседание, посвященное 135-летию со дня рождения Б. А. Тураева (11 июня 2003 г., Санкт-Петербург) ВДИ Vol.1: 254.
- 2005. Древние архивы Тропической Африки (Ancient Archives of Tropical Africa) in Архивы — ключ к истории Африки ХХ в.: 107—119.
- 2005 [2006]. Стеклянный медальон из Самарканда (Glass Medallion from Samarkhand) in Центральная Азия. Источники, история, культура: 191—204.
- 2006. Ахеменидские геммы в Хорезме (Achaemenid Gems from Khwarezm) in Российская археология Vol. 3: 85–94.
- 2006. Египтяне и мероиты в IV в. н. э. Резюме доклада (Egyptians and Meroeites in the 4th C AD. Summary Report." in XIV Сергеевские чтения на Кафедре истории древнего мира исторического факультета МГУ им. М. В. Ломоносова. (Москва, 2–4 февраля 2005 г.) ВДИ, Vol.1: 222.
