= Ivar Smilga =

Latvian communist politician (1892–1937)

- Ивар Смилга
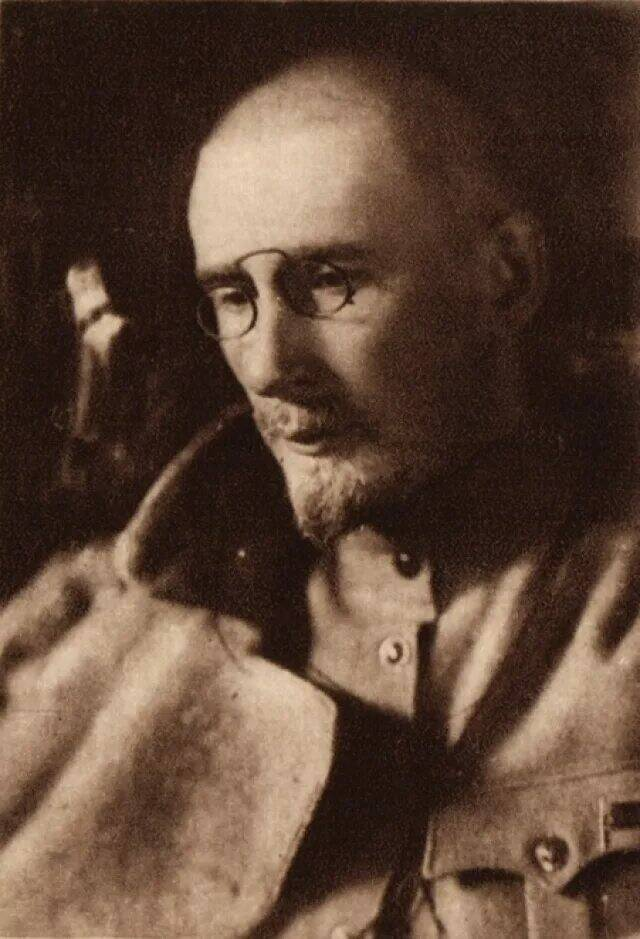
- Smilga c. 1917

Deputy Chairman of the State Planning Committee
- In office 1930–1934
- Premier: Vyacheslav Molotov
- Preceded by: Nikolai Vashkov
- Succeeded by: Emanuel Kviring
- In office 1924–1926
- Premier: Alexei Rykov
- Preceded by: Georgy Pyatakov
- Succeeded by: Nikolai Vashkov

Rector of the Moscow Institute of National Economics
- In office 1925–1927
- Preceded by: Nikolai Chelyapov
- Succeeded by: Artemic Khalatov

Representative of the Russian SFSR to the Finnish Socialist Workers' Republic
- In office 16 February 1918 – 9 April 1918
- Premier: Vladimir Lenin
- Preceded by: Office established
- Succeeded by: Konstantin Kovanko

Member of the Russian Constituent Assembly
- In office 25 November 1917 – 20 January 1918 (Note: The Constituent Assembly was declared dissolved by the Bolshevik-Left SR Soviet government, rendering the end the term served.)
- Preceded by: Constituency established
- Succeeded by: Constituency abolished
- Constituency: Northern Front

Personal details
- Born: 2 December 1892 (N.S.) Aloja, Governorate of Livonia, Russian Empire
- Died: 10 January 1937 (aged 44) Moscow, Russian SFSR, Soviet Union
- Cause of death: Execution by firing squad
- Resting place: Donskoye Cemetery
- Party: RSDLP (1907–1914); RSDLP (Bolsheviks) (1914–1918); RCP(b) (1918–1927)
- Other political affiliations: Left Opposition (1925–1929)
- Spouse: Nadezhda Poluyan
- Children: Tatyana; Natalya
- Education: Imperial Moscow University
- Central institution membership: 1917–1920, 1925–1927: Full member, 7th–8th, 14th Central Committee of RCP(b); 1920–1921, 1922–1923, 1924–1925: Candidate member, 9th, 11th, 13th Central Committee of RCP(b); Other offices held: 1919–1921: Head, Politdepartment and Politdirectorate of the Revolutionary Military Council of the Russian SFSR; 1918: Political Commissar, Northern Section of the Screen Detachments

Ivar Tenisovich Smilga (Russian: И́вар Тени́сович Сми́лга; Latvian: Ivars Smilga; 2 December 1892 – 10 January 1937) was a Latvian Bolshevik leader, Soviet politician and economist. He was a member of the Left Opposition in the Soviet Union.

== Early life ==
Ivar was born in Aloja in the Governorate of Livonia (modern Latvia), to parents he described as "land-owning farmers" and "highly intellectual." His father played an active part in the 1905 Revolution, and was elected Chairman of the Revolutionary Administrative Committee for his district. In 1906, Tenis Smilga was caught and killed by a punitive expedition sent to crush the revolt in Livonia.

== Revolutionary career ==
Smilga joined the Russian Social Democratic Labour Party (RSDLP) as a 14-year schoolboy, in January 1907, and was arrested for the first time during a May Day demonstration that year. In 1910, he was again arrested for taking part in a student demonstration in Moscow to mark the death of Leo Tolstoy, calling for the abolition of the death penalty, but was released after one month in prison. He was rearrested in July 1911, as a member of the illegal RSDLP organisation in the Lefortovo District, held in custody for three months, then deported to Vologda for three years. He returned in 1914, after the outbreak of the First World War, and joined the Petrograd Bolshevik party committee. Rearrested in May 1915, he was sentenced to three years deportation in Yeniseysk.

=== Role in 1917 ===
Freed as a result of the February Revolution, Smilga returned to Petrograd, and became a leading figure in the Bolshevik organisation in the Kronstadt naval base. In May, he was Kronstadt's delegate to the Seventh Conference of the Bolshevik faction of the RSDLP, at which, despite his being only 24 years old, former fellow Siberian exiles put him forward as a member of the nine-member Central Committee. During 1917, he was Vladimir Lenin's most consistent ally and supporter in calling for a second revolution led by the Bolsheviks. In June, Lenin and Smilga submitted their resignations from the Central Committee after the majority agreed to call off an anti-government demonstration due to be held on 10 June, but both resignations were rejected. Smilga had wanted the demonstration to escalate into a revolutionary crisis in which power would be seized by the First Congress of Soviets, then in sessions, and urged that they should not "hesitate to seize the Post Office, telegraph and arsenal, if events developed" – but the Congress, which was dominated by supporters of the Kerensky government, insisted on the demonstration being called off.

During the Sixth Congress of the Bolshevik party, in August 1917, Smilga declared that the soviets had "committed suicide" by not opposing the government, and that the party should be ready to seize power alone. "No-one has the right to deprive us of this initiative if fate gives us another chance," he declared. Responding to a fellow Bolshevik who had urged caution, he said: "Let me remind him of Danton's words: 'In revolution, one needs boldness, boldness, and more boldness!"

In September, Smilga led the Bolshevik delegation at the Third Regional Congress of Soviets in Helsingfors (Helsinki) – the capital of Finland, which was then under Russian rule – and was elected Chairman of the Regional Committee of the Soviets, a position carrying real power because of the collapse of the government authority in the wake of the Kornilov affair. Lenin was then hiding in Helsingfors, and "entered into a sort of conspiracy with Smilga", sending a long and angry letter on 27 September complaining that their fellow Bolsheviks were "passing resolutions" instead of "preparing their armed forces for the overthrow of Kerensky." In mid-October, Smilga returned to Petrograd for the Congress of Northern Region Soviets, and stayed to help plan the Bolsheviks seizure of power. Just before the October Revolution, he was sent back to Finland with orders to send 1500 armed sailors to Petrograd to act as reserves in case any troops from the front came to attack the city.

== Political career ==
Smilga returned to Petrograd in January 1918, after the Bolsheviks had been routed in the brief civil war that led to the creation of an independent Finland, and served as a member of the praesidium of the Petrograd soviet and an editor of the Bolshevik newspaper Petrogradskaya Pravda. He consistently backed Lenin's line over whether to sign the Treaty of Brest-Litovsk, which ended the war with Germany. He was transferred to political work in the Red Army at the start of the Russian Civil War, and acted as a political commissar on every major front. He was chief political commissar on the southern front, for the campaign against the army of General Denikin. In January 1921, he was appointed political commissar on the Caucasus front, and head of the Caucasian Labour Army.

=== Relations with Trotsky ===
During the early part of 1919, Smilga was involved in a conflict over conduct of the civil war, which saw him aligned with Joseph Stalin against Leon Trotsky the People's Commissar for War and future leader of the Left Opposition. Smilga, Mikhail Lashevich and Sergei Gusev were political commissars on the Eastern Front, fighting the army of Admiral Kolchak. The military commander was Sergei Kamenev, a former Colonel in the Imperial Army. The Red Army commander in chief Jukums Vācietis wanted them to halt operations once they had driven Kolchak's army east of the Urals, rather than risk pursuing him into Siberia. Trotsky supported him. Smilga, Lashevich and Kamenev insisted on continuing the offensive, which was a spectacular success.

In May, Smilga was appointed head of the Political Directorate of the Red Army. With Stalin's support, he proposed that Kamenev should replace Vācietis as commander in chief, against Trotsky's advice. After Lenin had overruled Trotsky, in July 1919, Smilga, Gusev and Kamenev joined Trotsky on the six-member Revolutionary Council of War. Reportedly, Smilga was summoned by Lenin to be warned that he could not take Trotsky's place as Chairman of the Revolutionary Military Council.

=== Relations with Stalin ===
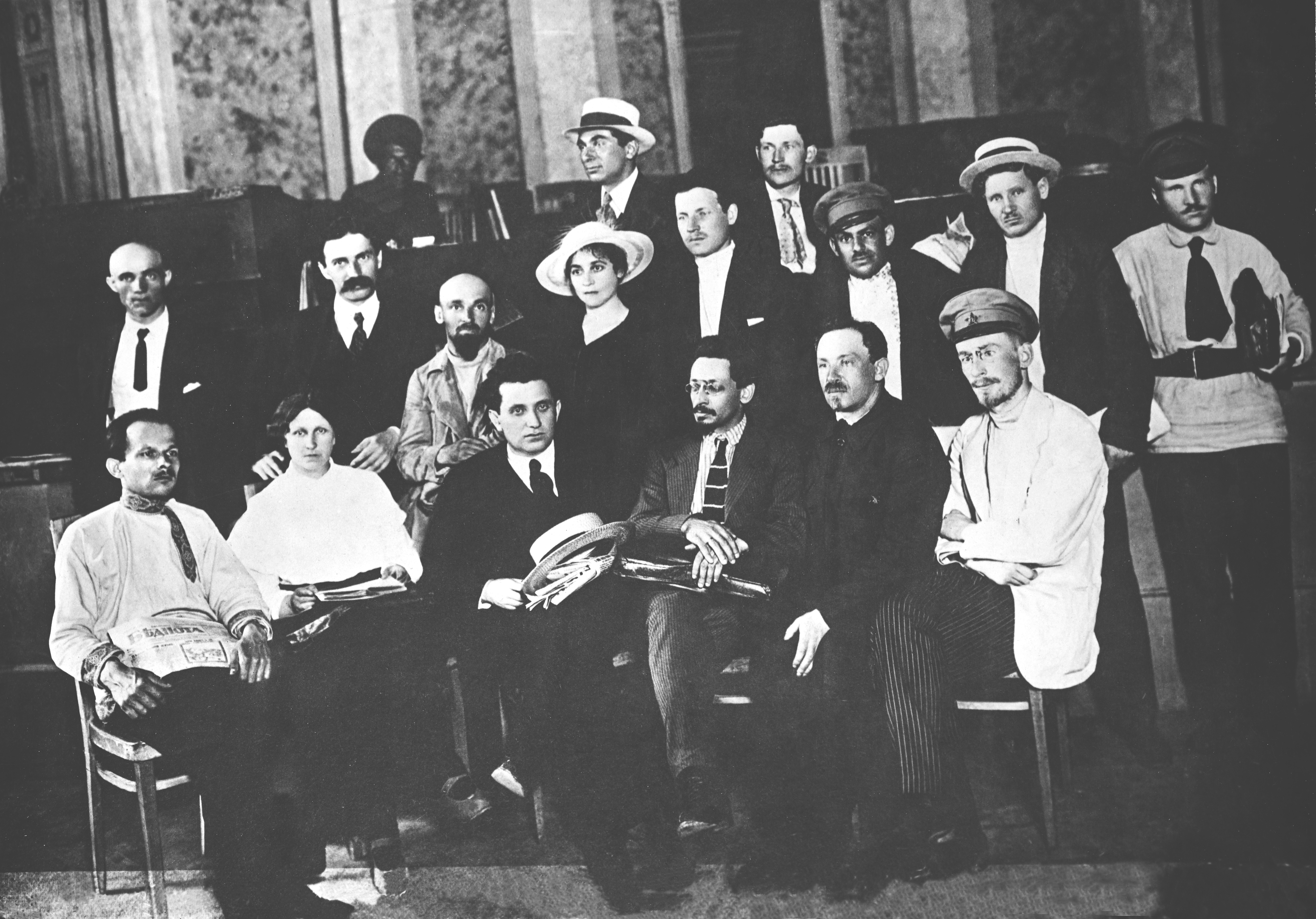
Smilga (front row, far right) among the Communists on the Fifth All-Russian Congress of Soviets on 6 July 1918

During the war between Russia and Poland, in 1920, Smilga headed the Revolutionary Military Council of the Western Front, whose military commander was Mikhail Tukhachevsky. When the Red Army met unexpectedly strong resistance as it reached the outskirts of Warsaw, Tukhachevsky ordered the Southwestern front to turn northwards, but Stalin, who was the front's political commissar, refused, preferring to capture Lwow. At the Tenth party congress in March 1921, there was a secret session on why Russia lost the war, at which – according to Trotsky:

Stalin came out with the declaration, equally startling in its viciousness and untruthfulness, that Smilga...had 'deceived the Central Committee' by 'promising' to take Warsaw by a definite date...I protested on the spot against this startling insinuation: Smilga's 'promise' meant merely that he had hoped to take Warsaw."

=== Post-war career ===
Smilga was dropped from the Central Committee in March 1921. Soon afterwards, he was appointed head of the Main Directorate for Fuel. He was also vice-chairman of the Vesenkha from 1921 to 1928, and of the Gosplan from 1924 to 1926. In December 1925, he was elected a full member of the Central Committee, although in August 1925, Stalin complained about Smilga's influence in Gosplan and denounced him as a "fake economic leader."

At some point in 1926, or earlier, Smilga joined the Left Opposition, led by Trotsky. As head of the fuel administration, Smilga was one of the first soviet administrators to try draw up a plan for a section of soviet industry. As a believer in planning, he complained that "some elements of the state apparatus (and the apparatus is also in large measure a heritage of the old order) are against the plan in general." In May 1926 he declared: "We must force the industrialisation of the economy. Trotsky also argued for economic planning and rapid industrialisation.

Smilga acted as spokesman for the opposition on economic affairs at the crucial meeting at which Trotsky was expelled from the Central Committee. In June 1927, Smilga was dismissed, and transferred to Khabarovsk, in Siberia, more than 5,000 miles from Moscow. On the day of his departure from Moscow ...

...several thousand Oppositionists and their friends gathered at the Yaroslavl railway station to see him off and to demonstrate against the surreptitious victimisation. The crowd was angry. The demonstration was unprecedented ... the farewell became the Opposition's first public, though only half-premeditated, demonstration against the ruling group.

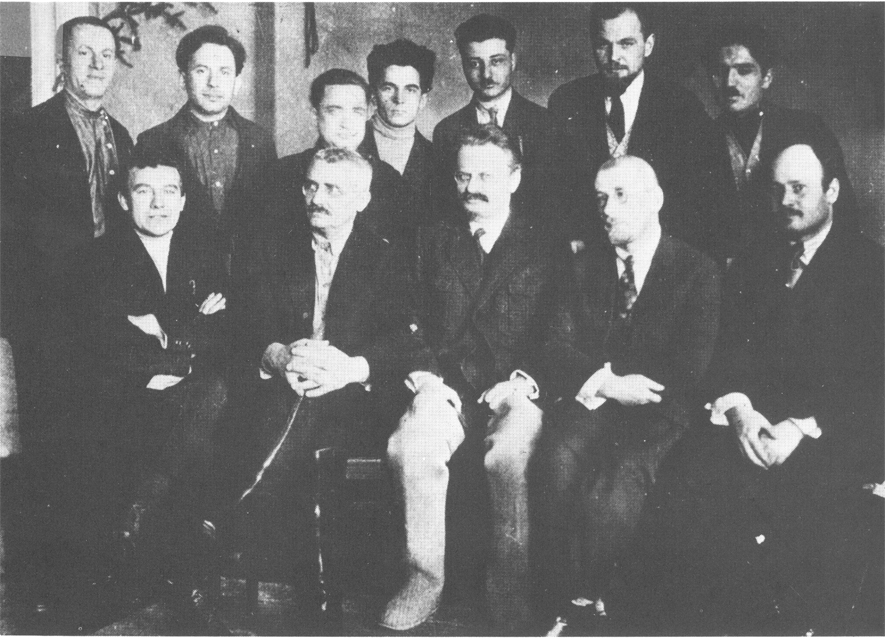
Smilga sitting to the right of Leon Trotsky alongside other members of the Left Opposition

Smilga returned to Moscow for the tenth anniversary of the Bolshevik revolution, on 7 November 1927, and organised a demonstration from his family's apartment opposite the Kremlin, hanging out portraits of Lenin, Trotsky and Zinoviev, and a banner saying "Let's Fulfill Lenin's Testament" (in which Lenin had called for Stalin to be removed from office). After his apartment had been forcibly entered and wrecked by Stalin's supporters, he attempted to continue protesting in the street, but was attacked, and arrested. He escaped from custody later in the day.

On 14 November, Smilga was expelled from the Central Committee. He was expelled from the communist party in December. In June 1928, he was sentenced for four years exile in Minusinsk, in Siberia.

In July 1929, along with Yevgeni Preobrazhensky, Karl Radek, he renounced his support for the Left Opposition, citing the reason that Joseph Stalin's rise would have meant the application of much of the Left's recommended policies, and that the dangers the Soviet state faced, from the outside as well as from within, required their "return to the Party". About 400 other deportees followed their lead. His membership of the communist party was restored in 1930, and he was allowed to return to economic work. Trotskyist historian Pierre Broué suspected he was a member of the secret opposition bloc Trotsky, Zinoviev and Kamenev had created in 1932.

=== Arrest and execution ===
Smilga was arrested on the night of 1–2 January 1935, in the wake of Sergei Kirov's assassination, and sentenced to five years imprisonment. He was held for months in an isolator in Verkhneuralsk. At the first of three Moscow show trials, in August 1936, the lead defendant Grigory Zinoviev named Smilga as having been implicated in the 'Trotskyite–Zinovievite Terrorist Centre'. It later emerged in Trotsky's letters that Zinoviev and Trotskyists had indeed formed a secret alliance, but there was no evidence of terrorist activity in them. Unlike almost all the other eminent Old Bolsheviks named during the proceedings, he was never subjected to a public trial, suggesting that the NKVD had not been able to break his spirit sufficiently to be able to rely on him to confess. He was sentenced to death at a closed trial on 10 January 1937 and executed the same day – one of the first prominent Old Bolsheviks to be shot without a public trial.

== Personality ==
A scientist working in Russia in the 1920s, who had no reason to speak well of Smilga, and in face held him responsible for the execution of a group of technicians from the former Nobel company during the civil war, nevertheless believed that he should have been appointed head of Vesenkha. "He seemed to me quite superior to all other members of the Praesidium...He was well educated, with vigorous and pleasant features, and authoritative in speech and action...he impressed me favourably by his frankness and the fearless way he expressed his convictions, even when they were quite the opposite of those of his party colleagues." Viktor Serge, a fellow supporter of the left opposition, described Smilga as "a fair-haired intellectual with spectacles, a chin-beard, and thinning front, ordinary to look at and distinctly the armchair sort."

== Family ==
Smilga's wife, Nadezhda Vasilievna Poluyan (1896–1937) was born into a Cossack farming family in Kuban joined the Bolsheviks in 1915, and was expelled from the party, as he was, in 1928 but later readmitted. She was working as a secretary for a combine that carried out repairs in the energy industry when she was arrested on 1 July 1936. In November, she was sentenced to 10 years in prison on Solovketsky island. On 10 October 1937, she was arraigned before a tribunal, sentenced to death, and shot.

They had two daughters, Tatyana, (1919–2014), and Natasha, born (c1921–1950). Tatyana was arrested on 11 June 1939, as a student at the Moscow Institute of Foreign Languages, and spent four years and four months in a labour camp, and was then held in administrative exile until 1953, and was rehabilitated and permitted to return to Moscow in 1956. Natasha was arrested in 1949, and exiled until 1953.

Nadezhda's brother, Dmitri Poluyan (1886–1937) joined the Bolsheviks in 1904, and chaired the Tsaritsyn (Stalingrad) party committee before 1918. He worked as a journalist after 1917. Arrested on 21 December 1934, he was sentenced to five years exile in Omsk region. Rearrested in September 1936, he was sentenced to death on 31 July 1937 and shot the same day. His brother, Yan Poluyan (1891–1937), who worked in the energy sector, was arrested on 26 July 1937, sentenced to death on 8 October, and shot the same day.

Smilga was posthumously rehabilitated in 1987.
