= Maia Berzina =

Maia Yanovna Berzina (Russian: Майя Яновна Берзина; October 25, 1910 in Paris – August 30, 2002) was a prominent Soviet ethnographer, geographer and cartographer (member of Soviet Geographic Society from 1954). Among her scores are "Americans" entry in the Great Soviet Encyclopedia (3rd ed., 1970) and several maps in the Great Soviet World Atlas (vol. 1 and 2). Overall she was the author of about fifty original ethnic maps.

== Early years ==
The father, Yan Berzin, a Latvian, was arrested and shot in 1938. Mother Roza Garmiza, originally a Jewish socialist-revolutionary, was arrested in the same year and died in imprisonment. Berzina was born in immigration, in Paris and spent most of her childhood abroad, mainly in England, being fluent in English. She graduated from MSU's geographic faculty as an econogeographer. She declared herself a cosmopolite, even in the 1950s, when this word was discouraged in the Soviet Union. Berzina spent only few months of her childhood in Russia, finally settling in Moscow in 1927. In 1937 she married Leonid Vasilevsky, a gifted econogeographer and part-time geographer.

== Later work ==
Berzina joined the fresh-formed Peoples Maps Group at the Ethnography Chair of Moscow State University, where she compiled the maps of ethnic compound of Switzerland, India, United States and other countries. During the German-Soviet War, Berzina was evacuated to Tashkent, returning to Moscow in 1943. She was hired as a junior research fellow to the newly established Miklukho-Maklay Ethnography Institute of Soviet Academy of Sciences and worked there until pensioning off in 1984, being elevated to senior research fellow in 1975. In 1969 she upheld a thesis "Forming of the Ethnic Compound of Canadian Population" and published a book of the same name. Berzina was also a permanent contributor of the Soviet Ethnography journal, translating the journal summaries into English.

== Some credits ==
- Map of the peoples of Hindustan (published 1956)
- Map of the peoples of South-East Asia (with S. Bruk, 1962)
- Maps of South Asia, Indonesia, North, Central and South America (volumes from Peoples of the World series)
- Seventeen maps (some as co-author) for Atlas of the World Nations (1964)
