= Liene Bērziņa =

Latvian television and radio personality

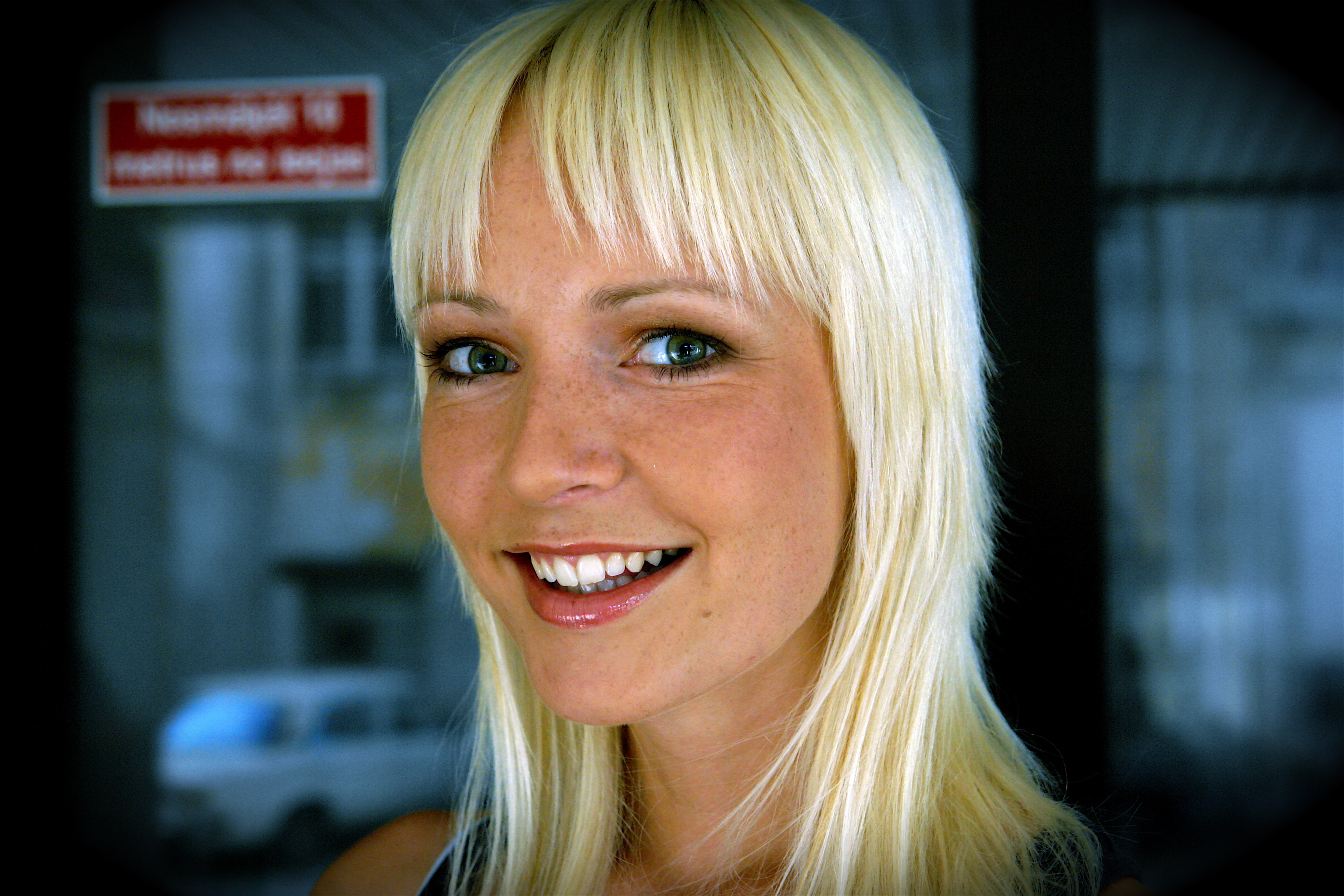

Liene Bērziņa (born Liene Zostiņa 27 September 1984 in Smiltene) is a Latvian television and radio personality. She appeared in the show Zvaigžņu lietus.
