= Jan Antonovich Berzin =

Latvian diplomat

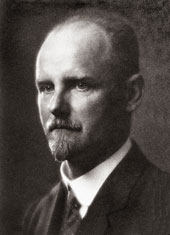
Jan Antonovich Berzin

Jan Antonovich Berzin (Russian: Ян Антонович Берзин, Yan Antonovich Berzin, Latvian: Jānis Bērziņš, alias Ziemelis; 11 October 1881 – 29 August 1938) was a Latvian village teacher, later Bolshevik revolutionary, journalist and Soviet diplomat. He was Ambassador of the Soviet Union to Austria between 1925 and 1927. He was executed during the Great Purge and posthumously rehabilitated in 1956.

== Early life ==
Berzin was born into a Latvian peasant family in the Russian Empire. He completed the pedagogical seminar, and then worked as a village teacher, and began spreading revolutionary propaganda among the peasants. He joined the Russian Social Democratic Labour Party in 1902. In 1904, he was arrested and exiled to Olonets Governorate, but he escaped in 1905, and worked as a political agitator in the Baltic region during the 1905 Russian Revolution. In December 1905, he was arrested again, by the punitive expedition led by General Orlov. Released from prison in 1907, he settled in St Petersburg and took on the job of secretary of the St Petersburg committee of the Russian Social Democratic Labour Party (RSDLP). In 1907 he was a delegate of the 5th Congress of the Russian Social Democratic Labour Party, in London. He emigrated in 1908, and lived Switzerland, France, Belgium, Britain and the USA.

Under the alias "Ziemelis", Berzin took part in the Zimmerwald Conference (1915) for the Social-Democracy of the Latvian Territory, a territorial organisation of the RSLP. As a member of this organisation, Berzin published its organ Proletariāta cīņa (Proletarian Struggle). In 1916–17, he edited the Latvian social-democratic journal Strādnieks in Boston, and contributed to the left 'Zimmerwaldist' newspaper Novy Mir in New York.

Bērzin returned to Russia after the February Revolution. At the 6th Congress of the Russian Social Democratic Labour Party (Bolsheviks), in August 1917, he was elected a full member of the Central Committee. He was one of the majority of the 21-member committee who backed Vladimir Lenin's line that the Bolsheviks should overthrow the Provisional Government and seize power. He was also a member of the Central Committee of the Social Democratic party of Latvia.

== Diplomatic career ==
From May to November 1918, he led the political delegation of the Bolsheviks in Switzerland, which was, alongside Sweden, one of the first countries that recognized the Soviet Republic. However, on 12 November 1918, the Soviet mission was expelled from the area by the Swiss Federal Council on charges of espionage and revolutionary actions. This led to a break of relations between Moscow and Bern. From January to May 1919 he belonged to the short-lived Latvian Socialist Soviet Republic as the People's Commissar for Education. In 1919 to June 1920, he was secretary of the Executive Committee of the Communist International (ECCI). He was involved in the Treaty of Tartu in 1920. After resigning from his position at the Communist International, Berzin was repeatedly sent as ambassador to the European countries. He represented the interests of Soviet Russia in Finland from February 1921 onwards. In 1921–25, he was Deputy Head of the Diplomatic Mission in the UK. In June 1925 he became the successor of Adolf Joffe, the representative of the Soviet Union in Austria. In 1927 he was replaced by Konstantin Yurenev.

Subsequently, he became Plenipotentiary of the Committee of Foreign Affairs of the People's Commissars of the Ukrainian SSR and a member of the Central Committee of the Communist Party of Ukraine. From 1929 to 1932 he was deputy head of the commission for the publication of diplomatic documents.

== Arrest and execution ==
From 1932 he headed the Central Archive Administration of the USSR and was editor of the magazine "Red Archive". During the Great Purge, as a part of the so-called "Latvian Operation", Berzin was arrested in December 1937, and shot at the Kommunarka shooting ground on 29 August 1938 on charges of conspiring with "imperialistic forces". He was rehabilitated in 1956, during the Khrushchev Thaw.

== Family ==
His wife was Roza Abramovna Garmiza, the daughter of a merchant, a member of the Socialist Revolutionary Party and later of the All-Union Communist Party (Bolsheviks). She was arrested on March 16, 1938, and died in custody.

His daughter, Maya Berzina (1910-2002), was a prominent Soviet ethnographer, geographer and cartographer.

== Bibliography ==
- Branko M. Lazić, Milorad M. Drachkovitch: Biographical Dictionary of the Comintern, Hoover Press, 1986, pp. 27–28.
