= Viktor Nogin =

Russian Bolshevik revolutionary and politician

- Виктор Ногин
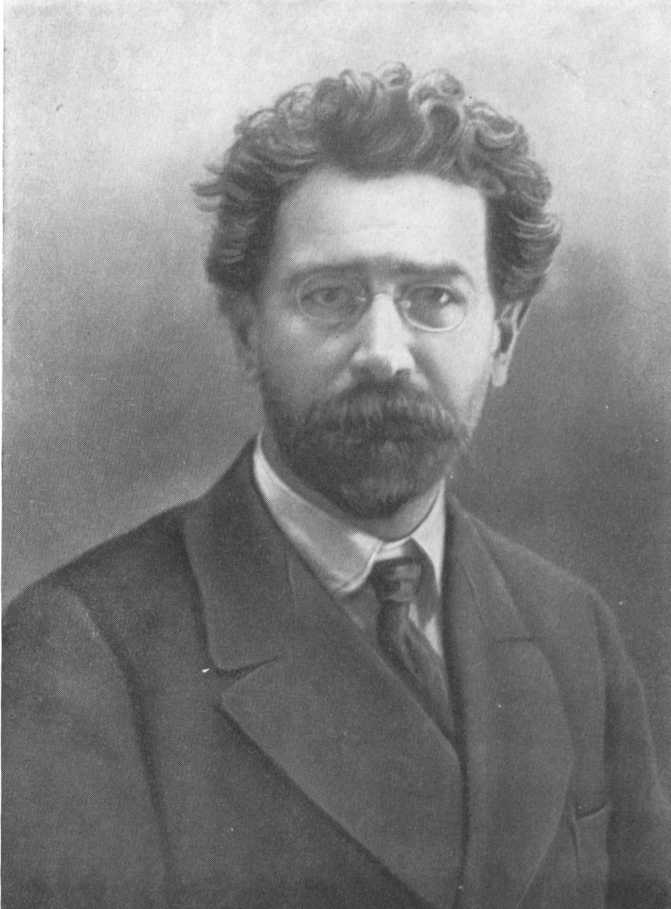
- Nogin in 1914

Chairman of the Central Auditing Commission of the Communist Party
- In office 16 March 1921 – 22 May 1924
- Preceded by: Post established
- Succeeded by: Dmitry Kursky

Chairman of the Executive Committee of the Moscow City Council
- In office 19 September 1917 – 13 November 1917
- Preceded by: Vadim Rudnev
- Succeeded by: Mikhail Pokrovsky

Personal details
- Born: Viktor Pavlovich Nogin; 14 February 1878 Moscow, Moscow Governorate, Russian Empire
- Died: 22 May 1924 (aged 46) Moscow, Russian SFSR, Soviet Union
- Resting place: Kremlin Wall Necropolis, Moscow
- Party: RSDLP (1898–1903); RSDLP (Bolsheviks) (1903–1918); Russian Communist Party (Bolsheviks) (1918–1924)

Viktor Pavlovich Nogin (Russian: Ви́ктор Па́влович Ноги́н; 14 February [O.S. 2 February] 1878 – 22 May 1924) was a Russian Bolshevik revolutionary, Soviet politician, and statesman in Moscow, holding many high positions in the party and in government, including Chairman of the Moscow Military Revolutionary Committee and Chairman of the Presidium of the Executive Committee of Moscow Council of Workers' Deputies (Mayor of Moscow). He was a member of first the Council of People's Commissars, i.e., the first Government of Soviet Russia, as People's Commissar for Commerce and Industry.

== Biography ==
Viktor Nogin, born in Moscow, then part of the Russian Empire, was the son of a clerk. He left school at 14, and worked in a textile factory in St Petersburg. In 1898, he joined the Russian Social Democratic Labour Party (RSDLP). He was arrested that same year and exiled to Poltava. In 1900, he emigrated. He returned to Russia, having agreed to act as a distributor of Iskra, the newspaper founded abroad by Vladimir Lenin and Julius Martov. When the RSDLP split into factions in 1903, Nogin joined the Bolsheviks. In 1907, he was a delegate to the RSDLP congress in London, where he was elected to the Central Committee. During his years as a revolutionary, operating illegally in Russia, he was arrested eight times, and escaped six times.

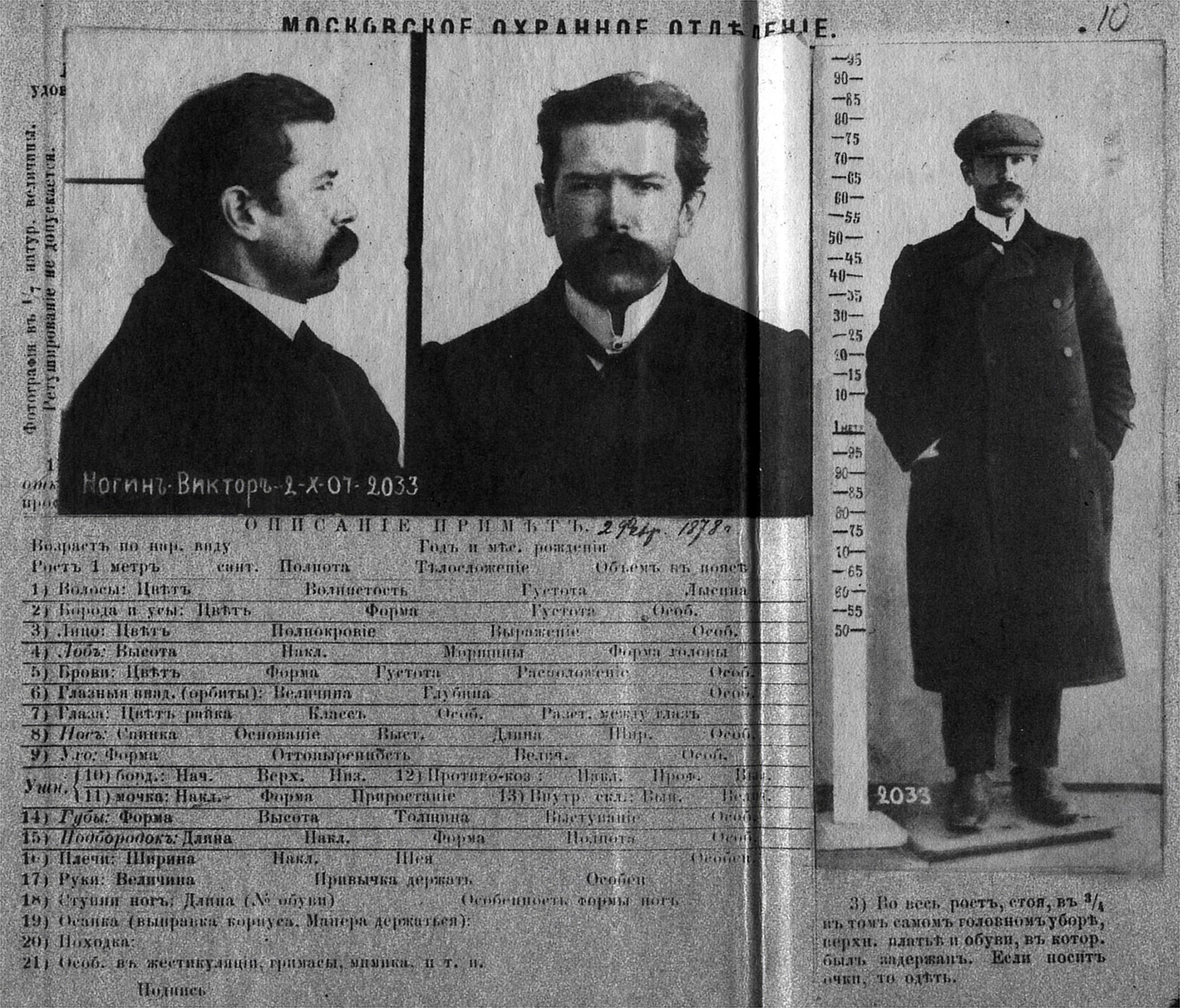
Nogin police card, 1907

Within the Bolshevik faction, Nogin was a 'conciliator' who wanted to reunite the RSDLP. In January 1910, he was one of the organisers of a three-week conference in Paris, called by the Central Committee. As part of the preparations, he travelled to Baku, hoping to enlist Joseph Stalin, then known as 'Koba' but failed to make contact with him. At the conference, Lenin was repeatedly outvoted, as the delegates decided in favour of reuniting the Bolsheviks and Mensheviks. According to Nadezhda Krupskaya, Lenin's widow, Nogin wanted to "unite everybody", including those who wanted to abandon illegal activity, but when he returned to Russia to try to put this into effect, he was rebuffed by the Bolsheviks there. He was arrested in April 1911, for the last time, and spent five years in prison.

By 1917, Nogin was one of the leaders of the Moscow branch of Bolsheviks. In April, he was chaired the party conference convened while Lenin was still absent abroad, and when a lone delegate raised the possibility of a second, Bolshevik revolution (democratic February Revolution occurred earlier that year), Nogin ruled him out of order. The conference elected him to the Central Committee.

After Lenin had returned and was calling for a second revolution, Nogin was one of the leading Bolsheviks who argued against him. At the Sixth Party Congress, in August, he warned: "Is it possible, comrades, that our country has made such a leap in two months that it is already prepared for socialism? Where are our allies? So far, we have only the platonic sympathy of the Western European proletariat ... We will find active support only in the “rotten” Soviets". Despite being in what soon became the minority, he was re-elected to the Central Committee in August, with the fifth highest vote (behind Lenin, Grigory Zinoviev, Lev Kamenev and Leon Trotsky. He was a member of the Provisional Committee during the struggle against General Lavr Kornilov's affair in Petrograd. From September to November 1917 He was the chairman of the Executive Committee of Moscow Soviet of People's Deputies (Mayor of Moscow). As Chairman of the Moscow Military-Revolutionary Committee, Nogin tried to lead a peaceful and bloodless transfer of power to the Bolsheviks, hoping to avoid more bloodshed in Moscow. Before a session of the RSDLP Central Committee on 1 November 1917, he joined in advocating the creation of a coalition government involving all of the socialist parties, claiming that a Bolshevik-only government could only be sustained through terror. This was rebuffed by other Bolsheviks and not realized.

Nogin was appointed People's Commissar for Commerce and Industry after the October Revolution but resigned on 17 November, along with Kamenev, Zinoviev, Rykov, Milyutin and others, – after he had presented a declaration repudiating "the preservation of power of a purely Bolshevik government by means of terror."

Nogin formally admitted "his mistakes" on 12 December (29 November Old Style) 1917, but at Lenin's insistence, his request to be re-admitted to the Central Committee was not granted until January 1918, when he was appointed Commissar for Labour for the Moscow Region. In March, he was permanently dropped from the Central Committee, but in April, Nogin was appointed Deputy People's Commissar for Labour. In this position, he enjoyed great deal of authority in foreign trade and industry circles, accompanying Leonid Krasin to London for the negotiations over the Anglo-Soviet Trade Agreement.

In 1923, Nogin was appointed head of the Soviet textile trust. Unable to purchase raw cotton from the United States, Nogin travelled to New York in August 1923, and negotiated a deal with Anderson, Clayton & Co, one of the United States' largest cotton exporters, which was the first trade deal between a US company and the communist regime. While there, he helped the Coolidge administration communicate with Moscow using the code of the Soviet government, in an attempt to establish relations between the two countries. He died soon after he had returned to Moscow.

Viktor Nogin is buried in the Grave No. 6 of the Kremlin Wall Necropolis on the Red Square, Moscow.

== Family ==
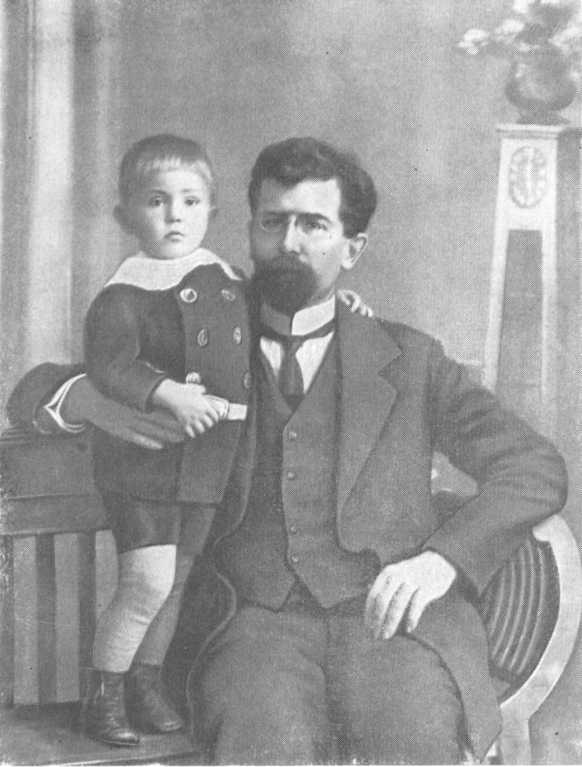
Viktor Nogin with his son in 1914

He married Olga Pavlovna Ermakova, (1885–1977) with whom he had two children. His brother in law, Viktor Radus-Zenkovich, was Chairmen of the Council of People's Commissars, Kyrgyz ASSR, Russian SFSR, from 12 October 1920 to 1921.

== Personality ==
Arthur Ransome described Nogin as "an extremely capable, energetic Russian, so capable, indeed, that I found it hard to believe he could really be a Russian."

== Positions held ==
Some of the Bolshevik party and government positions held by Viktor Nogin are listed below:

- Executive Committee of the Moscow Soviet of Workers' Deputies (before 1917)
- Central Committee member at the Sixth Congress of the RSDLP (July – August 1917)
- People's Commissar for Trade and Industry in the first cabinet of the Council of People's Commissars at the Second All-Russia Congress of Soviets
- Chairman of the Moscow Soviet of Workers' Deputies, succeeding Menshevik L.M. Khinchuk, who resigned (5 September 1917)
- Head of Moscow as Chairman of the Presidium of the Executive Committee of the Moscow Soviet of Workers' Deputies (19 September 1917 – 13 November 1917)
- Labor commissar of the Moscow Region and a deputy to the Constituent Assembly (17 November 1917)
- Deputy People's Commissar of Labor of the Russian Soviet Federative Socialist Republic (April 1918)

== Legacy ==
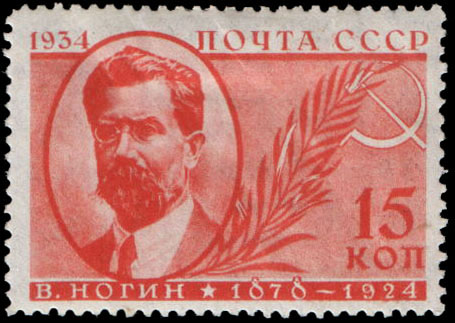
1934 Soviet commemorative stamp of Viktor Nogin

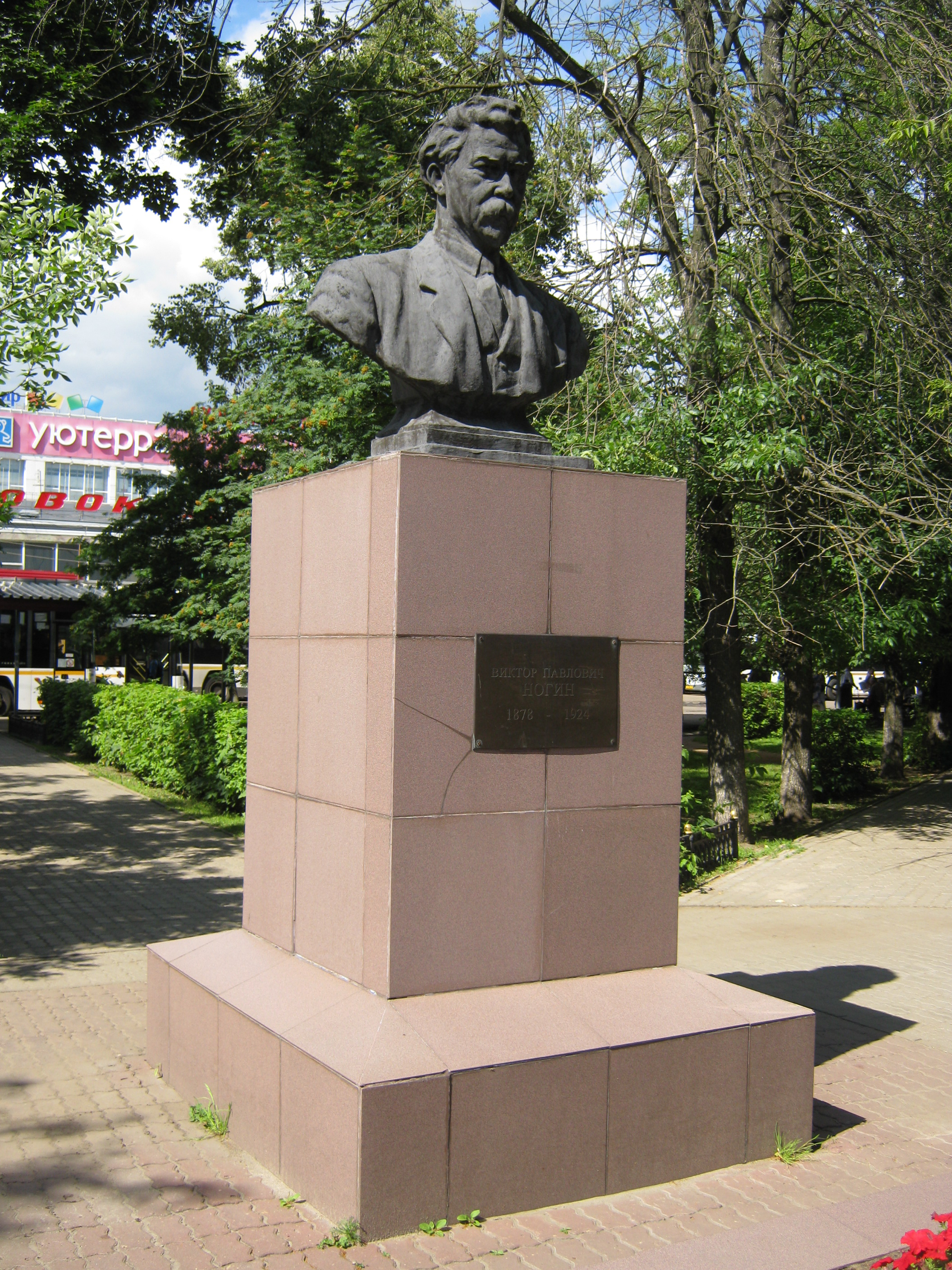
Monument to Viktor Nogin in the city of Noginsk

The historic 14th-century town of Bogorodsk was renamed Noginsk after him in 1930. In 1934, the USSR Post Office produced a 15 Kopeck stamp honoring Viktor Nogin. A station in the Moscow Metro Kitay-Gorod was called Ploshchad Nogina until 1990, after a square in central Moscow that was renamed after Viktor Nogin in 1924 (now also reverted to the old name of Slavyanskaya Square). Streets named after Nogin still exist in many Russia cities, such as in Saint Petersburg, Nizhniy Novgorod, Volgograd, Novosibirsk, Pavlovskiy Posad, Samara, and Serpukhov.

== See also ==
- Rabocheye Znamya

Political offices
Preceded by Vadim Rudnev	Mayor of Moscow; September–November, 1917	Succeeded by Mikhail Pokrovsky
