= 6th Congress of the Russian Social Democratic Labour Party (Bolsheviks) =

Summer 1917 meeting in Petrograd

The 6th Congress of the Russian Social Democratic Labour Party (bolsheviks) was held during 26 July – 3 August (N.S. 8–16 August) 1917 in Petrograd, Russia. It elected the 6th Central Committee. This was the first Congress of the Bolsheviks following their 1912 split from the Russian Social Democratic Labour Party (RSDLP). The previous, 5th Congress (1907) was the last congress of the united RSDLP (with both Bolsheviks and Mensheviks attending). The Mensheviks held their own Congress few weeks later, also in Petrograd.

Because during the congress, Vladimir Lenin and Grigory Zinoviev were in hiding, the congress was led by Joseph Stalin and Yakov Sverdlov as was its speaker. Lenin, Zinoviev, Trotsky, Kamenev, Kollontai and Lunacharsky, who were in hiding or in prison, were elected in absentia to the honorary presidium of the congress.

Held semi-legally in between the February Revolution and October Revolution, this was the first congress to take place in Russia since the initial congress and the last not to be held in Moscow. The party merged with the Mezhraiontsy.

Presidium of the 6th Congress of the RSDLP(b)

Delegates at the 6th Congress of the RSDLP(b)

Delegates at the 6th Congress of the RSDLP(b)

== See also ==
- July Days
