= Women in Partido Obrero de Unificación Marxista =

Women in the Workers' Party of Marxist Unification were faced with many of the same problems as other Communist and Anarchist women in the 1930s, such as hypocrisy of the male leadership in their support of women's rights, while continuing their sexist and patriarchal behavior in private.

During the Spanish Civil War, POUM women served in many important roles including POUM governance, POUM militias, writing and publishing POUM-affiliated publications, and serving as teachers among the civilian population. Despite POUM having one of the smallest contingents of women among any leftist organizations, women played an important role in the organization's militias. POUM was unique in that it was the only organization that had not only accepted women but had provided them with weapons training. The group was eventually outlawed, and the May Days events of 1937 saw many POUM women imprisoned or forced into exile.

POUM-affiliated women continued to be excluded after the Civil War. In exile, some POUM women were once again imprisoned. During World War II, the American Nancy MacDonald worked to assist Spanish POUM exiles and refugees in France and elsewhere around the globe.

== Second Spanish Republic (1931 - 1937) ==
=== Founding ===
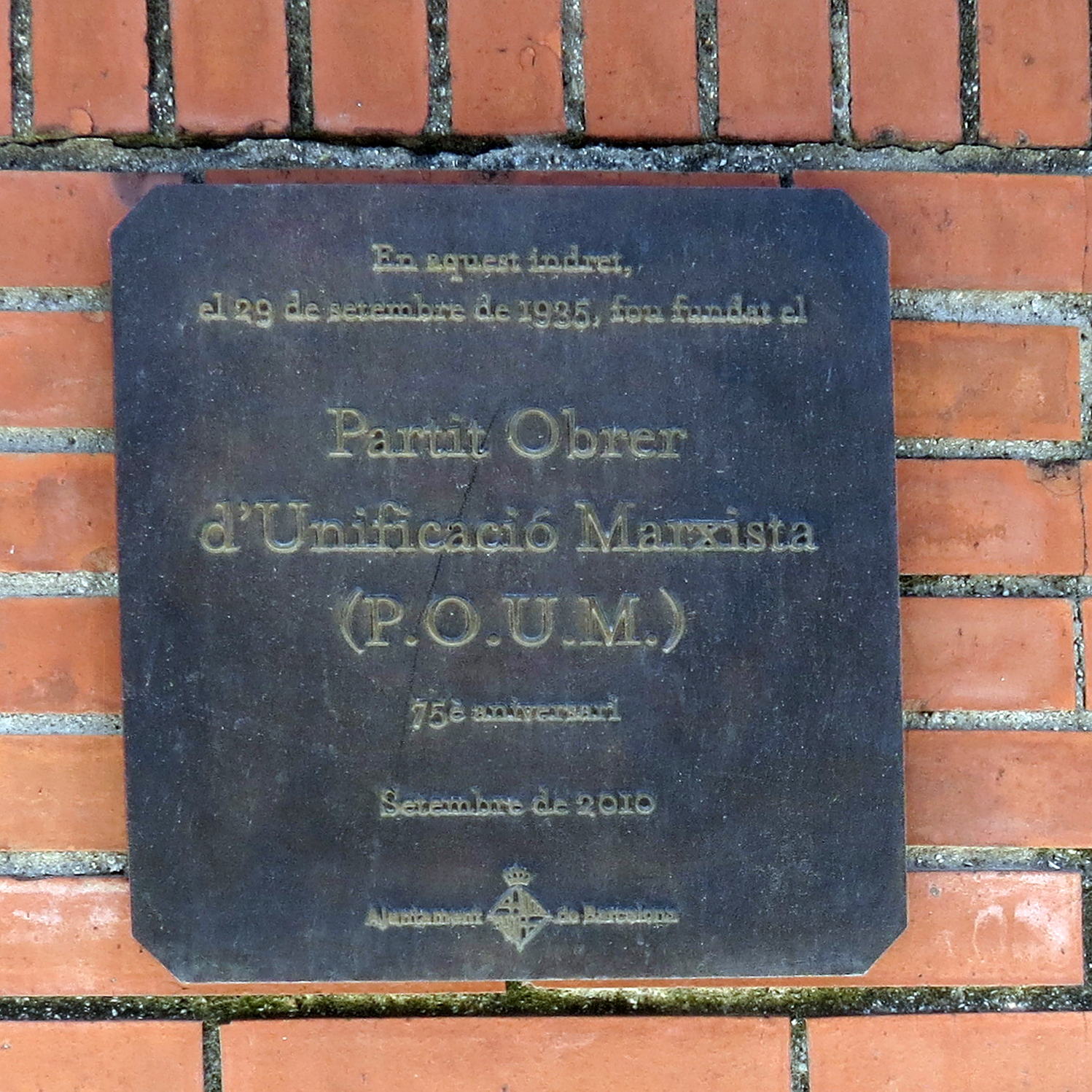
A plaque commemorating the location where POUM was founded on Calle Montserrat de Casanovas.

The Second Republic formally came into existence on 14 April 1931. With it would come a number of rights for women, including the right to vote. Partido Obrero de Unificación Marxista (POUM) was founded in September 1935. POUM came out as a result of the merger of Izquierda Comunista de España (ICE) and Bloque Obrero y Campesino (BOC), representing Trotskyist factions in the anarchist and communist movements. It was led by Andreu Nin, Joaquín Maurín and Juan Andrade. It saw its greatest support in Catalonia, where BOC had already developed a large support organization. As dissenting communists, they would soon find themselves in conflict with the Communist Party of Spain, and CNT who saw them as potential rivals. Inside POUM, Federica Montseny quickly became the Anarchist counterpart to the Communist Stalinist Dolores Ibárrui.

=== Political activity ===
Partido Obrero de Unificación Marxista was the dissident communist party during this late Second Republic and Civil War period. Their engagement for women involved trying to create specific female sub-organizations for them to join. They were primarily active in Catalonia. One of POUM's goals during the early part of the Second Republic was to give working-class women a feeling of empowerment. To do this, the Women's Secretariat set about organizing neighborhood women's committees to address day-to-day concerns of women living in specific areas.

Known as the Women's Cultural Grouping in Barcelona, POUM's women's group also organized classes in Barcelona attracting hundreds of women participants. Classes focused on hygiene, knitting, sewing, reading books, children's welfare and discussing a broad range of topics including socialist priorities, women's rights, and the origin of religious and social identities. POUM's Women's Secretariat also trained women in cities like Barcelona in using weapons. They wanted women to feel prepared for the war that seemed inevitable.

Women in POUM often had to deal with rank hypocrisy by revolutionary and leftist men, and men from POUM more specifically on the political and government side of the Second Republic and Civil War. While supporting reforms like divorce, gender-neutral clothing, and women's involvement on the front, these men would often have a wife back home and a mistress on the front, while also eschewing revolutionary apparel in favor of a suit and a tie. Even before the Communist purge in the government and in militias that peaked with the May Days in Barcelona in 1937, POUM's male leadership would advocate for women on the front, even as they encouraged women off it. Contacts took place in this period between POUM's Alfredo Martínez and leadership in Mujeres Libres in Madrid about possibly forming an alliance. These talks never went anywhere.

Swiss journalist Clara Ensner, along with her companion Pavel Thalmaen, arrived in Barcelona in June 1936, shortly before the start of the war. They quickly became involved in journalism activities in support of POUM. Much later, they would controversially write about their experiences because of the many false statements found within them.

== Spanish Civil War (1936 - 1939) ==
POUM women served on the front, but were also engaged in many other important roles, including POUM governance, writing POUM-affiliated publications, and serving as teachers among the civilian population. POUM members in Madrid at times feared the domination of anarchists in Barcelona. This caused some internal conflicts within the group. They also had to deal fears of more bourgeois elements in society of the revolutionary nature of the Civil War, and what that would mean in the long term. Katia Landau arrived in Spain from France, with the purpose of supporting POUM in the media against slanders by Stalinist Communists. The 1938 Les Stalinienes en Espagne pamphlet published in Paris was her most important contribution in this regard. Lois Orr served in the POUM female militia in Barcelona in the early part of the war. Orr left POUM to work for the Catalan Regional Government Office of Propaganda. Mary Low organized a women's POUM militia. She also edited Spanish Revolution, an English language POUM newspaper. Soon after, Low fled to Cuba. Female Stalinists actively participated in POUM and Trotskyite purges in Barcelona. Women like Teresa Pàmies and Dolores Ibárruri intentionally excluded POUM-affiliated women even as they tried to build bridges with PSOE. Pàmies would also be responsible for isolating POUM's youth organization, Juventudes Comunistas Ibéricas, in such a way that it would leave blood on her hands. Teresa Pàmies' exclusion of POUM is notable as her cousins were part of the organization, and she considered them committed anti-Fascists. Ibárruri set out to destroy POUM. In June 1937, the Franco regime and the Communists in control of Republican areas both declared POUM illegal, leading to the dissolution of the group.

=== Women in Combat ===
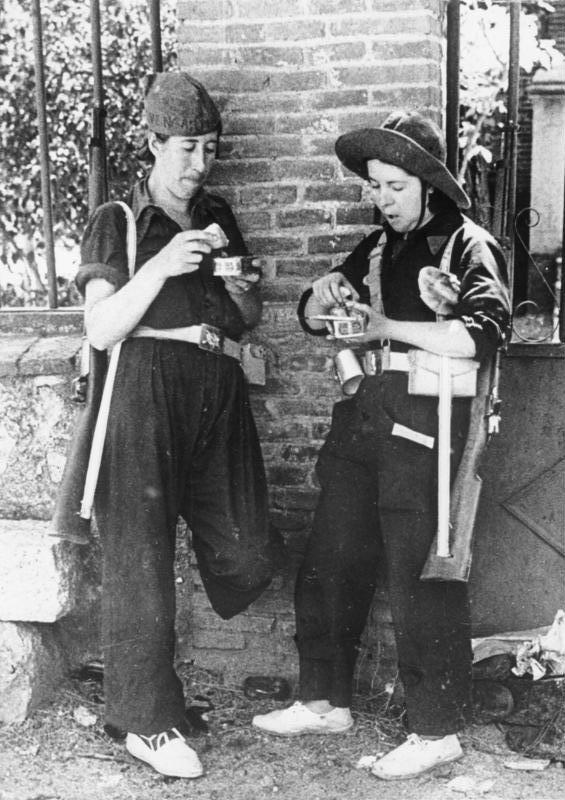
Milicianas with their weapons during the Spanish Civil War.

Of all the political groups on the Republican front, communist and anarchist columns attracted the most women. POUM attracted women fighters, but in smaller numbers. Partido Socialista Obrero Español (PSOE) was one of the only major actors on the left to reject the idea of women participating in combat as it was too radical for them. They believed women should serve as heroes at home, providing support to civilian populations well behind the front lines. Those women members of PSOE who found their way to combat did so by joining communist, anarchist and socialist youth organized columns like those of POUM.

Most of the women serving in front line roles had their positions defined by the communist, anarchist or POUM leadership, generally giving women equal roles when it came to combat, and providing the same military contribution. Combat experience did not significantly differ based on the political affiliation of the battalion that women in combat were attached to.

POUM initially required both men and women in combat to engage in support roles as needed. Women were in the trenches and stood guard. Captain Fernando Saavedra of the Sargento Vázquez Battalion said these women fought just like men. POUM had a column that included milicianas in the Mallorca campaign. POUM was the only organization that had accepted women and provided them with weapons training. The lack of weapons training by women in other militias would later be used as a reason to try to remove them from the front, even as those militias also failed to prove their male recruits with weapons training.

Argentine-born transnational anarchist Mika Etchebehere served in a POUM militia during the Civil War. A self-described Trotskyist, Etchebehere moved to Madrid from Paris a few days before the outbreak of the War, enlisting immediately and then being deployed as part of the Hipólito Etchebere column to the front near Madrid. By September, Etchebehere had become a commander after her own commander was lost in battle. Mika Feldman de Etchebéhère was among those at the Cathedral. She was one of the approximately one third of people who fled who survived. Her bravery during the Siege of Sigüenza earned her a promotion to POUM's Lenin Battalion Second Company Captain. After recovering from the siege in Barcelona, she was ordered to Moncloa, where she was in charge of a special shock troop brigade. Etchebehere survived the Civil War, hiding in Spain for several months following its conclusion before sneaking over the border and into France.

POUM milicianas in Madrid during the siege in March 1937 were prohibited from taking up arms by the Communist-organized La Pasionaria column. These women were instead required to cook and do laundry for men serving on the Madrid front.

After women were told to leave the front in March 1937, feminists in PSUC and POUM responded by changing their messaging, either suggesting women should be deployed on the home front or that women had a different role to play than men during times of war.

=== May Days of 1937 ===
In the lead up to the May Days events, Communists aligned with the Soviet Union had largely taken control of Spain's ports, where most of the support materials and relief aid coming in for distribution around the country were from the Soviet Union. They soon became a de facto police force, and were already working to undermine anarchists. On 1 May 1937, thousands of armed anarchists took to the streets of Madrid, daring the government and police to disarm them. Open conflict started on 3 May in front of the Telefónica building. On 4 May, Madrid had come to a complete work stoppage, with machine guns appearing in placements along the major streets in the city. By the conclusion of major fighting on 8 May, over 1,000 people had died and another 1,500 were wounded. The POUM leadership saw it all come to a tragic head on 16 June 1937 when Andrés Nin and the POUM executive were arrested. The next day, foreign POUM members and supporters were arrested en masse at the Hotel Falcon and taken to prison. Eventually, many foreigners in the group were rescued, thanks in part to the journalist George Tioli. Informed of their imprisonment by Tioli, the US Consulate worked to secure the release of Cusick and Orr.

The May Days events involved a number of POUM affiliated women. Nurse Teresa Rebull was among them. Her involvement led to punishment, which was part of the reason she subsequently fled Spain. Lois Orr was also involved in the Barcelona May Days. Lois Cusick was caught up in the May Day events. Cusick and her companion's apartment at Avinguda Republica d'Argentina 2 was raided and the pair were arrested along with other POUM foreigners in the area like Katia Landau. The raid was conducted by a Russian and three plainclothes policemen affiliated with the guardias de asalto. As night fell, they were marched through the blacked out streets of Barcelona to Portal de l'Angel, 24. Eventually they were rescued in part because of the actions of the journalist George Tioli. With assistance from the United States Consul Mahlon Perkins, informed of the imprisonment thanks to Tioli, her group, which included Orr, Cusick and Landau, was released on 1 July. Two days later, they departed Spain aboard a ship bound for France.

== Francoist Spain (1938 - 1973) ==
In the immediate postwar period, the Second World Youth Peace Conference was held at Vassar College in the United States in 1938. While most of the leftist factions of Spain were represented, POUM was deliberately excluded following efforts to isolate and dismantle them by Stalinist Communists during the May Days events.

A number of women had been imprisoned for a second time as a result of lingering distrust and active persecution of communists and anarchists in France during World War II. Their first prison sentences had often been in Spanish prisons, jailed by either Nationalist forces or Communists. Following the end of the Civil War, during World War II, American Nancy MacDonald worked to assist Spanish POUM exiles and refugees in France and elsewhere around the globe. She created the organization Spanish Refugee Aid, which served as a larger umbrella organization to coordinate efforts with anti-Stalinist groups to assist former POUM members.

During the later parts of the war and at its conclusion, some women from POUM were coerced into making false confessions in Moscow courtrooms, and then sent to Soviet prisons. Their major crime was being Trotskyites. It was only during the 1950s and 1960s that some of those women involved with POUM and Trotskyite purges began to re-evaluate their role in them; their change of heart occurred only after Stalinist Communism lost its prestige among leftist circles.
