= Juan Andrade =

Spanish communist, journalist, politician and editor

- Juan Andrade Rodríguez
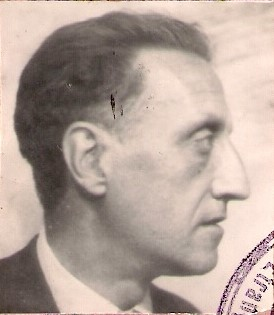
- Born: February 3, 1898
- Died: May,1st, 1981; Madrid

Juan Andrade Rodriguez (Madrid, February 3, 1898 – May 1, 1981) was a Spanish communist, journalist, politician and editor.

== Biography ==
By profession, Andrade was a government employee at the Ministry of Finance and began his political career in his teens upon joining at 14 the youth wing of the Radical Republican Party. After a few years, at the age of 16, he joined a group of socialist students and began his militancy in the Socialist Youth of Spain (Juventudes Socialistas de España; JSE), the youth organization associated with the Spanish Socialist Workers' Party (Partido Socialista Obrero Español; PSOE). In 1919, he took over as editor of Renovacion, the official weekly newspaper of the JSE. He was a known supporter of the Bolshevik Revolution and the Communist International, and collaborated from 1917 with Nuestra Palabra, a weekly pro-Communist journal, to print articles in Renovacion that were more left-leaning than the doctrines of the PSOE.

Andrade was an active participant in the April 15, 1920, founding of the Spanish Communist Party, created by the JSE (which continued, in an initially smaller form). Andrade was elected a founding member of the new party's Executive Committee, and became inaugural editor of its official newspaper, El Comunista. A similar schism of the PSOE occurred a year later, in April 1921, leading to the creation of the Spanish Communist Workers' Party; the new parties merged in November to create the Communist Party of Spain (Partido Comunista de España; PCE). Andrade was elected member of the PCE Central Committee and director of the new party's weekly journal, La Antorcha. He carried out these responsibilities until 1927. In that year, he was expelled from the PCE for allegedly supporting the ideas of the Left Opposition, which was under the charge of Leon Trotsky. From then he would be a driving force of the reorganization of the Spanish Trotskyists, with the foundation of the Communist Left of Spain in 1930. He ran the party's journal, Comunismo, from 1931 to 1934, when it was suspended by the government after their defeat in the October Revolution of 1934.

He married María Teresa García Banús in 1929, known after their marriage as Teresa Andrade, communist activist, translator and publisher.

After the merging of the Communist Left with the Workers and Peasants' Bloc, which created the Workers' Party of Marxist Unification (POUM) in 1935, Andrade was elected member of the Central Committee and became one of the driving forces and main writers of La Batalla, a journal run by Joaquín Maurín. Many founders of Spanish communism, including Maurin and the very own Andrade, met again at the POUM such as Andreu Nin, Julian Gorkin, Luis Portela and Daniel Rebull, among others.

At the beginning of the Spanish Civil War in 1936, Andrade moved to Barcelona and joined the Executive Committee of the POUM. During this stage, marked by the social revolution, he founded the Editorial Marxista, and specialized in socialization and planned economy. After the Barcelona May Days in 1937 and the banning of the POUM, he was arrested on June 16, 1937, and remained in prison until the end of 1938, after being tried and convicted for taking part in the events.

After the end of the conflict in 1939 and the defeat of the Republic, he was exiled in France. There, he was arrested again in 1940 by the Vichy regime and the Gestapo, and convicted for supporting the French Resistance against Nazism. In August 1944, he was freed by a French Resistance commando team led by the leader of the POUM, Wilebaldo Solano. He afterwards joined in Toulouse POUM reorganization activities. During his exile, he collaborated with La Batalla and other publications, and organized a Spanish service against Nazism in France.

He went back to Spain in August 1978 and died in Madrid on May 1, 1981.

== Works ==
He was editor of the newspaper El Sol, as well as founder and director of the publishing houses Cenit, Hoy and Oriente, which published Marxist works such as The Accumulation of Capital, by Rosa Luxemburg and Charles Marx, and by Franz Mehring; as well as Russian and American avant-garde literature. Notable among his works are China against imperialism, The reforming bureaucracy in the working class movement, Notes for a PCE story, Personal memoirs and Notes about the Civil War.
