= Carlota Durany =

Catalan communist activist (1900–1945)

- Born: Carlota Durany Vives; 1900; Barcelona, Catalonia, Spain
- Died: 1945 (aged 44–45); Buenos Aires, Argentina
- Occupations: Secretary, journalist
- Years active: 1930–1937
- Political party: Workers' Party of Marxist Unification (1935–1939)
- Other political affiliations: Workers' and Peasants' Bloc (1931); Communist Left of Spain (1931–1935)
- Movement: Communism
- Spouse: Francesc de Cabo
- Father: Jaume Durany y Ballera

Carlota Durany Vives (1900–1945) was a Catalan communist activist. Born into a Carlist family, she gravitated towards left-wing politics and became secretary to the Catalan Trotskyist leader Andreu Nin. After a brief period in the Workers' and Peasants' Bloc (BOC) and the National Confederation of Labour (CNT), she joined Nin's Communist Left of Spain (ICE), becoming a leading figure for the party after it was forced underground during the Black Biennium. She co-founded the Workers' Party of Marxist Unification (POUM) and was active in the party during the Spanish Civil War, for which she was imprisoned following the May Days of 1937. After the fall of Barcelona, she fled to Argentina, where she died at the end of World War II.

== Biography ==
Carlota Durany Vives was born in Barcelona in 1900. She was born into an upper middle class family from La Pobla de Segur, which had named her "Carlota" following the Carlist tradition. She was the daughter of Jaume Durany, an engineer, freemason and a member of the Radical Republican Party, who went on to work as a teacher at Francesc Ferrer's Modern School. Her father ensured she received a secular education.

As she grew up, Durany became involved in left-wing politics, going to work as secretary to the communist politician Andreu Nin in 1930. Nin took her under his wing, believing she had the substance to become a "great activist", and she accompanied him to several meetings of the incipient communist left. She considered joining the Communist Party of Spain (PCE), but she immediately left its headquarters in Barcelona after discovering it to be, as she put it, closer to a Salvation Army homeless shelter than the offices of a political party. She instead joined the Workers' and Peasants' Bloc (BOC) and the Commercial Workers' Union of the National Confederation of Labour (CNT). She organised strike actions in the union's executive committee, and in August 1931, she formed the Revolutionary Syndicalist Opposition, which aimed to bring the union under communist influence. The anarcho-syndicalists of the CNT attempted to bring her over to their side, but when she refused to join them, they denounced her as an agent of "Marxist dictatorship".

Following the formation of the Second Spanish Republic, in November 1931, she left the Bukharinist BOC and joined Nin's Communist Left of Spain (ICE), a Trotskyist formation. She was the only woman activist known to have been a member of this party in Barcelona. She contributed to the party's publication El Soviet and helped to distribute it and read it aloud at factories. She also married fellow ICE activist Francesc de Cabo. On 30 May 1932, she was arrested for her political activities, along with 20 other party members, although she was later released without explanation. Her health soon began to deteriorate, forcing her to move away from street activism. During the Black Biennium, the ICE moved underground and she turned her home into a parallel headquarters for the party. There she produced the party's interior bulletins and established a shelter for party activists fleeing the authorities. On 29 September 1935, at a meeting of BOC and ICE members at her home, she co-founded the Workers' Party of Marxist Unification (POUM), which united the two parties. She formed the Women's Secretariat of the POUM, together with Teresa Andrade.

After the outbreak of the Spanish Civil War, she returned to public activism, writing for the POUM newspaper Emancipación. In the paper, she wrote articles advocating for sexual freedom and arguing against "revolutionary puritanism". She believed that women's role in the Spanish Revolution of 1936 was to transmit a revolutionary spirit of class consciousness and collective responsibility to future generations. Following the May Days of 1937, Durany sheltered Austrian Trotskyist Kurt Landau until he was arrested and murdered by Soviet agents. Durany herself was arrested three times and threatened with death, as Checa agents attempted to force her to give up her husband. She was imprisoned in Les Corts until the fall of Barcelona to the Nationalists in 1939. While she was imprisoned, her father had been killed in the bombing of Barcelona on 17 March 1938. Durany hid her political affiliations from the new authorities and was released, allowing her to flee to Buenos Aires, Argentina. She died there in 1945, having suffered a heart attack after hearing news of the Allied victory in World War II.

== Bibliography ==
- Gutiérrez-Álvarez, Pepe (2006). "Carlota Durany Vives: Del Carlismo al Trotskismo". Retratos poumistas (in Spanish). Seville: Espuela de Plata. pp. 118–123. ISBN 978-84-96956-60-5.
- Marin Silvestre, Dolors (1 January 2010). "Carlota Durany Vives". Diccionari Biogràfic de Dones (in Catalan). Xarxa Vives d'Universitats.
- "Carlota Durany: Les dones dins el comunisme català". Lluitadors (in Catalan). January 2009.
