= Women in POUM in Francoist Spain =

Women in POUM in Francoist Spain were few as many, along with male dominated leadership, were forced into exile following the end of the Spanish Civil War. Those in exile often felt isolated and alone. Those who remained were sometimes sent to prison. POUM women participated in a hunger strike at Madrid's Las Ventas prison in 1946. The group fell by the wayside as Partido Comunista de España became the pre-dominant resistance organization in Spain. The organization finally dissolved during the 1950s in Toulouse, France with its memory kept alive by the wife of its last president, María Teresa Carbone, through the Fundació Andreu Nin .

== Background ==
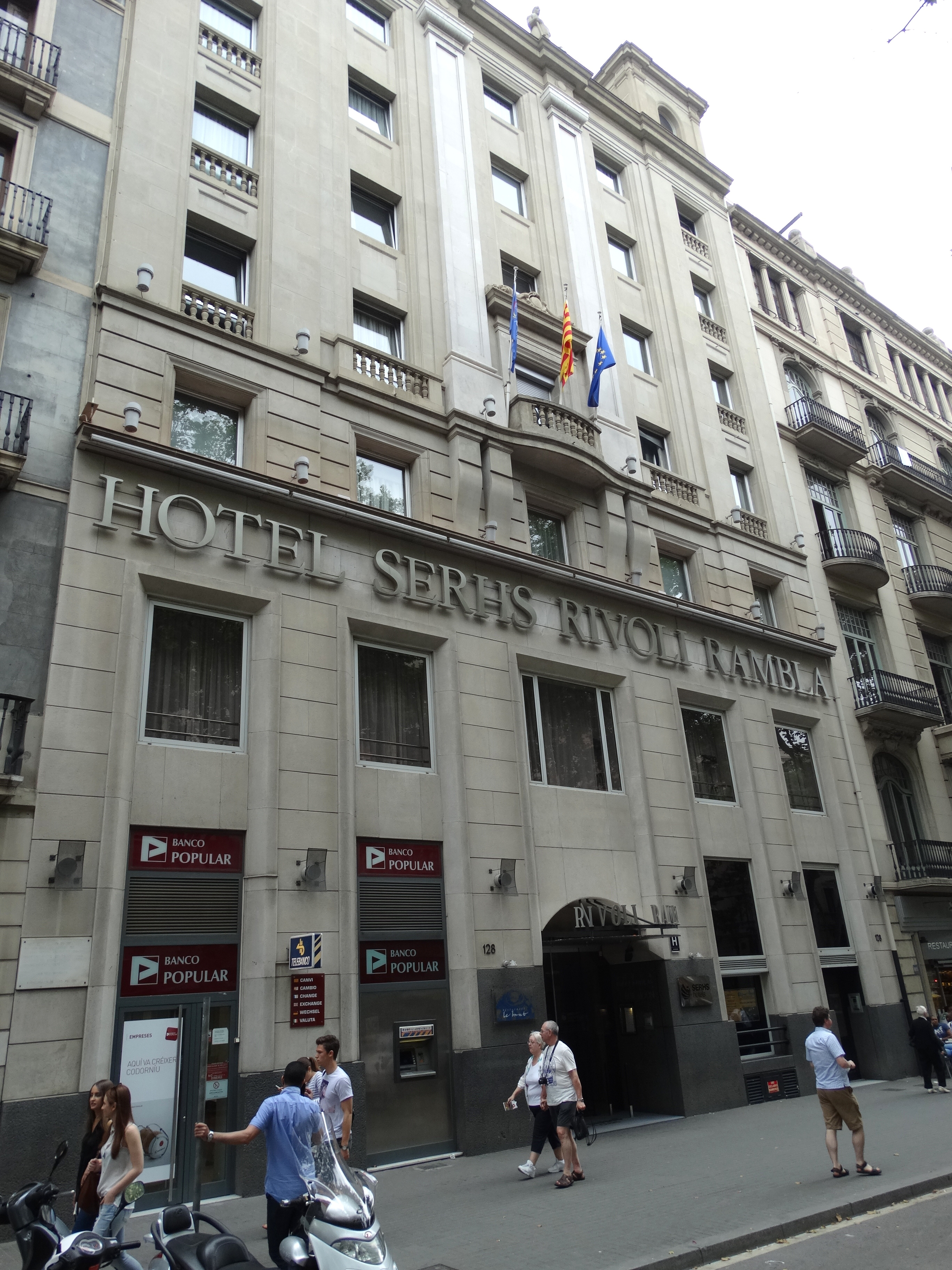
Hotel Rivoli Rambla : Former POUM Headquarters in Barcelona.

Francoist Spain was a pseudo-fascist state whose ideology rejected what it considered the inorganic democracy of the Second Republic. It was an embrace of organic democracy, defined as a reassertion of traditional Spanish Roman Catholic values that served as a counterpoint to the Communism of the Soviet Union during the same period. It came into exist in 1939 following the end of the Spanish Civil War. Misogyny and heteronormativity where linchpins of fascism in Spain, where the philosophy revolved around patria and fixed gender roles that praised the role of strong male leadership.

In July 1936, the Spanish Civil War started with a military coup attempt launched from the Spanish enclave of Melilla. In October of that same year, Franco took over as the Generalissimo and Chief of State in Nationalist zones. On 19 April 1937, Catholic and Falangist parties were merged, making Falange Española Tradicionalista the official state party behind Nationalist lines. On 30 January 1938, the first National State Cabinet meeting was held, with the Spanish Civil War formally coming to an end on 1 April 1939 and an official government formalized on 8 August 1939.

The Franco regime banned all political parties and trade unions. The only permissible type of organization was Falange, founded by José Antonio Primo de Rivera in 1933. An election was held in 1966, where people were given the option to affirm or deny Franco's leadership. With more voters than electors, Franco was affirmed as Head of State. Prince Juan Carlos was appointed as Franco's official successor in 1970, with Admiral Luis Carrero Blanco being the unofficial successor. Carrero Blanco was assassinated in 1973 by ETA. Franco died in November 1975.

== Party history ==
Workers Party of Marxist Unification (POUM) was founded on 29 September 1935 in Barcelona as a result of mergers of the Bloque Obrero y Campesino and Izquierda Comunista. They would find support from many inside the anarchist union, CNT. By mid-1936 and through to 1938, Spanish communist found itself in internal conflict between Stalinist and Trotskyites, with PCE lining up behind Stalin and POUM supporting Trotsky. The Russian backed Stalinist PCE started purging left-wing Trotskyites in the during the Civil War, culminating in the May Days of 1937 purges in Barcelona and the overthrow of Prime Minister Largo Caballero. POUM was damaged by these events, but did not disappear. Instead, members went into hiding until the end of the war and continued to publish La Batalla and Juventud Obrera.

Most of POUM's leadership were in Republican prisons in Barcelona near the end of the Civil War at the hands of PCE who acted at the behest of the Soviet Union. Some managed to escape to exile in France, but thousands were stuck in concentration camps. Later, they were accused of opposing the French government and some were sent to German concentration camps. After the end of World War II, POUM constituted itself legally abroad. El Combatiente Rojo was published by POUM starting in 1939. It was one of several publications produced by POUM militants in the decade after the Civil War.

== Women's history ==
POUM all but disappeared in Spain at the end of the Spanish Civil War, with PCE and PSOE being more successful at re-organizing. Women affiliated with POUM found themselves imprisoned following the conclusion of the Spanish Civil War. Most of the resistance in Spain during the early Franco period was a result of guerrillas, who coordinated their activities in the interior both with political militants in exile and with militants in prison. Most of Spain's militant women who remained in Spain were in prison or had gone underground where they served as important figures in coordinating activities between all three groups. Prisons in this case proved invaluable for many militant women as they allowed them to rebuild their activist networks or create new networks. They were also one of the biggest sources of female resistance to the Franco regime by exercising daily resistance behind prison walls. Águeda Campos Barrachina was one of POUM women imprisoned during the Franco regime as a result of her involvement with the group during the Civil War. In 1946, women political prisoners in Madrid's Las Ventas prison held a hunger strike to protest the poor quality of food they were provided. Women from socialist, communist and anarchist organizations came together behind bars to coordinate the strike. While they were successful in seeing food quality improved, prison officials subsequently reorganized the prison population to prevent further political collaboration within the confines of the prison.

Anarchist ideas about abortion in the early Francoist period were informed by opinions exemplified by Director of General Health and Social Assistance of the Generalitat of Catalonia Félix Martí Ibáñez during the Civil War, with a policy called "Eugenics Reform" that included support of abortion by removing it as a clandestine practice. Their policies also included support of working-class women, by attempting to provide them with economic relief so elective abortions were not needed. During the Civil War, the only women's anti-fascist group to support the legalization of abortion was POUM. Mujeres Libres never mentioned abortion nor contraception. Support of policies in favor of legalization consequently largely were made by leftist men. Women did not see abortion as part of a policy of women's liberation.

During the later parts of the war and at its conclusion, some women from POUM were coerced into making false confessions in Moscow courtrooms, and then sent to Soviet prisons. Their major crime was being Trotskyites. It was only during the 1950s and 1960s that some of those women involved with POUM and Trotskyite purged began to re-evaluate their role in them; their change of hearts only occurred after Stalinist Communism lost its prestige among leftist circles.

Many of those affiliated with POUM went into exile. Mika Etchebéhère was a POUM militant who went into exile in Argentina following the war. In a letter to friended in the United States, she said of her experiences, "Sometimes, it seems to me that as long as life is this dreadful quagmire that drowns us, how many efforts we make to try to live normally will not be of any use. To live, to hold onto the light, to enjoy the sun, to eat every day, to read books, to what extent all this seems to be wished, forced. Deep down, you feel that you do not live, that you are vegetating, that you are floating." In another letter, she said, "The beings that I love the most have died or are absent and I see this strange fact: I live increasingly away from the beings that surround me, and I take refuge in memories, in the past. I can not find a place in reality. I'm constantly upset, hurt. Beings and things that I endured perfectly before, now make me nervous and exasperate me to a point that I came to believe myself seriously sick with nerves. The effort that I do to improve myself exhausts me, and I end up shutting myself up with books and memories. Anyway, I'm not worth much lately. However, I hope that one day I will get better." Other POUM women militants in exile expressed similar feelings of isolation and being torn apart inside.

María Teresa Carbonell married the last POUM President Wilebaldo Solano in the 1950s. She assisted him in running POUM's headquarters in Toulouse. She later helped found Fundació Andreu Nin in order to keep the legacy of POUM alive.
