= Charles Orr (socialist) =

American economist and socialist

Charles Andrew Orr (November 15, 1906 – August 15, 1999) was an American economist and socialist.

== Early life ==
Orr was born in North Branch, Michigan, on November 15, 1906. He received a Ph.D. in economics from the University of Michigan. Between 1929 and 1930 he was a statistical clerk for the League of Nations in 1929–1930.

== Career ==
He and his wife, Lois Orr, lived in Barcelona during the Spanish Civil War, where they supported the Workers' Party of Marxist Unification (POUM). They survived the Stalinist attack on the POUM in June 1937, after the fighting of the Barcelona May Days. They were arrested on 17 June, the day after Andrés Nin and the POUM executive were arrested, but were released on 1 July and placed by the US consul, Mahlon Perkins, on a ship bound for Marseilles on 3 July.

They were in Mexico in 1940 when Leon Trotsky was murdered.

As an economist, he was focused on the study of labor. He worked at UNESCO while in Paris. He was a lecturer at several American universities, including Webster College in Geneva, and University of Cardiff in Wales.

== Legacy ==
Collections of his papers are held at the Walter Reuther Library, Wayne State University and Stanford University. Some elements of Orr's writings are also held within the Labadie Collection at the University of Michigan.

== Works ==
- Stalin's slave camps: an indictment of modern slavery (1951)
- Jobs versus people: workers' education guide to population problems (1974)

== See also ==
- Lois Orr
- Spanish Civil War
- POUM
