= Iberian Communist Federation =

Catalan-Balear Communist Federation Federació Comunista Catalano-Balear
- Leader: Joaquim Maurín
- Founded: 1926
- Dissolved: November 1930
- Newspaper: La Batalla
- Youth wing: Iberian Communist Youth
- Ideology: Communism
- Political position: Far-Left

La Batalla, the official newspaper of the FCCB.

Catalan-Balear Communist Federation (in Catalan: Federació Comunista Catalano-Balear) was a communist group in Spain. Formed in 1924, it joined the Communist Party of Spain (PCE), and functioned as the PCE federation in Catalonia and the Balearic Islands. Its most prominent leader was Joaquim Maurín, and its main organ was La Batalla ("The Battle").

== History ==
In 1930, FCCB broke away from PCE, being replaced by the Communist Party of Catalonia as its new PCE local branch. The same year, the Catalan Communist Party merged into FCCB. The united FCCB launched the Workers and Peasants Bloc (BOC) as its mass front. FCCB became associated with the international Right Opposition.

In June 1933, FCCB changed name to Iberian Communist Federation (in Spanish: Federación Comunista Ibérica), and stated its intention to expand throughout Spain. In November 1935 FCI and BOC merged with the Trotskyist Communist Left of Spain and formed the Workers' Party of Marxist Unification (POUM).

The youth wing of FCI was Iberian Communist Youth (JCI).
