= Wilebaldo Solano =

Leader of the Workers' Party of Marxist Unification
- In office 1947–1980
- Preceded by: Julián Gorkin
- Succeeded by: position abolished

Personal details
- Born: July 7, 1916 Burgos, Spain
- Died: September 7, 2010 (aged 94) Barcelona, Spain
- Party: Workers' Party of Marxist Unification (1935–1980); Workers and Peasants' Bloc (1932–1935)
- Education: Universitat Autònoma de Barcelona

Wilebaldo Solano Alonso (7 July 1916, in Burgos, Spain – 7 September 2010, in Barcelona, Spain) was a Spanish Communist activist during the Spanish Civil War, especially noted for his work with Socialist youth organizations as a member of the Workers' Party of Marxist Unification (POUM). Most of his activities before and during the Second Spanish Republic were centered in Catalonia.

== Youth ==
Solano completed his secondary studies at the Institut Balmes, in Barcelona. He distinguished himself as a leader of the student movement, organizing his institute's first student group during the fall from power of General Miguel Primo de Rivera, and later founding the Catalan National Student Federation. Solano went on to study medicine at the Universitat Autònoma de Barcelona.

In 1932 he joined the youth wing of the Marxist Bloque Obrero y Campesino (BOC – Workers' and Peasants' Bloc) — a major workers' organization, at the time under the influence of the Soviet Union's Right Opposition, that would later fuse into the POUM — and began organizing the Association of Revolutionary Students of Barcelona. Solano became a member of the Executive Committee of the BOC Youth and initiated his journalistic career as a contributor to Adelante ("Forward"), a journal headed by Joaquín Maurín — a renowned Spanish communist who would go on to found the POUM with Andreu Nin.

== Civil War ==
Solano became secretary general of the JCI (Iberian Communist Youth) in September 1935, after having joined the POUM and spent time in Valencia as a delegate of the POUM's Executive Committee, where he helped found the weekly El Comunista (The Communist). After the eruption of the Spanish Civil War in 1936 Solano represented the JCI in the Executive Committee of the POUM and headed the weekly Juventud Comunista (Communist Youth). In November 1936 he was elected secretary general of the International Bureau of Revolutionary Socialist Youth.

Solano managed to escape from the clashes between the Unified Socialist Party of Catalonia and POUM on June 16, 1937. He helped found the second Executive Committee of the POUM with other fugitive poumistas. In harshly repressive conditions, this committee organized a resistance to the persecution of the POUM and an international campaign supporting Nin and other jailed leaders. During this period he edited the JCI's underground journal, Juventud Obrera (Working Youth).

In April 1938 he was detained along with other POUM leaders and placed in Barcelona State Prison by Communist-directed government authorities. He was to be included in the second trial of the POUM, which never occurred thanks to the fall of Barcelona to Nationalist forces. In February 1939, Solano entered France.

== Exile ==
Solano spent several months living in Paris and Chartres, and along with other poumistas attempted to reconstitute the Party, with an exile wing and one active inside Spain, and also maintain links with other organizations. In 1941, after Nazi Germany conquered and occupied France, Solano was detained in Montauban and condemned to twenty years of forced labor by a Vichy regime tribunal. He was freed on July 19, 1944 by the Maquis. He joined the French Resistance and, along with POUM and Confederación Nacional del Trabajo and militants founded a Spanish guerrilla unit, the Batallón Libertad (Liberty Battalion). In 1945 he left the Battalion to rededicate himself to organizing the POUM and reestablishing its newspaper, La Batalla ("The Battle").

In 1947, after a clandestine voyage to Madrid and Catalonia, Solano was elected secretary general of the POUM at the party's general conference in Toulouse, attended by representatives of the illegal Spanish organization as well as exile groups from France, North Africa, and Latin America.

During his exile, aside from editing La Batalla Solano founded Tribuno Socialista ("Socialist Tribune"), a magazine that secured a notable following in Spain in an epoch when the resistance to Francoist Spain reached hopeful peaks. Moreover, Solano participated in numerous international activities and, in particular, in the creation of the Socialist Movement for the United States of Europe, one of the first postwar Pan-European organizations (he attended the November 1948 meeting of its International Committee), and that of the Pro-socialist People's Congress, which brought together many of the African and Asian national liberation movements.

Professionally, Solano worked for Agence France Presse between 1953 and 1981. In 1975-76, when the POUM found itself in the midst of a crisis, he stood in opposition to the dissolution of the Party and its entrance into the camp of Social Democracy (the Spanish Socialist Workers' Party). He pushed for Tribuno Socialista to become the POUM's magazine, and expressed his support for the regroupment of revolutionary Marxist organizations.

== Later years ==
In the 1980s, he was one of the founders of the Fundació Andreu Nin, which focused on the total rectification of the prestige of that communist politician and the clarification of the mystery of his death at the hands of the NKVD, and at the same time the defense of revolutionary Marxism and dialogue with all the tendencies of the socialist labor movement. Solano is the author of a biography of Nin, a history of the JCI, and numerous essays on the POUM, the exile of Spanish revolutionaries in France, and the problems posed by the fall of the USSR and the collapse of Stalinism. He was a major advisor to and collaborator on films such as Ken Loach's Land and Freedom and the documentary Operación Nikolai.

1999 saw the release of Solano's book-length study of the POUM and Nin's role in the Spanish revolution, El POUM in la Historia. Andreu Nin y la revolución española. It was published jointly by Los Libros de la Catarata and the Fundació Andreu Nin, and is a personal and observed discussion of the poorly understood time period and political movement – some have called it one of the two most important works about the POUM, the other being Andy Durgan's study of the Bloque Obrero y Campesino, BOC 1930-1936. As yet neither work is available in English.

His personal archive is located in the Pavelló de la República CRAI Library - University of Barcelona. It consists of different documents, his writings, documents written by many political and cultural institutions and press clippings.
