= Communist Action =

Spanish leftist organization (1964–1978)

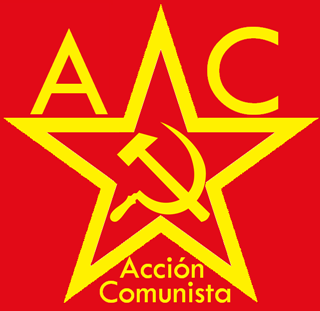
- Spanish name: Acción Comunista
- Catalan name: Acció Comunista
- Founded: 1964
- Dissolved: 1978
- Split from: Popular Liberation Front
- Headquarters: Madrid
- Newspaper: Acción Comunista
- Ideology: Communism; Luxemburgism; Libertarian socialism Council communism New Left
- Political position: Far-left

Communist Action (Spanish: Acción Comunista, Catalan: Acció Comunista) was a Marxist organisation in Spain founded in exile in 1964, during the Francoist State. The organisation produced a newspaper entitled Acción Comunista. Among its members were Carlos Semprún and José Antonio Ubierna. In 1970 AC came in contact with workerist organizations like UHP and CRAS (Comunas Revolucionarias de Acción Socialista). In 1976 some of its members, especially in Catalonia, joined the POUM.

AC was legalized in Spain in 1977. In the first democratic elections AC participated in the Front for Workers' Unity, with the Revolutionary Communist League (LCR), the Organization of Communist Left (OIC) and the POUM. After an unsuccessful process of merger with the POUM, AC held a congress of self-dissolution in 1978.

== Ideology ==
Communist Action was influenced by the English-speaking New Left, especially as expressed in the American journal, Studies on the Left, and the British journal, New Left Review.

AC didn't practice democratic centralism and was influenced by Situationism, Council communism and Luxemburgism. Among the most relevant authors for AC were: Clara Zetkin, Rosa Luxemburg, Otto Rühle, Andreu Nin, Alexandra Kollontai, Trotsky, Joaquim Maurín, Karl Korsch, Paul Mattick, Anton Pannekoek, Claude Lefort, Cornelius Castoriadis, and Guy Debord. AC was an eclectic party that did not aspire to be the vanguard of the working class, nor its "point of reference", but instead was a supporter of ideas such as "workers' democracy" and "self-management socialism".

There were rigid criteria for the selection of aspiring militants and it was necessary to go through an initiation process to gain admittance to the association.
