= Gerardus Johannes Geers =

Dutch linguist

Gerardus Johannes Geers (10 December 1891 in Delft – 2 May 1965 in Groningen), was a Dutch linguist and Hispanist. He wrote his thesis on the language of the Blackfoot Indians in North America but spent his career studying the Spanish language and Spanish culture.

In 1917 Geers travelled to Spain to become the governor of the children of the Dutch envoy in Madrid. He mingled in leftist intellectual circles and translated Das Kapital in Spanish. Under the pseudonym of Cayo Graco he published articles in socialist periodics like Nuestra Palabra and El Comunista. Despite his diplomatic immunity as part of the household of the envoy he was expelled from Spain for alleged "subversive activities".

Geers made a career as a teacher and became a pioneer of hispanismo in the Netherlands. He translated Miguel de Cervantes, Unamuno, Ortega y Gasset and Diez del Corral. As an hispanist he criticized the popular "Leyenda negra" and he defended King Philip II of Spain against the many accusations.

In "El problema de los romances" (1920) Geers denied the popular thesis of Milá y Fontanals en Menéndez Pelayo that the Spanish literary romances were descended from the Spanish epic works. Geers proposed that they stood in the tradition of the middle-Latin lyrics. Geers thesis was falsified by E. García Gómez in his article "La lírica hispano-árabe y la aparición de la lírica románica" (Al-Andalus, XXI (1956)) based on recently discovered kharga-material.

Geers became a professor of Hispanic studies in Groningen.
