= Arquer =

Arquer is a surname. Notable people with the surname include:

- Cristina Gómez Arquer (born 1968), Spanish handball player
- Jordi Arquer (1907–1981), Spanish politician and writer
