= Jordi Arquer =

Spanish politician and writer

Jordi Arquer

Jordi Arquer i Saltor (1907 – 1981) was a Spanish communist politician and writer from Catalonia.

== Biography ==
Arquer was born in Barcelona in 1907.

During the dictatorship of Miguel Primo de Rivera, he participated in the clandestine opposition, collaborating with the pro-Catalan independence groups of Francesc Macià. He was a part of the Centre Autonomista de Dependents del Comerç i de la Indústria and the newspaper Lluita. In 1927 he was one of the founders of the Círculo de Estudios Marxistas (Circle of Marxist Studies), and in 1928 participated in the clandestine congress of the Partit Comunista Català (Catalan Communist Party), which attracted Marxist militants from the Estat Català.

Once the Second Spanish Republic was proclaimed, Arquer was one of the founders of a Communist "Right Opposition" party, Bloc Obrer i Camperol (BOC), and an advocate of the Working Alliance (Aliança Obrera). In 1931 he published Los comunistas ante el problema de las nacionalidades ibéricas, and after reviewing the history of Catalonia and the Catalan movement, was favorable to the recognition of self-determination of Catalonia and indicated the convenience of a Union of Iberian Socialist Republics.

1n 1935, BOC merged with the Trotskyist Communist Left of Spain (Izquierda Comunista de España; ICE) to form POUM, bringing together communists dissatisfied with the other communist and socialist parties in Spain. During the Spanish Civil War (1936–1939), he was one of the organizers and heads of the POUM militia, which operated on the Aragon front.

Arquer went into exile in France in 1939. There he co-founded the Moviment Socialista de Catalunya (Catalan Socialist Movement). He continued to advocate for this organisation in publications and magazines such as Endavant, L'Insurgent, Quaderns de l'exili, La Nostra Revista (Mexico), Ressorgiment (Argentina), Germanor (Chile) and others, circulated in countries including the United States.

In 1977, Arquer moved back to Barcelona, where he resided until his death in 1981 in Perpignan.

== Works ==
- El Comunisme i la qüestió nacional i colonial (1930)
- Crítica del programa de Gotha (1936)
- De Francesc Pi i Margall al Comunisme (1931)
- Los comunistas ante el problema de las nacionalidades ibéricas (1931)
- L'evolució del problema agrari a Rússia, des de la servitud feudal al Comunisme (1934)
- Las interpretaciones del marxismo (1937).
- El futur de Catalunya i els deures polítics de l'emigració catalana (1943)

== Archival legacy ==
Jordi Arquer assembled a substantial personal archive during his exile, consisting of over thirty boxes of correspondence between 1939 and 1976. This collection includes thousands of letters from hundreds of correspondents. A selection of 104 letters, including some from George Orwell, was later published.

The collection is held at the CRAI Biblioteca del Pavelló de la República, part of the University of Barcelona, and is part of the Centre d’Estudis Històrics Internacionals. The fund reflects Arquer’s dedication to preserving documents on the Spanish Republican exile and the history of the workers' movement.

== Legacy and recognition ==
In 2004, a critical edition of part of Arquer’s correspondence, titled Fons Jordi Arquer: correspondència (1939–1981), was published by Editorial Afers, under the direction of historian Josep Termes.

This edition highlights Arquer’s work not only as a political thinker and journalist, but also as a historian of the Catalan socialist movement and a bibliophile. His writings and letters provide a valuable resource for understanding Marxism in Catalonia, as well as the ideological debates among the Catalan left in exile.
