= Pilar Santiago =

Spanish teacher and militant

Pilar Santiago Bilbao
- Pilar Santiago Bilbao circa 1930s
- Born: 1914; Barruelo de Santullán, Province of Palencia, Spain
- Died: June 3, 1998 (aged 83–84); Barcelona, Spain
- Resting place: Barcelona, Spain
- Other name: Pilar Trueta
- Occupations: Teacher; Political activist; Archivist; Librarian
- Era: Spanish Second Republic; Spanish Civil War; Francoist Spain; Exile of the Spanish Republicans
- Organizations: Workers' Party of Marxist Unification (POUM); Spanish Federation of Teaching Workers (FETE–UGT); Central Youth Committee of the POUM; Women of 36 Association
- Known for: Militant of the Workers' Party of Marxist Unification (POUM); member of the Women of 36 Association
- Notable work: Contributions to the underground newspaper La Batalla and the magazine Emancipació
- Movement: Spanish Republican movement; Marxism; Feminism
- Spouses: Joan Hervàs (m. 1933; murdered 1938); Rafael Trueta Raspall (m. 1942; died 1958)
- Children: 2 (Helena and Rafael)
- Awards: Honored posthumously by the Barcelona City Council (2024) with a passage named Passatge Pilar Santiago Bilbao

Pilar Santiago Bilbao ( Barruelo de Santullán, Palencia, 1914 - Barcelona, June 3, 1998) also known as Pilar Trueta, was a Spanish teacher and militant of the Workers' Party of Marxist Unification (POUM) exiled in Mexico.

== Biography ==
=== Childhood ===
Born in the province of Palencia, her father, a railway worker, was transferred to Barcelona in 1916. The family settled in the neighborhood of Sant Andreu de Palomar. She studied primary studies, based on the Modern School method, at the Ateneu Obrer de Sant Andreu.

=== Adulthood ===
In 1929 she entered the Normal School of Teachers and finished her teaching career in 1933. She was a teacher, among other places, at the Ateneo Obrer where she had been educated.

She joined the Workers' and Peasants' Bloc, and the union of the Spanish Federation of Teaching Workers (FETE- UGT ). That same year she entered the POUM and there she met teacher Joan Hervàs, whom she married. As a member of the Central Youth Committee of the POUM, she developed an intense propaganda activity alongside Andreu Nin and Wilebaldo Solano. She was part of the Women's Secretariat of the party and worked side by side with Maria Teresa Garcia Banus, known as Teresa Andrade. When the Civil War broke out, she contributed to the magazine Emancipació and participated in numerous meetings. She was also in charge, from the May 1937 Events, of the distribution of the underground newspaper La Batalla.

=== Murder of her husband and imprisonment ===
After the murder of her husband Joan Hervàs on the Aragon Front, in March 1938, in the midst of repression against the POUM, Pilar Santiago was arrested and after going through several checks, she was admitted to the Women's Prison of Les Corts until August 13, when she was released.

=== France ===
After prison she moved to Lyon, where she worked as a teacher in an infant school. From 1939 she resided in Paris and established contact with the French Workers and Peasants' Socialist Party (PSOP).

=== New marriage and Mexico ===
In 1942 she married Rafael Trueta Raspall (doctor and brother of the traumatologist Josep Trueta i Raspall ) and they emigrated to Mexico with their daughter Helena (child of their first marriage), aboard the ship Nyassa, which arrived in port of Veracruz in May of that year. There the couple set up a workshop making dolls and clothing bags, which allowed him to open a practice and practice medicine.

Pilar Santiago studied Library Science and Archives at the Escuela Normal Superior de México and later History. After obtaining the degree in 1948, she worked in the mornings at the Madrid College, in the afternoons at the state school "Los Niños Héroes" Her husband Rafael Trueta, seventeen years older than her, with who had had a second son -Rafael-, died in Cuernavaca in 1958.

=== Retirement and death ===
From 1984, the year of her retirement, Pilar Santiago often traveled to Barcelona. Among other activities, she advised the filmmaker Ken Loach in the preparation of the filming of the film "Terra i Llibertat". She died on June 3, 1998, at the age of 83.

== Legacy ==
The Barcelona City Council, as part of the plan to feminize the citizen nomenclature, agreed at the Sant Andreu district plenary on May 5, 2024, to dedicate a passage, located in the Sagrera neighborhood, between Carrer Concepció, to Pilar Santiago Bilbao Arenal and Avinguda Meridiana.

== Oral testimony ==
In 1997, the activist Llum Ventura, then councilor of the Ciutat Vella district, together with Pilar Santiago and a group of women older than eighty, ex-prisoners and reprisals, formed the organization Women of 36 Association with the aim of to remind the new generations that the political and social advances that women enjoy today date from a struggle that became clear in 1931 with the advent of the Republic.

The oral testimony of Pilar Santiago was collected, together with that of eight other women, by the historian Mercedes Vilanova Ribas and the anthropologist Mercedes Fernández Martorell. The material was transferred, in 1997, to the Historical Archive of the City of Barcelona and since then, it can be consulted in the Oral Collection "Women of 36".
