= Juventud Comunista (newspaper) =

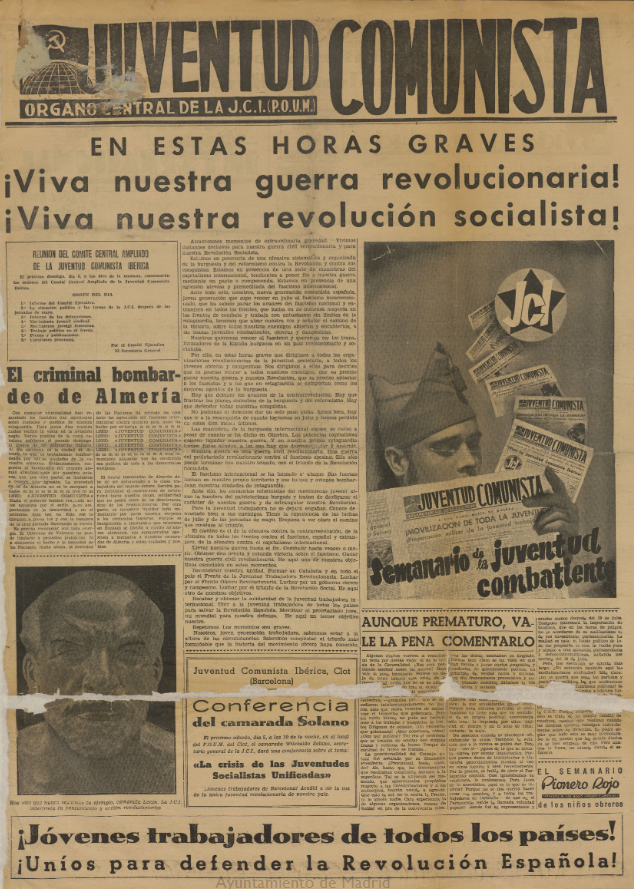
- Type: Weekly
- Publisher: Iberian Communist Youth
- Founded: 17 September 1936
- Ceased publication: 1937
- Political alignment: Marxism
- Language: Spanish language
- Headquarters: Barcelona
- Circulation: 15,000

Juventud Comunista ('Communist Youth') was a weekly newspaper published from Barcelona, Spain 1936–1937. It was the central organ of the Iberian Communist Youth (JCI), the youth wing of POUM. The first issue was published on 17 September 1936. It was printed in large format, with four pages. The newspaper carried photos and caricatures. Juventud Comunista had a circulation of 15,000.
