= Leon Narwicz =

Revolutionary (1911–1938)

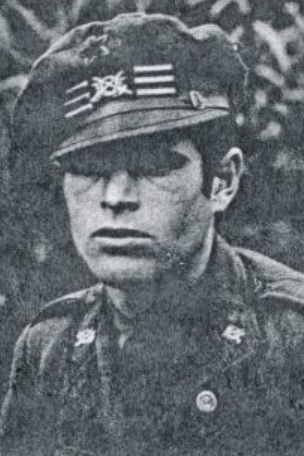
- Born: 1911 unknown, Ukraine, Russian Empire
- Died: 1938 (aged 26–27); Barcelona, Spain
- Known for: Soviet agent
- Political party: French Communist Party

Leon Narwicz (Russian: Леон Нарвич, Лев Нарвич), also Leon Narvich, León Druan (1911–1938) was a radical left-wing political militant and revolutionary of mixed Polish, Jewish and Russian background. He was related to the Communist movement in Russia, Poland, Belgium and France. He took part in the Spanish Civil War as member of the International Brigades, serving in French or/and Polish units as a political commissar. He was acting as agent of the Soviet intelligence NKVD and the Republican military counter-intelligence Servicio de Información Militar. His primary task was penetration into and subversion of POUM groups in Catalonia; Narwicz was possibly related to detention of Andreu Nin. He was shot by a Trotskyist hit squad in Barcelona. He is known mostly in relation to internal conflicts within the Republican coalition during the war, and especially in relation to Soviet Communist attempt to dominate other political currents.

== Family, childhood, youth ==
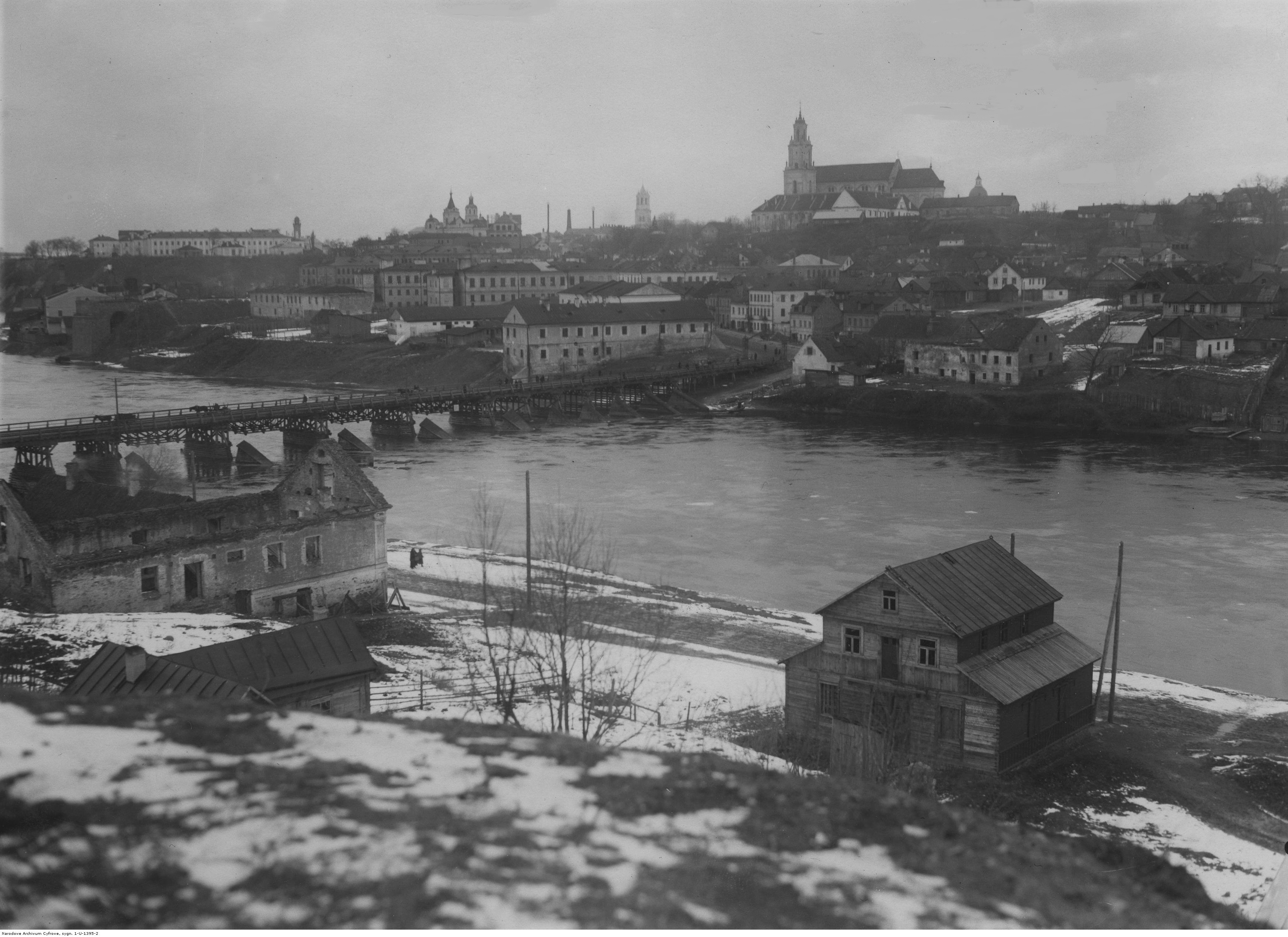
Grodno, 1920s

There are few details available as to Narwicz's family; his parents are not known by name. In the early 1910s they lived in the Russian Empire, in Ukraine. According to some sources they formed part of the Russian Jewry, though in historiography Narwicz might be referred to also as a Russian or a Pole. His father was involved in revolutionary work and following the Bolshevik takeover in Russia he was posted to Belarus, where he served as a commissar responsible for ensuring foodstuff delivery quotas. In 1921 he was killed, according to his son by the kulaks; perhaps the crime was related to land collectivisation in the USSR.

It is not clear who was bringing up Leon following the death of his father; according to unclear sources he led a nomadic life, perhaps as an adolescent vagrant. In the mid-1920s as a teenager he happened to be in Odessa. In unclear circumstances he boarded a ship and sailed to Danzig, from where he moved to Poland; he settled in Grodno. This is where he got engaged in workers’ movement, taking part in rallies of the unemployed and getting in touch with the illegal Communist Party of Poland. Arrested in 1926, he spent at least 3 months behind bars. In the late 1920s he moved to Germany, where he reached the age of majority.

== Revolutionary ==
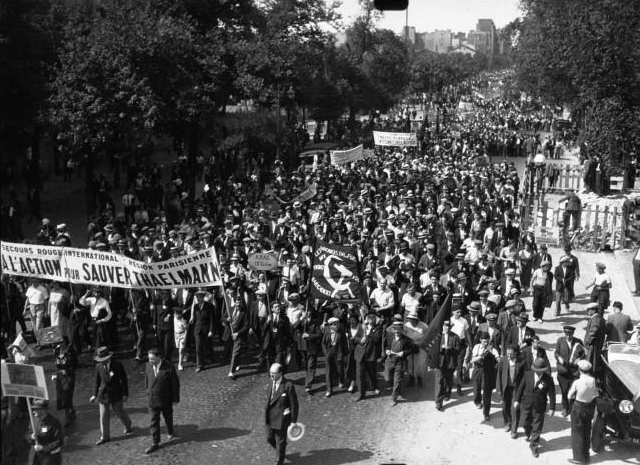
PCF rally, Paris, 1930s

Until 1931 Narwicz was employed in the International Yachting Club in Bremen. He quit to join crew of merchant ships, operating from Germany on long-distance routes, e.g. to Africa. In 1932 he moved to Belgium and was soon noted as engaged in strike movement of miners in the coal-basin of Borinage. Detained by the police and having unclear sanctions administered against him, Narwicz left for Antwerp; he was secretary to an illegal workers organisation, grouping mostly Russian and Ukrainian migrants. He was detained again, it is not known whether sentenced. He spent 8 months in jail and was released thanks to amnesty.

Unable to find work in Belgium, Narwicz moved to France. None of the sources consulted provides information on his early employment and residence, some time later he settled in Paris. He joined th French Communist Party and in the mid-1930s remained its very active member, mostly in a section grouping Russian migrants. He was active also in Homebound Union (Союз возвращения). It was an organization, set up in the mid-1920s, which catered to pro-Soviet Paris Russians; financed and controlled by the USSR, de facto it was a platform enabling operations of Soviet secret services, especially foreign intelligence. At the time Narwicz lived with a Russian woman, whom he used to introduce as his wife Emma.

== IB volunteer: frontline service ==
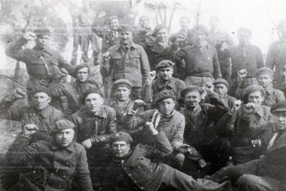
Polish IB volunteers, 1937

In early August 1936 PCF sent Narwicz to Spain. His initial role is unclear; it is known that he fought on the Aragon front, near Huesca. He was assigned to a machine-gun company, in support of a Republican artillery unit. In the autumn of 1936, following launch of the International Brigades scheme, he was assigned to their structures as a political commissar. In November 1936 he took part in fightings in Casa de Campo, at the ouskirts of Madrid.

Narwicz's exact service assignement is subject to doubt. Some sources claim he was member of the "Paris Commune Battalion" in the francophone XIV Brigade. Other maintain that he rather formed part of "Mickiewicz Company" in the early XIII Brigade, before it was re-formatted as a Polish-Slavic unit. There are also notes about his membership in Mickiewicz Battalion in the XIII Brigade. Some recollections present him as a political commissar of an unidentified "trotskyist battalion". According to one historian he was not a political commissar, but a commander of the Mickiewicz Company and as such took part in the battle of Brunete in the summer of 1937. At some point he was wounded in the lungs, not clear whether during this battle or during some other engagement.

== IB volunteer: spy and agent ==
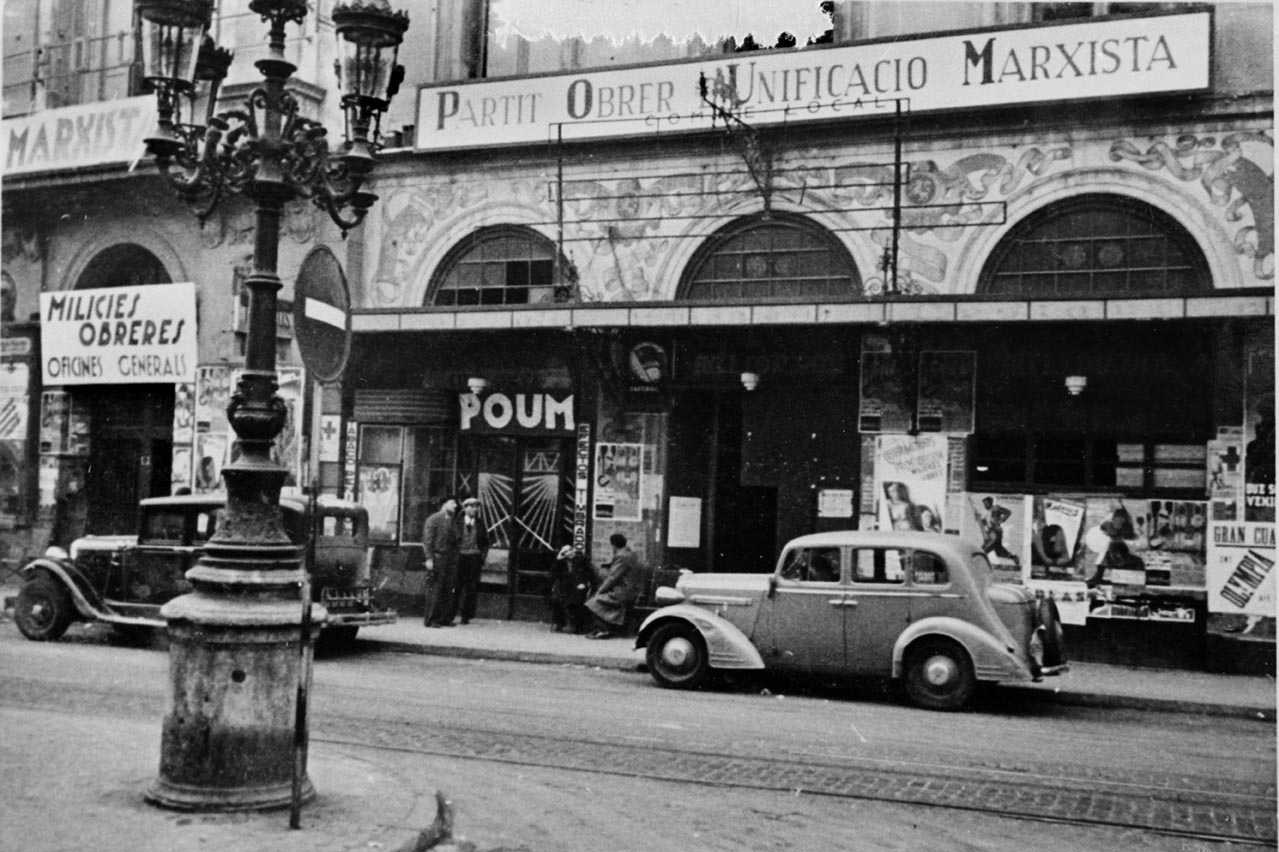
POUM office, Barcelona

In the spring of 1937 – most likely during a break between two periods of frontline service – Narwicz spent time in Barcelona. British volunteers later suspected him of spying on the Independent Labour Party centre, which included copying confidential and personal documents. Before the so-called May Days Narwicz supposedly got in touch with POUM leaders, including Andreú Nin, posing as a Russian communist opposed to the Stalinist dictatorship. According to some historians Narwicz was operating either as an agent or as functionary of NKVD. He was later suspected of having been involved in setting a trap for Nin, detained in the summer of 1937. In October 1937 Narwicz obtained sick leave from International Brigades and travelled to Paris. In the French capital he renewed his links to Alliance of Friends of the Soviet Fatherland, successor to the Homebound Union.

In late 1937 or in early 1938 Narwicz returned to Spain. He was not returned to the front lines, but instead received orders to stay in Barcelona. Formally he was still member of the 4th Battalion of the XIII Brigade, with the rank of captain. At the turn of 1937- 1938 Narwicz's key task was to penetrate into and subvert supposed Trotskyist conspiracy, especially in the XII. and XIV. Brigades. As "León Druan" he infiltrated Sección Bolchevique-Leninista de España (SBLE), a Trotskyist organisation active in Barcelona; he reported directly to one of International Brigades leader, Luigi Longo. Thanks to his intelligence information, the republican security arrested some 40 members of SBLE and POUM.

== IB volunteer: death ==
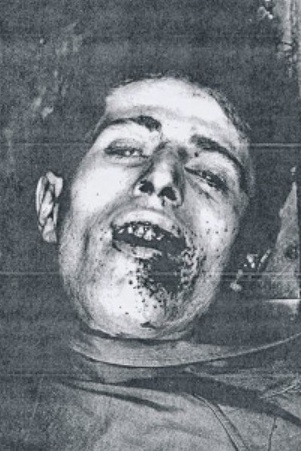
Narwicz's corpse

Narwicz was identified by the Barcelona Trotskyists as an undercover operative thanks to a photograph, published in the official Republican press. With his actual surname in the caption, he featured alongside the Communist commander Enrique Lister. POUM and SBLE leaders who still remained at liberty learned that they were most likely being infiltrated by Soviet and republican special services. They also started to speculate that there was a link between Narwicz's earlier frequent visits in the headquarters and the disappearance of Nin. Claiming that he was to pass some important documents, one of the militants asked Narwicz for a meeting.

On the evening of February 10, 1938, Narwicz was found dead at Calle Legalidad in Barcelona. He has been shot several times, including in the head, while his personal belongings, including documents, money, and a pistol, remained on him. International Brigades services, along the Republican services, commenced investigation, which soon detained three individuals. Tribunal d'Espionatge i Alta Traició de Catalunya, one of revolutionary courts set up during the war, condemned all of them to death following a brief trial. They were not ultimately executed and the following year they left Spain. Though there were some further arrests, neither the case of presumed spying nor the case of assassination have been fully clarified. However, many historians claim unequivocally that Narwicz has been shot in revenge for Nin.

== In historiography ==
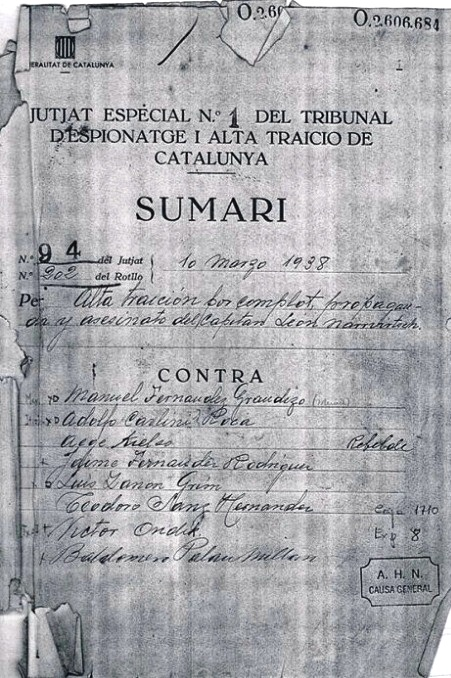
Narwicz murder file

According to one theory Narwicz has not perished in Spain, but was recalled to the USSR and died in 1939 in another wave of Stalinist purges. As in Catalan archives there is extensive documentation from the trial of his supposed assassins, this theory is not viewed as sustainable. This set contains testimonies of the accused and other police data. The documents in question – plus minor fragmentary pieces in recollections published by various people later – remain the only source of information on Narwicz. So far no historian found any documents related to Narwicz in Russian, Polish, German, Belgian or French archives.

In the broad Spanish public discourse Narwicz re-appeared on exceptional basis in 1963, during the trial against Julian Grimau; the latter was suspected of having tortured individuals charged with murdering Narwicz in 1938. Except one para-documentary article and a pamphlet on Stalinist repressions in Barcelona there is no monograph dedicated to Narwicz. In the Spanish historiography he is marginally mentioned in relation either to the death of Nin or to the process of Grimau. In the Russian historiography he appears in discourse on NKVD activity in Spain. In the Polish historiography he is almost entirely absent. During the Communist era he was barely mentioned in hagiographic works on the International Brigades, always in relation to his frontline service. Currently he might be mentioned in scientific works and popular publications, though against the NKVD background; some works pursue entirely erroneous narrative.

== See also ==
- POUM
- XIII International Brigade
