= Women of 36 Association =

Women of ’36 Association
- Asociación Mujeres del 36
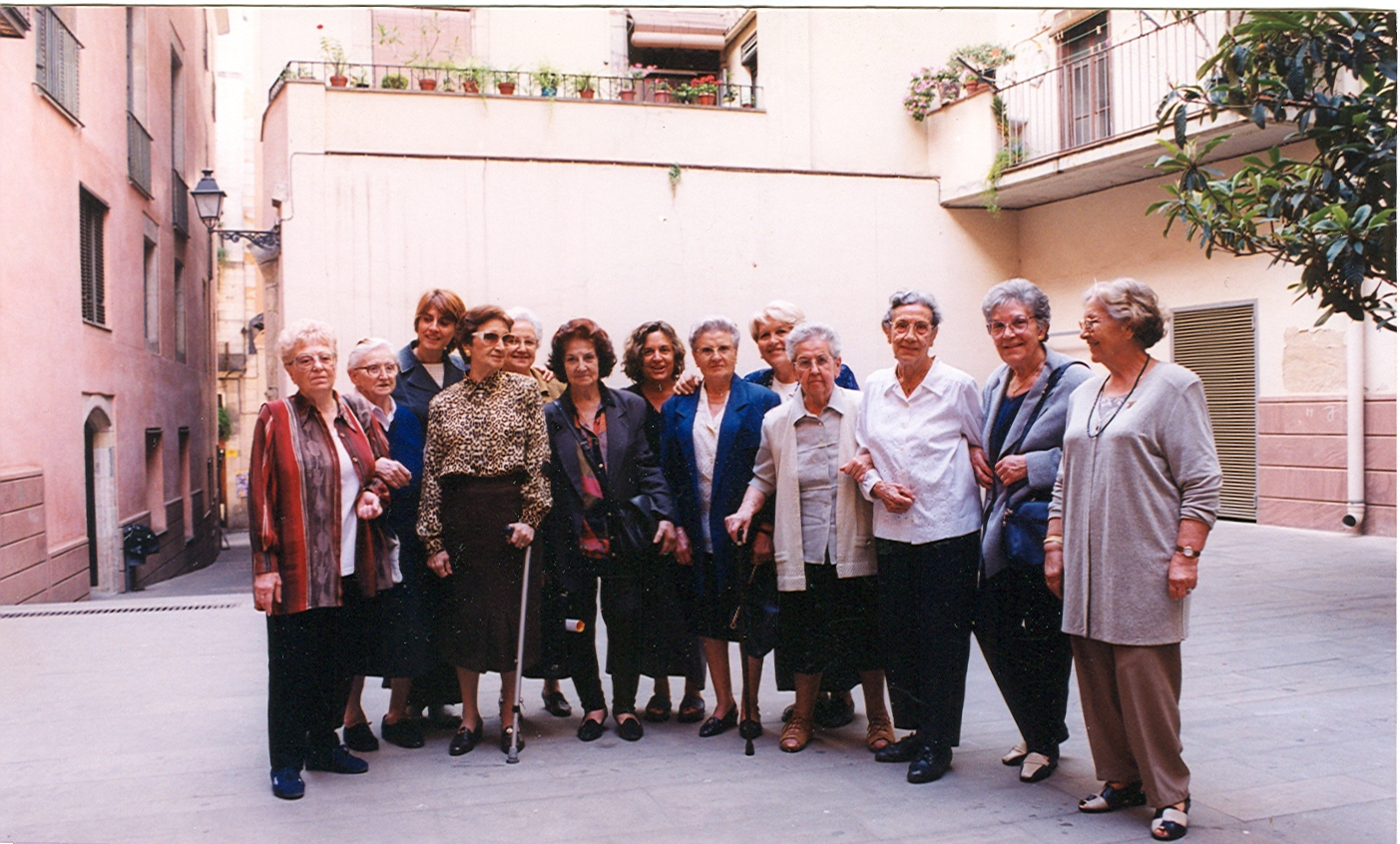
- Formation: 1997
- Dissolved: 2007
- Type: Nonprofit association
- Purpose: Recovery and transmission of women's memories of the Spanish Civil War
- Headquarters: Barcelona, Spain
- Region served: Spain
- Methods: Public talks; Oral history interviews; Exhibitions; Publications
- Official language: Spanish; Catalan
- Spokesperson: Enriqueta Gallinat
- Main organ: Assembly
- Publication: Les Dones del 36. Un silenci convertit en paraula · 1997–2006 (2006) (in Catalan)

The Women of 36 Association (in Spanish "Asociación Mujeres del 36") was an organization founded in 1997 in Spain by a group of women who had survived the Spanish Civil War. The name contains a reference to 1936, the year in which the war started.

The goal of the association was to help society — especially younger generations — understand that period of history through the experiences of women who defended freedom and democracy, who lived through the war on the front lines or in the rearguard, who suffered imprisonment or internment in concentration camps, or who were repressed during Francoist Spain for their clandestine political activity.

The association dissolved in 2007, as most of its members were already over ninety years old.

== History ==
In 1996, Llum Ventura, then councillor for the Ciutat Vella District of the Barcelona City Council, learned of a tribute to women who had participated in the Spanish Civil War being organized by the Librería de Mujeres in Madrid.

She believed a similar event should be held in Barcelona and soon contacted several such women—mostly unknown to the public—whose experiences formed part of Spain’s collective memory. Through these meetings she learned of their time at the front, in clandestinity, in exile, and in prison. That same year, during the celebration of the 20th anniversary of the First Feminist Conferences, testimonies from some of these women were read publicly.

In 1997, the Maria Aurèlia Capmany Prize, awarded annually by the Barcelona City Council on March 8, was dedicated to projects led by elderly women. Various of these women established the Association Women of ’36 and presented a proposal for recovering and transmitting the memory of women who had lived through the war, defended freedom and democracy, and often paid the price through exile or imprisonment. The group’s spokesperson, Enriqueta Gallinat, presented and defended the project before the City Council.

Gallinat described the initiative as follows:

"We are elderly women, around eighty years old. Life is slipping away, and before we depart into nothingness, we want to leave our testimony in videos, writings, and lectures in schools and associations so that the active role that women of our country played, each from her own place, is not forgotten."

The project received both the jury’s prize and the public’s award. A year later, following the award’s guidelines, they presented a summary of the work carried out since winning the prize. María Salvo reported:

"During this year we have met with secondary school students, participated in round tables in civic centers, and given interviews on radio, television, and in the press. We also organized an exhibition in february at the Montserrat Roig Hall of the Pati Llimona Civic Center and produced a video with our testimonies."

== Members ==
The founding members were eight:

- Victoria Carrasco Peñalver (1917–2003)
- Carmen Casas Godessart (1921–2013)
- Rosa Cremón Parra (1914–2005)
- Trinidad Gallego Prieto (1913–2011)
- Enriqueta Gallinat i Román (1909–2006)
- Concha Pérez Collado (1915–2014)
- Manuela Rodríguez Lázaro (1917–2009)
- María Salvo Iborra (1920–2020).

A few months later, four more joined:

- Emérita Arbonés Sarrias (1920–2015)
- Laia Berenguer Puget (1920–2011)
- Josefina Piquet Ibáñez (1934–2013)
- Victoria Santamaría Palacios (1921–2011)

== Dissolution and legacy ==
At the end of 2006, the association decided to dissolve due to the advanced age of its members. The dissolution was formalized in 2007. Their last activity was the publication of the book Les Dones del 36. Un silenci convertit en paraula · 1997–2006, which compiled the project’s history, biographies of its members, and a record of its activities.

From 1997 to 2004, the Women of ’36 held 179 talks in schools and high schools, 35 in universities, and 142 round tables and public events. They granted 185 personal interviews to journalists, historians, writers, and students. Between 1997 and 2005, they participated in 35 radio programs, 16 television shows, and 16 documentaries, as well as contributing to 29 books and numerous press articles.

== Oral archive ==
The Barcelona City History Archive preserves the Women of ’36 Oral Collection, which includes interviews recorded in 1997 with the association’s eight founders and with Pilar Santiago (1914–1998), a teacher and member of the Workers' Party of Marxist Unification (POUM), also known as Pilar Trueta, after her husband Rafael Trueta.

The testimonies, recorded in 1997 and donated to the archive in 1998, were conducted by historian Mercedes Vilanova Ribas and anthropologist Mercedes Fernández-Martorell. They are available transcribed and digitized.

== Recognitions ==
The association and its members received numerous honors for their work in recovering the historical memory of women during the Civil War and Francoism. These include a tribute from the Barcelona City Council in 2004, the Medalla de Honor de Barcelona in 2006, and recognition from the Generalitat de Catalunya in May 2007.

In 2009, the Plaça de les Dones del 36 (“Square of the Women of ’36”) was inaugurated in the Gràcia district of Barcelona. In Gavà (Baix Llobregat), a public library named Biblioteca Dones del 36 specializes in literature and essays on women, feminism, and social analysis.
