= Iberian Communist Youth =

Former Spanish political party

Iberian Communist Youth (in Spanish: Juventud Comunista Ibérica, JCI) was the youth wing of the Iberian Communist Federation, and later of the Workers' Party of Marxist Unification (POUM). JCI had its main strength in Catalonia and the Llevant (Land of Valencia and Murcia). The 1934 conference of JCI elected Germinal Vidal as the general secretary of JCI. After his death, Wilebaldo Solano from Valencia was elected in his place.

POUM provided some paramilitary training for JCI.

JCI started publishing Juventud Comunista as its weekly central organ in 1936. Juventud Comunista was published from Barcelona. Other JCI publications were Generación roja (Barcelona, began publication in May 1937), Juventud obrera (Barcelona, from July 12, 1937, weekly) and La Antorcha, itself a continuation of the 1920–21 El Comunista that was renamed with upon formation of the Communist Party of Spain (Madrid, from 1936, weekly).

JCI was a member organization of the International Bureau of Revolutionary Socialist Youth. Solano was elected general secretary of the Bureau at a conference in Brussels in 1937.

In 1937 JCI formed the Revolutionary Youth Front (FJR) together with the Libertarian Youth (JJ.LL.) and other youth groups.
