= Mahlon Perkins =

American diplomat (1882–1963)

Mahlon Fay Perkins (23 November 1882 – 1963) was a United States diplomat. After serving in China for many years, he was consul-general in Barcelona during the Spanish Civil War. It was his intervention which saved the lives of Charles Orr and Lois Orr after they had been arrested in the Stalinist crackdown on the Workers' Party of Marxist Unification (POUM). He visited them several times when they were in captivity, securing their release on 1 July 1937, and placing them on a ship bound for Marseilles on 3 July.

Perkins' rescue of the Orr's took place in the context of "the most scrupulous policy of nonintervention" by the US government in Spanish affairs. In its strict application, this policy prevented consular protection of American volunteers, such as those in the Abraham Lincoln Battalion, who enlisted in the armies of the Second Spanish Republic.

Perkins, born in North Adams, Massachusetts, graduated from Harvard University in 1904. He was U.S. Vice Consul in Chefoo, 1911–12; Shanghai, 1915–17; U.S. Consul in Changsha, 1918–20; Tientsin, 1926–27; and counselor of legation in Beijing, 1928-33.

After serving in Barcelona, Mahlon Perkins was counselor of legation in Copenhagen from 1937 to 1941. In October 1940, with Denmark under German occupation, Perkins successfully resisted attempts by the IBM Corporation to use diplomatic channels "to further (its) subsidiary's work with the Nazis there".

== Mahlon Perkins Jr ==
In 1978, his son, also named Mahlon F. Perkins (1918–2011), who was born in Shanghai, featured in a scandal that rocked the New York legal profession. The younger Perkins, then a partner in the law firm of Donovan, Leisure, Newton & Irvine, which was representing Kodak, admitted lying in an antitrust case brought against the company. He was sentenced to a month in prison and subsequently became a civil liberties lawyer, volunteering with the Center for Constitutional Rights for over 11 years.

Perkins graduated from Harvard College in 1940 and enlisted in the US Army in 1942. He served in the Office of Strategic Services and was based in Kunming, China. At the end of the war, in August 1945, he parachuted into Beijing as a member of the 7-man Operation MAGPIE to secure the release of over 600 Allied soldiers and civilians from a Japanese prison camp, for which he was awarded the U.S. Army's Soldier's Medal for Valor and the Chinese Order of the Flying Cloud.

Perkins graduated in 1949 from Harvard Law School, where he was an editor of the Harvard Law Review, and subsequently joined the firm of Donovan Leisure. He specialized in antitrust litigation, with cases such as Hughes Tool Co. v. TWA, and for years represented the American Association of Advertising Agencies.

At the Center for Constitutional Rights, Perkins worked on behalf of the Corazon Aquino government of the Philippines, for the recovery of real estate from Ferdinand Marcos; the White Earth Nation, against the taking of land without just compensation; an association of Harvard alumni seeking South African divestiture; Darryl King, for reversal of his wrongful murder conviction; and Haitian victims of human rights abuses.
