= Lois Orr =

American Marxist and writer (1917–1985)

Lois Orr (23 April 1917 – August 1985), also known as Louise Cusick, Lois Cusick and Lois Culter was a 20th-Century American member of the Workers' Party of Marxist Unification (POUM) female militia.

== Background ==
Orr was born in Louisville, Kentucky. She attended University of Louisville, where she met Charles Orr. In her sophomore year, she married Charles. They traveled to Europe for their honeymoon, where they visited several countries including Nazi Germany. They were about to embark to India, but heard about the uprising and the start of the Spanish Civil War.

== Career ==
Orr lived in Barcelona during the Spanish Civil War, where she was a member of the Workers' Party of Marxist Unification (POUM) female militia. She and her husband, survived the Stalinist attack on the POUM in June 1937, after the fighting of the Barcelona May Days. They were arrested on 17 June, the day after Andreu Nin Pérez and the POUM executive were arrested, but were released on 1 July and placed by the US consul, Mahlon Perkins, on a ship bound for Marseilles on 3 July 1937. They were in Mexico in 1940 when Leon Trotsky was murdered.

== Legacy ==
An edited collection of her letters home to the US from Spain were published in 2009.
