= Àngel Estivill =

Catalan Anarchist and Writer

- Born: 1909; El Molar, Priorat
- Died: December 10, 1994 (aged 84–85); Cuauhtémoc, Mexico City
- Occupation: Journalist
- Organization(s): Workers' and Peasants' Bloc, PSUC, Socialist Movement of Catalonia

Àngel Estivill (1909-December 10, 1994) was a Catalan anarchist and writer. Estivill was born in 1909 to an anarchist father who also worked as a carpenter. In 1919, his family moved to Barcelona and he studied at the Domènec Schools in Gràcia.

Estivill worked as a journalist for The Hour newspaper in the 1930s, which was the newspaper of the Bloc Obrer i Camperol (Worker's and Peasant Block.) Estivill fought in the July 1936 uprising in Barcelona and later was made commissioner the People's Army of the Spanish Republic, and president of the Correctional Services Committee of Catalonia (December 1936 – July 1937). He commanded a unit of 2000 soldiers with Jose del Barrio and Manuel Trueba with the Unified Socialist Party of Catalonia (PSUC). After the Fascist victory in 1939, he passed through the Collioure and Argelers concentration camps, and left the PSUC.

Estivill moved to Mexico City in exile and joined the Socialist Movement of Catalonia party, an organization that operated underground in Francoist Spain and by exiles abroad. He continued his work as a journalist. He worked on the newspapers Endavant (the party newspaper of the Socialist Movement of Catalonia) and Enllà and was a radio newscaster. Estivill died in 1994 in the Cuauhtemoc borough of Mexico City.

== Works ==
- Catalunya lliure, repúbliques confederades d'Ibèria, cap a l'emancipació del proletariat hispànic (A free Catalonia, confederated republics of Iberia, towards the emancipation of the Hispanic proletariat.) Marxists Internet Archive
- Els obrers i els problemes nacionalitaris (Workers and National Issues) Marxists Internet Archive
- Lina Odena, la gran heroína de las juventudes revolucionarias de España, 1936
