= Teresa Andrade =

Teresa Andrade, known at birth as María Teresa García Banús (Valencia, 1895 - Madrid, 19 November 1989), was a communist activist, translator and publisher, married to the communist activist Juan Andrade, from whom she took her surname. She was the granddaughter of the Valencian photographer Antonio García Peris and, therefore, the niece of the painter Joaquín Sorolla.

== Biography ==
In 1899, when she was still a child, the family moved to Madrid. At the suggestion of Luis Simarro, a family friend, she studied at the Instituto Internacional. Years later, she won a scholarship to the United States as a Spanish language assistant at Vassar College. Around 1918 she studied philosophy and literature in Madrid, and her feminist concerns began with her membership of a women's students' association and her approach to political activism, as she recounts in her memoirs.

In 1924 Teresa met Juan Andrade, an activist who had served on the First Committee of the Spanish Communist Party in 1920, with whom she began to collaborate, translating and writing political articles. They got married in March 1929. From then on she took her husband's surname. She joined the Spanish Communist Opposition (OCE), a section of the International Communist Opposition led by Leon Trotsky. She contributed to Comunismo, a bulletin founded in 1931, and a few months later she and her husband founded the OCE publishing house to publish pamphlets and manuals for political education. Teresa was also in contact with other communist formations in Germany and France and with the OIC itself. She was also a member of the OCI.

In 1935 they moved to Barcelona, where they strengthened their links with other activists such as Víctor Alba during a period characterised by social upheaval. Teresa joined the editorial staff of La Batalla. This was the organ of the Bloc Obrer i Camperol (BOC). There she promoted the creation of the Women's Secretariat of the Workers' Party of Marxist Unity (POUM). She was also director of the women's bulletin Emancipación, which was published from February 1937. The mission of the Women's Secretariat of the POUM was 'to study the problems of women and to find solutions to them, as well as to promote in the women of the working class an awareness of these problems and of the fact that they can only be solved by socialism'. Although the POUM never had its own women's organisation, Teresa herself and many other militants, including Olga Tareeva, Louise Gómez, Luisa Ariño, Pilar Romeu, María Manonelles, Elisa Masso, Pilar Santiago and Luisa Carbonell, worked within the Women's Secretariat and worked tirelessly to emancipate women. Among their initiatives were a section for nurses, an educational section with language and general cultural courses, and the most successful, a sewing workshop run by Toska, a militant Trotskyist seamstress in exile.

When the Executive Committee of the POUM was arrested in June 1937, Teresa mobilised with the Republican authorities to secure their release, until she herself was arrested in April 1938 and imprisoned in the women's prison in Barcelona, where she was held on and off until the end of the war. Released in 1939 when Franco's troops invaded Barcelona, she remained in hiding until she could escape to France, where she was identified, paroled during World War II and reunited with Juan Andrade.

Her house in Paris was a meeting place for party militants and many Spanish exiles, and in the 1960s she hosted politicised emigrants and organised conferences and meetings. In the 1960s, and in the 1970s was involved in a number of political and social movements.

In 1978 she returned from exile with her husband and settled in Madrid. She published several books with texts by Juan Andrade and left some autobiographical stories unfinished during the last years of her life.

== Bibliography ==
- Martínez López, Cándida; Tavera, Susanna (2000). Mujeres en la historia de España: enciclopedia biográfica (1st edition). Barcelona: Planeta. ISBN 84-08-03541-X
- Alba, Victor; Partido Obrero de Unificación Marxista (1978). La Revolución española en la práctica: documentos del POUM ( 1st edition). Ediciones Júcar. ISBN 84-334-5513-3 OCLC 4514359
