= Bonansa =

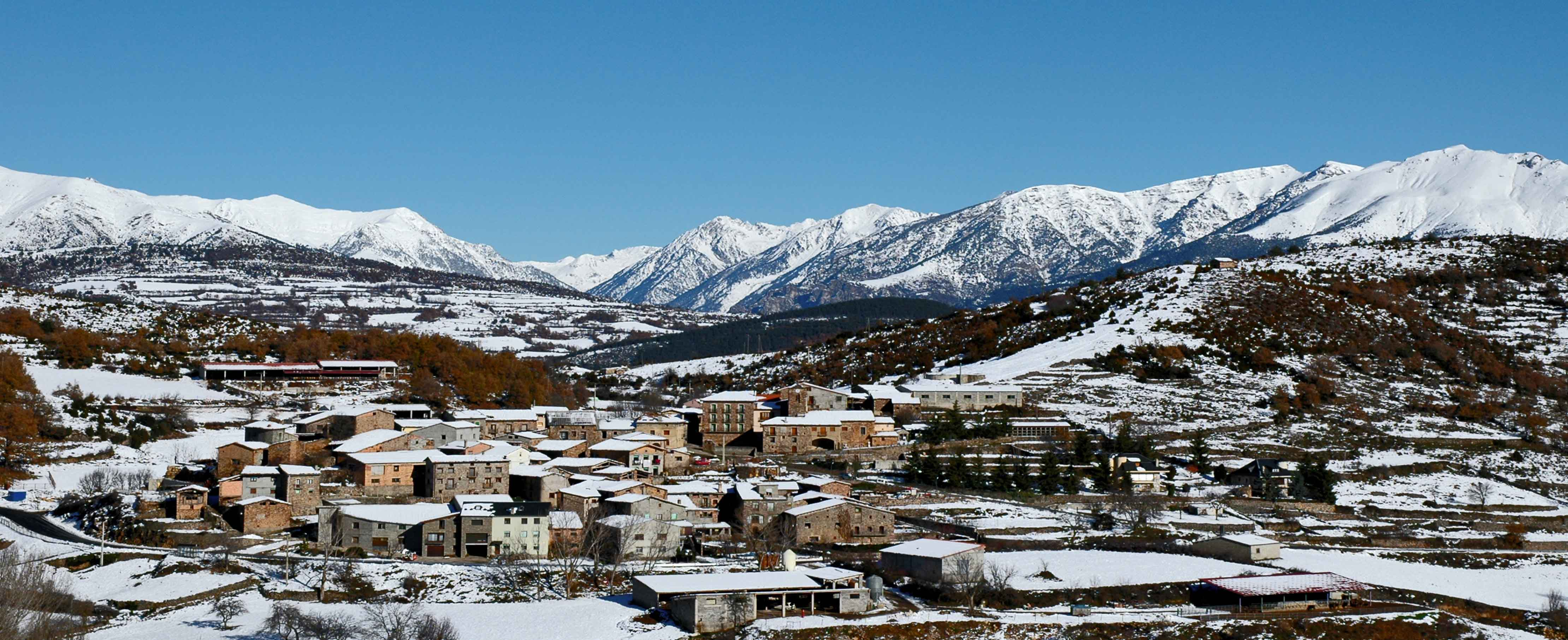
- Bonansa
- Interactive map of Bonansa
- Coordinates: 42°26′N 0°40′E
- Country: Spain
- Autonomous community: Aragon
- Province: Huesca
- Comarca: Ribagorza
- Municipality: Bonansa

Government
  - Type: Mayor-council
  - Body: Ayuntamiento de Bonansa
  - Mayor: Marcelino Iglesias Cuartero (2011) (PSOE)

Area
  - Total: 37 km^{2} (14 sq mi)
- Elevation: 1,256 m (4,121 ft)

Population (2025-01-01)
  - Total: 85
  - Density: 2.3/km^{2} (5.9/sq mi)
- Time zone: UTC+1 (CET)
  - Summer (DST): UTC+2 (CEST)
- Website: www.bonansa.es

Bonansa (Spanish: [boˈnansa], Catalan: [boˈnansa]) is a municipality located in the province of Huesca, Aragon, Spain. According to the 2010 census (INE), the municipality has a population of 102 inhabitants.

Bonansa is located in the central Pyrenees, close to the Spanish-French border. In a diverse natural spot near the Noguera Ribagorzana river.

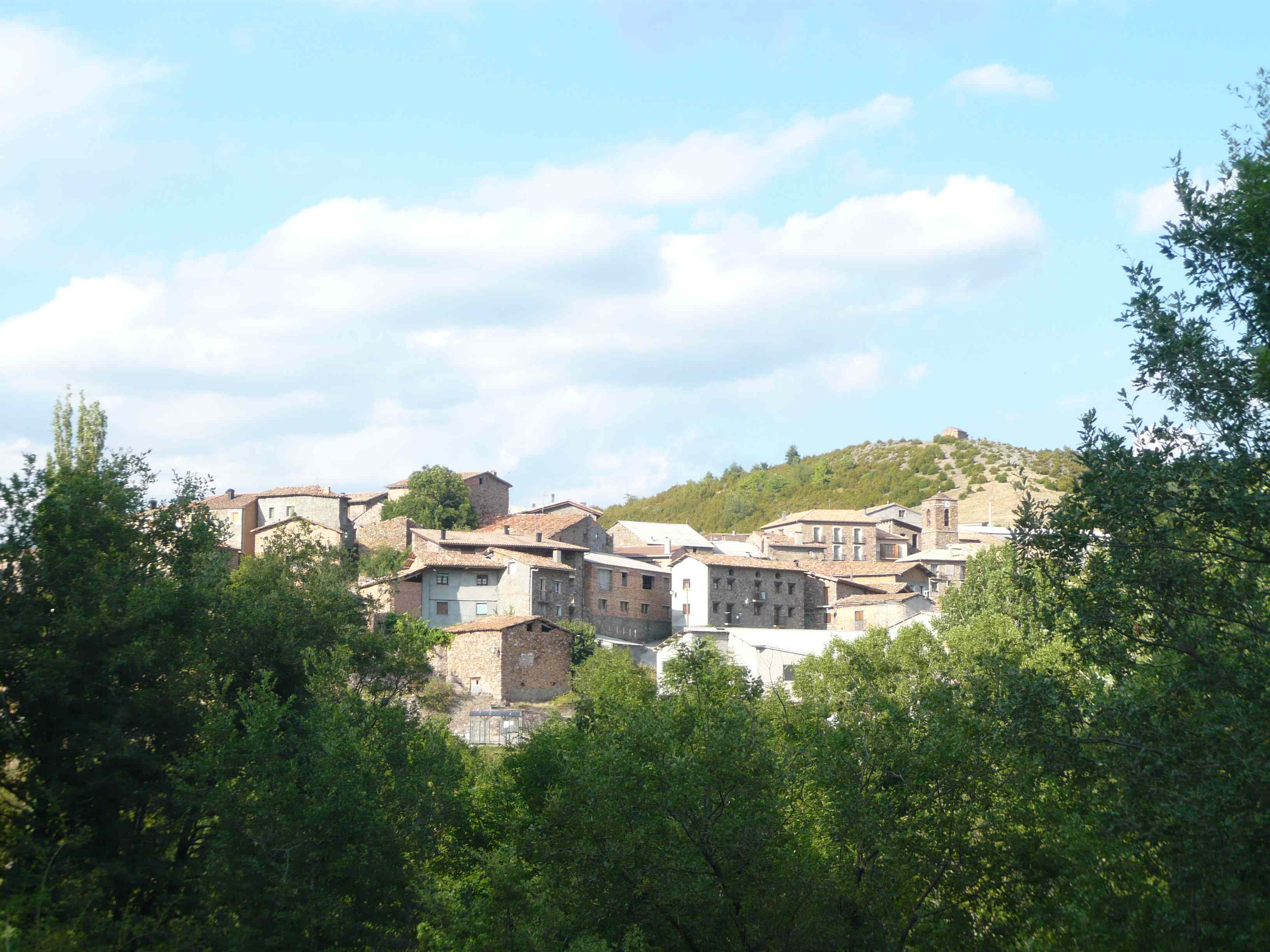
Bonansa

== Notable people ==
- Joaquín Maurín (1896–1973), communist politician

== See also ==
- List of municipalities in Huesca
