= Front for Workers' Unity =

Front for Workers' Unity Frente por la Unidad de los Trabajadores
- Founded: 1977
- Ideology: Communism; Marxism
- Political position: Far-left

Front for Workers' Unity (Spanish: Frente por la Unidad de los Trabajadores, FUT) was a Spanish party alliance formed to contest the 1977 general election by the Revolutionary Communist League (LCR), Communist Action (AC), Organization of Communist Left (OIC) and Workers' Party of Marxist Unification (POUM).

== Member parties ==
- Revolutionary Communist League (LCR)
- Communist Action (AC)
- Organization of Communist Left (OIC)
- Workers' Party of Marxist Unification (POUM)
