= Ferran Gallego =

Spanish historian and professor

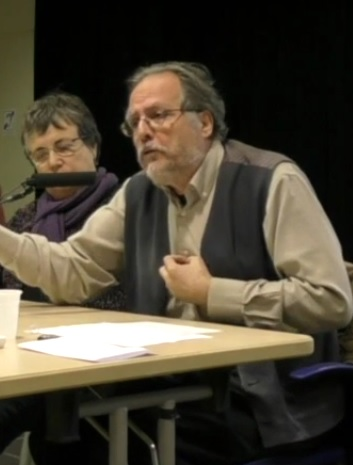
- Gallego at the L'aportació històrica del PSUC conference (Cocheras de Sants, 1 December 2016).
- Born: 1953; Barcelona
- Employer: Autonomous University of Barcelona

Fernando José "Ferran" Gallego Margaleff (born 1953) is a Spanish historian and writer.

== Biography ==
Born in Barcelona in 1953, he earned a PhD in Contemporary History. He is professor at the Autonomous University of Barcelona (UAB). Author of a long list of works, he has studied the contemporary history of Spain, the Latin-American caudillismos and populisms, European fascisms, and 20th-century Germany. He is an expert in the Spanish and wider European extreme right.

== Works ==
Author

- — (1991). Los orígenes del reformismo militar en América Latina. La gestión de David Toro en Bolivia. Barcelona: PPU.
- — (1992). Ejército, nacionalismo y reformismo en América Latina. La gestión de Germán Busch en Bolivia. Barcelona: PPU.
- — (2001). De Munich a Auschwitz. Una historia del nazismo, 1919–1945. Barcelona: Plaza y Janes.
- — (2002). Por qué Le Pen. Barcelona: El Viejo Topo.
- — (2004). Neofascistas. Democracia y extrema derecha en Francia e Italia. Barcelona: Plaza & Janés.
- — (2005). Ramiro Ledesma Ramos y el fascismo español. Madrid: Síntesis.
- — (2005). De Auschwitz a Berlín. Alemania y la extrema derecha, 1945–2004. Barcelona: Plaza y Janés.
- — (2006). Una patria imaginaria. La extrema derecha española (1973–2005). Barcelona: Síntesis.
- — (2006). Todos los hombres del Führer. La élite del nacionalsocialismo. Barcelona: Debate. (Note: Awarded with the Premio Internacional de Ensayo Caballero Bonald in 2007.)
- — (2007). Barcelona, mayo de 1937. Barcelona: Debate.
- — (2008). El mito de la transición. La crisis del franquismo y los orígenes de la democracia (1973–1977). Barcelona: Crítica.
- — (2014). El evangelio fascista. La formación de la cultura política del franquismo (1930–1950). Barcelona: Crítica.

Editor

- Gallego, Ferran, ed. (2004). Pensar después de Auschwitz. Mataró: El Viejo Topo.
- Gallego, Ferran; Morente, Francisco, eds. (2005). Fascismo en España. Ensayos sobre los orígenes sociales y culturales del franquismo. Barcelona: El Viejo Topo.
- Gallego, Ferran; Morente, Francisco, eds. (2011). Rebeldes y reaccionarios. Intelectuales, fascismo y derecha radical en Europa. Mataró: El Viejo Topo.
