= Joaquín Maurín =

Catalan politician. Leader of the BOC and POUM

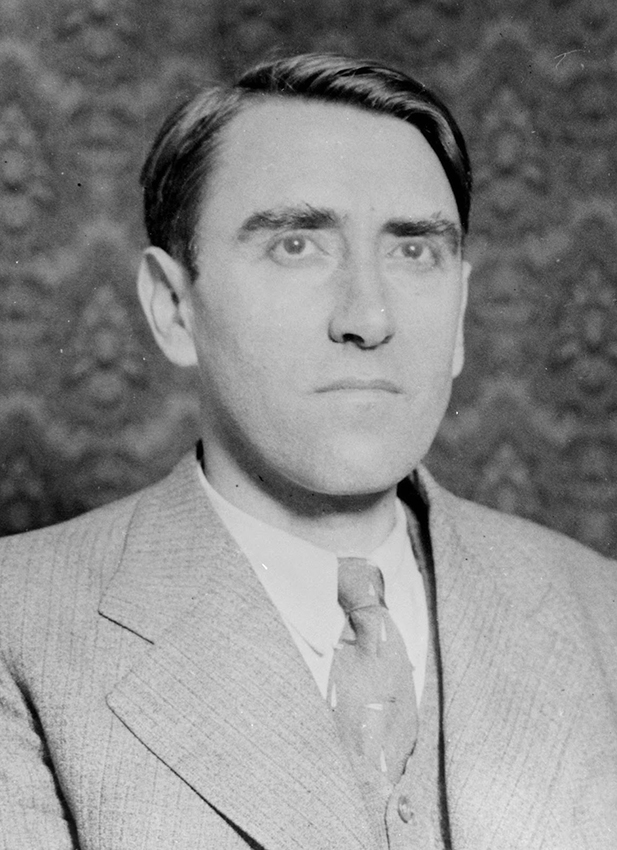

Leader of the Workers' Party of Marxist Unification (POUM)
- In office 1935–1936
- Preceded by: Position established
- Succeeded by: Andreu Nin

Member of the Congress of Deputies
- In office February 1936 – July 1936

General Secretary of the Workers and Peasants' Bloc (BOC)
- In office 1931–1935

General Secretary of the National Confederation of Labor (CNT)
- In office 15 August 1921 – 22 February 1922
- Preceded by: Andreu Nin
- Succeeded by: Joan Peiró

Personal details
- Born: Joaquín Maurín Juliá; 12 January 1896 Bonansa, Huesca, Spain
- Died: 18 August 1950 (aged 65) New York City, New York, United States
- Party: Workers' Party of Marxist Unification; Workers and Peasants' Bloc
- Occupation: Politician, trade unionist

Joaquín Maurín Juliá (Catalan: Joaquim Maurín, 12 January 1896 – 5 November 1973) was a Spanish communist politician and activist. The leader of the Workers and Peasants Bloc (BOC) and of the Workers' Party of Marxist Unification (POUM), he was active mainly in Catalonia.

== Early life ==
Born in Bonansa in Huesca, Aragon, Maurín engaged in socialist politics from early youth and stood trial on several occasions.

== CNT and Profintern ==
After law studies, he practiced in Lleida (Catalonia), where he became affiliated with the anarchist Confederación Nacional del Trabajo (CNT, "National Confederation of Labour"). In 1920, Joaquín Maurín was elected local secretary for the trade union, as well as the editor of its weekly Lucha Social. In 1921, he represented the movement at the Profintern Congress in Moscow, the capital of Soviet Russia. Upon his return, he was elected general secretary of the CNT shortly before being arrested and detained in February 1922. After his release, Maurín founded the Comités Sindicalistas Revolucionarios ("Revolutionary Trade Union Committees") as a Bolshevik group within the CNT. He also gave the committees their own press tribune, La Batalla, in December.

== Communist Party of Spain ==
In 1924, he led his La Batalla into a merger with the Communist Party of Spain and took charge of organising the latter's local wing, the Catalan-Balearic Communist Federation (FCCB). During the crackdown on opposition parties that was ordered by the dictator Miguel Primo de Rivera, Maurín was arrested and jailed in January 1925. Released in 1927, he opted to leave Spain for Paris. However, he returned to Barcelona in 1930 and worked for the reanimation of La Batalla in the months before the proclamation of the Second Spanish Republic in early 1931. He became opposed to Stalinist policies in the Soviet Union and took a stand that saw him grouped with the emergent international Right Opposition. He split with the Communist Party of Spain and led the FCCB into independent politics. (His wing's place in the Stalinist body was quickly taken over by the Communist Party of Catalonia.)

== BOC and POUM ==
On 1 March 1931, the FCCB joined with the Catalan Communist Party and, in 1933, became the Iberian Communist Federation and declared its goal to occupy a place on the national stage. The unified body of the FCCB and the Catalan Communist group became the mass front Workers and Peasants Bloc (BOC), with Maurín as its general secretary. The party was to reach a dominant position in Catalonia.

During the riots provoked by the centrist stance of the Alejandro Lerroux government in 1934, Maurín advocated the forming of united front Alianzas Obreras ("Workers' Alliances") throughout Spain (following a pattern that was proving its force in the Asturias). With the indecisive end of the movements, his party opened itself to an alliance with Andreu Nin’s Trotskyist Communist Left of Spain. The merger was carried out in September 1935, when the two groups formed the POUM and Maurín elected its general secretary.

In line with his views on unified workers' action, the POUM joined the Spanish Popular Front in the runup for the elections of February 1936. Maurín was elected to the Spanish Congress of Deputies on Popular Front lists.

== Capture and exile ==
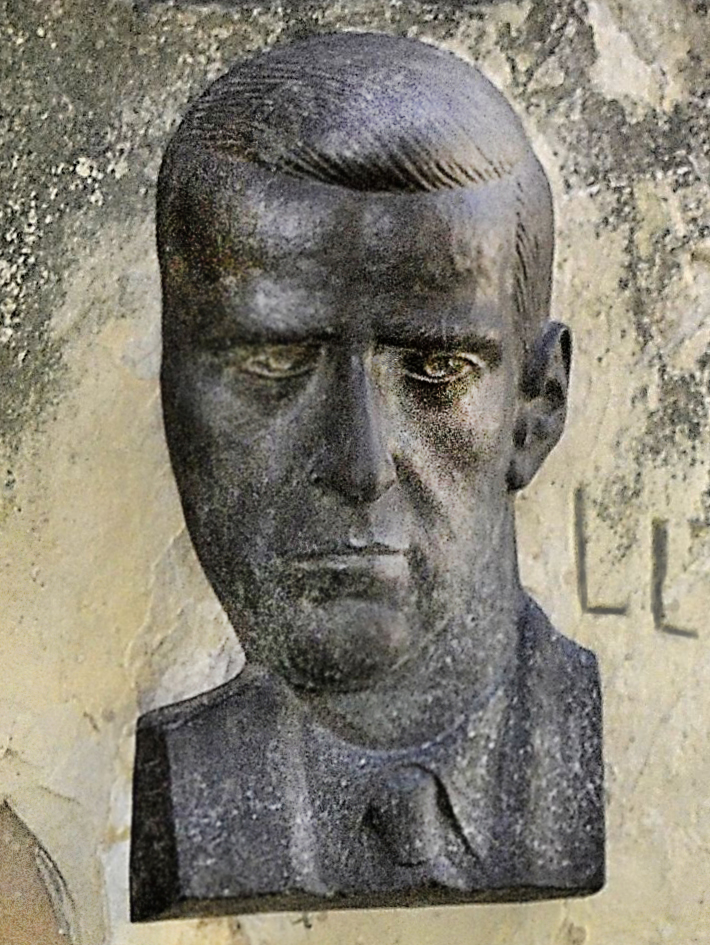
Commemorative plaque of Joaquín Maurín

With the Spanish coup of July 1936 and the start of the Spanish Civil War, Maurín found himself in Francoist Galicia. Attempting to escape through Aragon, he was captured in Jaca. His case came up for trial only in 1944, when he was sentenced to 30 years. However, he was detained until October 1, 1946, when he was paroled under an amnesty for some political prisoners, but confined to Madrid where he worked as a translator.

A witness to both the rise of Francoist Spain and the crushing of the POUM by Stalinist forces, in 1947 he took exile to the United States with his close family. There he created his own press agency and published his writings. Maurín died in New York City.

== Notes ==
Preceded by Andreu Nin Pérez	General Secretary of the CNT 1921-1922	Succeeded by Joan Peiró

Preceded by Role established	Leader of the POUM 1935-1936	Succeeded by Andreu Nin Pérez
