= Communist Party of Catalonia =

Spanish political party (1932-1936)

Communist Party of Catalonia (Catalan: Partit Comunista de Catalunya) was the branch of the Communist Party of Spain in Catalonia. PCC was formed in 1932, substituting the Catalan-Balearic Communist Federation (FCCB). In 1936 PCC merged with other groups to form the Unified Socialist Party of Catalonia. At that time PCC had around 2000 members.

PCC published Catalunya Roja.
