= Catalan Communist Party =

Former political party in Catalonia

Catalan Communist Party Partit Comunista Català
- Leader: Jordi Arquer
- Founded: 1926
- Dissolved: November 1930
- Merged into: Catalan-Balearic Communist Federation
- Newspaper: L'Opinió (1928-1929); L'Andreuenc and Treball (1929-1930)
- Ideology: Communism; Catalan independence Revolutionary socialism Anti-factionalism
- Political position: Left-Wing

Catalan Communist Party (Catalan: Partit Comunista Català) was a political party in Catalonia, Spain. PCC was founded in 1928. It had its origins in the Ateneu Enciclopèdic Popular, which had been formed in 1926, and in the Marxist sectors of the Catalan separatist movement. The main leaders of PCC were Jordi Arquer and Víctor Colomer.

== History ==
The PCC was founded in 1928 by the communist sector of the Catalan independence movement. The party was relatively small, having around 300 members, mainly in Lleida and Barcelona. In November 1930 PCC merged into the Catalan-Balearic Communist Federation (FCCB).

== Newspapers ==
The party published L'Opinió (1928-1929), and later L'Andreuenc and Treball.
