= El Comunista =

El Comunista ("The Communist") was the official publication of the Spanish Communist Party.

The Socialist Youth of Spain (Juventudes Socialistas de España; JSE) had been a proponent of the Second International, an organisation of socialist and labour parties. This stance aligned with that of the Spanish Socialist Workers' Party (Partido Socialista Obrero Español; PSOE), with which it was associated. Following the Russian Revolution in 1917, there was an influx of new and more left-leaning members to the JSE, which caused it to diverge from the PSOE. One of these members was Juan Andrade, who joined the JSE in 1916 and became editor of the official JSE newspaper, Renovación, in 1919; the Renovación then began printing articles supporting the Communist International.

On April 15, 1920, at the Fifth Congress of the JSE, the membership voted to break off from the PSOE, and founded the Spanish Communist Party, leaving behind a small group that wished to rebuild the Socialist Youth of Spain, which continues to exist.

The new party changed the name of Renovación to El Comunista, similar to the name of the official newspaper of the PSOE, El Socialista. Andrade continued as the founding editor of El Comunista, and in the first issue he published the statutes and thesis to be discussed at the new party's First Congress.

The PSOE went through a similar schism at the following year's Congress, when the more left-leaning members (the terceristas) split off to form the Spanish Communist Workers' Party on April 13, 1921, after the PSOE had voted to join the International Working Union of Socialist Parties and reject the Communist International. A few months later, on November 14, the year-old Spanish Communist Party and the newer Spanish Communist Workers' Party merged to form the Communist Party of Spain, at which point El Comunista became La Antorcha, with Andrade continuing as editor.
