= Spanish Communist Party =

1920–1921 communist party in Spain

Spanish Communist Party Partido Comunista Español
- Founded: 15 April 1920
- Dissolved: 14 November 1921
- Merged into: Communist Party of Spain
- Newspaper: El Comunista
- Ideology: Marxism; Communism
- International affiliation: Communist International

The Spanish Communist Party (in Spanish: Partido Comunista Español), was the first communist party in Spain, formed out of the Federación de Juventudes Socialistas (Federation of Socialist Youth, youth wing of Spanish Socialist Workers' Party). The founders of the party, that had belonged to the left-wing within the FJS, included Ramón Merino Gracia, Eduardo Ugarte, Pedro Illescasm Luis Portela, Tiburicio Pico, and Rito Estaban. Partido Comunista Español was formed on April 15, 1920. Its organ was called El Comunista.

Soon after its formation, on November 14, 1921, the party merged with Partido Comunista Obrero Español (Spanish Communist Workers' Party) and formed the Communist Party of Spain.
