= Julián Gorkin =

Spanish writer

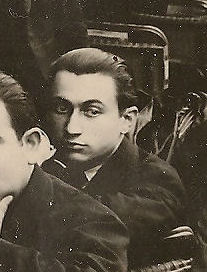
Julián Gómez García in 1925

Julián Gómez García, better known as Julián Gorkin (January 1901 – 8 August 1987), was a Spanish revolutionary socialist, writer and a central leader of the Workers' Party of Marxist Unification (POUM) during the Spanish Civil War.

== Biography ==
Gorkin was born in Valencia on 12 January 1901.

After the Spanish Civil War, he fled to France, and in 1940 he escaped to Mexico with the help of Jay Lovestone, where he became a part of the strong anti-Stalinist socialist community there. He helped obtain visas for Victor Serge and his son Vlady to enter Mexico when they had to escape from the Nazis invading France.

During World War 2, he became an anti-communist, while remaining a member of POUM, and began working with American intelligence to expose communist activities. He returned to Paris in 1948, and from 1953 to 1963 (with a brief interlude in 1959) he was the editor of the periodical Cuadernos published by the CIA front group Congress for Cultural Freedom.

Gorkin died in Paris in 1987. He wrote many books on political and cultural themes, as well as novels and some plays.

== Political writings ==
- Canibales politicos (Hitler y Stalin en Espana), Ediciones Quetzal, Mexico, 1941
- Ainsi fut assassiné Trotski, Editions Self, Paris, 1948
- La Vie et la Mort en U.R.S.S., Les Iles d'Or, Paris, 1950
- Comunista en Espana y antistalinista en la U.R.S.S., Editorial Guarania, Mexico, 1952
- Destin du XXe siècle, Les Iles d'Or, Paris, 1954
- Marx y la Russia de ayer y de hoy, Editorial Bases, Buenos Aires, 1956
- España, primer ensayo de democracia popular, Biblioteca de la Libertad, Buenos Aires, 1961
- El Imperio Soviético, Editions Claridad, Buenos Aires, 1969
- L'assassinat de Trotski, Julliard, Paris, 1970, et Livre de Poche, Paris, 1973, Prix Voltaire 1970
- El proceso de Moscú en Barcelona, Aymá S.A. Editora, Barcelona, 1973
- El revolucionario profesional, Aymá S.A. Editora, Barcelona, 1975
- Les communistes contre la révolution espagnole, Belfond, Paris, 1978
