= Andreu Nin =

Spanish journalist, activist and politician

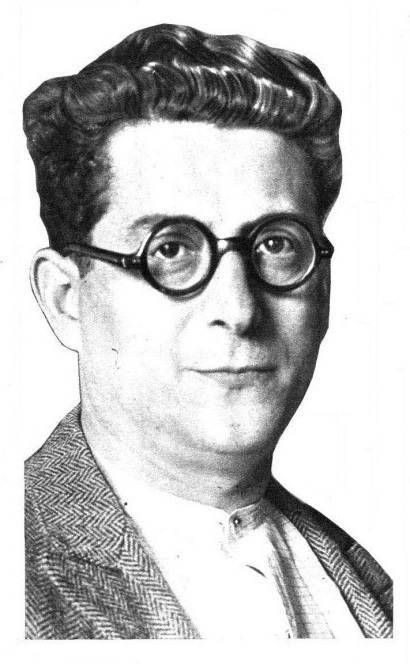

Minister of Justice of Catalonia
- In office 26 September 1936 – 17 December 1936
- President: Lluís Companys
- Vice President: Josep Tarradellas
- Preceded by: Josep Quero i Molares
- Succeeded by: Rafael Vidiella

Leader of the Workers' Party of Marxist Unification (POUM)
- In office 18 July 1936 – 20 June 1937
- Preceded by: Joaquim Maurín
- Succeeded by: Julián Gorkin

General Secretary of the Confederación Nacional del Trabajo
- In office March 1921 – May 1921
- Preceded by: Evelio Boal
- Succeeded by: Joaquim Maurín

Personal details
- Born: Andreu Nin i Pérez; 4 February 1892 El Vendrell, Tarragona, Spain
- Died: 20 June 1937 (aged 45) Alcalá de Henares, Madrid, Spain
- Party: Workers' Party of Marxist Unification (1935–1937)
- Other political affiliations: Spanish Socialist Workers' Party (1917); Confederación Nacional del Trabajo (1917–1922); Communist Party of the Soviet Union (1922–1930); Communist Left of Spain (1931–1935)
- Profession: Journalist, teacher, translator

Andreu Nin i Pérez (Spanish: Andrés Nin Pérez; 4 February 1892 – 20 June 1937) was a Spanish politician, trade unionist and translator. He is mainly known for his role in various Spanish left-wing movements of the early 20th century and, later, for his role in the Spanish Civil War. He is also known for his work translating Russian classics such as Ana Karenina, Crime and Punishment and some works by Anton Chekhov, from Russian into Catalan.

A teacher and journalist, during his youth he was involved in various political movements until he joined the anarchist Confederación Nacional del Trabajo (CNT). During his stay in Russia, he witnessed the Russian Revolution, which marked his conversion to Marxism. After his return to Spain, he later became one of the founders of the small but active Workers' Party of Marxist Unification (POUM). He eventually became a leading figure in Spanish revolutionary Marxism. He disappeared during the course of the Spanish Civil War, having been arrested by the Republican authorities following the "May Days".

== Biography ==
=== Early life ===
Born on 4 February 1892 in the Tarragona town of El Vendrell, the son of a cobbler and a peasant woman. Despite his modest origins, thanks to his parents' efforts and his intelligence, he managed to become a teacher and move to Barcelona shortly before World War I. Although he taught for a time in a secular, libertarian school, he soon turned to journalism and politics.

In 1911 he joined the ranks of the Catalan federalist movement, joining the Republican Nationalist Federal Union (UFNR), but the social unrest that existed at the time quickly led him to evolve towards more left-wing politics. The year 1917 was a key year in his life: events such as the August general strike, the Russian Revolution and the struggles between Barcelona's employers and the trade unions, especially the National Confederation of Labour (CNT), had a profound effect on him. Although he first joined the ranks of the Spanish Socialist Workers' Party (PSOE), he soon embraced the cause of revolutionary syndicalism and joined the CNT, where, after attending the second congress in 1919, he defended its membership of the Communist International and replaced Evelio Boal, who had been assassinated, as general secretary of the National Committee. In November 1920, Nin himself suffered an attack by the Sindicatos Libres that almost cost him his life.

=== Political activity ===
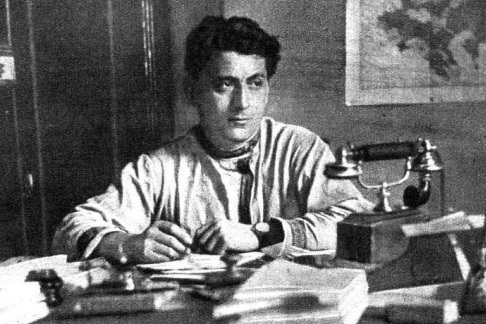
in Moscow Komintern office

At the CNT national plenary meeting held in Lleida on 28 April 1921, he was elected as one of the delegates to be sent to Moscow to the 3rd World Congress of the Communist International and the founding congress of the Red Trade Union International (Profintern) along with Joaquín Maurín, Hilario Arlandis and Jesús Ibáñez; becoming a key figure in both internationals (the CNT had left the Communist International in 1922). During his trip to Moscow he came to admire the Russian Revolution, after which he abandoned anarchism and became a Marxist. Nin, who was also to attend the second congress of the Profintern, lived for a time in Moscow, during which time he first worked for Nikolai Bukharin and later became the secretary of Leon Trotsky, one of the Bolshevik leaders during the revolution. Thanks to a job at the Profintern, Nin was able to visit France, Italy and Germany. From 1926 onwards, he belonged to the "Left Opposition" led by Trotsky, which opposed the rise of Joseph Stalin within the Communist Party of the Soviet Union, so Nin had to leave the USSR in 1930. He became fluent in the Russian language and later produced several Catalan translations of classic nineteenth-century Russian novelists.

==== Second Republic ====
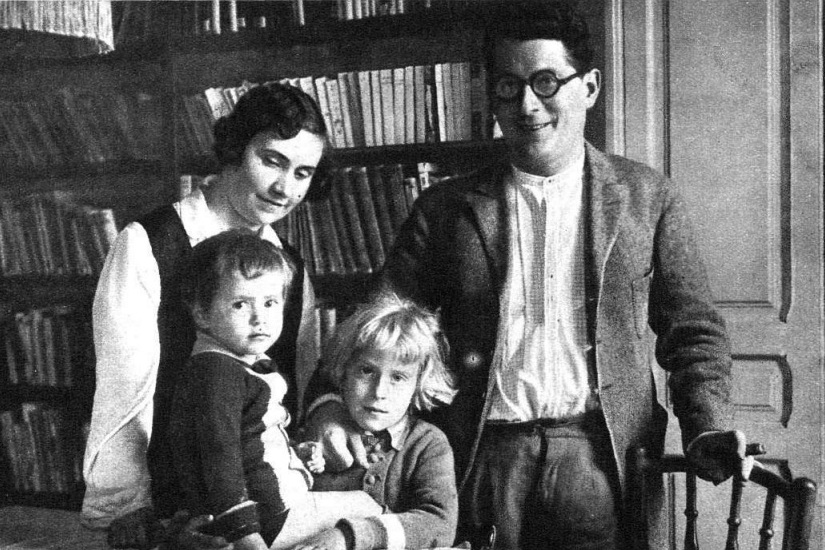
with wife and children

On his return to Spain after the proclamation of the Second Republic, Nin was instrumental in the formation of a Trotskyist group, the Communist Left of Spain (ICE), in May 1931. The ICE soon became a group affiliated to the International Left Opposition and went on to publish the newspaper El Soviet. Although it had some very prominent militants, the Communist Left was too small a group to have any real influence on Spanish political life. Although it was considered a Trotskyist party opposed to Stalin, from his exile in Norway, Trotsky himself sharply criticised its political line.

During the Revolution of 1934, he was a member of the Alianza Obrera and took part in the events of 6 October in Catalonia. After earlier criticism of his political line, he ended up breaking with Trotsky after he did not accept his attempt to adopt an entryist tactic in the PSOE. When his group merged with Joaquín Maurín's Workers and Peasants' Bloc (BOC) to found the Workers' Party of Marxist Unification (POUM) in 1935, Nin was appointed a member of the new party's executive committee and editor of its publication, La Nueva Era; the following year he was elected general secretary of the POUM.

In May 1936, he was also elected general secretary of the Workers' Federation of Trade Union Unity (FOUS), which had a strong trade union presence in the provinces of Lleida, Girona and also Tarragona.

==== Spanish Civil War ====
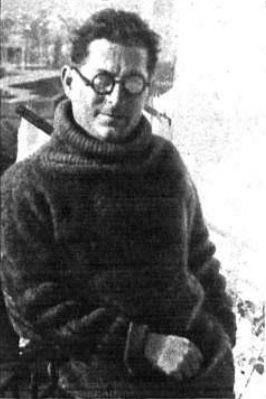
mid-1930s

After the outbreak of the Spanish Civil War, Andreu Nin became the leader of the POUM. Until July 1936, the party had a very limited presence in the Catalan political sphere and even less in the rest of Spain. From then on, Nin and other POUM leaders began to make themselves known outside their home provinces and often spoke out in public. On 2 August, in statements to the daily La Vanguardia, Nin declared:

The working class has solved the problem of the Church simply by not leaving even one of them standing.

After serving on the Consell d'Economia de Catalunya between August and September 1936, Nin was appointed Minister of Justice of the Generalitat on 26 September. On 14 October 1936 he introduced the People's Courts by decree. However, Nin's tenure as Minister of Justice was widely disputed. During those months extra-judicial executions continued to take place, without Nin taking action. As historian Hugh Thomas notes, "Nin had not been known for his humanitarian scruples towards the "bourgeoisie"". The POUM militias also contributed to the repression of 'fascists' and 'enemies of the people'. In the autumn, Nin had raised with the President of the Generalitat, Lluís Companys, the possibility of taking in as a refugee Leon Trotsky, who at that time had been forced to leave Norway under Soviet pressure. This idea was not to the liking of the Unified Socialist Party of Catalonia (PSUC), who also participated in the government of the Generalitat. On 24 November, the PSUC handed the CNT a proposal on the establishment of a new government of the Generalitat, which included the departure of Nin as Minister of Justice. Many anarchist members and leaders were not too fond of Nin, whom they considered a renegade from the CNT, and so they resolved that it was more a conflict between Marxists. Nin continued to hold the post until 16 December, when he was removed following a reshuffling of the council. When explaining the reasons, as Nin later recounted in his interrogation, Josep Tarradellas also warned him of the danger to both the POUM and its leaders.

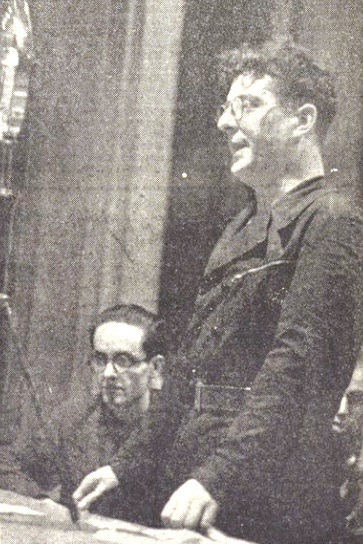
at POUM rally, civil war

During the spring of 1937 the Republican police located an alleged letter written by Nin to Francisco Franco, in which the Trotskyist leader was to endorse a plan for an uprising by the Madrid fifth column; the letter, in reality a forgery by the NKVD, constituted one of the main pieces of evidence against Nin. After the May Events, the Communist campaign against the POUM intensified. Its leaders were openly accused of being fascists and conspiring with Franco. As early as 28 May, Communist pressure got the authorities to suspend the circulation of the party's newspaper, La Batalla.

On 14 June the Director General of Security, Colonel Antonio Ortega Gutiérrez, informed the Minister of Education and Health that the head of the NKVD in Spain, Alexander Orlov, had indicated to him that all POUM leaders should be arrested. (Note: When the general secretary of the PCE, José Díaz Ramos, heard of this, he was deeply upset. He harshly criticised this idea and even clashed with the Comintern's representative in Spain, Victorio Codovilla. Díaz criticised the Soviets for acting in Spain as foreign agents.) The minister, who was the Communist Jesús Hernández Tomás, went to speak directly to Orlov about this matter. The NKVD chief claimed that there was evidence linking the Trotskyist party to Franco's espionage and that it was necessary for the government not to be aware of this plan because the Minister of the Interior, Julián Zugazagoitia, was a friend of some of the POUM leaders. On 16 June the Republican authorities closed down the POUM headquarters in the Hotel Falcón and the party leadership was arrested by the police. According to the testimony of Julián Gorkín, the Republican police were accompanied by two foreigners, whom Gorkín suspected of being Soviet secret service agents. Andreu Nin was separated from the rest of the party leadership, like Julián Gorkin and José Escuder, who were held in prisons in Madrid and Barcelona. After being separated from the rest, Nin disappeared.

=== Controversy about his death ===
Nin was transferred to the city of Alcalá de Henares, near Madrid; the location chosen had become an important Soviet base in Republican Spain and therefore offered guarantees of security. (Note: In March 2008, a mass grave was found by chance with the remains of five human bodies from the civil war period. At the time, it was suggested that one of the bodies might be that of Andreu Nin.) It has subsequently been claimed that Andreu Nin was subjected to interrogation and torture in the days following his arrest. Hugh Thomas notes that Nin was transported by car from Barcelona and then taken to the Cathedral of Alcalá de Henares, which functioned as a private prison of the Soviet NKVD. Some claim that he died in Alcalá de Henares. However, various circumstances surrounding his death, such as whether or not he was tortured before his execution, remain unclear. According to Paul Preston, Nin was possibly killed on 22 June by flaying, on Orlov's orders and with the help of Iosif Grigulevich. (Note: Many years later Orlov, after going into exile in the United States, tried to evade responsibility for Nin's death and blamed it on an alleged Soviet agent, called "Bolodin", who had come expressly from the USSR.) There is little doubt that the order for Nin's execution came from Moscow. Thomas, for his part, claims that he may have been killed in El Pardo park, near Madrid, but the final fate of his remains a mystery. Nin's biographer, Francesc Bonamusa, would comment on this:

The fundamental aspects of the kidnapping and subsequent assassination of Andreu Nin are clear. Nin was arrested by members of the police services in Madrid and Barcelona, not by police from Valencia, which was the seat of the government of the Republic. He was transferred first to Valencia and then to Madrid...once in Madrid, he was probably transferred to the counter-espionage services of the NKVD, and taken to one of their barracks in Alcalá de Henares or El Pardo. For these reasons, and given that Nin was not a government official, it was impossible for the Ministers of Justice, Manuel de Irujo, and of the Interior, Julián Zugazagoitia, to obtain information on the whereabouts of the former Minister of Justice of the Generalitat.

Within days of his arrest, rumours began to spread in Republican Spain that Andreu Nin had been assassinated. A campaign began with the slogan: "Where is Nin?" (Spanish: ¿Dónde está Nin?, Catalan: On és Nin?) The former Minister of Health, the anarchist Federica Montseny, was one of the first persons to raise the question in public. In the Republican government itself they were not quite sure what had happened: several Socialist ministers questioned the two Communist ministers, who claimed not to know anything about the affair. The semi-official version that began to circulate was that Nin had been liberated from Checa by "his friends in the Gestapo". (Note: According to Hugh Thomas, the Soviets staged a farce in which they used German members of the International Brigades posing as Nazi Gestapo agents.) This was claimed by Juan Negrín, head of the Republican government. Some Communists replied "In Salamanca or Berlin", referring to Salamanca, the early headquarters of the Nationalists. According to Ricardo Miralles and Hugh Thomas, Negrín would have been aware of the truth about what had happened from the beginning despite echoing the Gestapo's implausible version; Thomas adds that the Nin case was in fact a 'dirty affair', but that the Republican officials decided it was better not to bother the Soviets in order to continue receiving the precious military aid. On the other hand, Republican leaders and ministers did not particularly like the leader of this small party, which they regarded as a mere "group of agitators who were damaging the war effort". Julián Zugazagoitia, however, commented that this action had been carried out without the knowledge and/or consent of the Republican government. In February 1938 a hit-squad related to POUM and Sección Bolchevique-Leninista de España shot a Soviet agent held responsible for the detention of Nin, Leon Narwicz.

== Sources ==
- Alba, Víctor (1975). Dos revolucionarios, Andreu Nin, Joaquín Maurin (in Spanish). Madrid: Seminarios y Ediciones. ISBN 84-299-0074-8.
- Alba, Víctor (1983). The Communist Party in Spain. New Brunswick: Transaction Books. ISBN 0-87855-464-5.
- Alexander, Robert J. (1999). The Anarchists in the Spanish Civil War. Vol. 2. Janus Publishing Company. ISBN 978-1857564129 – via Google Books.
- Gallego, Ferran (2008) [2007]. La crisis del antifascismo: Barcelona, mayo de 1937 (in Spanish). Barcelona: DeBOLS!LLO. ISBN 978-84-8346-598-1.
- Gutiérrez-Álvarez, Pepe (2009). Un Ramo de rosas rojas y una foto. Variaciones sobre el proceso del POUM (in Spanish). Barcelona: Laertes. ISBN 978-84-7584-655-2.
- Gutiérrez-Alvarez, Pepe (2015). Retratos poumistas (in Spanish). Seville: Ediciones Espuela de Plata. ISBN 978-84-96133-71-6.
- Martins, Laura M. (2014). New Readings in Latin American and Spanish Literary and Cultural Studies. Cambridge Scholars publishing. ISBN 978-1443855372.
- Meaker, Gerald H. (1974). The Revolutionary Left in Spain, 1914-1923. Stanford: Stanford University Press. ISBN 0-8047-0845-2.
- Miralles, Ricardo (2003). Juan Negrín. La República en guerra. Madrid: Temas de hoy. ISBN 9788484603016.
- Navarra, Andreu (2021). La revolución imposible. Vida y muerte de Andreu Nin. Barcelona: Tusquets. ISBN 978-84-1107-002-7.
- Pagès, Pelai (2009). Andreu Nin. Una vida al servei de la classe obrera. Barcelona: Laertes. ISBN 978-8475846446.
- Payne, Stanley G. (2004). The Spanish Civil War, the Soviet Union, and Communism. New Haven: Yale University Press. ISBN 0-300-10068-X.
- Preston, Paul (2004). La Guerra Civil Española. Debolsillo. ISBN 9788499891507.
- Preston, Paul (2011). El holocausto español. Translated by Martínez Muñoz, Catalina; Vázquez Nacarino, Eugenia. Barcelona: Círculo de Lectores. ISBN 978-84-672-4533-2.
- Radosh, Ronald; Habeck, Mary R.; Nikolaevič Sevost'ânov, Grigorij (2001). Spain Betrayed: The Soviet Union in the Spanish Civil War. Yale University Press. pp. 208–09. ISBN 0300089813 – via Google Books.
- Redondo, Gonzalo (1993). Historia de la Iglesia en España, 1931-1939: La Guerra Civil, 1936-1939 (in Spanish). Ediciones Rialp. ISBN 9788432130168.
- Rourera Farré, Luis (1992). Joaquín Maurín y su Tiempo. Vida y obras de un luchador. Claret. ISBN 9788472637962.
- Ruipérez, María (1979). "Andreu Nin: Un revolucionario en el recuerdo" (PDF). Tiempo de historia (60): 14–29.
- Sennett, Alan (2014). Revolutionary Marxism in Spain, 1930-1937. Leiden: Brill. ISBN 978-90-04-22107-9.
- Solano, Wilebaldo (1999). El POUM en la historia: Andreu Nin y la revolución española. Madrid: Los Libros de la Catarata. ISBN 9788483190593. Archived from the original on 18 September 2011.
- Solano, Wilebaldo (2006). Biografía breve de Andreu Nin. Madrid: Sepha. ISBN 978-84-934837-7-7.
- Thomas, Hugh (1976). Historia de la Guerra Civil Española. Barcelona: Círculo de Lectores. ISBN 84-226-0874-X.
- Viñas, Ángel (22 April 2007). "Un agente estalinista, cerebro del asesinato de Nin". El País.

Preceded by Evelio Boal	General Secretary of the CNT 1921	Succeeded by Joaquín Maurín

Preceded by Joaquín Maurín	Leader of the POUM 1936-1937	Succeeded by Julián Gorkin
