= Workers' and Peasants' Bloc =

Far-left political party in Spain from 1931 to 1935

Workers' and Peasants' Bloc Bloc Obrer i Camperol Bloque Obrero y Campesino
- Abbreviation: BOC
- General secretary: Joaquín Maurín
- Founded: 1931
- Dissolved: 1935
- Merger of: Catalan-Balearic Communist Federation (FCCB); Catalan Communist Party (PCC)
- Merged into: Workers' Party of Marxist Unification (POUM)
- Headquarters: Barcelona
- Ideology: Communism; Revolutionary socialism Catalonia's self-determination
- Political position: Far-left

The Workers' and Peasants' Bloc (Catalan: Bloc Obrer i Camperol, BOC, Spanish: Bloque Obrero y Campesino, BOC) was a "Right Opposition" communist group in Spain, centered in Catalonia.

== History ==
BOC poster

BOC was founded in Barcelona in 1931, as the mass front of the Catalan-Balearic Communist Federation (FCCB), after the merger of the Catalan Communist Party into FCCB. FCCB, which made up the nucleus of BOC, later changed its name to Iberian Communist Federation, thus stating its intention to expand itself and BOC throughout Spain. Prominent leaders of BOC were Joaquín Maurín, Hilari Arlandis, Jordi Arquer, Pere Bonet, Víctor Colomer, Abelard Tona Nadalmai and Àngel Estivill. In November 1935, the majority of BOC merged with the Trotskyist Communist Left of Spain (ICE) to form the Workers' Party of Marxist Unification (POUM; Catalan: Partit Obrer d'Unificació Marxista). The minority stayed out of the merger and later joined the Unified Socialist Party of Catalonia (PSUC).

== Publications ==
The central publication of BOC was La Batalla. BOC also published L'Hora and El Front in Barcelona, L'Espurna in Girona and Avant in Lleida.
