= Communist Left of Spain =

Far-left political party in Spain from 1931 to 1936

Communist Left of Spain Izquierda Comunista de España
- Abbreviation: ICE
- General secretary: Andreu Nin i Pérez
- Founded: 1931
- Dissolved: 1935
- Merged into: Workers' Party of Marxist Unification
- Headquarters: Barcelona
- Ideology: Communism; Trotskyism; Revolutionary socialism
- Political position: Far-left

Communist Left of Spain (Spanish: Izquierda Comunista de España, ICE) was a Trotskyist political party during the Second Spanish Republic. Its leader was Andreu Nin, who had been a supporter of the Left Opposition while living in Russia.

Although the group was affiliated to the Left Opposition, Leon Trotsky objected to its name, believing that it failed to stress that the organisation viewed itself as an external faction of the Communist Party of Spain. By April 1936, on the brink of the Spanish Civil War, Trotsky had denounced the Spanish left communists:

At present we must say openly that the Spanish “left communists” have allowed this extremely favorable interval to pass by completely and have revealed themselves as in no way better than the socialist and “communist” traitors. Really, there has been no lack of warnings! All the greater is the culpability of an Andres Nin, of an Andrade, etc. – With a correct policy the “Communist Left”, as a section of the Fourth International, might have been at the head of the Spanish proletariat today. Instead of this, it vegetates in the confused organization of a Maurin – without program, without perspective, and without any political importance.

It merged with the Right Opposition communist party Bloque Obrero y Campesino in September 1935, to form the Workers' Party of Marxist Unification (POUM), which was also led by Nin until his kidnapping and death at the hands of NKVD in 1937.
