= POUM =

Spanish far-left political party (1935–1980)

Workers' Party of Marxist Unification Partido Obrero de Unificación Marxista
- Catalan name: Partit Obrer d'Unificació Marxista
- Abbreviation: POUM
- Leader: Joaquín Maurín (1935–1936); Andreu Nin (1936–1937); Julián Gorkin (1937–1939); Wilebaldo Solano (1947–1980)
- Founder: Joaquín Maurín; Andreu Nin
- Founded: 1935
- Dissolved: 1980 (unofficially)
- Merger of: Communist Left of Spain; Workers' and Peasants' Bloc
- Headquarters: Hotel Rivoli Rambla, Barcelona
- Newspaper: La Batalla
- Youth wing: Iberian Communist Youth
- Membership (1936): ~30,000–70,000
- Ideology: Communism; Socialism; Marxism; Centrist Marxism; Impossibilism; Anti-Stalinism; Factions: Libertarian socialism Trotskyism; Left communism Right-oppositionism; Catalonia's self-determination
- Political position: Far-left
- National affiliation: Popular Front; Left Bloc for National Liberation
- International affiliation: International Revolutionary Marxist Centre
- Colors: Red

Party flag

The Workers' Party of Marxist Unification (Spanish: Partido Obrero de Unificación Marxista, POUM; Catalan: Partit Obrer d'Unificació Marxista, POUM) was a Spanish Centrist Marxist and Impossibilist communist party formed during the Second Republic and mainly active in Catalonia and the Valencian Country around the Spanish Civil War. It was formed by the fusion of the Trotskyist Communist Left of Spain (Izquierda Comunista de España, ICE) and the Workers and Peasants' Bloc (BOC, affiliated with the Right Opposition) against the will of Leon Trotsky, with whom the former broke.

== Formation ==
In 1935, POUM was formed as a communist opposition to the Stalinist form of communism promoted by the Soviet Union, by the revolutionaries Andreu Nin and Joaquín Maurín. Nin was profoundly influenced by the thinking of Leon Trotsky, particularly his permanent revolution thesis. It resulted from the merging of the Communist Party's Left Opposition (the Trotskyist Communist Left of Spain) and the Right Opposition (the Workers and Peasants' Bloc). This alliance was against the wishes of Trotsky, with whom the Communist Left of Spain broke. In his writings on the Spanish Revolution, Trotsky would elaborate on his criticisms of the POUM such as their abandonment of the Left Opposition program in favour of reformism to retain tactical advantage among other political tendencies.

== Position ==
A c. 1936 POUM poster appeals to workers: "Obreros ¡A la victoria!" ("Workers: to Victory!").

The party grew larger than the official Communist Party of Spain (PCE) nationally and in the communist hotbeds of Catalonia and the Valencian Country, where the Unified Socialist Party of Catalonia (PSUC) represented the PCE. The POUM was highly critical of the popular front strategy advocated by Joseph Stalin and the Communist International (Comintern) but it participated in the Spanish Popular Front initiated by Manuel Azaña, leader of Acción Republicana. The POUM attempted to implement some of its radical policies as part of the Popular Front government but they were resisted by the more centrist factions. George Orwell fought in the POUM in the civil war and reported that its membership was roughly 10,000 in July 1936, 70,000 in December 1936, and 40,000 in June 1937, although he notes that the numbers are from POUM sources and are probably exaggerated.

== Conflict with the PCE and PSUC ==
The POUM's independent communist position, including opposition to Stalin, caused huge ruptures with the PCE, which remained fiercely loyal to the Comintern. Moreover, these divisions, which included accusations of Trotskyism (and even fascism) by the communists, resulted in actual fighting between their supporters; most notably, in 1937, a primarily communist coalition of government forces attacked the POUM during the Barcelona May Days. While the larger Confederación Nacional del Trabajo (National Confederation of Labour, CNT) supported the POUM at first, the moderate leadership of the CNT dropped its support after it joined the government. Radical elements within the anarchist movement however fought side by side in the streets of Barcelona during the May Days and were isolated as well, like the Friends of Durruti. The POUM, along with the purely Trotskyist Seccion Bolshevik-Leninista, became isolated, and both organizations were driven underground. Nin was detained and presumably tortured to death by NKVD agents in Alcalá de Henares, Nin and his party were consistently labeled as provocateurs in Stalinist propaganda.

== International links ==
The POUM was a member of the London Bureau of socialist and centrist Marxist parties that rejected both the reformism of the Second International and the pro-Moscow orientation of the Comintern. Other members included the Independent Labour Party in Britain, the Workers and Peasants' Socialist Party (PSOP) in France, and Poale Zion. Its youth wing was affiliated to the International Bureau of Revolutionary Youth Organizations, through which it recruited the ILP Contingent in the Civil War. Foreign supporters of POUM during the Civil War included Lois Orr.

== Transition era ==
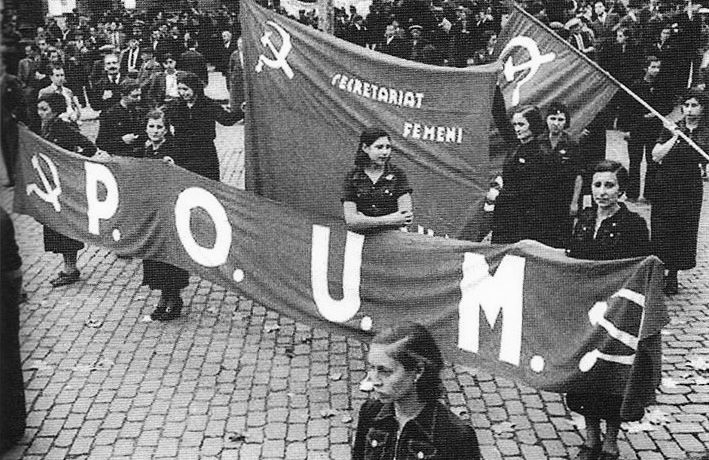
POUM demonstration on the 19th anniversary of the October Revolution, 1936

During the Spanish transition to democracy, the POUM was legalized in 1977. This led to a split in the party, with one faction opposing formal legalization, calling for a boycott of the 1977 general election and demanding the immediate restoration of the republic. The legalized party participated in the election as part of the Front for Workers' Unity (FUT), a coalition of parties and organizations to the left of the PCE which won 0.22% of the nationwide vote. The election result led to a crisis for the POUM as well as for most parties to the left of the PCE, from which it was not able to recover.

The POUM continued to exist as a small party with an office in Barcelona and a monthly newspaper, La Batalla, calling for cooperation among the various far-left parties, but an attempted merger with Communist Action and the Collective for Marxist Unification failed during a "Unification Congress" in 1978. After this setback, the POUM decided not to participate in the 1979 elections. POUM branches in several cities became part of local coalitions and unification attempts with various far-left groups. In 1980, the POUM made its last electoral efforts, supporting Herri Batasuna in the Basque country and participating in the Left Bloc for National Liberation (BEAN - Unitat Popular) coalition in the Catalan parliamentary election, but the party was disintegrating. La Batalla ceased publication in May 1980, marking the end of the POUM as an organized party, though it was never officially dissolved. As a last remnant, the Valencia branch remained active until 1981. Former members of the POUM formed the Fundación Andreu Nin (Andreu Nin Foundation) to preserve the heritage of their party and ideological current.

== Cultural references ==
British author George Orwell fought alongside members of the Independent Labour Party as part of POUM militias; he recounted the experience in his book Homage to Catalonia. Likewise, the film Land and Freedom, directed by Ken Loach, tells of a group of POUM soldiers fighting in the war from the perspective of a member of the Communist Party of Great Britain who initially fought for the POUM before he later joined his CPGB comrades in the International Brigades. In particular, the film goes on to deal with his disillusionment with the Soviet Union's policies in the war while he was fighting with the International Brigades, after which he decided to return to his POUM comrades shortly before the POUM's June 1937 suppression.

The POUM is briefly mentioned in Joe Haldeman's science fiction novel The Forever War as a militia where "(y)ou obeyed an order only after it had been explained in detail; you could refuse if it didn't make sense."

Victor Serge dedicates Midnight in the Century to Andreu Nin and other slain leaders of the POUM.

Discussion of POUM in Hemingway's For Whom the Bell Tolls (Collier edition, p. 247).

In William Herrick's novel "Hermanos!", the American communist protagonist comes to Spain in order to fight Fascism, but gets diverted into hunting down members of POUM. The POUM activists which the protagonist tortures and executes are depicted very sympathetically, shown bravely defiant and sticking to their positions to the bitter end - eventually causing the protagonist to undergo a crisis of conscience, break with the Party and become a dissident himself.

Ian Fleming's From Russia with Love (Signet edition, p. 50) states that Rosa Klebb infiltrated the POUM and may have murdered Andrés Nin Pérez.

In Margaret Atwood's prize-winning novel, The Blind Assassin, a fictional newspaper account details the actual battles between the POUM and the Stalin-backed communists in Barcelona; the title of the newspaper article is Red Vendetta in Barcelona and mentions the purges against the POUM by Stalinist communists "well armed by Russia".

== See also ==
- Iberian Communist Youth
- Iberian Anarchist Federation
- Homage to Catalonia - George Orwell's book about his time with the POUM
- Pilar Santiago
- Revolutionary Workers' Party (Spain)
- Land and Freedom - Ken Loach's movie about a story of POUM's militants
- The Man Who Loved Dogs - Leonardo Padura Fuentes' novel about Trotsky's murderer
