= International Left Opposition =

- Abbreviation: ILO
- Founder: Leon Trotsky
- Founded: 6 April 1930 International Left Opposition; September 1933 Internationalist Communist League
- Dissolved: 1936
- Split from: Comintern
- Merged into: Fourth International
- Ideology: Communism; Anti-Stalinism
- Political position: Far-left

The International Left Opposition (ILO), officially the International Left Opposition (Bolshevik-Leninists), was an organisation founded by Leon Trotsky in 1930.

Initially founded as an opposition group within the Comintern, the ILO became an independent organisation following the expulsion of its members (and suspected members) from the international. The ILO was renamed to the Internationalist Communist League (ICL), officially the Internationalist Communist League (Bolshevik-Leninists) in September 1933, and was merged into the Movement for the Fourth International in July 1936. This group formed the basis of the Fourth International, founded in Paris in 1938.

== History ==
Leon Trotsky was a founding part of the Third International in 1919, and during the 1920s factional struggles in the Soviet Union operated as part of a faction in the international. By the early 1930s, Trotsky and his supporters believed that Stalin's influence over the Third International could still be fought from within and slowly rolled back. The International Left Opposition was formally established on 6 April 1930, which was intended to be a group within the Third International. Stalin's supporters, who dominated the International, would no longer tolerate dissent. All Trotskyists, and those suspected of being influenced by Trotskyism, were expelled.

A further meeting was held on 4-8 February 1933 to prepare for a full conference of the ILO, which was scheduled for July 1933 but a full conference would not be organised until 1936. This meeting did several things: first it reorganised the internal structure of the group; second it adopted a series of ideas called the "Eleven Points" which Robert J. Alexander called points: "that were largely to constitute the ideological and programmatic basis of International Trotskyism for the next half century."; and third, the group called on a united front to be formed by the SPD, the KPD, and the German proletariat against Adolf Hitler who had become Chancellor of Germany in January 1933. The ILO also sent a telegram to the Comintern urging cooperation against German fascism. Trotsky claimed that the Third Period policies of the Comintern had contributed to the rise of Adolf Hitler in Germany, and that its turn to a popular front policy (aiming to unite all ostensibly anti-fascist forces) sowed illusions in reformism and pacifism and "clear[ed] the road for a fascist overturn".

Further meetings were held in May and August 1933, in which the ILO first called for the creation of a new German communist party and then the creation of a new communist international and communist parties in countries. The ILO changed its name to the Internationalist Communist League (Bolshevik-Leninists) in a September meeting.

The ILO sent observers to an August 1933 meeting of the London Bureau, and attempted to propose the idea for a new international, but this was rejected and led to the publishing of "The Declaration of the Four on the Need for and Bases of a New International", which was also known as the "Declaration of Four". This document was signed by Jacob Walcher of the Socialist Workers' Party of Germany, Henk Sneevliet of the Dutch Revolutionary Socialist Party and Piet J. Schmidt of the Independent Socialist Party (Netherlands). Of those, two soon distanced themselves from the agreement, but the Revolutionary Socialist Party worked with the International Left Opposition to declare the International Communist League. This falling out occurred at a December 1933 meeting between the three parties and members of the ICL.

In June 1934, Trotsky first proposed entryism through the idea of the French turn, seen by historian Robert J. Alexander as "an issue which would plague the international Trotskyist movement for the next half-century:".

In 1935, Trotsky wrote an Open Letter for the Fourth International, reaffirming the Declaration of Four, while documenting the recent course of the Comintern and the Socialist International. In the letter, he called for the urgent formation of a Fourth International. Trotsky held a conference in July 1936 in Paris, but was said to have been held in Geneva for security reasons. This merged the ICL into the Movement for the Fourth International, which was done as a compromise since Trotsky had wanted this meeting to be the founding congress of the Fourth International.

Trotsky's position was contested by Andrés Nin and some other members of the League who did not support the call for a new International. This group prioritised regroupment with other communist oppositions, principally the International Communist Opposition (ICO), linked to the Right Opposition in the Soviet Party, a regroupment which eventually led to the formation of the International Bureau for Revolutionary Socialist Unity. Trotsky considered those organisations to be centrist. Despite Trotsky, the Spanish section merged with the Spanish section of ICO, forming the Workers' Party of Marxist Unification (POUM). Trotsky claimed the merger was to be a capitulation to centrism.

== Membership ==
Source: Year indicates when they joined.

- Brazil: Communist League (1931)
- Chile: Communist Left (1933-1937), Revolutionary Labour Party (1935) (Note: A minority of the Communist Left opposed merging into the Socialist Party and formed their own group loyal to the ILO initially called the Bolshevik-Leninist Group before renaming to the POR in 1937)
- Czechoslovakia: Communist Party of Czechoslovakia (Opposition) (1932)
- France: Communist League (1930)
- United States: Communist League of America (1930)

== See also ==
- Left Opposition
