= Jef Last =

Dutch writer (1898–1972)

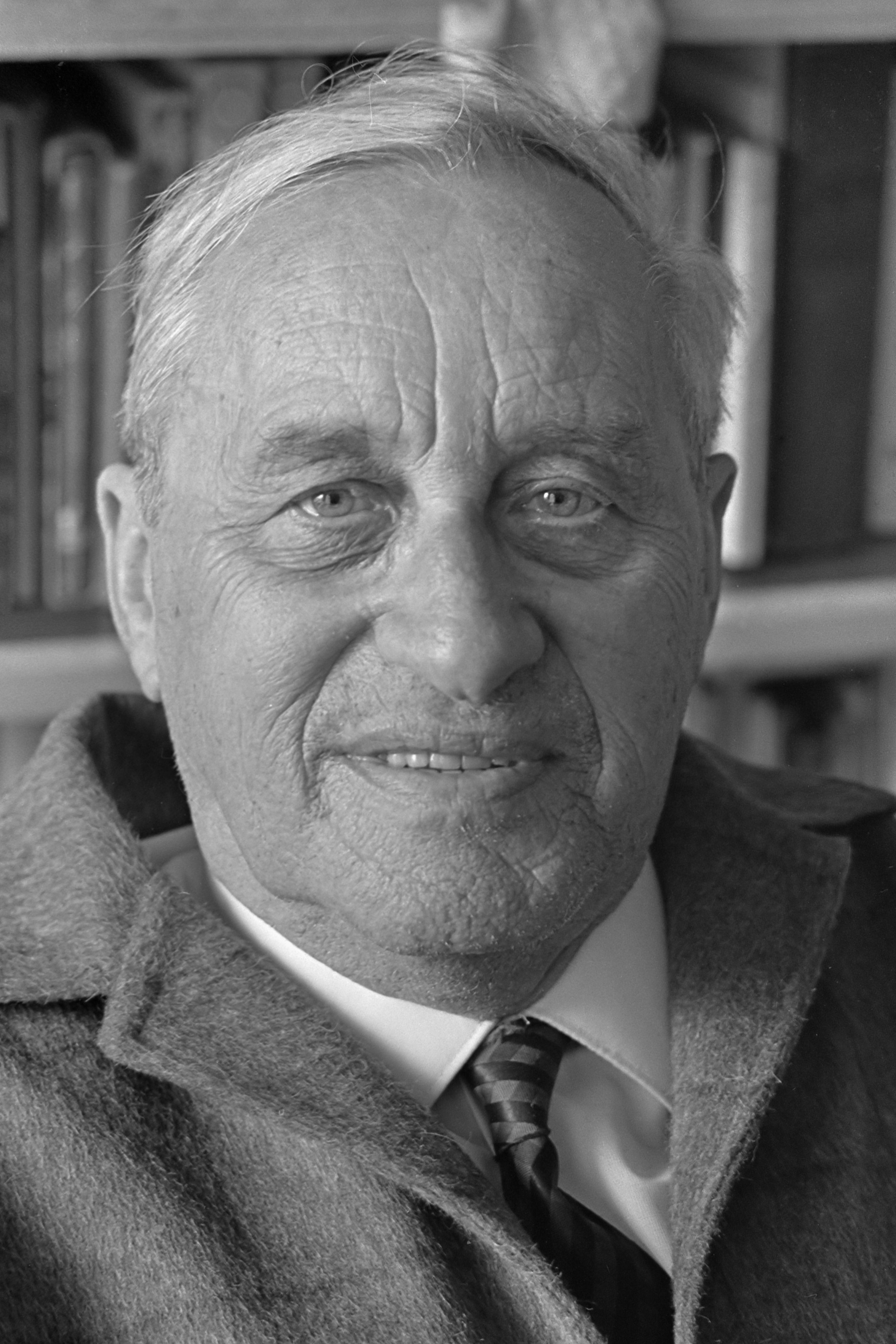
- Jef Last (1968)
- Born: 2 May 1898; The Hague, Netherlands
- Died: 15 February 1972 (aged 73); Laren, Netherlands
- Occupations: Poet, writer
- Website: www.jeflast.nl

Josephus Carel Franciscus (Jef) Last (2 May 1898 in The Hague – 15 February 1972 in Laren) was a Dutch poet, writer, translator and cosmopolitan.

Jef Last was a writer and socially compassionate man. Having a Protestant father and a Catholic mother, he was raised in the Protestant tradition. However, he was already a member of the SDAP and the "AJC" at a very young age. With these principles, he could not practice as an assistant manager of the Enka in Ede, leading to his resignation.

He left the revisionist social democracy to become a member of Henk Sneevliet's Revolutionary Socialist Party. With his revolutionary friend André Gide, he traveled in the summer of 1936 to the Soviet Union. The pair was well received, but saw through the organized tribute and returned to the west disillusioned. Last wrote a book about his friendship with Gide.

He last fought in the Spanish Civil War in the International Brigades, fighting on the side of the Spanish Republic. As a result, he lost his Dutch citizenship because of his military service to a foreign power. Shortly after the Second World War, his citizenship was returned due to his participation in the Dutch resistance.

From 1950 to 1953, he lived in Indonesia, particularly in Singaraja (Bali), where he worked as a teacher at a secondary school. He was friends with the country’s president Sukarno and Mohammad Hatta.

== Family ==
He was married to Ida ter Haar (1893-1982) from 1923, whom he divorced and later remarried. They had three daughters. Jef was known as a bisexual. He was a co-founder of the homosexual emancipation Shakespeare Club, the forerunner of the COC.

The last years of his life were spent in the Rosa Spier Huis in Laren. After his death, his body was made available to science.

== Work ==
- 1926 – Bakboordslichten (poetry)
- 1930 – Branding
- 1930 – Kameraden! (poetry)
- 1930 – Marianne
- 1932 – Liefde in de portieken
- 1932 – Verleden tijd (poetry)
- 1933 – Onder de koperen ploert
- 1933 – Partij remise
- 1933 – Twee werelden (poetry)
- 1933 – De vlucht van den opstandeling
- 1934 – Zuiderzee
- 1935 – Een huis zonder vensters
- 1935 – Voor de mast
- 1936 – Brieven uit Spanje
- 1936 – De bevrijde Eros. Een ketter in moorenland en andere gedichten (poetry)
- 1936 – Een flirt met den duivel
- 1937 – Bloedkoraal (poetry)
- 1937 – In de loopgraven voor Madrid
- 1937 – De Spaansche tragedie (The Spanish tragedy/Spanish Front. Writers on the Civil War)
- 1938 – De laatste waarheid
- 1939 – Kruisgang der jeugd; with Harry Wilde
- 1939 – De vliegende Hollander
- 1940 – Kinderen van de middernachtzon
- 1940 – Onvoldoende voor de liefde
- 1941 – Van een jongen die een man werd part I and II (youth work in 1919, at the time not published)
- 1941 – Elfstedentocht
- 1942 – Leeghwater maalt de meren leeg
- 1944 – Tau Kho Tau (poetry)
- 1945 – Een socialistische renaissance
- 1945 – Het eerste schip op de Newa (The first ship up the Neva)
- 1946 – Oog in oog (poetry)
- 1947 – Vingers van de linkerhand
- 1949 – In de zevende hemel
- 1950 – Schuim op de kust
- 1951 – De rode en de witte lotus
- 1953 – Inleiding tot het denken van Confucius
- 1955 – Bali in de kentering
- 1956 – Zo zag ik Indonesië
- 1957 – Een lotje uit de loterij
- 1958 – I Bontot en I Koese. De avonturen van twee Balische jongens; with Udeyana Pandji Tisna (The John Day Company)
- 1959 – Lu Hsün. Dichter und Idol
- 1960 – Japan in kimono en overall
- 1960 – Tegen de draad (poetry)
- 1960 – Vloog een bloesem terug naar haar tak
- 1962 – De Spaanse tragedie
- 1962 – Golven der Gele Rivier
- 1962 – De jeugd van Judas (The boyhood of Judas; in: The fifth Acolyte Reader, Meppel 1991)
- 1965 – China, land van de eeuwige omwenteling
- 1966 – De tweede dageraad van Japan
- 1966 – Mijn vriend André Gide
- 1967 – Rinus van der Lubbe, doodstraf voor een provo (edited reissue of Kruisgang der jeugd)
- 1968 – Strijd, handel en zeeroverij. De Hollandse tijd op Formosa
- 1970 – Vuurwerk achter de Chinese muur
- 1972 – Tjoebek in het tijgerbos (children's book)
- 1973 – De zeven Caramboles; under pseudonym Co Mantjens, second edition with subtitel: De postume pornoroman van Jef Last
