= Revolutionary Socialist Party (Netherlands) =

Defunct political party in the Netherlands

Revolutionary Socialist Party Revolutionair Socialistische Partij
- Leader: Henk Sneevliet
- Chairman: Piet J. Schmidt (RSAP)
- Founded: 1929
- Dissolved: 1940
- Split from: Communist Party Holland
- Preceded by: Socialist Party
- Succeeded by: Marx–Lenin–Luxemburg Front (clandestine)
- Headquarters: Amsterdam
- Newspaper: De Baanbreker (1929-1935); De Nieuwe Fakkel (1935-1938)
- Ideology: Left communism Marxism; Republicanism; Anti-imperialism; Factions: Trotskyism; Syndicalism; Anarcho-communism; Council communism
- International affiliation: International Communist League (1930-1935); International Revolutionary Marxist Centre (1935-1940)
- Colors: Red
- House of Representatives (1933-1937): 1 / 100

The Revolutionary Socialist Party (Dutch: Revolutionair Socialistische Partij or RSP) was a Dutch socialist political party, that has been variously characterized as Trotskyist and syndicalist. In 1935 it merged with the Independent Socialist Party (OSP) to form the Revolutionary Socialist Workers' Party (Dutch: Revolutionair Socialistische Arbeiderspartij, RSAP), but most of the former OSP members left the united party the same year. Henk Sneevliet was the RSP/RSAP's undisputed leader throughout its existence, as well as its only Representative.

== Party history ==
=== Predecessors ===
The oldest predecessor of the Revolutionary Socialist Party is the Revolutionary Socialist Union (Dutch: Revolutionair Socialistisch Verbond, RSV), a group of dissidents from the Communist Party Holland (CPH) led by Henk Sneevliet. Another predecessor is the Socialist Party (Dutch: Socialistische Partij, SP), a syndicalist party, which was closely linked to the anarcho-syndicalist trade union National Labor Secretariat (NAS).

=== Foundation ===
In 1929 former members of both the Revolutionary Socialist Union and the Socialist Party founded the Revolutionary Socialist Party. Both parties opposed both the reformist social-democracy of the SDAP and the CPH. A leading person in the foundation was Henk Sneevliet, a prominent former member of CPH and an associate of Leon Trotsky. The Central Intelligence Service, the Dutch secret service at the time, attributed the foundation of the RSP to Sneevliets personal need for power and glory, from which he was blocked in the CPH which distrusted the "Trotskyite" Sneevliet.

=== 1929–1935: RSP ===
The RSP entered in the 1929 elections but was unable to win a seat, due to heavy opposition of the CPH and the Communist Party of Holland-Central Committee, an opposition group that had left the CPH. Just before the 1933 elections Sneevliet was apprehended for supporting the mutiny on the De Zeven Provinciën. The RSP saw the mutiny as part of the liberation of the Dutch Indies. The RSP raised a large campaign with slogans as: "From the Cell to Parliament", "Make Sneevliet the public prosecutor in the House of Representatives" and "I accuse" (a clear reference to Émile Zola's "J'accuse"). The campaign worked and the party won one seat, which was taken by Sneevliet, who was consequently released from prison. The position in parliament was mainly used to propagandise.

=== 1935–1940: RSAP ===
In 1935 the RSP and the Independent Socialist Party (OSP) merged to form the Revolutionary Socialist Workers' Party (RSAP). The OSP saw this as a way to gain seats in the next election, while the RSP saw it as a way to strengthen its basis. Although the OSP had more members, the RSP, which had one MP, was far stronger. Sneevliet remained the party's sole MP, while OSP leader Piet Schmidt became the party chairman. Sneevliet also became secretary of the party-board. Internal tensions between former members of the RSP and OSP caused the downfall of the party. In 1935 a group of former OSP'ers left the party to found the League of Revolutionary Socialists. The direct reason for this split was the question which group of left-wing German refugees the party should ally with. In 1936 Schmidt was expelled, after he had publicly criticized the Moscow Trials as show trials. Sneevliet took the position of chair. Schmidt's sympathy for democracy and his fear of totalitarian dictatorship was the direct reason of this split. In the elections of 1937 the party was unable to win any seats. After these elections the party received more opposition from the Dutch government: civil servants were forbidden to be member of NAS or the RSAP and prominent members of the RSAP were persecuted for insulting 'friendly heads of state' like Hitler. The communist CPN which had gained strength after several purges, also campaigned strongly against the "Trotskyite counterrevolutionary sect". Strong arm squads of the CPN attacked several prominent RSAP-members. Finally Trotsky and Sneevliet entered in an ideological conflict, cutting the RSAP off from its international contacts.

=== Dissolution: MLL ===
One day before the Dutch capitulation, May 14, 1940, the RSAP was officially dissolved. In 1938 it was already secretly decided that if the Germans would invade, the RSAP would dissolve and go underground. The party was reformed into the resistance organization Marx-Lenin-Luxemburg Front. As such it supported the February strike. In 1942 Sneevliet was executed. This prevented the re-foundation of the RSP after the Second World War.

The party's third way between authoritarian stalinism and social-democracy would later be reflected in the left-socialist Pacifist Socialist Party, which was also founded by former members of the communist CPN and the social-democratic PvdA.

=== Legacy ===
The Socialists, a far-left splinter faction from the Socialist Party, renamed themselves the Revolutionary Socialist Party in May 2025.

== Ideology and issues ==
The RSP was a left-communist party, which opposed both the authoritarian stalinism of the CPH and the moderate reformism of the SDAP. It united all kinds of groups that did not feel welcome within the CPH and SDAP: Leninists, Orthodox Marxists, Council communists and Anarcho-socialists. The party's main goal was the proletarian world revolution, which would replace the capitalist system by a system of workers' councils. In the end this would result in a communist society, where exploitation and class would be eliminated.

It also had several concrete issues it campaigned on:

- Government intervention to combat unemployment and government subsidies for the unemployed;
- Abolition of Dutch monarchy and the Senate;
- Amnesty for all political prisoners and conscientious objectors;
- Replacing the army by a system of workers' militia;
- Equal treatment of men and women;
- Betting working conditions for workers: a 6-hour workdays, special protection of female and young workers, a ban on night work and an obligatory vacation;
- A minimum wage;
- Old age pensions from the age 55;
- Decolonization of the Dutch Indies.

== Representation ==
This table shows the RSP's results in elections to the House of Representatives and Senate, as well as the party's political leadership: the fractievoorzitter, is the chair of the parliamentary party and the lijsttrekker is the party's top candidate in the general election, these posts are normally taken by the party's leader.

Year	HoR	S	Lijsttrekker	Fractievoorzitter	Cabinet
1929	0	0	not applicable	Henk Sneevliet	opposition
1930	0	0	not applicable	no elections	opposition
1931	0	0	not applicable	no elections	opposition
1932	0	0	not applicable	no elections	opposition
1933	1	0	Henk Sneevliet	Henk Sneevliet	opposition
1935	1	0	Henk Sneevliet	no elections	opposition
1936	1 *	0	Henk Sneevliet	no elections	opposition
1937	0 *	0	not applicable	no elections	opposition
1938	0 *	0	not applicable	no elections	opposition
1939	0 *	0	not applicable	no elections	opposition

* as RSAP

=== Municipal and provincial government ===
The party was particularly strong in the city of Amsterdam. Here Sneevliet was a member of the local legislative.

== Electorate ==
The RSP was mainly supported by leftwing intellectuals, who were highly concentrated in the large cities. Out of the 48.405 votes it got in 1933, 20.000 were obtained in Amsterdam.

== Organization ==
=== Youth wing ===
The Leninist Young Guard (Dutch: Leninistische Jeugd Garde; LJG) was an independent youth organization linked to the RSAP. LJG published Arbeidersjeugd 1937–1940. Sal Santen became the secretary of LJG in 1936.

=== Journal ===
The party-magazine of the RSP was called The Revolutionary (Dutch: De Baanbreker), it continued as the New Torch, after the foundation of the RSAP.

=== International organizations ===
The RSP was in close contact with Leon Trotsky and his followers in the International Left Opposition (which became the International Communist League) and signed the Declaration of the Four with the ICL in 1933. The OSP, however, was part of the International Revolutionary Marxist Centre, along with the British Independent Labour Party. When the two merged into the RSAP, the alignment with the IRMC continued.

=== Pillarized organization ===
Although the RSP was too small to have a real pillar of social organizations around it, it did have strong links with the anarcho-syndicalist trade union National Labour Secretariat, which previously had strong links with the communist party.

=== Relationships to other parties ===
The RSP was shunned by other leftwing parties, because of its strong opposition to the social-democratic SDAP and the communist CPH. Cooperation with the leftwing opposition of the SDAP, united the OSP resulted in the foundation of the RSAP in 1935.

== International comparison ==
The RSP and the RSAP are very comparable to other dissident Marxist groups within the anti-Stalinist left, including the left-communist movement, the Trotskyist movement (e.g. the French Workers' Struggle or American Workers Party, or parties formed as Marxist opposition within social-democratic parties, like Independent Social Democratic Party of Germany. Trotsky criticised the RSP/RSAP as "centrist".
