= International Revolutionary Marxist Centre =

International political association

- Abbreviation: IMRC
- Chairperson: Fenner Brockway
- Secretary: Julián Gorkin
- Founded: 1932
- Dissolved: 1940
- Split from: Labour and Socialist International
- Preceded by: International Working Union of Socialist Parties
- Headquarters: London
- Ideology: Centrist Marxism
- Political position: Left-wing to far-left

The International Revolutionary Marxist Centre was an international association of left-socialist parties. The member-parties rejected both mainstream social democracy and the Third International.

== Organizational history ==
The International was formed in 1932, following a fringe meeting at the Socialist International conference in Vienna in 1931. The IRMC underwent a variety of names. It was initially called the Committee of Independent Revolutionary Socialist Parties and later the International Bureau of Revolutionary Socialist Unity, but throughout the period it was generally known simply as the London Bureau (and nicknamed by some the 3½ International, in an analogy with the so-called 2½ International of 1921–3), although its headquarters were transferred from London to Paris in 1939 (on the grounds that in addition to the French affiliate, five parties-in-exile had their central committees there). Its youth wing was the International Bureau of Revolutionary Youth Organizations.

For a period, the IRMC was close to the Trotskyist movement and the International Left Opposition. In the early 1930s, Leon Trotsky and his supporters believed that Stalin's influence over the Third International could still be fought from within and slowly rolled back. They organised themselves into the International Left Opposition in 1930, which was intended to be a group of anti-Stalinist dissenters within the Third International. Stalin's supporters, who dominated the International, would no longer tolerate dissent. All Trotskyists, and those suspected of being influenced by Trotskyism, were expelled.

Trotsky claimed that the Third Period policies of the Comintern had contributed to the rise of Adolf Hitler in Germany, and that its turn to a popular front policy (aiming to unite all ostensibly anti-fascist forces) sowed illusions in reformism and pacifism and "clear[ed] the road for a fascist overturn". By 1935 he claimed that the Comintern had fallen irredeemably into the hands of the Stalinist bureaucracy. He and his supporters, expelled from the Third International, participated in a conference of the London Bureau. Three of those parties joined the Left Opposition in signing a document written by Trotsky calling for a Fourth International, which became known as the "Declaration of Four". Of those, two soon distanced themselves from the agreement, but the Dutch Revolutionary Socialist Party worked with the International Left Opposition to declare the International Communist League.

The Spanish section merged with the Spanish section of ICO, forming the Workers' Party of Marxist Unification (POUM). Trotsky claimed the merger was to be a capitulation to centrism. The Socialist Workers' Party of Germany, a left split from the Social Democratic Party of Germany founded in 1931, co-operated with the International Left Opposition briefly in 1933 but soon abandoned the call for a new International.

The secretariat of the International Centre remained with the British Independent Labour Party (ILP) for all but one of the eight years 1932–1940. Fenner Brockway, ILP leader, was chairman of the Bureau for most of this period, while in 1939, Julián Gorkin of the POUM became its secretary. By this time, the Bureau had member parties in more than 20 countries, including the Netherlands, Austria, Czechoslovakia, the United States, and Palestine.

== Member parties ==
- Austria - Red Front (1935, joined the Revolutionary Socialists of Austria)
- Bulgaria - United Socialist Party (from 1932 until 1936, contact was lost)
- France - Groups of the Workers' Unity Friends (from 1935 until 1936)
- France - Party of Proletarian Unity (PUP) (from 1933)
- France - Workers and Peasants Socialist Party (PSOP) (from 1935 as Revolutionary Left a faction of the SFIO)
- Germany - Socialist Workers' Party of Germany (SAPD) (from 1932 until 1938)
- Germany - Communist opposition (KP(O) (from 1939, observer only, unaffiliated)
- Germany - Lenin League (from 1933 until 1935)
- Germany - Marxists-Internationalists (from 1939)
- Germany - Neuer Weg (opposition faction within SAPD) (from 1938)
- Germany - Spark (1938)
- Greece - Communist Archio-Marxist Party of Greece (ΚΑΚΕ) (from 1938)
- Italy - Maximalist Italian Socialist Party (PSIm) (from 1933)
- Netherlands - Independent Socialist Party (OSP) (from 1932 until 1935, founder of RSAP)
- Netherlands - League of Revolutionary Socialists (BRS) (from 1936 until 1938)
- Netherlands - Revolutionary Socialist Party (Netherlands) (RSP) (from 1933 until 1935, founder of RSAP)
- Netherlands - Revolutionary Socialist Workers Party (RSAP) (1935)
- Norway - Norwegian Labour Party (DNA) (from 1932 until 1935)
- Norway - Towards Daybreak (Mot Dag) (from 1933 until 1936)
- Palestine - Left Workers of Zion (Poalei Zion Smol) (from 1937)
- Palestine - Young Guard (Hashomer Hatzair) (from 1936)
- Poland - General Jewish Labor Bund in Poland (Bund) (from 1932)
- Poland - Independent Socialist Labour Party (NSPP) (from 1932 until 1936)
- Romania - Independent Socialist Party (PSI) (from 1933 until 1933, founder of PSU)
- Romania - Unified Socialist Party (PSU) (from 1933 until 1936)
- Spain - Workers' Party of Marxist Unification (POUM) (from 1933))
- Sweden - Socialist Party (SSP) (from 1933 until 1938)
- United Kingdom - Independent Labour Party (ILP) (from 1932)
- United Kingdom - Revolutionary Socialist Party (RSP) (from 1936 until 1938)
- United States - Independent Labor League of America (ILLA) (from 1939)
- United States - League for a Revolutionary Workers Party
- USSR - Left Social Revolutionaries (from 1933 until 1938)
- International Communist Opposition

== See also ==
- Comintern
- Fourth International
- Anti-Stalinist left

== Literature ==
- Buschak, Willy. Das Londoner Büro. Europäische Linkssozialisten in der Zwischenkriegszeit. Stichting Internationaal Instituut voor Sociale Geschiedenis, Amsterdam, 1985
- Dreyfus, Michel (1980). "Bureau de Paris et bureau de Londres: le socialisme de gauche en Europe entre les deux guerres". Le Mouvement Social. No. 112 (Jul. - Sep., 1980), pp. 25–55
