= International Bureau of Revolutionary Youth Organizations =

International Bureau of Revolutionary Youth Organizations (in German: Internationales Büro Revolutionärer Jugendorganisationen, in French: Bureau International des Organisations Révolutionnaires des Jeunes) was an international organization of socialist youth, formed in 1934. It functioned as the youth wing of the London Bureau.

The founding congress was held in the Netherlands, hosted by the Independent Socialist Party (OSP). However the congress was broken up by the Dutch police. Foreign delegates were deported, amongst them German delegates who were deported back to Germany. The congress was then re-convened in Lille. The congress elected a Bureau (with one representative of each participating organization) and a Secretariat. The Secretariat had three members, one from the SAPD (Willy Brandt), one from the International Left Opposition (Heinz Epe) and one from the Socialist Party of Sweden.

The IBRYO secretariat was headquartered in Stockholm. The Bureau secretariat met in Malmö and Stockholm. Epe was headquartered in Oslo, Norway.

IBRYO published Internationales Jugend-Bulletin.

In 1935 the Trotskyists were expelled from the Bureau, as they had collectively embarked on entryism into the major labour parties (which was contrary to the ambitions of IBRYO and the London Bureau to build a new international).

== List of parties and organisations whose youth wings were part of the Bureau (incomplete list) ==
- Socialist Party (Sweden)
- Socialist Workers' Party of Germany
- Communist League of Struggle (United States) (left in 1935)
- Independent Socialist Party (Netherlands)
- International Left Opposition (expelled in 1935)
- Workers' Party of Marxist Unification (Spain)
