= Left Opposition =

1923–1927 Soviet political faction

Left Opposition Левая оппозиция
- Leader: Leon Trotsky
- Founded: October 1923
- Dissolved: December 1927
- Merged into: United Opposition
- Ideology: Marxism; Trotskyism; Anti-Stalinism (after 1925); Permanent revolution Proletarian internationalism
- Political position: Far-left
- National affiliation: Russian Communist Party (Bolsheviks)
- International affiliation: International Left Opposition

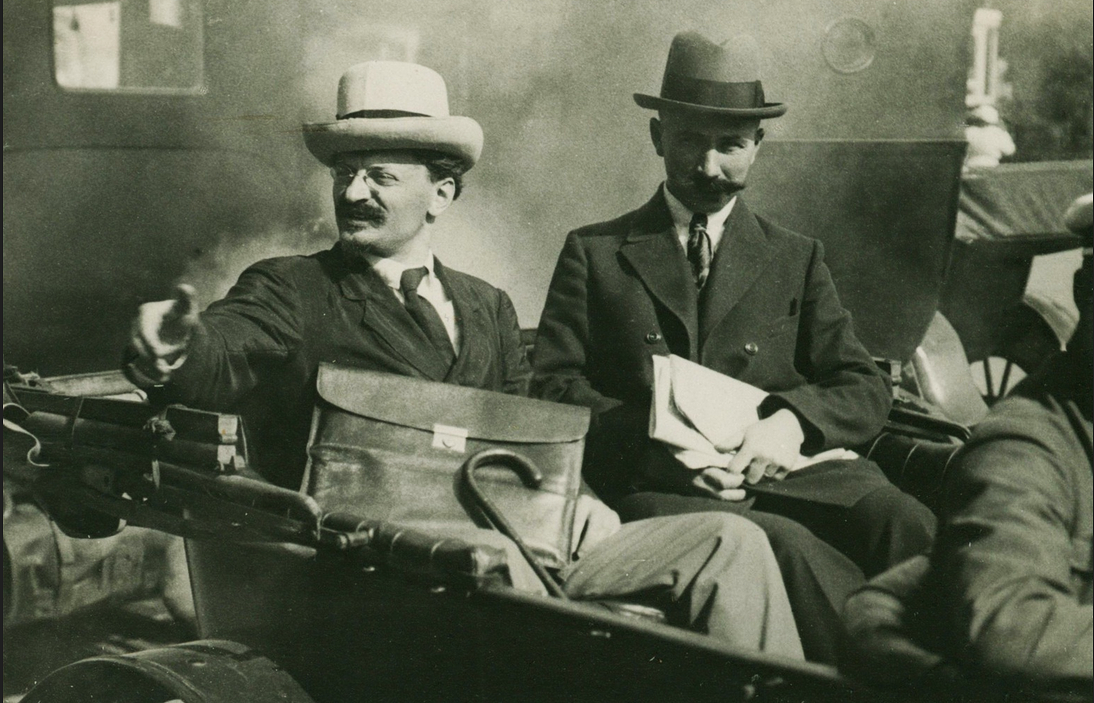
Trotsky and his personal secretary, Yevgeni Preobrazhensky in 1918

The Left Opposition (Russian: Левая оппозиция, romanized: Levaya oppozitsiya) was a faction within the Russian Communist Party (Bolsheviks) from 1923 to 1927 headed by Leon Trotsky, who formed it to mount a struggle against the perceived bureaucratic degeneration within the party leadership headed by Joseph Stalin. The Left Opposition advocated for a programme of rapid industrialization, voluntary collectivisation of agriculture, and the expansion of a worker's democracy in a wider framework with the New Economic Policy.

Intellectuals who had previously lived in exile during the Tsarist era would constitute the core of the Left Opposition during the succession period. Members represented the most internationalist elements of the party and held offices at the highest responsibility with Christian Rakovsky, Adolph Joffe, and Nikolay Krestinsky holding ambassadorial posts in London, Paris, Tokyo, and Berlin.

Originally, the battle lines were drawn between Trotsky and his supporters who signed The Declaration of 46 in October 1923 on the one hand and a triumvirate (also known by its Russian name Troika) of Communist International (Comintern) chairman Grigory Zinoviev, Communist Party General Secretary Joseph Stalin and Politburo chairman Lev Kamenev on the other hand. The Left Opposition argued that the New Economic Policy had weakened the Soviet Union by allowing the private sector to achieve an increasingly important position in the Soviet economy while in their opinion, the centrally planned, socialised sector of the economy languished (including the mostly state-run heavy industries which were seen as essential not only for continued industrialisation but also defence). The platform called for the state to adopt a programme for mass industrialisation and to encourage the mechanization and collectivisation of agriculture, thereby developing the means of production and helping the Soviet Union move towards parity with Western capitalist countries, which would also increase the proportion of the economy which was part of the socialised sector of the economy and definitively shift the Soviet Union towards a socialist mode of production.

There was also the Right Opposition, which was led by the leading party theoretician and Pravda editor Nikolai Bukharin and supported by Sovnarkom Chairman (prime minister) Alexei Rykov and Chairman of the All-Union Central Council of Trade Unions Mikhail Tomsky. In late 1924, as Stalin proposed his new socialism in one country theory, Stalin drew closer to the Right Opposition and his triumvirate with Grigory Zinoviev and Lev Kamenev slowly broke up over the next year (Zinoviev and Kamenev were both executed in 1936). The Right Opposition were allied to Stalin's Centre from late 1924 until their alliance broke up in the years from 1928 to 1930 over strategy towards the kulaks and NEPmen. Trotsky and his supporters in the Left Opposition were joined by the Group of Democratic Centralism to form the United (or Joint) Opposition.

== Emergence and dissolution ==
The first confrontation between the Left Opposition and the triumvirate occurred from October 1923 to January 1924 over industrialization policies. The triumvirate won decisively at the XIII Party Conference in January 1924. Following Lenin's death in January 1924, the confrontation between the Left Opposition and the triumvirate expanded more openly into a dispute over Trotsky's policies, with the triumvirate accusing Trotsky's policies of being "anti-Leninist". At the XIIIth Communist Party Congress in May 1924, the triumvirate's position was further strengthened at the Left Opposition's expense. Another confrontation took place from October to December 1924, during the so-called "Literary Discussion" and criticism of Trotsky's permanent revolution policy as Stalin proposed socialism in one country. This resulted in the removal of Trotsky from his ministerial post on 6 January 1925, although Stalin opposed Zinoviev's demand that Trotsky be expelled from the Party.

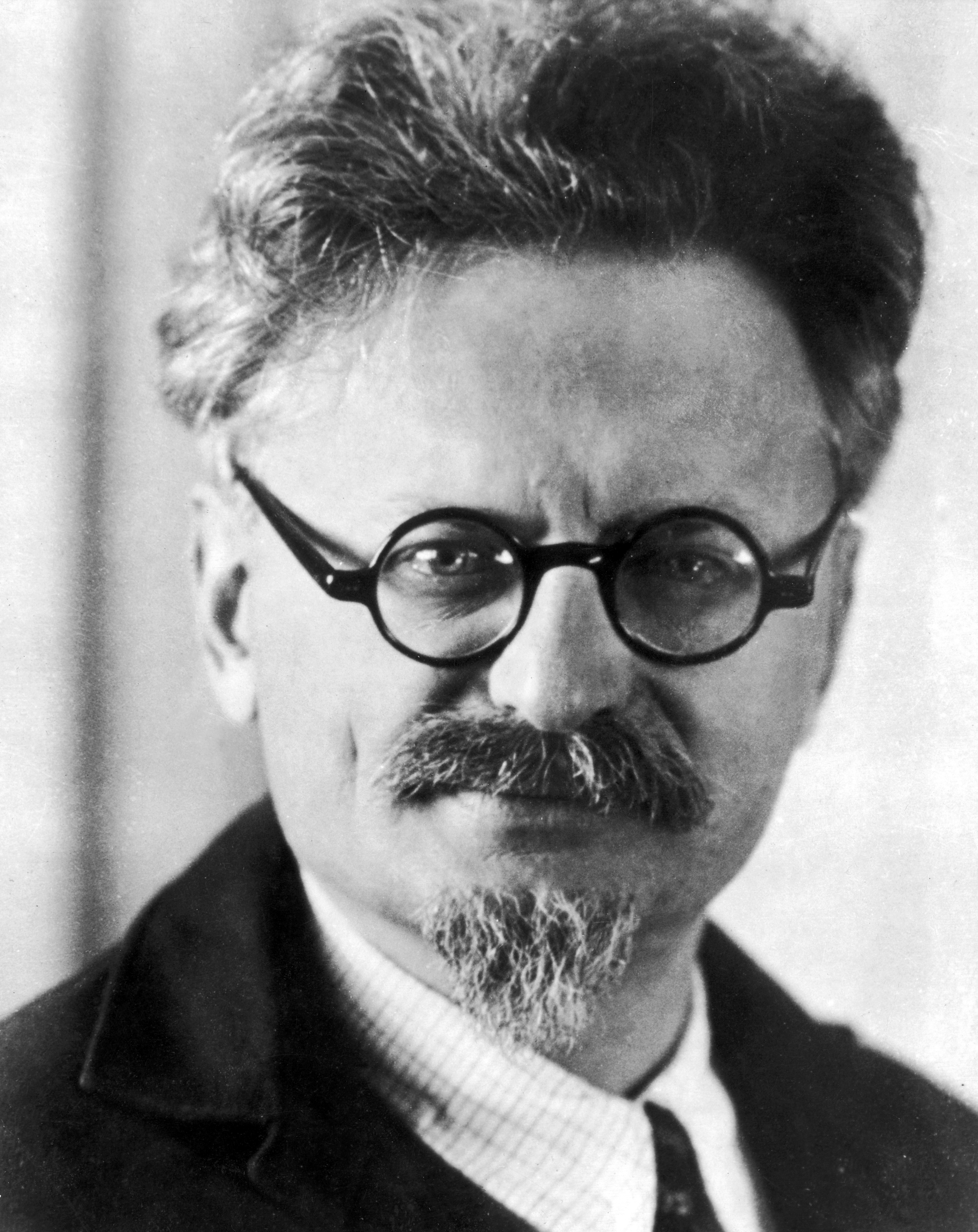
Leon Trotsky, the de facto Left Opposition leader, pictured in the 1930s

With Trotsky largely marginalized, Zinoviev and Kamenev had a falling out with Stalin at the XIVth Communist Party Conference in April 1925 over Stalin's October 1924 proposal of socialism in one country, which Zinoviev and Kamenev now openly opposed. By this time, the Right Opposition leader, Bukharin, had elaborated on Stalin's socialism in one country policy, giving it a theoretical justification. This solidified the Right Opposition as Stalin's main allies, as the triumvirate of Stalin-Zinoviev-Kamenev from recent years broke up. Soon after the April 1925 Conference, Zinoviev and Kamenev formed the New Opposition, but they were defeated by Stalin, who was again supported by Bukharin and Rykov, at the XIVth Party Congress in December 1925. Soon after their defeat at the Congress, Zinoviev and Kamenev joined forces with Trotsky's Left Opposition in early 1926, in what became known as the United Opposition. From July to October 1926, the United Opposition lost out to Stalin, and its leaders were expelled from the ruling Politburo.

In October 1927, soon after catastrophic events regarding the Northern Expedition, which confirmed the United Opposition's critical analysis of the Chinese Communist Party's support for the nationalist Kuomintang, the last United Opposition members were expelled from the Communist Party Central Committee; and in November 1927, Trotsky and Zinoviev were expelled from the Communist Party itself, after holding a street demonstration on the tenth anniversary of the October Revolution. In December 1927, the XVth Party Congress declared Left Opposition and Trotskyist views to be incompatible with Communist Party membership and expelled all leading Left Opposition supporters from the Party.

After their expulsion by the XVth Congress, Zinoviev, Kamenev, and their supporters immediately surrendered to Stalin, "admitted their mistakes" and were readmitted to the Communist Party in 1928, although they never regained their former influence and eventually perished in the Great Purge. Trotsky and his supporters, on the other hand, refused to capitulate to Stalin and were exiled to remote areas of the Soviet Union in early 1928. Trotsky was eventually expelled from the country in February 1929, sent into exile in Turkey. Trotsky's supporters remained in exile, but their resolve began to waver in 1929 as Stalin turned against Bukharin and Rykov and adopted the policy of collectivization, which appeared to be close to the policies that the Left Opposition had advocated earlier. The Left Opposition attempted to field opposition candidates against the official Communist Party candidates in the 1929 elections, but to no avail. Most (but not all) prominent Left Opposition members recanted between 1929 and 1934, but they nearly all perished during the Great Purge of the mid-late 1930s along with the Oppositionists who remained unrepentant.

Some of its members, while claiming to have given up on their old views, participated in the underground opposition in the USSR. They, like I. N. Smirnov, even maintained contact with Trotsky and his son Sedov. During this period, the Trotskyists formed an opposition bloc with several other groups, for example the members of the former Right Opposition. Historian Pierre Broué stated that the opposition groups were dissolved in early 1933, when many of its members were arrested. However, some documents found in 2018 showed that the Underground Left Opposition stayed active even in prison; in fact, the prisons became their centers of activity.

In the meantime, Trotsky founded the International Left Opposition in 1930. It was meant to be an opposition group within the Comintern, but members of the Comintern were immediately expelled as soon as they joined (or were suspected of joining) the ILO. The ILO therefore concluded that opposing Stalinism from within the Communist organizations controlled by Stalin's supporters had become impossible, so new organizations had to be formed. In 1933, the ILO was renamed the International Communist League (ICL), which formed the basis of the Fourth International, founded in Paris in 1938.

Several members of the Left Opposition also engaged in literary-intellectual activities following their forced exile from Moscow during the interwar period. Radek wrote a biographical account of Lenin, Rakovsky produced a work on the left-wing socialist Saint-Simon, Preobrazhensky completed books on the Soviet economy and the economy of medieval Europe, Smilga chronicled the Bukharian school of thought, and Dingelstedt produced essays on the social structure of India.

== Historical evaluation ==
"We say that there can now be no doubt whatever that, as the evolution of the directing line of the faction (i.e., the majority of the Central Committee) has shown, the main core of the 1923 opposition correctly warned against the danger of a shift from the proletarian line, and against the ominous growth of the apparatus regime."

— Party speech of Grigory Zinoviev in 1926.

According to historian Sheila Fitzpatrick, the scholarly consensus was that Stalin appropriated the position of the Left Opposition on such matters as industrialisation and collectivisation.

Trotsky maintained that the disproportions and imbalances which became characteristic of Stalinist planning in the 1930s such as the underdeveloped consumer base along with the priority focus on heavy industry were due to a number of avoidable problems. He argued that the industrial drive had been enacted under more severe circumstances, several years later and in a less rational manner than originally conceived by the Left Opposition. Comparatively, Trotsky believed that planning and N.E.P should develop within a mixed framework until the socialist sector gradually superseded the private industry.

American historian Robert Vincent Daniels viewed the Left Opposition as a critical alternative to the Stalin-Bukharin majority in a number of areas. Daniels stated that the Left Opposition would have prioritised industrialisation but never contemplated the "violent uprooting" employed by Stalin and contrasted most directly with Stalinism on the issue of party democratization and bureaucratization. Concurrently, Daniels believed that the practical differences in their international policy with other factions had been exaggerated and he contended that Trotsky was no more prepared than other Bolshevik figures to risk war or the loss of trade opportunities despite his support for world revolution.

Russian historian, Vadim Rogovin, argued that the Left Opposition, led by Trotsky, was a political movement that "offered a real alternative to Stalinism, and that to crush this movement was the primary function of the Stalinist terror". Rogovin also stated that contemporary historians believed that 40,000 to 50,000 people (more than 10% of the party membership) had voted for the platform of the Opposition during the 1923 discussion. He noted that the majority of the party organisation, especially in Moscow, had voted for the Opposition in 1923. At the same time, Stalin approved the appointment of Amayak Nazaretian, the head of his personal secretariat, who would later falsify voting results of party meetings which were then reported to Pravda magazine.

However, political scientist Susan Weissman criticized the lack of consistency from members of the Left Opposition over the issue of democratization. She argued that Trotsky and Preobrazhensky overly focused on intra-party democracy rather than widespread democratization outside of the party during the 1920s. Trotsky would develop his writings of political pluralism in the 1930s. Although, Weissman acknowledged the heterogenous views of the Left Opposition and described one of their members, Victor Serge, as a consistent defender of a multi-party system and favoured a coalition government to bureaucratic rule. Other figures such as Isaac Deutscher and Ernest Mandel maintain that the intra-party reforms proposed by the Left Opposition from 1923-1926 would have revitalised party democratization, mass participation, worker's self-management and eventually a multi-party socialist democracy.

The Left Opposition received active support primarily from intellectuals and the youth section of the Moscow party base. Party histories and documents such as the "Great Soviet Encyclopedia" recorded varying levels of support for the Left Opposition across the membership base. At a meeting of workers' cells, 9,843 voters were cast for the Central Committee (CC) which was controlled by Zinioviev, Kamenev, and Stalin at the time whereas 2,223 voted for the Opposition. Conversely, at meetings of student cells, the CC received only 2,790 voted whereas the Opposition received 6,594. Among the military and administrative delegates elected to regional conferences in Moscow, 1,708 voted for the CC, while 878 voted for the Opposition.

Internationally, Trotsky's opposition and criticism of the ruling troika received support from several Central Committee members of foreign communist parties. This included Christian Rakovsky, Chairman of the Ukraine Sovnarkom, Boris Souvarine of the French Communist Party, and the Central Committee of the Polish Communist Party that was led by prominent theoreticians such as Maksymilian Horwitz, Maria Koszutska, and Adolf Warski.

== Leading members of the Left Opposition ==
- Leon Trotsky (Lev Davidovich Bronstein) (1879–1940), People's Commissar for Foreign Affairs, founder and commander of the Red Army and People's Commissar of War during the Russian Civil War, and de facto leader of the Left Opposition. Expelled from the USSR in 1929, he went on to found the Fourth International. Assassinated by a Soviet agent in 1940.
- Alexander Beloborodov (1891–1938)
- Mikhail Boguslavsky (1886–1937)
- Andrei Bubnov (1884–1938), signed the Declaration of the 46 in October 1923, but defected to Stalin soon thereafter. Later head of the Communist Party organization within the Red Army and then People Commissar (minister) of Education. Expelled from the Party Central Committee in November 1937, arrested and perished in the Great Purge.
- Chen Duxiu (1879–1942): founder of the Chinese Communist Party, from which he was expelled in 1927, and went on to found the Chinese Left Opposition
- Yakov Drobnis (1890–1937)
- Adolph Joffe (1883–1927)
- Iosif Kosior (1893–1937)
- Nikolai Krestinsky (1883–1938)
- Sergei Mrachkovsky (1883–1936)
- Nikolai Muralov (1877–1937), Deputy People's Commissar of Agriculture and Moscow district commander of the Red Army
- Valerian Obolensky (also known as N. Osinsky) (1887–1938), one of the leaders of the Group of Democratic Centralism
- Georgy Oppokov (also known as A. Lomov) (1888–1937)
- Yevgeni Preobrazhensky (1886–1937), economic theoretician of the Left Opposition, author of The New Economics
- Georgy Pyatakov (1890–1937)
- Karl Radek (1885–1939)
- Christian Rakovsky (1873–1941)
- Timofei Sapronov (1887–1937), one of the leaders of the Group of Democratic Centralism.
- Leonid Serebryakov (1890–1937)
- Victor Serge (1890–1947), went into exile.
- Ivar Smilga (Ivar Tenisovich Smilga) (1892–1937), chairman of the Regional Committee of the Soviets in Finland in 1917, chairman of Tsentrobalt, Central Committee of the Baltic Fleet, 1917–1918)
- Ivan Nikitich Smirnov (1881–1936)
- Vladimir Smirnov (1887–1937), one of the leaders of the Group of Democratic Centralism
- Lev Sosnovsky (1886–1937), former head of Agitprop and journalist.
- Varvara Yakovleva (1884–1941), she signed The Declaration of 46 and was the most prominent female member of the Left Opposition. Her jobs had included being Vice Commissar in the RSFSR People's Commissariat for Education, the deputy head of the Petrograd Cheka, and a former board member of the People's Commissariat of Food. She left the Opposition in October 1927 under growing pressure from the Joseph Stalin led government.

== See also ==
- Anti-Stalinist left
- Dewey Commission
- Economic planning
- International Bureau of Revolutionary Youth Organizations
- Planned economy
- Primitive socialist accumulation
- Scissors Crisis
- Socialist democracy
