= Independent Socialist Party (Netherlands) =

Independent Socialist Party Onafhankelijke Socialistische Partij
- Founded: 28 March 1932
- Dissolved: 1935
- Split from: Social Democratic Workers' Party
- Merged into: Revolutionary Socialist Workers' Party
- Ideology: Marxism; Revolutionary socialism Eurofederalism
- Political position: Left-wing
- Colors: Red

"Against War, Fascism - Vote OSP". 1933 OSP election poster

The Independent Socialist Party (Dutch: Onafhankelijke Socialistische Partij; OSP) was a revolutionary socialist political party in the Netherlands.

== History ==
The party was founded by a group around Jacques de Kadt and Piet J. Schmidt on 28 March 1932. The group had split from the SDAP after a conflict over the internal opposition publication, the De Fakkel. The moderate leadership of the SDAP banned the publication, in reaction to this the leftwing opposition left the party. It entered in the 1933 elections where at won 27,000 votes and nearly one seat. In 1935 the party merged with the Revolutionary Socialist Party, and formed the Revolutionary Socialist Workers Party.

== Ideology and issues ==
The OSP was an orthodox Marxist, revolutionary socialist party, which opposed both the authoritarian Stalinism of the Communist Party of the Netherlands and the moderate reformism of the Social-Democratic Workers' Party. The party's main goal was the proletarian world revolution, which would replace the capitalist system by a system of workers' councils. In the end this would result in a Communist society where inequality, exploitation and class would be eliminated.

== Electorate ==
The RSP was mainly supported by leftwing intellectuals and educated workers, who were highly concentrated in the large cities.

== Organization ==
=== Linked organisations ===
The party had a strong basis of young militants, united in Socialist Youth Union. (Dutch: Socialistische Jeugd Vereniging; SJV). The party magazine was the De Fakkel (The Torch), which had actually ignited the break between OSP and SDAP. The Youth Union was affiliated to the International Bureau of Revolutionary Youth Organizations.

=== Relationships to other parties ===
The OSP was shunned by other leftwing parties, because of its strong opposition to the social-democratic SDAP and the Communist CPH. Cooperation with the small Left-Communist RSP led to their merger with the RSAP in 1935.

== International comparison ==
The OSP is very comparable to other parties formed as orthodox Marxist opposition within social-democratic parties, like Independent Social Democratic Party of Germany (see anti-Stalinist left and centrist Marxism).

== Bibliography ==
- De Cort, B. (2004) Solidariteit in anonimiteit. De geschiedenis van de leden van de Onafhankelijke Socialistische Partij
- Eekman, M. and H. Pieterson (1987) Linkssocialisme tussen de Wereldoorlogen
- Vossen, K. (2003) Vrij vissen in het Vondelpark. Kleine politieke partijen in Nederland 1918-1940 pp. 82–94
