= Jacques de Kadt =

Dutch politician

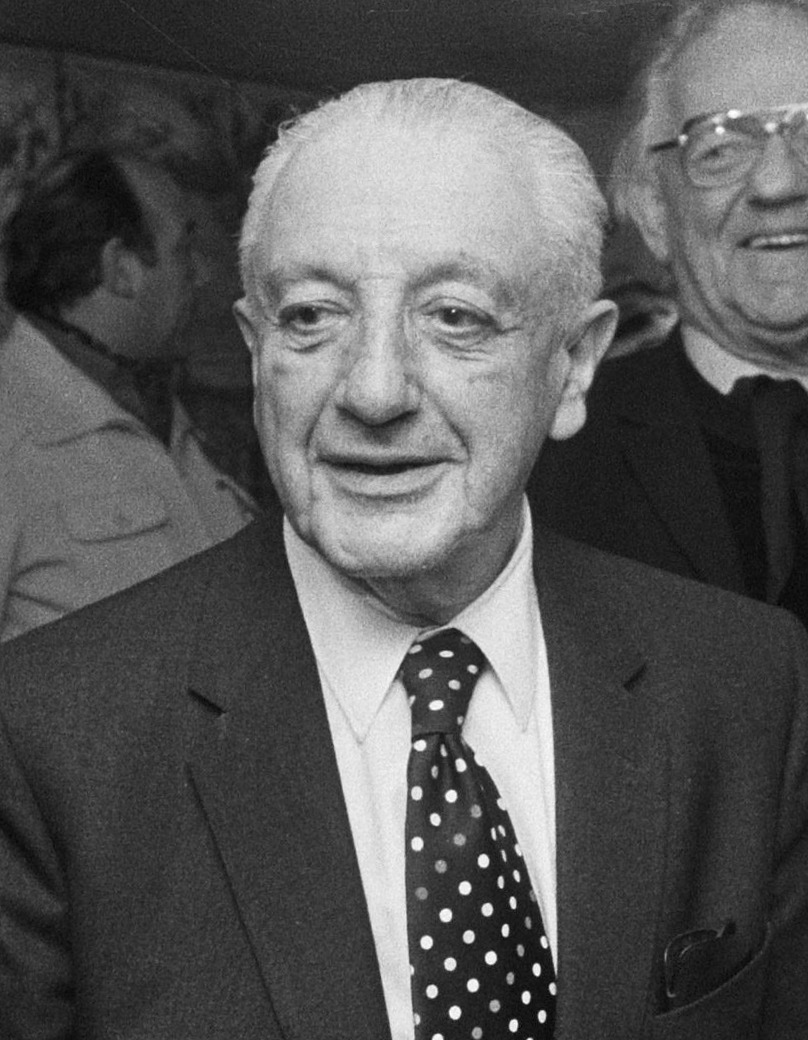
- Jacques de Kadt in 1980

Member of the House of Representatives
- In office 27 July 1948 – 5 June 1963

Personal details
- Born: 30 July 1897 Oss
- Died: 16 April 1988 (aged 90) Santpoort
- Party: CPH (1919-1924); BKSP (1924-1927); SDAP (1928-1932); OSP (1932-1934); PvdA (1946-1970)
- Spouse: Esther Stern (m. 1948)

Jacques de Kadt (30 July 1897 – 16 April 1988) was a prominent and often controversial 20th Century Dutch political thinker, politician and man of letters who was born in Oss and died in Santpoort. Born into a liberal Jewish family, he was the youngest son of a factory manager, Roelof de Kadt, and his wife Bertha Koppens. Author of numerous books and articles, his reputation was established by his book Het fascisme en de nieuwe vrijheid (Fascism and the New Freedom) which was published in 1939, shortly before the outbreak of the Second World War.

== Early career ==
De Kadt's early political career was shaped, in part, by the influence of Rosa Luxemburg. He joined the Dutch Communist Party, soon only to become disenchanted with it and, especially, with the political developments in the Soviet Union. In consequence, he left the Communist Party of Holland in 1924, and formed the League of Communist Struggle & Propaganda Clubs (BKSP) along with Henriette Roland Holst and several others.

He subsequently chronicled his embrace of, and break with, Communism in the first volume of his autobiography, Uit mijn communistentijd, published in Amsterdam in 1965 by his loyal publisher, G.A. van Oorschot. De Kadt developed into a trenchant and increasingly uncompromising critic of Stalinism, and articulated an independent line of socialist thought and political practice. This was expressed both in the content of his first major book, From Tsarism to Stalinism published in 1935 in Antwerp, and in his pivotal role in the formation of the Independent Socialist Party (OSP), from which he had been expelled in 1934 due to disagreements with party leadership over the Jordaanoproer. The book, which identified a continuity between the character of the Tsarist state and the Soviet political system under Stalin, contained an intimation of De Kadt's broader critique of twentieth century totalitarianism – a critique which was to define the nature of his subsequent political career.

== Fascism ==
The 1930s marked a significant period in the maturation of De Kadt's thought. He published widely on the major political developments of the time as well as on cultural, literary and philosophical topics. His writings addressed not only the threat posed by Fascism and Stalinism but included a major study of Georges Sorel, and numerous articles on notable (and not so well known) political and literary figures. De Kadt was a prodigiously productive – if often acerbic and polemical – writer who, at his best, was a writer of great elegance and style. Bart Tromp, an editor of a posthumously published collection of essays, referred to him as "an Orwell of Oss". In Het fascisme en de nieuwe vrijheid, De Kadt predicts the coming of the Second World War, the ultimate defeat of Fascism and the emergence of the United States of America and the Soviet Union as the dominant global powers. The book also contains a normative defence of "western civilization" and its scientific underpinning. The book served as one source of inspiration for H. Floris Cohen's 1994 historiographical exploration of the 'scientific revolution'.

== Parliamentary career ==
De Kadt was a Labour Party member of the Dutch parliament from 1948 to 1963. He served for many years as the party's principal spokesman on foreign affairs, though his outspoken stance on Indonesian independence (of which he was a vigorous early proponent) and his sharp, unqualified, opposition to Stalinism and the Soviet system ruled him out as a contender for the ministerial position that was held by Joseph Luns. He was a strong supporter of NATO in order to protect to protect against the USSR, and during the Korean War he proposed imprisoning 5000-10,000 communists in labour camps. De Kadt was a regular radio commentator for the VARA during these years. His contribution to Dutch public life and service was recognized in 1959 when he was awarded a knighthood in the Order of the Netherlands Lion.

== Later life ==
Despite his growing concerns over what he saw as pacifist tendencies within the PvdA, he left the House of Representatives due to advanced age on relatively good terms. As the New Left gradually grew in influence within the PvdA, he grew alienated from the party, seeing them as "the fifth column of Moscow". In 1970, he left the PvdA, and would sympathise with DS'70, a moderate splinter group. De Kadt became increasingly conservative and cynical, and in a book from 1972 he would condemn the social changes that were engulfing the Netherlands during that decade, but he had become a marginal figure. In 1979, he quit writing due to health issues. Jacques de Kadt died on 16 April 1988 in Santpoort

== Bibliographical references ==
- Havenaar, R. (1990) De tocht naar het onbekende – Het politieke denken van Jacques de Kadt
- Pels, D. (1993) Het democratisch verschil. Jacques de Kadt en de nieuwe elite
- Cohen, H. Floris (1994) The Scientific Revolution: A Historiographical Inquiry, Chicago, Chicago University Press
