= League of Communist Struggle & Propaganda Clubs =

The League of Communist Struggle & Propaganda Clubs (Dutch: Bond van Kommunistische Strijd- en Propagandaclubs, or BKSP) was a communist organization in the Netherlands. BKSP was formed by people like Henriëtte Roland Holst, Jacq Engels and Jacques de Kadt in May 1924, after a split from the Communist Party of Holland (CPH). The founders of BKSP were dissatisfied with the leadership of David Wijnkoop over CPH, and left it after their proposals had been defeated at the 1924 April congress of the party. De Kadt was the secretary of the organization throughout its existence.

BKSP published De Kommunist. The first issue appeared on July 4, 1924.

As David Wijnkoop was removed from the CPH leadership in 1925, a large sector of BKSP opted to rejoin CPH. De Kadt opposed this, and continued to run BKSP as a separate organization.

BKSP was dissolved in 1927. The last copy of De Kommunist was published on March 26, 1927. After the dissolution of BKSP, de Kadt joined the SDAP.
