= International Working Union of Socialist Parties =

International political organization (1921–23)

International Working Union of Socialist Parties Internationale Arbeitsgemeinschaft Sozialistischer Parteien
- Abbreviation: IWUSP; IASP
- Secretary: Fritz Adler
- Founded: February 27, 1921; 105 years ago
- Dissolved: May 21, 1923; 102 years ago
- Preceded by: Second International
- Succeeded by: Labour and Socialist International
- Ideology: Centrist Marxism; Democratic socialism Anti-Bolshevism
- Political position: Left-wing
- Colors: Red

The International Working Union of Socialist Parties (IWUSP; also known as the 2½ International or the Vienna International; German: Internationale Arbeitsgemeinschaft Sozialistischer Parteien, IASP) was a political international for the co-operation of socialist parties.

== History ==
The IWUSP was founded on 27 February 1921 at a conference in Vienna, Austria, by ten parties, including the Independent Social Democratic Party of Germany (USPD), the French Section of the Workers' International (SFIO), the Independent Labour Party (ILP), the Social Democratic Party of Switzerland (SPS), the Social Democratic Party of Austria (SPÖ), and the Federation of Romanian Socialist Parties (FPSR, created by splinter groups of the Socialist Party of Romania). In April 1921, it was joined by the Spanish Socialist Workers' Party. The Maximalist faction of the Italian Socialist Party (PSI) also joined.

== Members ==
The secretary of the IWUSP was the Austrian Friedrich Adler of the SPÖ; other prominent members were Otto Bauer and Julius Martov. The group was heavily influenced by Austromarxism. It published Nachrichten der Internationalen Arbeitsgemeinschaft Sozialistischer Parteien ("News of the IWUSP"). Poale Zion (labour Zionist) leaders David Ben-Gurion and Shlomo Kaplansky were active in the movement behind the Two and a Half International.

== Ideology ==
The founders of the IWUSP were parties that saw neither the reformist Second International nor the Communist and pro-Soviet Third International as alternatives for affiliation. The IWUSP criticized the other two Internationals for what it perceived to be dogmatism, and advocated that more consideration should be given to the particularities of the political situation in each country. It worked for the unification of the Second and Third Internationals. From 2 to 5 April 1922 the Conference of the Three Internationals was held in Berlin with delegations from the three different international bodies to discuss a merger, but unity was not achieved and the Comintern withdrew from the talks.

== Dissolution ==
In Germany on 24 September 1922, the USPD, one of the main components of the IWUSP, merged with the Social Democratic Party of Germany (SPD), a member of the Berne International. Discouraged by the intransigent position of the Third International, the Berne International and the IWUSP merged to form the Labour and Socialist International (LSI) at a joint congress in Hamburg in May 1923. Some, such as the FPSR, refused to join the new body.

In the 1930s, a similar effort was made to create an international between the reformism of the Second International and the Leninism of the Third International, as the London Bureau of left-wing socialist parties. Sometimes called the "Three-and-a-Half International", it involved many of the same parties.

== See also ==
- Democratic socialism
