= Henk Sneevliet =

20th-century Dutch communist politician

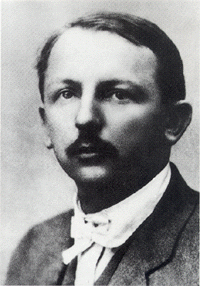

Member of the Dutch House of Representatives
- In office 1933–1937

Personal details
- Born: Hendricus Josephus Franciscus Marie Sneevliet; 13 May 1883 Rotterdam, Kingdom of the Netherlands
- Died: 13 April 1942 (aged 58) Amersfoort concentration camp, Reichskommissariat Niederlande
- Cause of death: Execution
- Party: Revolutionary Socialist (Workers') Party
- Other political affiliations: Communist Party of the Netherlands; Communist Party of Indonesia; Chinese Communist Party

Hendricus Josephus Franciscus Marie Sneevliet, known as Henk Sneevliet or by the pseudonym "Maring" (13 May 1883 – 13 April 1942), was a Dutch communist politician who was active in both the Netherlands and the Dutch East Indies. As a functionary of the Communist International, Sneevliet guided the formation of both the Communist Party of Indonesia in 1914, and the Chinese Communist Party in 1921. In his native country, he was the founder, chairman, and only Representative for the Revolutionary Socialist (Workers') Party (RSP/RSAP). He took part in the communist resistance against the occupation of the Netherlands during World War II by Nazi Germany, for which he was executed by the Germans in April 1942.

== Biography ==
=== Early life ===
Hendricus "Henk" Sneevliet was born on 13 May 1883 in Rotterdam, Netherlands, and grew up in Den Bosch in a poor Catholic family. He was the son of Anthonie Sneevliet, a cigar maker, and the former Henrica J. W. van Macklenbergh.

After finishing his education in 1900, Sneevliet moved to Zutphen and started working for the Dutch railways. He became a member of the Social Democratic Workers Party (SDAP) as well as the Dutch Association of Railway and Tramway Employees (NV) in 1902. From 1906, Sneevliet was active for the SDAP in Zwolle, where he became the first social democrat city council member in the elections of 1907.

Sneevliet was very active in the NV and was elected to the union's executive committee in 1906. In 1909 he was tapped as vice-chairman of the union and named as editor-in-chief of the union's official journal. He became chairman of the union in 1911.

Sneevliet, as a committed socialist and militant trade unionist, was strongly supportive of an international seamen's strike which was called in 1911 and was disgruntled by the failure of his union and political party to support the campaign. As a result, he resigned from both organizations, joining instead the more radical Social Democratic Party of the Netherlands (forerunner of the Dutch Communist Party) and writing for the Marxist magazine De Nieuwe Tijd (The New Time). Sneevliet's alienation strengthened him in his decision to leave the Netherlands for the Dutch East Indies.

=== Dutch East Indies ===
Sneevliet lived in the Dutch East Indies (present day Indonesia) from 1913 until 1918, where he quickly became active in the struggle against Dutch colonial rule. In 1914, he was a co-founder of the Indies Social Democratic Association (ISDV), in which both Dutch and Indonesian people were active.

He also returned to union work, becoming a member of the Vereeniging van Spoor- en Tramwegpersoneel, a railway union which was unique in having both Dutch and Indonesian members. Thanks to his experience as a union leader, he soon managed to turn this still fairly moderate union into a more modern and aggressive union, with a majority of Indonesian members. This union later formed the base for the Indonesian communist movement.

The ISDV was strictly anti-capitalist and agitated against the Dutch colonial regime and the privileged Indonesian elites. This led to much resistance against the ISDV and Sneevliet himself, from conservative circles and from the more moderate SDAP. In 1916 therefore he left the SDAP and joined the SDP, the predecessor of the Communist Party of the Netherlands (CPN).

After the Russian Revolution of 1917, Sneevliet's radicalism gained enough support amongst both the Indonesian population as well as Dutch soldiers and especially sailors that the Dutch authorities got nervous. Sneevliet was therefore forced to leave the Dutch East Indies in 1918. ISDV was repressed by the Dutch colonial authorities.

=== Comintern functionary ===
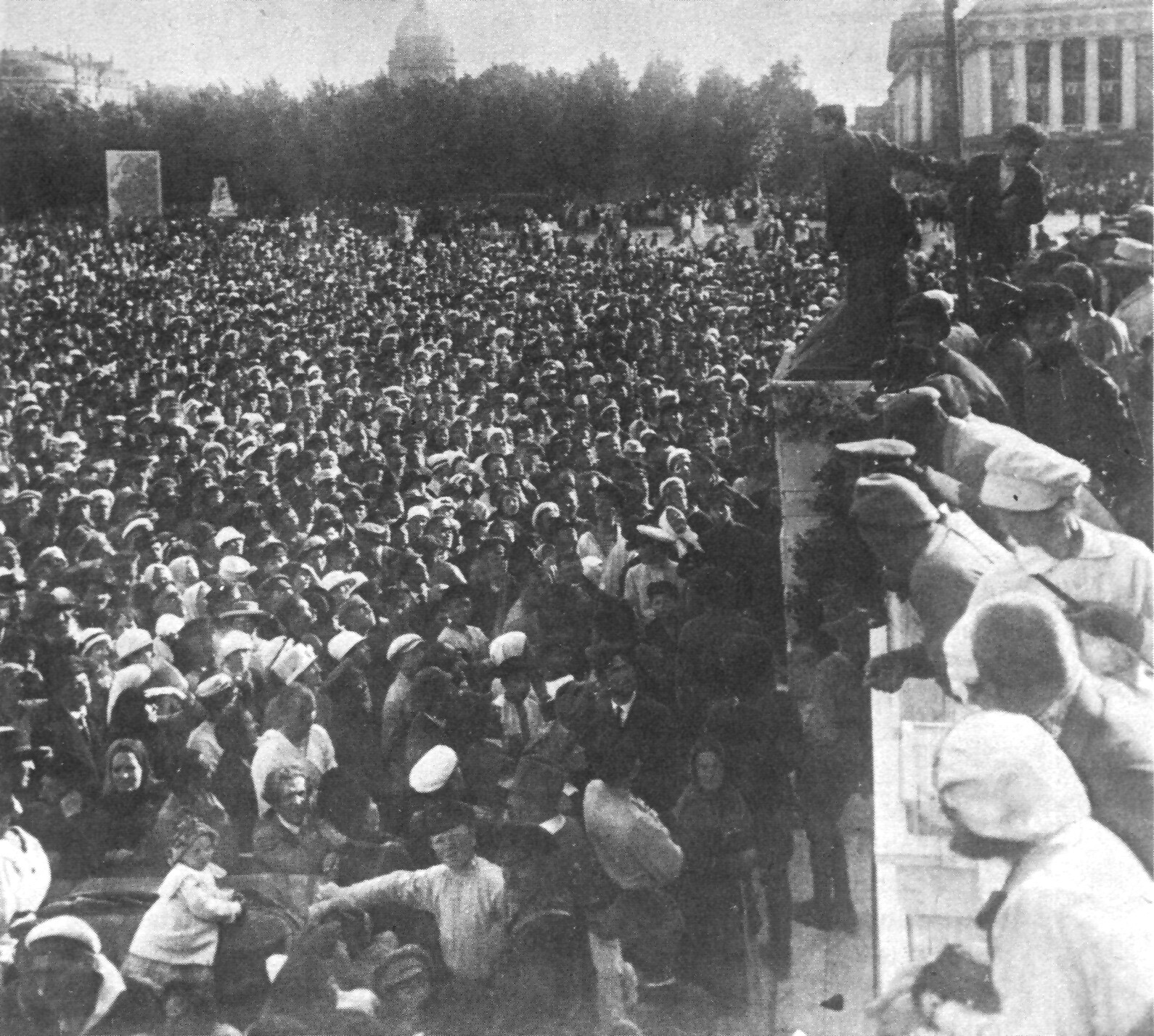
Henk Sneevliet (top right, on the tribune) speaking before the Winter Palace in Petrograd in 1920. Trotsky is making the Russian translation.

Back in the Netherlands, Sneevliet became active in the fledgling communist movement, becoming a salaried official of the party's National Labor Secretariat (NAS) and helping to organize a major transportation strike in 1920.

The same year he was also present at the 2nd World Congress of the Communist International in Moscow as a representative of the Partai Komunis Indonesia (PKI), which was the successor to Sneevliet's ISDV. There Sneevliet — using the pseudonym Maring — was elected a member of the Executive Committee of the Communist International.

==== China ====
Vladimir Lenin was impressed enough by him to send him as a Communist International (Comintern) representative to the Republic of China. Following Grigori Voitinsky's preparatory work in Shanghai to form a communist party in 1920, Sneevliet arrived in China with Vladimir Neumann in June 1921 and urged Li Da to convene a formal congress. Sneevliet was present at the founding congress of the Chinese Communist Party in July 1921. In addition to the pseudonym Maring, Sneevliet used the names Martin, Philips, and Sentot during this period.

Sneevliet was an advocate of cooperation with the non-communist nationalist Kuomintang, headed by Sun Yat-sen, with whom he had personally established contact on behalf of the Comintern. In 1923, Sun Yat-sen offered Sneevliet a full-time role in the Kuomintang as an adviser, but Sneevliet turned down the offer. He also rejected a separate offer from the Soviets to run the Guangzhou outpost of the Soviet state news agency ROSTA.

Early in 1924, Sneevliet returned to Moscow, his tenure as a Comintern representative to China at an end.

=== Back in the Netherlands ===
Sneevliet returned to the Netherlands from Moscow in 1924 to assume the position of secretary of the National Labor Secretariat (NAS). He joined the executive committee of the Communist Party of Holland in 1925 but the two years were marked by worsening factional relations between Sneevliet and his co-thinkers and the bulk of the CPN leadership. The denouement came in 1927, when Sneevliet broke all ties with the CPH and the Comintern.

In 1929, Sneevliet formed a new political party, the Revolutionary Socialist Party (RSP). This organization concentrated on national issues, gaining some successes in organizing the unemployed movement, strike actions, and the struggle against the rise of fascism.

He remained interested in Indonesian affairs and in 1933 was sentenced to five months imprisonment for his solidarity actions for the Dutch and Indonesian sailors who took part in the mutiny on "De Zeven Provinciën", which was put down by an air bombardment in which twenty-three sailors were killed and which at the time aroused considerable passions in the Dutch public opinion. That same year, while still imprisoned, Sneevliet was elected a member of the Lower House of parliament, a position in which he remained until 1937.

In August 1933, the RSP signed the "Declaration of the Four" along with the International Communist League, led by Leon Trotsky, the OSP and the Socialist Workers' Party of Germany. This declaration was intended as a step towards a new Fourth International of revolutionary socialist parties. In 1938, Sneevliet and the RSP ultimately refused to join this new international organization, however, thereby breaking with the Trotskyist movement. Instead the RSP became a part of the International Bureau of Revolutionary Socialist Unity along with the Independent Labour Party (Britain) and the Workers' Party of Marxist Unification (POUM) of Spain.

In Amsterdam, Sneevliet (as "Henricus" or "Henryk Sneevliet") was among Ignace Reiss's circle, which included: Henriette Roland-Holst, Hildo Krop, Princess Juliana of the Netherlands, "Professor Carvalho" (Ricardo Carvalho Calero), and "H. C. Pieck" (Henri Pieck). Sneevliet had informed Victor Serge that Reiss, a leading GPU official in the Netherlands was "heartbroken" by the Zinoviev Trial and had crossed over to the anti-Stalinist Opposition. Sneevliet and Serge waited in Rheims to meet him on 5 September 1937, but he never arrived. In his autobiography Serge described Sneevliet that day as thus: "his face wore a persistent frown amid its close lines, but he never lost heart." The train ticket to visit Sneevliet was found in his pocket when he (Reiss) was assassinated in Lausanne, Switzerland.

With James Maxton of the ILP, Sneevliet headed deputations to civil war Spain on behalf of the international campaign for socialists there persecuted after the May Days of Barcelona. "They harassed Republican Ministers with their questions and protests and proceeded to knock on the doors of the Communist Party's secret prisons." Despite expecting to hear that the POUM Executive had been summarily executed, the campaign, according to Victor Serge in the 1940s, saved their lives and was "a real moral triumph".

=== Final years ===
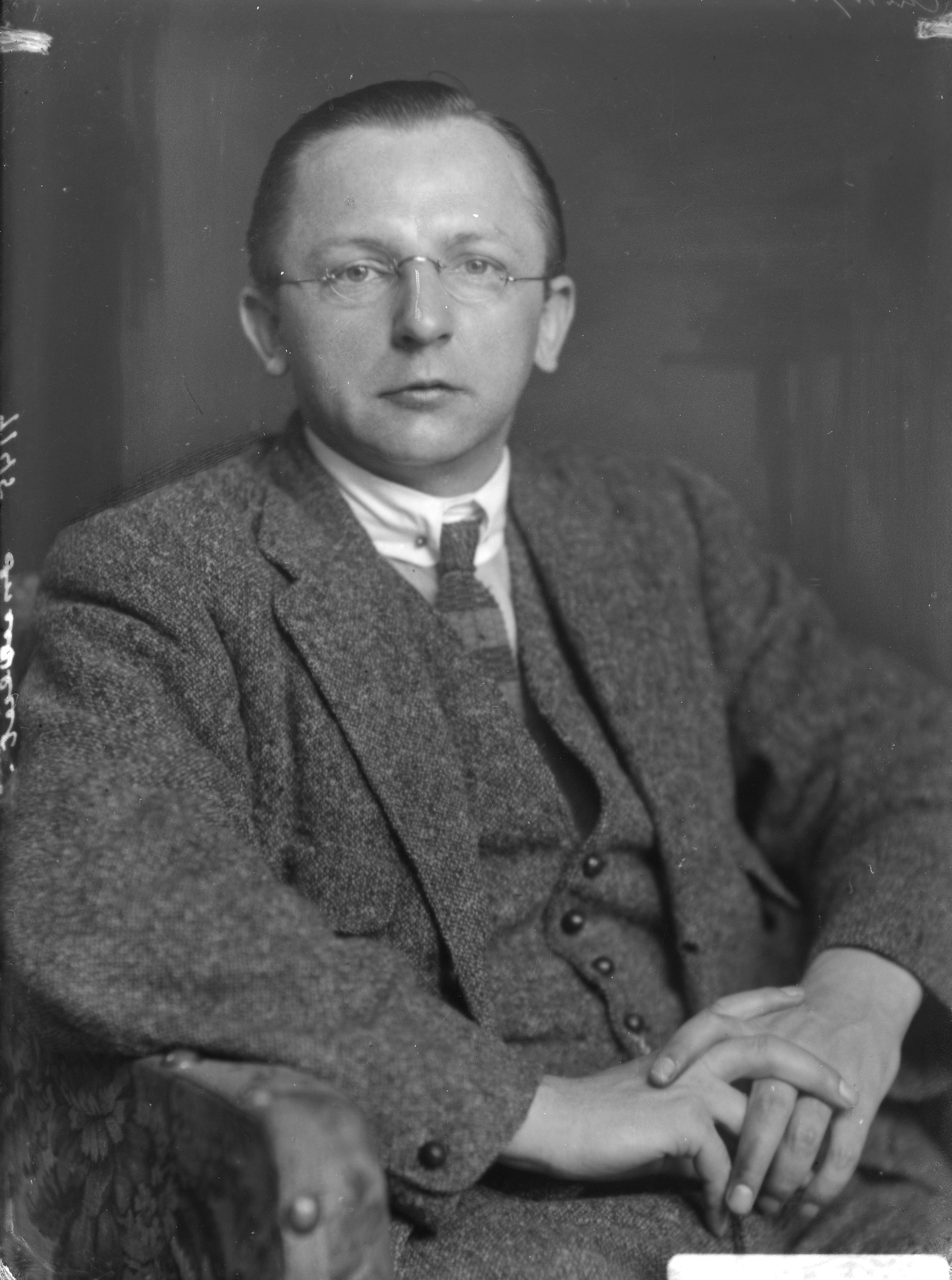
Henk Sneevliet portrait from Jacob Merkelbach

The worsening political climate both abroad and nationally and the constant struggle against both the communist and social democratic parties, as well as government interference, took a heavy toll on Sneevliet and his small organization.

However, when war broke out on 10 May 1940, Sneevliet immediately dissolved the, legally-registered RSAP and began preparations to launch an illegal, underground party. Six months later, with Willem Dolleman and Abraham Menist, he founded a resistance group against the German occupation, the Marx-Lenin-Luxemburg-Front (MLL-Front). This was largely engaged in producing propaganda for socialism and opposing the Nazi occupation of the Netherlands and as such was heavily involved with the February strike of 1941 against antisemitic roundups. Despite the difficulties that repression caused, they were able to connect with the Belgian revolutionary Marxists Contre le Courant. Their actions led to fierce repression by the German Security Police and in March-April of 1942, the majority of the group's leaders was arrested, including Sneevliet.

== Death ==
As a known communist, Sneevliet had to go into hiding even before he started his resistance activities. In the underground he edited a clandestine newspaper called Spartakus and took part in other activities. For two years he managed to keep out of the hands of the Nazis, but in April 1942 they finally arrested him and the rest of the MLL-Front leadership. Their execution took place in the Amersfoort KZ on 12 April 1942. It was reported that they went to their deaths singing "The Internationale".

== See also ==
- Communism in Sumatra
- Partai Komunis Indonesia (PKI)

== Footnotes ==
Trade union offices
Preceded by Jan Oudegeest	President of the Dutch Association of Railway and Tramway Employees; 1911–1912	Succeeded by Petrus Moltmaker
