= HNLMS De Zeven Provinciën (1909) =

Royal Netherlands Navy coastal defence ship

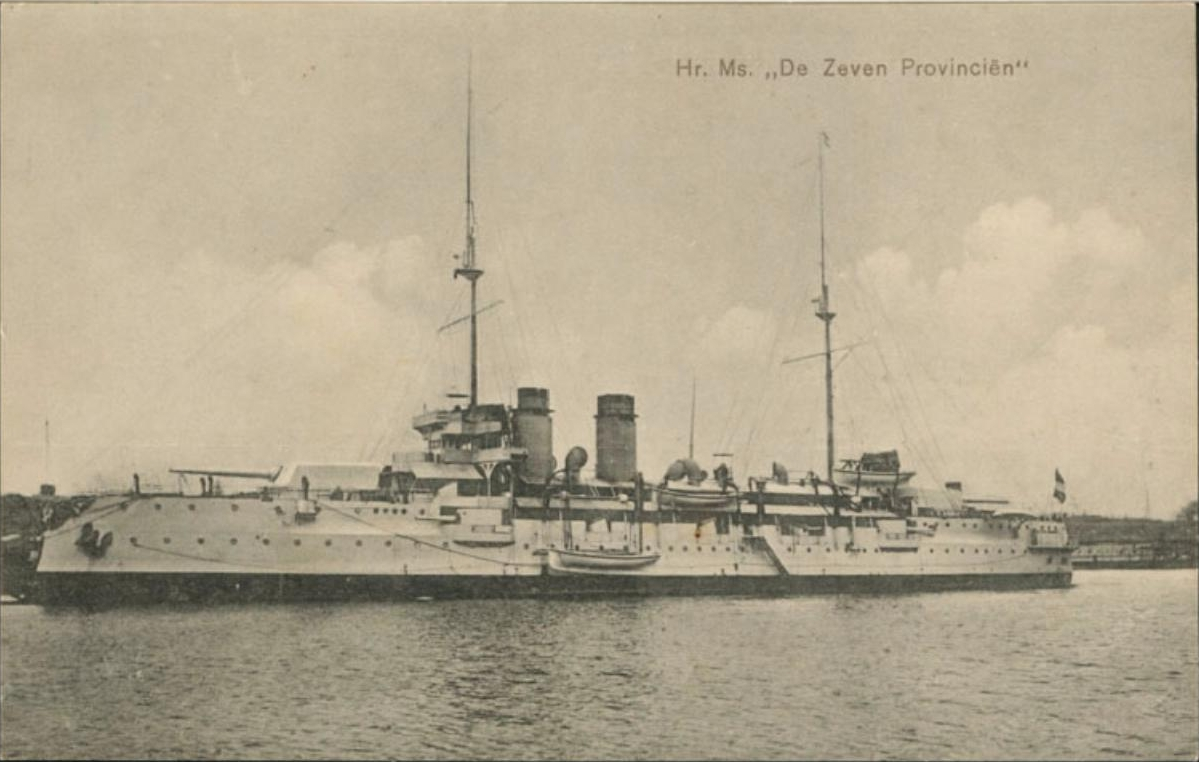
- De Zeven Provinciën in 1910

History

Netherlands
- Name: De Zeven Provinciën
- Namesake: Seven Provinces
- Builder: Rijkswerf, Amsterdam
- Laid down: 7 February 1908
- Launched: 15 March 1909
- Commissioned: 6 October 1910
- Renamed: Soerabaja, 1936
- Namesake: Surabaya
- Fate: Sunk by aerial attack 18 February 1942

Japan
- Name: Unknown
- Acquired: Salvaged in 1942 and used as a battery ship
- Fate: Bombed by aircraft and sunk, 1943

General characteristics
- Type: Coastal defence ship
- Displacement: 6,530 tons
- Length: 101.5 m (333 ft 0 in)
- Beam: 17.1 m (56 ft 1 in)
- Draught: 6.15 m (20 ft 2 in)
- Propulsion: 8,000 hp (6,000 kW), two shafts
- Speed: 16 knots (30 km/h)
- Complement: 452
- Armament: 2 × 28 cm/42.5 (2 × 1); 4 × 15 cm/40 (4 × 1); 10 × 7.5 cm/55 (10 × 1); 4 × 1-pdr (4 × 1)
- Armour: 2 in (5.1 cm) deck; 5.9 in (15 cm) belt; 7.75 in (19.7 cm) barbette; 8 in (20 cm) conning tower; 9.8 in (25 cm) turret

HNLMS De Zeven Provinciën was a Royal Netherlands Navy coastal defence ship in service from 1910 until 1942.

She served part of her career in the Dutch East Indies, from 1911 to 1918 and from 1921 onward. During the 1920s, her crew included the future Rear Admiral Karel Doorman. She suffered a high-profile mutiny on 5 February 1933, which had far-reaching implications for politics in the Netherlands. She was renamed Soerabaja in 1936.

On 18 February 1942, Soerabaja was sunk by Japanese bombers. The Japanese raised her and used her as a battery ship; one report is that she was sunk again by Allied aircraft in 1943; a second report is that she was raised two years after being sunk by the Japanese but was wrecked five miles north of Djamoenjan Reef, Indonesia.

== Design ==
De Zeven Provinciën was a small cruiser-sized warship that sacrificed speed and range for armor and armament. She was armed with two 283 mm (11 in) L/42.5, four 150 mm (5.9 in) L/40, ten 75 mm (3 in) L/55, and four 37 mm (1.5 in) guns, in addition to a few 75 mm (3 in) mortars.

She was 101.5 metres (333 ft) long, had a beam of 17.1 metres (56 ft) and a draft of 6.15 metres (20.2 ft), and displaced 6,530 tons. She had a crew of 448 and was able to reach 16 knots.

== Service history ==
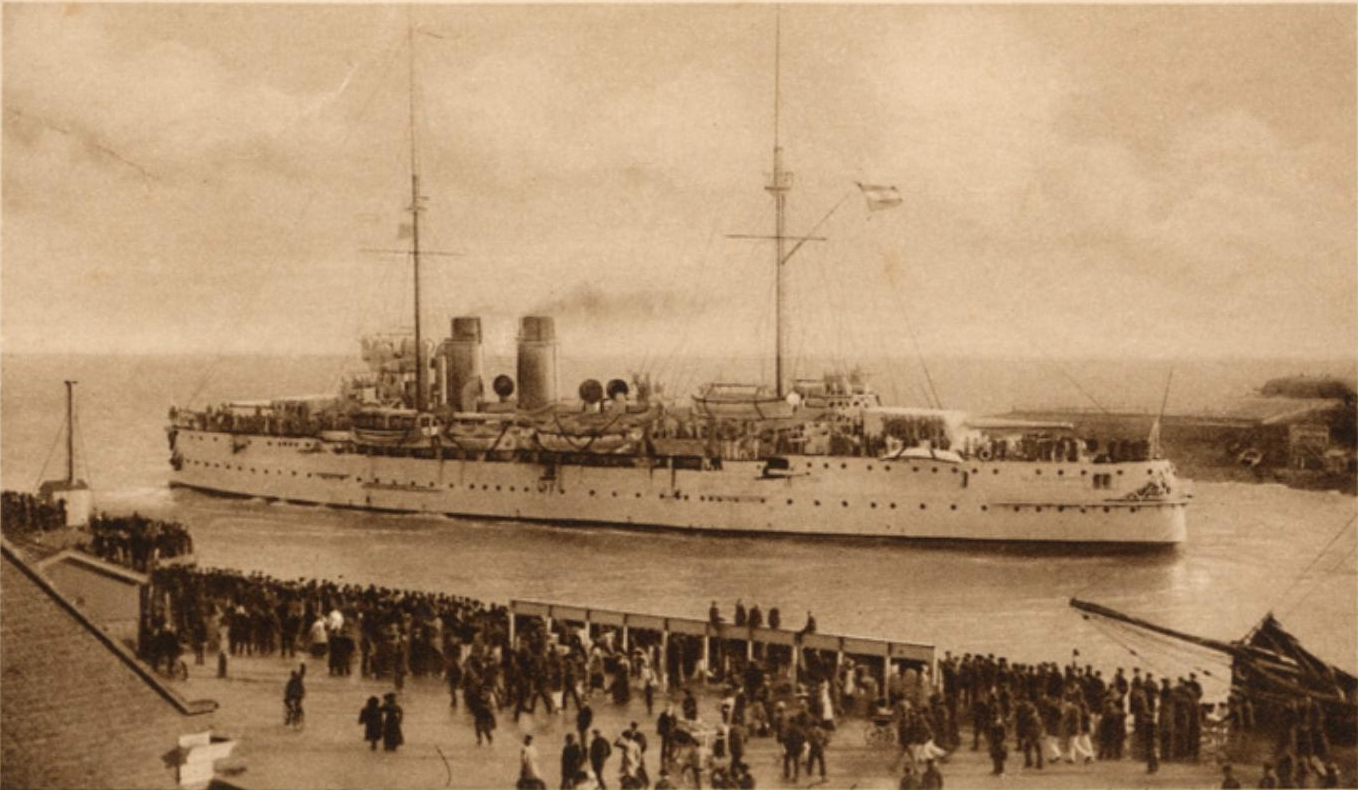
De Zeven Provinciën leaving the port of Den Helder, 1910

The ship was launched and christened at the Rijkswerf in Amsterdam by, Prince Henry on 15 March 1909. She was commissioned into the Royal Netherlands Navy on 6 October 1910. On 21 November that year she left the port of Den Helder for the Dutch East Indies. The route she took led by South Africa and she arrived at Surabaya on 25 January 1911.

On 23 January 1912 De Zeven Provinciën hit a cliff while making a trip around Sumatra. After offloading coal and ammunition she pulled loose. After this she docked at Singapore. She returned 25 April to Surabaya.

On 4 April 1918, during the final stages of World War I, the ship and Koningin Regentes escorted the passenger ships Vondel, Kawi, Rindjani and Grotius to the port of Tanjung Priok. The ships were intercepted in the eastern parts of the Indian archipelago by the two warships after Dutch merchant ships had been confiscated by British and American naval forces, exercising the right of angary.

After eight years in the Dutch East Indies the ship left on 20 November 1918, going from Tanjung Priok through the Panama Canal and by New York to Den Helder. She arrived on 1 April 1919 and then left for maintenance at Amsterdam.

On 9 November 1921 the ship left for the second and last time for the Dutch East Indies. After arriving, she served as artillery instruction ship.

== Mutiny ==
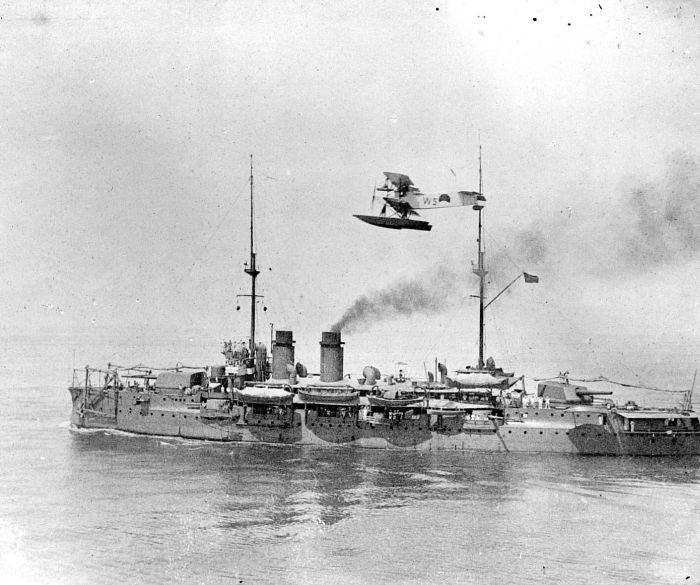
De Zeven Provinciën with a Van Berkel W-A floatplane above

While off the northwest tip of Sumatra, mutiny broke out on 5 February 1933. Part of the mixed Dutch and Indonesian crew seized control of the ship, keeping it in operation and sailing it southwards along the Sumatran coast. After six days during which the mutineers remained defiant, the Dutch Defence Minister Laurentius Nicolaas Deckers authorized an attack by military aircraft. On 10 February 1933 a task group of five Dornier 'Wal' flying boats (D-7, D-8, D-11, D-18 and D-35) and three Fokker 'T' bombers was launched. At 9:18 AM a 50 kg bomb from D-11 struck the ship, killing 23 mutineers, whereupon the others immediately surrendered. In the fierce controversy which broke out immediately afterwards, it was asserted that this outcome was not deliberate, and that the only intention was to intimidate the mutineers. Incidentally, this was an early demonstration of the vulnerability of surface ships to aerial bombardment, of which this ship itself was to be a victim 10 years later. However, at the time naval experts in the Netherlands and elsewhere paid little attention to this aspect, the whole event being mainly discussed in terms of the putting down of a mutiny.

=== Cause ===
The cause and motivation of the mutiny was the focus of considerable debate, both in the Dutch public opinion and political system at the time, and among historians up to the present. Dutch researchers such as Loe de Jong believe that an active communist cell had been among the sailors—which was asserted in a highly inflammatory manner by nationalist right-wingers at the time, while in later periods Dutch and Indonesian communists were happy enough to be credited with what became a heroic myth in left-wing circles. However, J. C. H. Blom asserts that the mutiny was essentially spontaneous and unplanned, resulting from protest at pay cuts and bad working conditions, as well as generally poor morale in the Dutch Royal Navy at the time. From that point of view, the case of De Zeven Provinciën is reminiscent of the Invergordon Mutiny of sailors in the Royal Navy a year and half earlier, which ended without the use of lethal force. Indeed, Dutch sailors may have been inspired by their British counterparts' mutiny, which had been international news at the time.

The harsher stance of the Dutch government in relation to the mutineers might be partially attributed to the British mutiny taking place in Britain itself, while the Dutch one happened in the context of a restive colony where an independence movement was already active, but which the Dutch contemporary political establishment was absolutely determined to retain. Peter Boomgaard links the mutiny with a relatively high level of social unrest and strikes in the Dutch Indies during the 1932–1934 period, which the colonial authorities attempted to suppress by force.

=== Political consequence ===
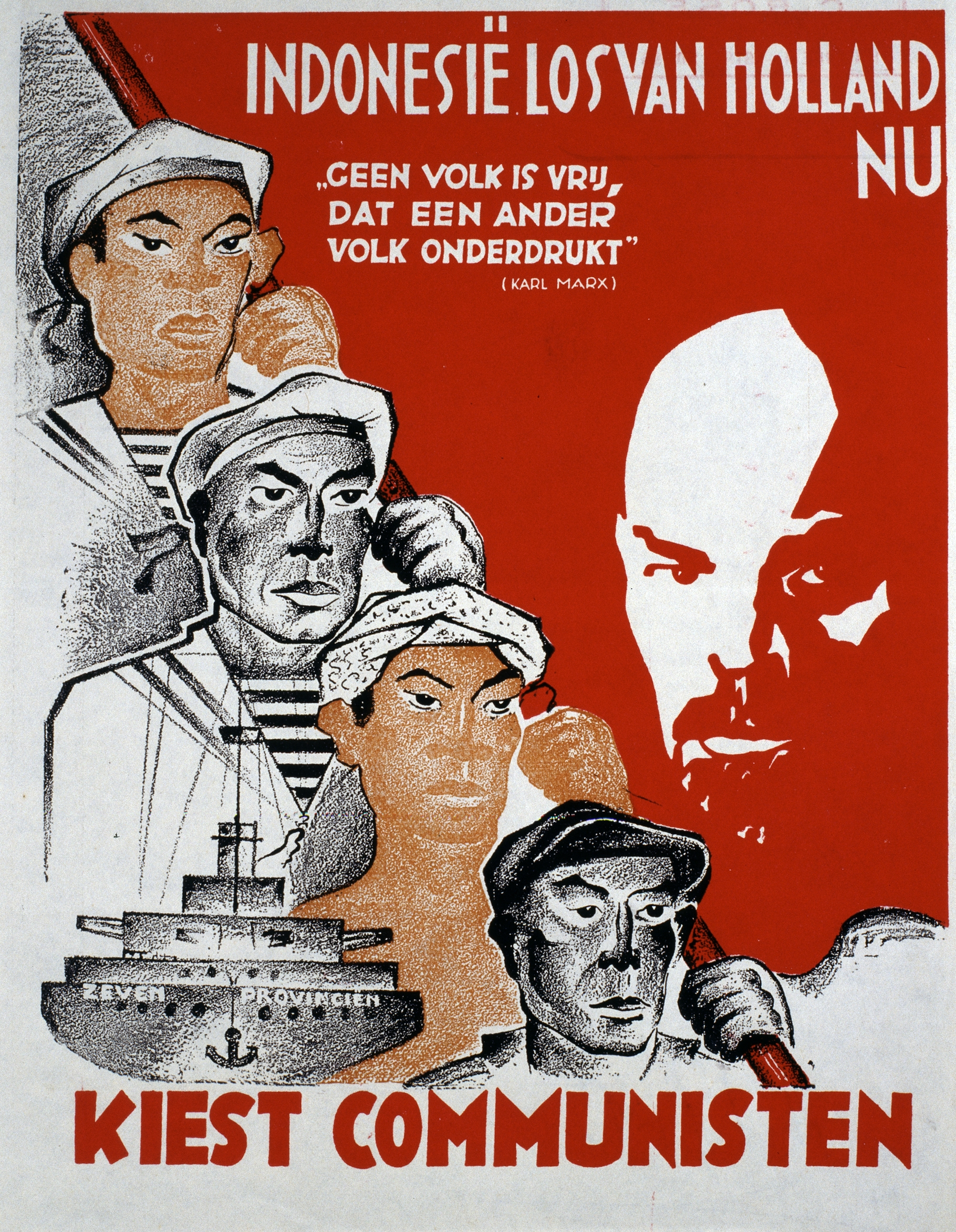
A Communist Party Holland poster for the 1933 general election featuring the De Zeven Provinciën mutiny

In the Netherlands, the mutiny and its bloody conclusion had a deep impact, a blot on the record of Defence Minister Deckers and Prime Minister Ruijs de Beerenbrouck. Historian Louis de Jong accounts it as one of the most significant Dutch events in the 1930s. As J. C. H. Blom notes, the main effect of the spectacular incident – at least in the short term – was to cause a shift to the right, clearly manifest in the general elections two months later, in April 1933. The government proceeded to root out social-democratic influences among naval unions and civil servants, since "such 'unreliable elements' threatened the loyalty of the armed forces and with it the nation's hold on its seemingly indispensable overseas possessions". In this it was supported, as Blom notes, by the officer corps as well as by the predominantly burgerlijk sociopolitical groups in the country (Calvinist, Catholic, and liberal). Apprehensive of appearing "unpatriotic", the Social Democratic Workers' Party was unable to offer an effective defence, and in the April elections lost two seats, setting back—as it turned out only temporarily—their march towards strength and respectability in the political mainstream.

Conversely, the Anti Revolutionary Party which ran a strong law-and-order campaign gained two seats and its leader Hendrikus Colijn – himself with a bloody past in the colonial army at the Indies – became the next prime minister. Moreover, in the direct aftermath of the mutiny a new party known as the Alliance for National Reconstruction (Verbond voor Nationaal Herstel) suddenly emerged, with firm defence of the eastern colonial empire as its main elections plank, and with only two months' existence won thirty-thousand votes and a seat in parliament. Moreover, a report by the Dutch Intelligence Service quoted by Blom attributes the meteoric rise of Anton Mussert's National Socialist Movement in the Netherlands, from one thousand members in January 1933 to 22,000 a year later, to both Hitler's coming to power in neighbouring Germany and to the uprising on De Zeven Provinciën – the two events being virtually simultaneous. The effect turned out to be short-term, however, with the Dutch Nazi Party politically moribund by 1937.

The single voice in Dutch politics to clearly and outspokenly support the De Zeven Provinciën mutineers was the left-communist Revolutionary Socialist Party (Dutch: Revolutionair Socialistische Partij), whose leader Henk Sneevliet had been among the founders of what was to become the Indonesian Communist Party, and who was sentenced to five months prison term for hailing the mutiny as "the beginning of the anti-colonial revolution". Sneevliet's outspoken position was used in the aforementioned right-wing campaign. However, for its constituency – mainly left-leaning intellectuals, especially in the more cosmopolitan capital Amsterdam – the RSP raised a large and effective campaign with such slogans as: "From the Cell to Parliament", "Make Sneevliet the public prosecutor in the Second Chamber" and "I accuse" (a clear reference to Émile Zola's "J'accuse"). The campaign worked and the party won a single parliamentary seat, the only such success in its history, and thus got Sneevliet released from prison.

=== Name change ===
The ship was taken out of service in July that year and was modified to serve as a training ship. In 1936 she was renamed HNLMS Soerabaja. It might be no accident that the purely Dutch name De Zeven Provinciën was changed to the name of a major city of the Indies. (Note: The British also changed the name of their Atlantic Fleet, in which the Invergordon Mutiny happened, to the Home Fleet, ostensibly to purge the memory of the mutiny)

== Loss ==
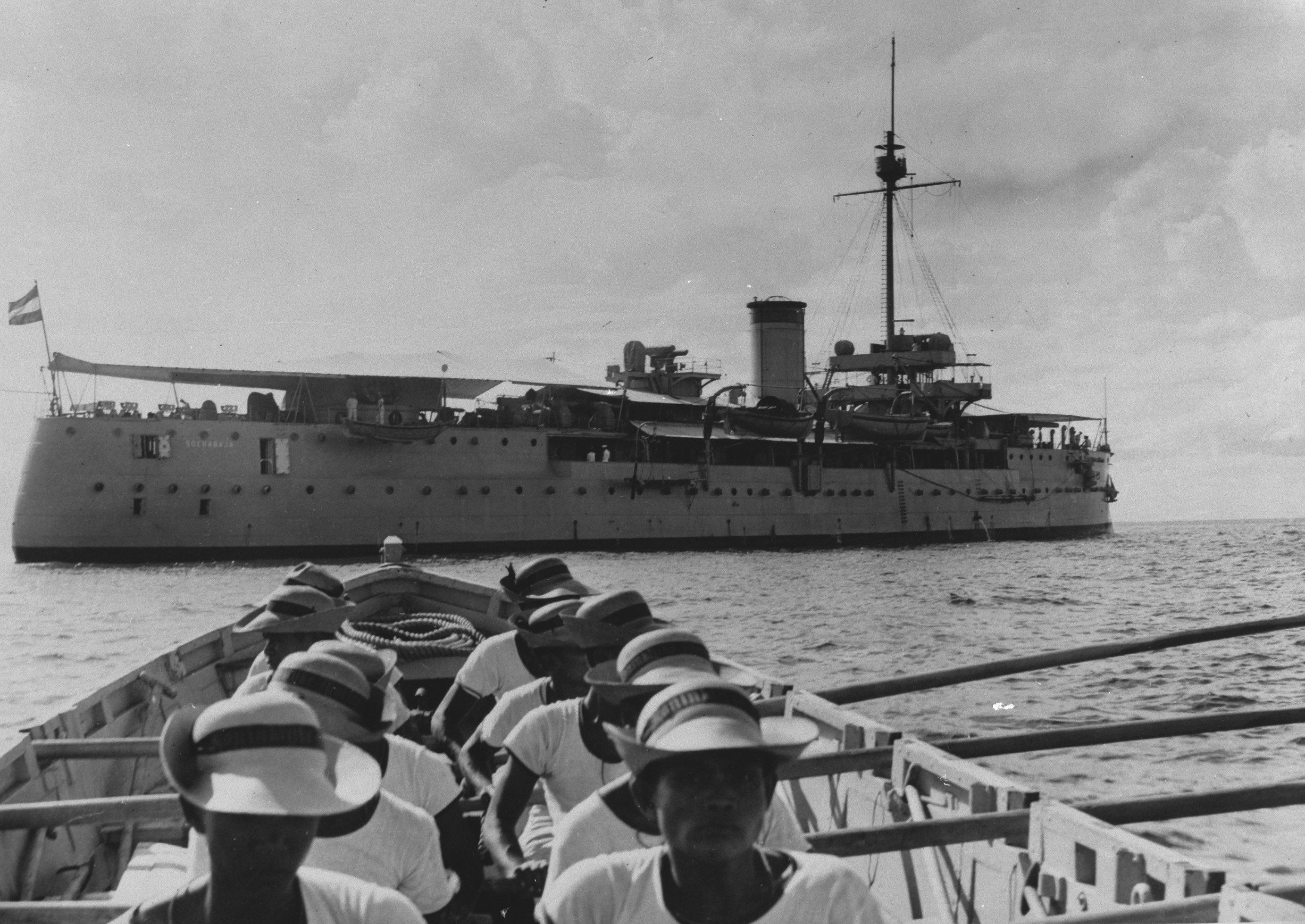
Soerabaja as training ship

On 18 February 1942, a few days before the outbreak of the Battle of the Java Sea, Soerabaja was sunk by Japanese G4M bombers in the harbour of city whose name she bore – Surabaya, headquarters of the Dutch Navy in the Indies.

Unlike most other Dutch ships sunk February and March 1942 far from shore, Soerabaja lay in shallow enough waters that the Japanese, once they were in control, were able to salvage and raise her up. In Japanese service she was used as a battery ship. Her name in this period is not on record.

In the following year, 1943, she was hit by Allied aerial bombardment and sank to the bottom, this time permanently.

One of the ship's main armament is preserved at the Loka Jala Crana Naval Museum in Morokrembangan, Surabaya.

== See also ==
- Spithead and Nore mutinies
- Royal Indian Navy Mutiny
- Chilean naval mutiny of 1931
- Kronstadt rebellion
- Wilhelmshaven mutiny
- Invergordon Mutiny
- Revolt of the Lash
- 1936 Naval Revolt (Portugal)
