= Marx–Lenin–Luxemburg Front =

Marx-Lenin-Luxemburg-Front Marx-Lenin-Luxemburg-front
- Abbreviation: MLL-front
- Leader: Henk Sneevliet
- Founded: 1940
- Dissolved: April 12, 1942
- Preceded by: Revolutionary Socialist Workers' Party
- Succeeded by: Committee of Revolutionary Marxists; Communist League Spartacus
- Newspaper: Spartacus
- Membership (1941): 500
- Ideology: Left communism Anti-fascism
- Political position: Far-left

The Marx-Lenin-Luxemburg-Front was a resistance movement founded by Henk Sneevliet, Willem Dolleman and Abraham Menist, some months after the German invasion of the Netherlands on 10 May 1940. It lasted until April 1942, when the entire leadership was arrested by the Germans, who executed them on 12 April of the same year.

The Marx-Lenin-Luxemburg-Front, or MLL-Front, was the clandestine successor to Sneevliet's political party, the Revolutionair-Socialistische Arbeiderspartij (RSAP), which had been disbanded immediately after the German invasion, when Sneevliet had to go into hiding to avoid arrest.

The MLL-Front was largely active as a propaganda group and had its own magazine, Spartacus, which had a printrun of 5,000 copies and appeared bi-weekly. It was particularly active against the anti-Jewish measures taken by the Nazis and participated in the 1941 February strike against these measures.

With the arrest and execution of its leadership in April 1942, the MLL-front split into two on political differences, into the Comité van Revolutionaire Marxisten (Committee of Revolutionary Marxists) and the Communistenbond Spartacus (Communist League Spartacus). These were far less influential than the MLL-Front was.

The MLL-front was one of the first, if not the first major resistance group to start up in the Netherlands in World War II. At its peak, it may have had some 500 members. Its bi-weekly publication Spartacus with a printrun of 5,000 was one of the most influential underground newspapers of the first part of the war; the total printrun of the underground press at this time has been estimated to be about 55,000.

== Sources ==
- De Groene 13-04-2002: Profiel: Henk Sneevliet (in Dutch)
- From the RSAP to the ‘Marx-Lenin-Luxembourg Front’: The Sneevliet Tendency
- Dutch Trotskyism in World War II (Part 1)
- Audiocollectie Wim Bot over Marx-Lenin-Luxemburg-front en Comité van Revolutionaire Marxisten at the International Institute of Social History
