= Centrist Marxism =

Position between reform and revolution

Centrist Marxism represents a political position between revolution and reformism. Within the Marxist movement, centrism thus entails a specific meaning between the left-wing revolutionary socialism (exemplified by communism and classical Marxism) and the right-wing reformist socialism (exemplified by social democracy, evolutionary socialism, and Marxist revisionism).

For instance, the Independent Social Democratic Party of Germany (USPD) and the British Independent Labour Party (ILP) were both seen as centrist because they oscillated between reaching a socialist economy through reforms and advocating a socialist revolution. The parties that belonged to the Two-and-a-half International (International Working Union of Socialist Parties) and Three-and-a-half internationals (International Revolutionary Marxist Centre), who could not choose between the reformism of the Second International and the revolutionary politics of the Third International, were also exemplary of centrism in this sense. They included the Spanish Workers' Party of Marxist Unification (POUM), the Independent Labour Party (ILP), and Poale Zion. Karl Kautsky, editor of Die Neue Zeit, was a key thinker in this tradition, and his critique of Bolshevism was influential on democratic socialists in the United States.

For Trotskyists and other revolutionary Marxists, centrist in this sense has a pejorative association. They often describe centrism in this sense as opportunistic since it argues for a revolution at some point in the future, but urges reformist practices in the meantime. For example, the Communist League described the ILP as a centrist organisation and therefore "politically shapeless and lacking any clear political position on the problems confronting the revolutionary movement"; British Trotskyist leader Ted Grant called the ILP "typical confused centrists"; and the Socialist Workers Party's journal described the ILP as "a centrist organisation whose revolutionary rhetoric was at odds with its reformist practice". According to a Trotskyist perspective, "the I. L. P. continues to be understood by such authors in terms of Trotsky's own characterisation of the I. L. P., as a centrist party, a party which attempts to stand between 'Marxism and Reformism'".

== See also ==
- Anti-Stalinist left
- Centrism
- Centrumaši
- Left Opposition
- List of left-wing internationals
- Political Centre (Russia)
- Right Opposition
- Third camp
- Twenty-one Conditions
