= Anti-Stalinist left =

Opposition to Stalinism by left-wing political movements

The anti-Stalinist left encompasses various kinds of left-wing political movements that oppose Joseph Stalin, Stalinism, neo-Stalinism and the system of governance that Stalin implemented as leader of the Soviet Union between 1924 and 1953. This term also refers to those that opposed Joseph Stalin and his leadership from within the communist movement, such as Leon Trotsky and the party's Left Opposition.

In recent years, the term may also refer to left and centre-left wing opposition to dictatorship, cult of personality, totalitarianism and police states, all being features commonly attributed to Marxist–Leninist regimes that took inspiration from Stalinism such as the regimes of Kim Il Sung, Enver Hoxha and others, including in the former Eastern Bloc. Some of the notable movements within the anti-Stalinist left have been Trotskyism and Titoism, anarchism and libertarian socialism, left communism and libertarian Marxism, the Right Opposition within the Communist movement, Eurocommunism, ultra-leftism, democratic socialism and social democracy.

== Revolutionary era critiques (pre-1924) ==
A large majority of the political left was initially enthusiastic about the Bolshevik Revolution in the revolutionary era. In the beginning, the Bolsheviks and their policies received much support because the movement was originally painted by Lenin and other leaders in a libertarian light. However, as more politically repressive methods were used, the Bolsheviks steadily lost support from many anarchists and revolutionaries. Prominent anarchist communists and libertarian Marxists such as Sylvia Pankhurst, Rosa Luxemburg, and Emma Goldman were among the first left-wing critics of Bolshevism.

Rosa Luxemburg was heavily critical of the methods that Bolsheviks used to seize power in the October Revolution claiming that it was "not a movement of the people but of the bourgeoisie". Primarily, Luxemburg's critiques were based on the manner in which the Bolsheviks suppressed anarchist movements. In one of her essays published titled "The Nationalities Question in the Russian Revolution", she explains:

To be sure, in all these cases, it was really not the "people" who engaged in these reactionary policies, but only the bourgeois and petit bourgeois classes, who – in sharpest opposition to their own proletarian masses – perverted the "national right of self-determination" into an instrument of their counter-revolutionary class policies.

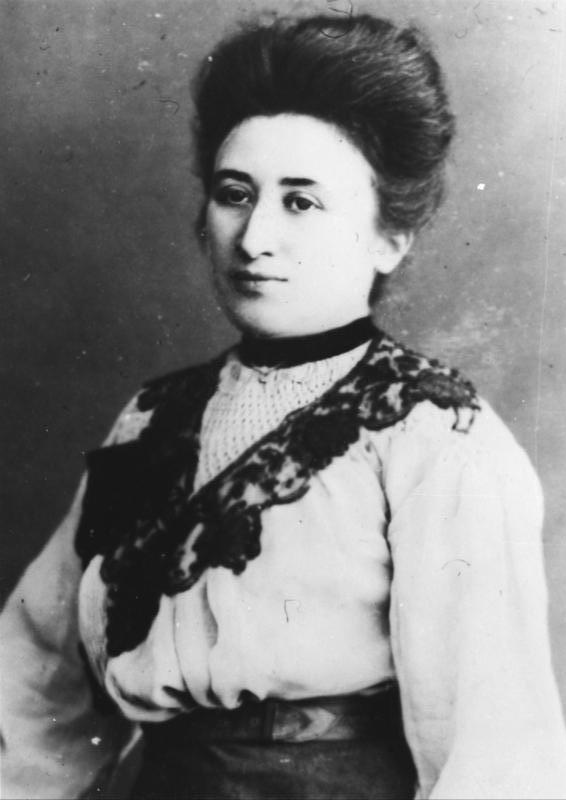
Rosa Luxemburg's political legacy was criticized by Stalin after he rose to power.

Because of her early criticisms toward the Bolsheviks, her legacy was vilified by Stalin once he rose to power. According to Trotsky, Stalin was "often lying about her and vilifying her" in the eyes of the public.

The relations between the anarchists and the Bolsheviks worsened in Soviet Russia due to the suppression of movements like the Kronstadt rebellion and the Makhnovist movement. The Kronstadt rebellion (March 1921) was a key moment during which many libertarian and democratic leftists broke with the Bolsheviks, laying the foundations for the anti-Stalinist left. The American anti-Stalinist socialist Daniel Bell later said:

Every radical generation, it is said, has its Kronstadt. For some it was the Moscow Trials, for others the Nazi-Soviet Pact, for still others Hungary (The Raik Trial or 1956), Czechoslovakia (the defenestration of Masaryk in 1948 or the Prague Spring of 1968), the Gulag, Cambodia, Poland (and there will be more to come). My Kronstadt was Kronstadt.

Another key anti-Stalinist, Louis Fischer, later coined the term "Kronstadt moment" for this.

Like Rosa Luxemburg, Emma Goldman was primarily critical of Lenin's style of leadership, but her focus eventually transferred over to Stalin and his policies as he rose to power. In her essay titled "There Is No Communism in Russia", Goldman details how Stalin "abused the power of his position" and formed a dictatorship. In this text she states:

In other words, by the Central Committee and Politbureau of the Party, both of them controlled absolutely by one man, Stalin. To call such a dictatorship, this personal autocracy more powerful and absolute than any Czar's, by the name of Communism seems to me the acme of imbecility.

Emma Goldman asserted that there was "not the least sign in Soviet Russia even of authoritarian, State Communism". Emma Goldman remained critical of Stalin and the Bolshevik's style of governance up until her death in 1940.

Overall, the left communists and anarchists were critical of the statist, repressive, and totalitarian nature of Marxism–Leninism which eventually carried over to Stalinism and Stalin's policy in general. Conversely, Trotsky argued that he and Lenin had intended to lift the ban on the opposition parties such as the Mensheviks and Socialist Revolutionaries as soon as the economic and social conditions of Soviet Russia had improved.

== After Stalin's rise to power (1924–1930) ==
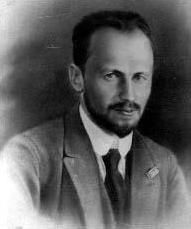
A young Nikolai Bukharin, whose ideas formed the ideological framework of the Right Opposition

He is an unprincipled intriguer, who subordinates everything to the preservation of his own power. He changes his theory according to whom he needs to get rid of.

— Bukharin on Stalin's theoretical position, 1928.

The struggle for power in the Soviet Union after the death of Vladimir Lenin in 1924 saw the development of three major tendencies within the All-Union Communist Party (Bolsheviks). These were described by Trotsky as left, right, and centre tendencies. The Right Opposition was a label formulated by Stalin in Autumn of 1928 for the opposition against certain measures included within the first five-year plan, an opposition which was led by Nikolai Bukharin, Alexei Rykov, Mikhail Tomsky, and their supporters within the Soviet Union that did not follow the so-called "general line of the party". Stalin and his "centre" faction were allied with Bukharin and the Right Opposition from late 1924, with Bukharin elaborating Stalin's theory of socialism in one country. Together, they expelled Trotsky, Kamenev, Zinoviev, and the United Opposition from the Communist Party in December 1927. However, once Trotsky was out of the way and the Left Opposition had been illegalized, Stalin soon turned on his Right Opposition allies. Bukharin and the Right Opposition were, in their turn, sidelined and removed from important positions within the Communist Party and the Soviet government from 1928 to 1930, with Stalin ending the NEP and beginning the first five-year plan.

One of the last attempts of the Right Opposition to resist Stalin was the Ryutin affair in 1932, where a manifesto against the policy of collectivization was circulated; it openly called for "The Liquidation of the dictatorship of Stalin and his clique". Later, some rightists joined a secret bloc with Leon Trotsky, Zinoviev and Kamenev to oppose Stalin. Historian Pierre Broué stated that it dissolved in early 1933.

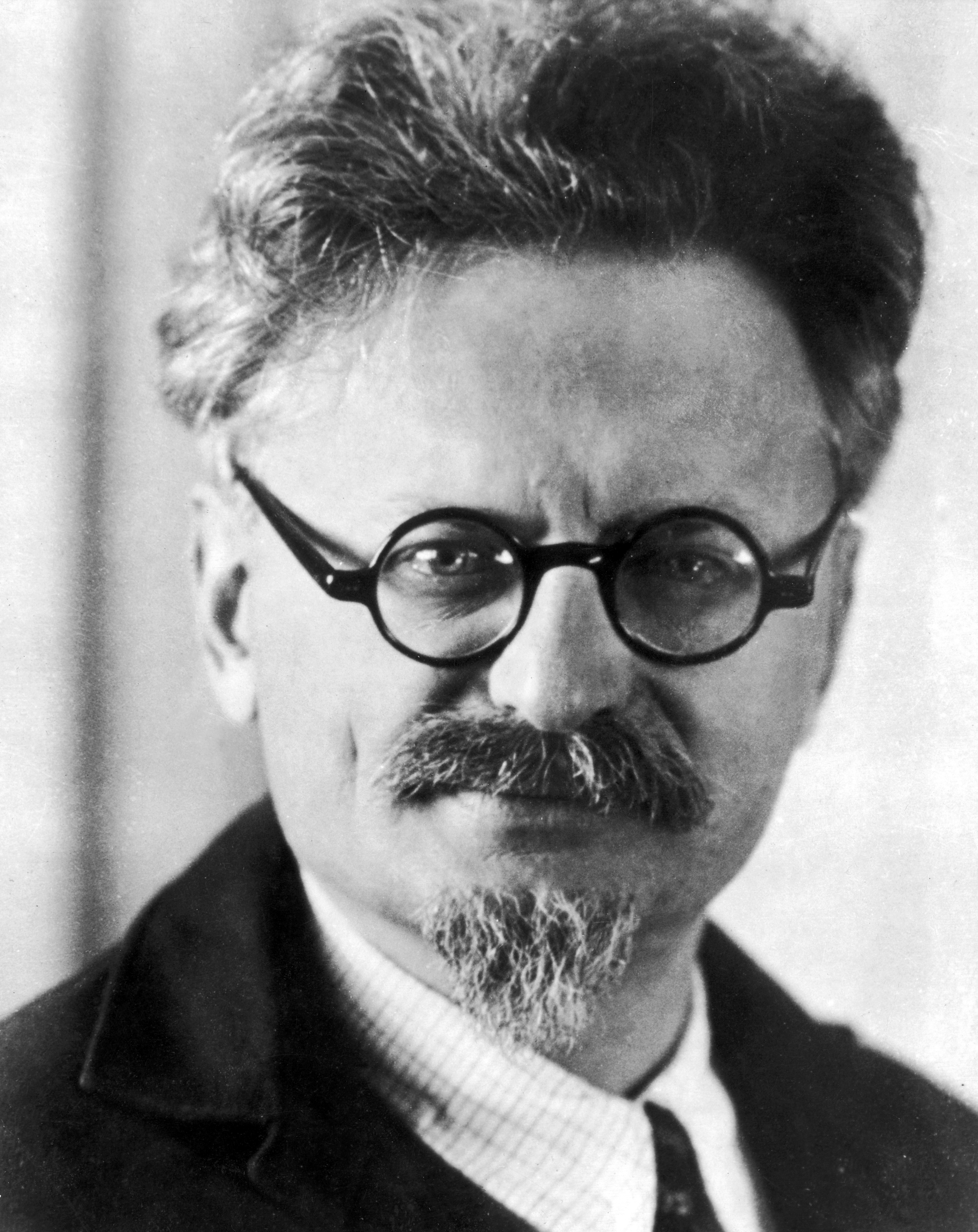
Bolshevik revolutionary Leon Trotsky was exiled by Stalin in February 1929. Trotsky would become the most vocal and prominent critic of Stalinism in the early 20th century.

Leon Trotsky and Stalin disagreed on issues of industrialization and revolutionary tactics. Trotsky believed that there was a need for super-industrialization while Stalin believed in a rapid surge and collectivization, as written in his 5-year plan. Trotsky believed an accelerated global surge to be the answer to institute communism globally. Trotsky was critical of Stalin's methods because he believed the slower pace of collectivization and industrialization to be ineffective in the long run. According to historian Sheila Fitzpatrick, the scholarly consensus is that Stalin appropriated the position of the Left Opposition on such matters as industrialisation and collectivisation. Trotsky also disagreed with Stalin's thesis of Socialism in One Country, believing that the institution of revolution in one state or country would not be as effective as a global revolution. He also criticized how the Socialism in One Country thesis broke with the internationalist traditions of Marxism. Trotskyists believed that a permanent global revolution was the most effective method to ensure the system of communism was enacted worldwide. According to his biographer, Isaac Deutscher, Trotsky explicitly supported proletarian internationalism but was opposed to achieving this via military conquest as seen with his documented opposition to the war with Poland in 1920, proposed armistice with the Entente and temperance with staging anti-British revolts in the Middle East. Overall, Trotsky and his followers were very critical of the lack of internal debate and discussion among Stalinist organizations along with their politically repressive methods.

== The consolidation of Stalin's rule and responding to the rise of fascism in Europe (1930–1939) ==
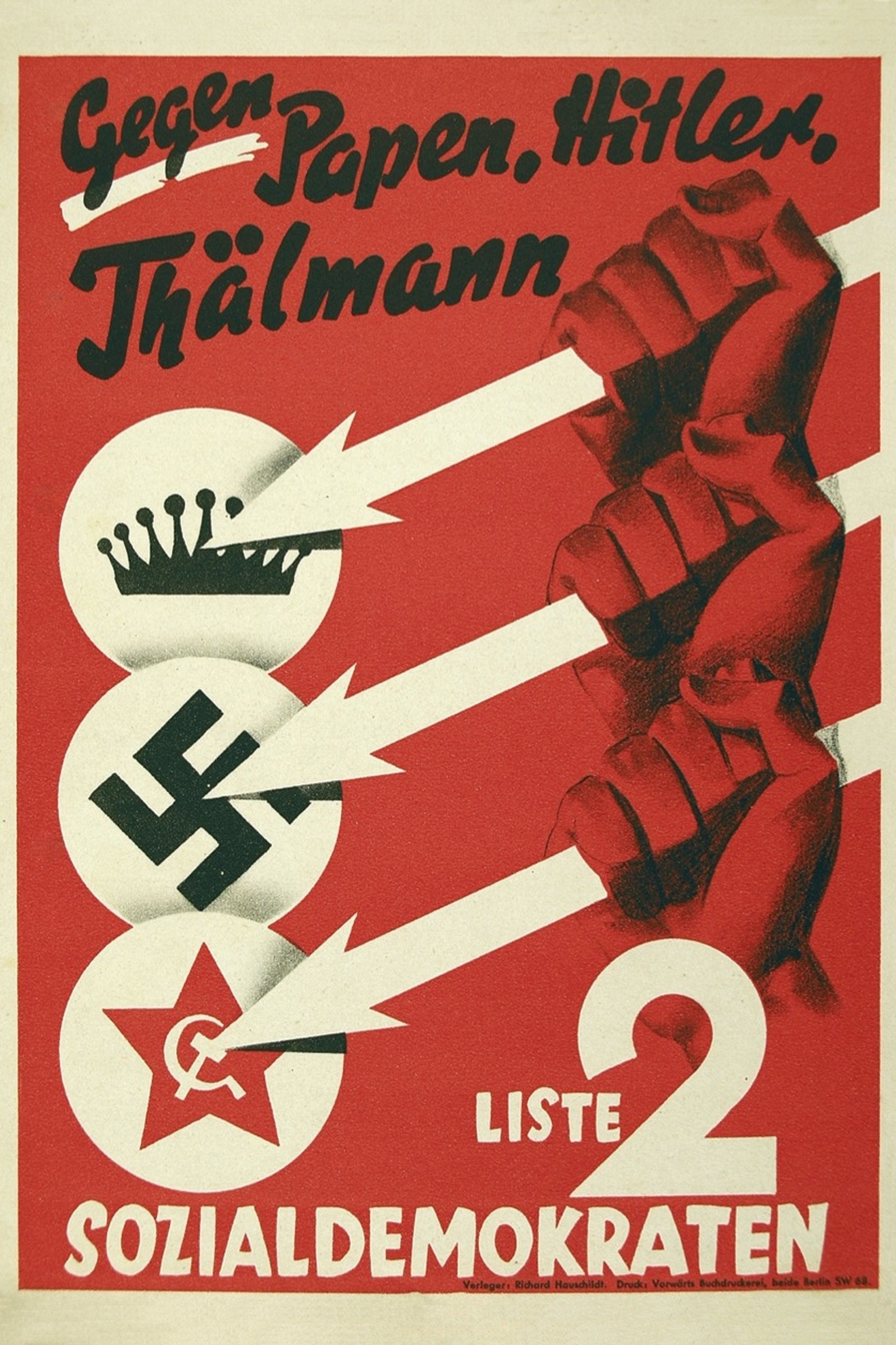
A widely publicized election poster of the Social Democratic Party of Germany from 1932, with the Three Arrows symbol representing resistance against reactionary conservatism, Nazism and Stalinism, alongside the slogan "Against Papen, Hitler, Thälmann"

During the 1930s, critics of Stalin, both inside and outside the Soviet Union, were under heavy attack by the party. According to historian, Bernhard H. Bayerlein, the increasingly "repressive transformation" of the Communist movement "strengthened intermediate oppositionist and anti-Stalinist currents” in the left.

Outside the Communist movement, for example, the International Revolutionary Marxist Centre was founded in 1932 as an international association of left-wing parties which rejected both more moderate mainstream social democracy and the Stalinist Third International.

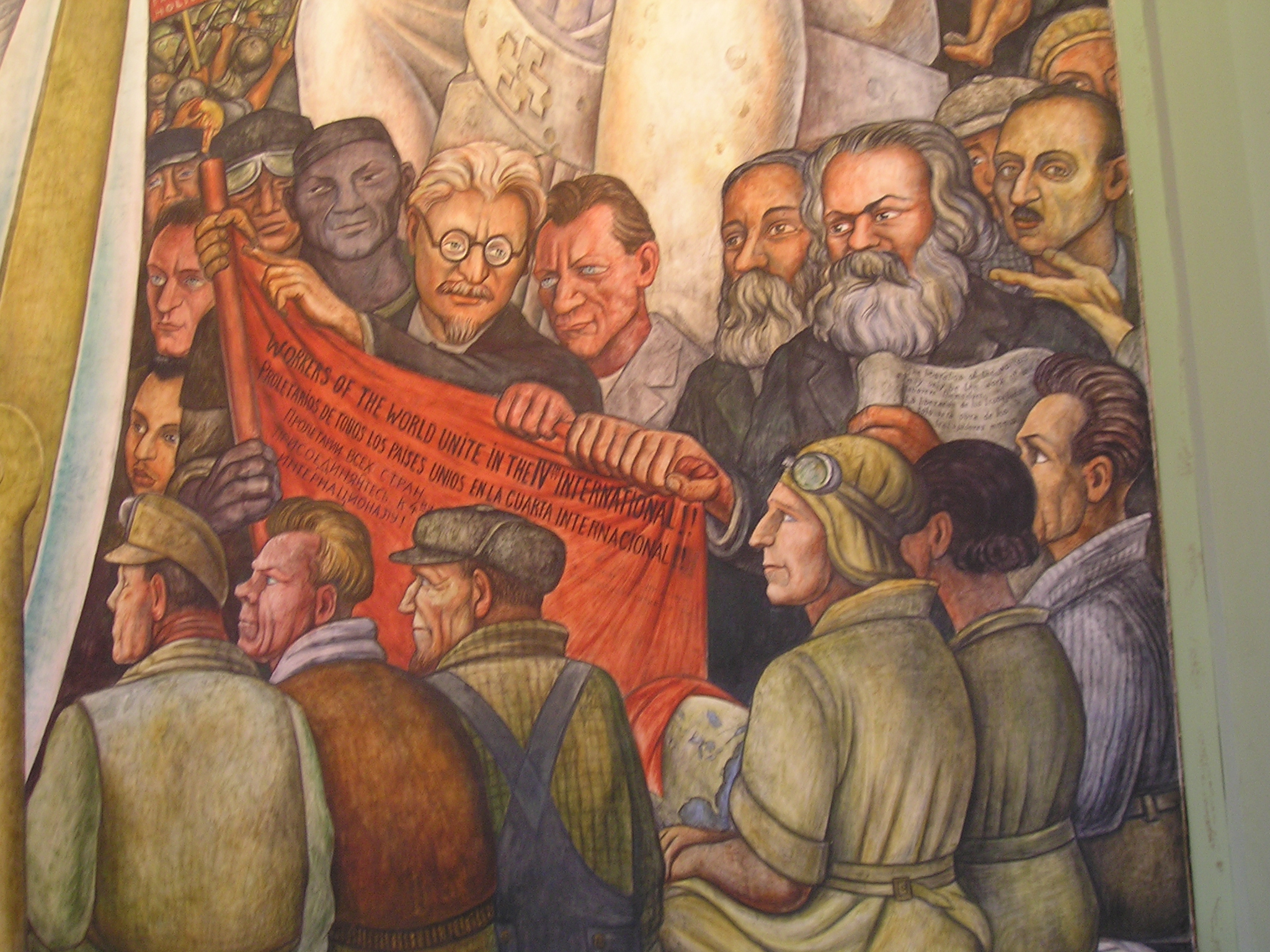
A Diego Rivera mural (Man, Controller of the Universe) depicts Trotsky with Marx and Engels as a true champion of the workers' struggle.

While defending the Russian Revolution from outside aggression, Leon Trotsky and his followers at the same time urged an anti-bureaucratic political revolution against Stalinism to be conducted by the Soviet working class themselves. In 1936, Trotsky called for the restoration of the right of criticism in areas such as economic matters, the revitalization of the trade unions and the free elections of the Soviet parties. Trotsky also opposed the policy of forced collectivisation under Stalin and favoured a voluntary, gradual approach towards agricultural production with greater tolerance for the rights of Soviet Ukrainians. From 1936, Trotsky and his American supporter James P. Cannon described the Soviet Union as a "degenerated workers' state", the revolutionary gains of which should be defended against imperialist aggression despite the emergence of a gangster-like ruling stratum, the party bureaucracy.

The Great Purge occurred from 1936 to 1938 as a result of growing internal tensions between the critics of Stalin but eventually turned into an all-out cleansing of "anti-Soviet elements". A majority of those targeted were peasants and minorities, but anarchists and democratic socialist opponents were also targeted for their criticisms of the severely repressive political techniques that Stalin used. Many were executed or sent to Gulag prison camps extrajudicially. It is estimated that during the Great Purge, casualties ranged from 600,000 to over 1 million people.

With all the greater frankness can I state how, in my view, the Soviet government should act in case of a fascist upheaval in Germany. In their place, I would, at the very moment of receiving telegraphic news of this event, sign a mobilisation order calling up several age groups. In the face of a mortal enemy, when the logic of the situation points to inevitable war, it would be irresponsible and unpardonable to give that enemy time to establish himself, to consolidate his positions, to conclude alliances ... and to work out the plan to attack.

— Trotsky describing the military measures he would have taken in place of Stalin to negate the rise of Hitler in 1932.

Concurrently, fascism was rising across Europe. Initially, during the Comintern's "third period", Communist parties saw the democratic left as social fascists, or as a worse enemy than fascism. The anti-Stalinist left played a major role in the emergence of anti-fascism in this period. The Soviet leadership switched to a popular front policy in 1933, in which Communists were expected to work with liberal and even conservative allies to defend against an expected fascist assault. Although Communists and their fellow travellers in CP-dominated front organisations played a major role in the anti-fascist movement after 1933, Enzo Traverso and other historians have argued that the historiography has often obscured the role of the anti-Stalinist left: “it was possible to be both antifascist and anti-Stalinist, and... the fascination exercised by Stalinism at this time over the antifascist intelligentsia was not irresistible."

One of the most conflicts of the time was the Spanish Civil War. While the whole left fought alongside the Republican faction, within it there were sharp conflicts between the Communists, on the one hand, and anarchists, Trotskyists and the POUM (the Spanish affiliate of the International Revolutionary Marxist Centre) on the other. Support for the latter became a key issue for the anti-Stalinist left internationally, as exemplified by the ILP Contingent in the International Brigades, George Orwell's book Homage to Catalonia, the periodical Spain and the World, and various pamphlets by Emma Goldman, Rudolf Rocker and others.

Illustrating the role of the anti-Stalinist left in the anti-fascist movement, historian Jonathan Hyslop gives the example of the "Antwerp Group" of former Communist activists in the International Transport Workers' Federation, led by Hermann Knüfken. This group sent fighters to Spain, where they joined an international militia linked to the UGT union federation, but were expelled by the group’s Communst Party leader, Hans Beimler, over political differences, whereupon they joined the anarchist Durruti Column. Traverso gives the examples of socialists Gaetano Salvemini (who founded the first clandestine anti-fascist newspaper Non mollare ("Don't Give Up") in January 1925) and Carlo Rosselli (who founded the Giustizia e Libertà anti-fascist group and then fought in Spain as the leader, with Camillo Berneri of the Matteotti Battalion, a mixed volunteer unit of anarchist, liberal, socialist and Communist Italians).

In other countries too, non-Communist left parties competed with Stalinism as the same time as they fought the right. The Three Arrows symbol was adopted by the German Social Democrats to signify this multi-pronged conflict.

== Mid-century critiques (1939–1953) ==
Dissidents in the Trotskyist Socialist Workers Party, witnessing the collaboration of Joseph Stalin and Adolf Hitler in the invasion and the partition of Poland and the Soviet invasion of the Baltic states, argued that the Soviet Union had actually emerged as a new social formation, which was neither capitalist nor socialist. Adherents of that view, espoused most explicitly by Max Shachtman and closely following the writings of James Burnham and Bruno Rizzi, argued that the Soviet bureaucratic collectivist regime had in fact entered one of two great imperialist "camps" aiming to wage war to divide the world. The first of the imperialist camps, which Stalin and the Soviet Union were said to have joined as a directly participating ally, was headed by Nazi Germany and included most notably Fascist Italy. In that original analysis, the "second imperialist camp" was headed by England and France, actively supported by the United States.

Shachtman and his cothinkers argued for the establishment of a broad "third camp" to unite the workers and colonial peoples of the world in revolutionary struggle against the imperialism of the German–Soviet–Italian and the Anglo–American–French blocs. Shachtman concluded that the Soviet policy was one of imperialism and that the best result for the international working class would be the defeat of the Soviet Union in the course of its military incursions. Conversely, Trotsky argued that a defeat for the Soviet Union would strengthen capitalism and reduce the possibilities for political revolution.

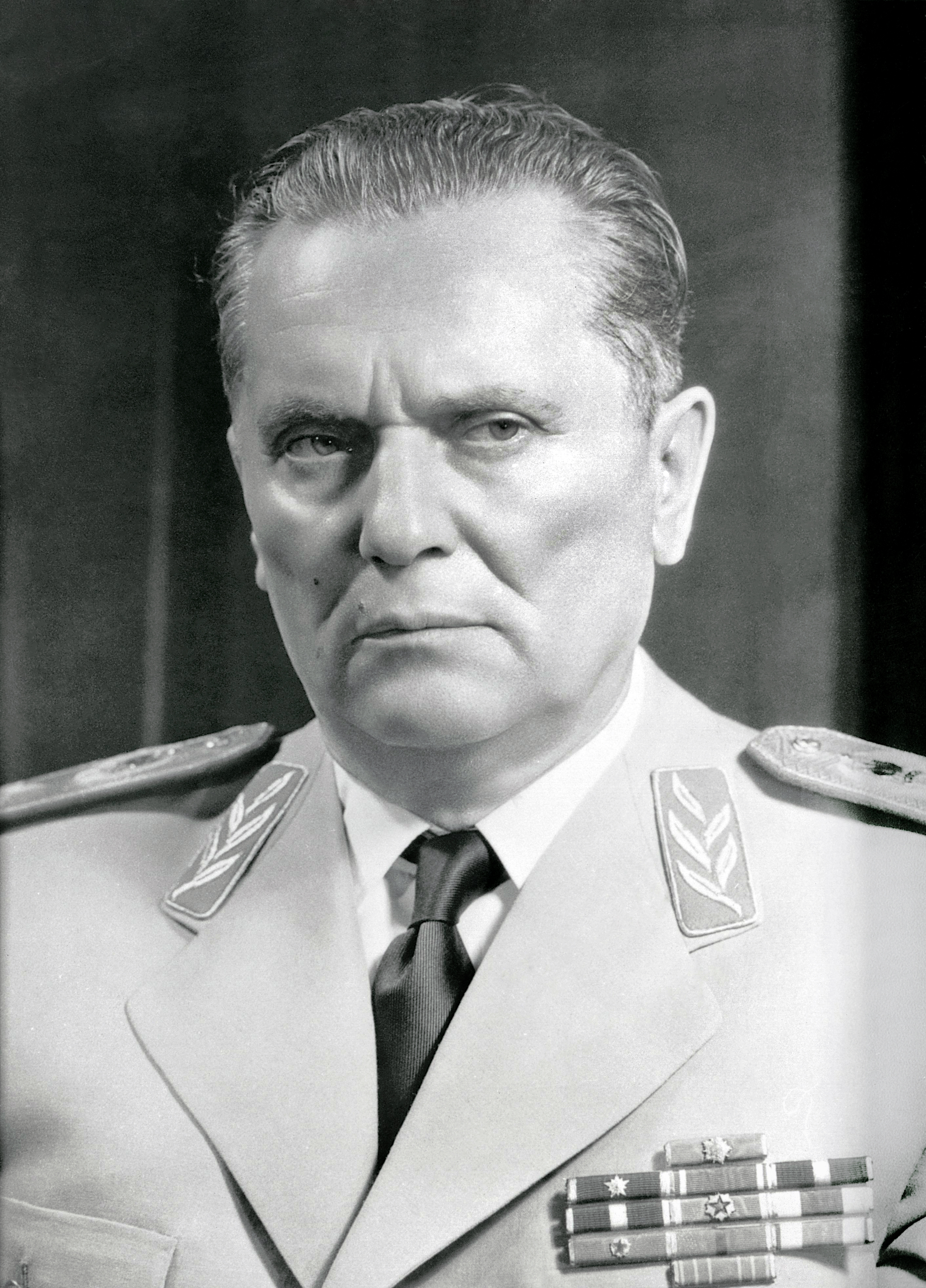
Tito was a heavy critic of Stalin after their split in 1948.

Josip Broz Tito became one of the most prominent leftist critics of Stalin after World War II. The Communist Party of Yugoslavia and the policies that were established was originally closely modeled on that of the Soviet Union. In the eyes of many, "Yugoslavia followed perfectly down the path of Soviet Marxism". At the start, Tito was even considered "Stalin's most faithful pupil". However, as the Yugoslavian Communist Party grew in size and power, it became a secondary Communist powerhouse in Europe. This eventually caused Tito to try to operate independently, which created tensions with Stalin and the Soviet Union. In 1948, the two leaders split apart because of Yugoslavian independent foreign policy and ideological differences.

Tito and his followers began a political effort to develop a new brand of socialism that would be both Marxist–Leninist in nature yet anti-Stalinist in practice. The result was the Yugoslav system of socialist workers' self-management. This led to the philosophy of organizing of every production-related activity in society into "self-managed units". This came to be known as Titoism. Tito was critical of Stalin because he believed Stalin became "un-Marxian". In the pamphlet titled "On New Roads to Socialism" one of Tito's high ranking aides states:

The indictment is long indeed: unequal relations with and exploitation of the other socialist countries, un-Marxian treatment of the role of the leader, inequality in pay greater than in bourgeois democracies, ideological promotion of Great Russian nationalism and subordination of other peoples, a policy of division of spheres of influence with the capitalist world, monopolization of the interpretation of Marxism, the abandonment of all democratic forms ...

Tito disagreed on the primary characteristics that defined Stalin's policy and style of leadership. Tito wanted to form his own version of "pure" socialism without many of the "un-Marxian" traits of Stalinism. Tito has also accused Stalinist USSR's hegemonic practices in Eastern Europe and economic exploitation of the Soviet satellite states as imperialist.

Other foreign leftist critics also came about during this time in Europe and America. Some of these critics include George Orwell, H. N. Brailsford, Fenner Brockway, the Young People's Socialist League, and later Michael Harrington, and the Independent Labour Party in Britain. There were also several anti-Stalinist socialists in France, including writers such as Simone Weil and Albert Camus as well as the group around Marceau Pivert.

In America, the New York Intellectuals around the journals New Leader, Partisan Review, and Dissent were among other critics. In general, these figures criticized Soviet Communism as a form of "totalitarianism which in some ways mirrored fascism". A key text for this movement was The God That Failed, edited by British socialist Richard Crossman in 1949, featuring contributions by Louis Fischer, André Gide, Arthur Koestler, Ignazio Silone, Stephen Spender and Richard Wright, about their journeys to anti-Stalinism.

== After the death of Stalin (1953–1967) ==
Following the death of Joseph Stalin, many prominent leaders of Stalin's cabinet sought to seize power. As a result, a Soviet triumvirate was formed between Lavrenty Beria, Georgy Malenkov, and Nikita Khrushchev. The primary goal of the new leadership was to ensure stability in the country while leadership positions within the government were sorted out. Some of the new policy implemented that was antithetical of Stalinism included policy that was free from terror, that decentralized power, and collectivized leadership. After this long power struggle within the Soviet government, Nikita Khrushchev came into power. Once in power, Khrushchev was quick to denounce Stalin and his methods of governance. In a secret speech delivered to the 20th party congress in 1956, Khrushchev was critical of the "cult of personality of Stalin" and his selfishness as a leader:

Comrades, the cult of the individual acquired such monstrous size chiefly because Stalin himself, using all conceivable methods, supported the glorification of his own person. This is supported by numerous facts.

Khrushchev also revealed to the congress the truth behind Stalin's methods of repression. In addition, he explained that Stalin had rounded up "thousands of people and sent them into a huge system of political work camps" called gulags. The truths revealed in this speech came to the surprise of many, but this fell into the plan of Khrushchev. This speech tainted Stalin's name which resulted in a significant loss of faith in his policy from government officials and citizens.

There were attempts within the Soviet Union's satellite states to find a left-wing path that departed from Moscow's directives, met with repression by Soviet-backed governments. In June 1956, the Polish Army violently repressed the workers' uprising at Poznań against the economic policies of the Polish People's Republic. The Hungarian Revolution of 1956 lasted fifteen days before being crushed by Soviet tanks. The repression in Hungary led to further disillusionment with Stalinism globally, and precipitated splits within and departures from Communist parties. In the UK, for example, historian E.P. Thompson, then a party member, later recalled many calling for an “organized movement of the Marxist anti-Stalinist left" outside the party. This was the catalyst for the emergence of the New Left.

During this period, known as the Khrushchev Thaw (1956–64), a dissident left emerged in the Soviet Union, including the Vail group in Leningrad (1956–58), who read texts by anarchists and the Workers Opposition and published “Theses on the Hungarian Revolution” and “The Truth About Hungary,” which emphasized the role of workers’ councils; and the Union of Communards in Leningrad (1960-1965), who wrote pamphlets such as “From the Dictatorship of the Bureaucracy to the Dictatorship of the Proletariat”, drawing on Lenin's State and Revolution to criticise Soviet bureaucracy. Mayakovsky Square in Moscow became a key meeting point for such groups from 1958.

During this Cold War era, the American non-Communist left (NCL) grew. The NCL was critical of the continuation of Stalinist Communism because of aspects such as famine and repression, and as later discovered, the covert intervention of Soviet state interests in the Communist Party USA (CPUSA). Members of the NCL were often ex-Communists, such as the historian Theodore Draper whose views shifted from socialism to liberalism, and socialists who became disillusioned with the Communist movement. Anti-Stalinist Trotskyists also wrote about their experiences during this time, such as Irving Howe and Lewis Coser. These perspectives inspired the creation of the Congress for Cultural Freedom (CCF), as well as international journals like Der Monat and Encounter; it also influenced existing publications such as the Partisan Review. According to John Earl Haynes and Harvey Klehr, the CCF was covertly funded by the Central Intelligence Agency (CIA) to support intellectuals with pro-democratic and anti-Communist stances. The Communist Party USA lost much of its influence in the first years of the Cold War due to the revelation of Stalinist crimes by Khrushchev. Although the Soviet Communist Party was no longer officially Stalinist, the Communist Party USA received a substantial subsidy from the USSR from 1959 until 1989, and consistently supported official Soviet policies such as intervention in Hungary and Czechoslovakia. The Soviet funding ended in 1989 when Gus Hall condemned the market initiatives of Mikhail Gorbachev.

From the late 1950s, several European socialist and Communist parties, such as in Denmark and Sweden, shifted away from orthodox Communism which they connected to Stalinism that was in recent history. Albert Camus criticized Soviet Communism, while many leftists saw the Soviet Union as emblematic of "state capitalism".

After Stalin's death and the Khrushchev Thaw, study and opposition to Stalinism became a part of historiography. The historian Moshe Lewin cautioned not to categorize the entire history of the Soviet Union as Stalinist, but also emphasized that Stalin's bureaucracy had permanently established "bureaucratic absolutism", resembling old monarchy, in the Soviet Union.

== Castroist critiques (1959–1968) ==
After Fidel Castro's visit to the United States in 1959, various American academics began publishing essays and books on the character of the Cuban Revolution and Fidel Castro. Some arguing that Castro was veering away from the goals of the Cuban Revolution, and towards Stalinism. Others argued that the criticisms of Castro were unwarranted. Throughout 1960, many articles were published in the socialist Monthly Review journal, arguing against any rumored "betrayal" of the Cuban Revolution. These articles were influenced by the writings of socialists Paul Sweezy and Leo Huberman, who visited Cuba in 1959.

In 1961, the historian Theodore Draper famously published in the anti-Stalinist Encounter magazine that Fidel Castro had betrayed the Cuban Revolution and could bring international war. The article was passed to John F. Kennedy, who considered it before approving the Bay of Pigs Invasion. According to Draper, the Cuban Revolution was a middle class movement for democracy. Castro, after coming to power, began pursuing a wave of land reforms in 1960 and 1961. During this time, Castro drifted away from his original democratic goals. Eventually, Castro heavily integrated Communist officials into his provisional government, and by Draper's conception, Castro had abandoned the democratic goals of the Cuban Revolution, and his own land reform plans of 1960–1961.

Draper considered his betrayal thesis to be a criticism of the accounts of socialists like Paul Sweezy and Leo Huberman who were sympathetic to Castro. Draper attempted to present a Marxist interpretation of Castroism, that made analogies to Trotskyist conceptions of Stalinism as a betrayer of the Russian Revolution.

Draper's work as a historian of the Cuban Revolution brought him to the attention of the Hoover Institution on War, Revolution, and Peace, an anti-Communist think tank located at Stanford University. Draper accepted a Hoover Institution fellowship and remained there until 1968, at which time he departed, ill at ease with the growing conservatism of the institution.

== Later developments (1968–present) ==
Anti-Stalinist leftists, influenced by Western Marxism, continued to organise in the Soviet Union. Roy Medvedev published the samizdat Political Diary to influence “party-democrats” in the hopes of reforming the regime. Elkon Gergieveich Leikin, a veteran of the anti-Stalinist oppositions of the 1920s, wrote The Origins of Stalinism, published by the French Trotskyist League of Revolutionary Communists in the early 1980s. In 1977, the Young Socialists formed at the Moscow State University, with Boris Kagarlitsky among its members. In the late 1980s, anti-Stalinist leftists formed Trotskyist and anarchist currents in the collapsing USSR.

The fall of the Soviet states briefly led to the revival of the anti-Stalinist left, as Traverso relates:

At the beginning we were euphoric: “the Berlin Wall is falling down, and this means a German Revolution is coming.” This was the view of Ernest Mandel, for instance: after many decades of passivity and exclusion, the German proletariat would suddenly return in the heart of Europe to accomplish a socialist revolution, which would be the convergence between an anti-capitalist revolution in the West and an anti-bureaucratic, anti-Stalinist revolution in Eastern Europe. Germany was considered the place where these revolutions could merge. Everybody was extremely enthusiastic. Trotskyists, who had always been anti-Stalinist, couldn't help but support this movement.

== Notable figures ==
- Leon Trotsky
- Emma Goldman
- Colette Audry
- Daniel Bell
- André Breton
- Albert Camus
- Milovan Djilas
- Daniel Guérin
- Sidney Hook
- Irving Howe
- CLR James
- Nikita Khrushchev
- Lucien Laurat
- Claude Lefort
- Marcel Martinet
- Dwight MacDonald
- Mary McCarthy
- Claude McKay
- Maurice Merleau-Ponty
- Mikhail Gorbachev
- Maurice Nadeau
- Pierre Naville
- New York Intellectuals
- New Philosophers
- George Orwell
- Benjamin Péret
- Henry Poulaille
- David Rousset
- Jean-Paul Sartre
- Josip Broz Tito
- Victor Serge
- Ota Šik
- I. F. Stone
- Imre Nagy
- Władysław Gomułka
- Carlo Tresca

== See also ==
- Anti-Leninism
  - Anti-communism § Left-wing anti-communism
- De-Stalinization
- Eurocommunism
- Fourth International
- Harvill Secker
- Joseph Stalin's cult of personality
- Jewish Anti-Fascist Committee
- Korets–Landau leaflet
- Left Opposition
- Left-wing uprisings against the Bolsheviks
- Lenin's testament
- Liberal hawk
- Libertarian socialism
- Neo-Stalinism
- New Left
- Non-conformists of the 1930s
- Red fascism
- Socialist democracy
- Tankie – pejorative term used by anti-authoritarian socialists
- The God That Failed
- The Stalinist Legacy
- The Stalin School of Falsification
- United Opposition (Soviet Union)
