= Ryutin affair =

1932 attempt to oppose Stalin within the CPSU

Union of Marxist-Leninists Союз марксистов-ленинцев
- Leader: Martemyan Ryutin
- Founded: March 1932
- Dissolved: October 1932
- Split from: Right Opposition
- Merged into: Bloc of Soviet Oppositions
- Ideology: Leninism; Agrarian socialism Anti-collectivization
- Political position: Left wing to far-left
- National affiliation: Communist Party of the Soviet Union

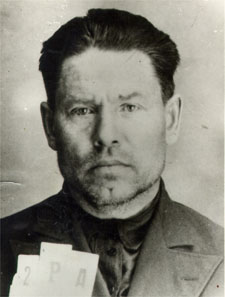
Ryutin Martemyan Nikitich

The Ryutin affair was an attempt led by Martemyan Ryutin to remove Joseph Stalin as General Secretary of the All-Union Communist Party (b) (CPSU) in 1932.

Ryutin wrote two publications that were highly critical of Stalin, his authoritarianism, and his first five-year plan. Ryutin established a Right Opposition faction within the CPSU known as the Union of Marxist-Leninists which opposed Stalin's rule and Stalinism in favour of a moderate form of Leninism. Ryutin and his supporters were defeated by a hardline Stalinist faction in the Central Control Commission, arrested by the OGPU as counterrevolutionaries, and later executed in the Great Purge.

Ryutin's movement was one of the last attempts to oppose Stalin from within the CPSU and marked a general decline of the Right Opposition.

== Background ==
Martemyan Ryutin was an Old Bolshevik and a secretary of the Moscow branch of the All-Union Communist Party (CPSU) in the 1920s. From December 1927 to September 1930, Ryutin was a candidate (non-voting) member of the Central Committee of the Communist Party of the Soviet Union, and a supporter of the moderate ("Rightist") wing within the party led by the communist theoretician Nikolai Bukharin and Chairman of the Council of People's Commissars Alexei Rykov. The Rightists were opposed to the dominant Stalinist wing of the CPSU led by General Secretary Joseph Stalin. Bukharin and Rykov were defeated and demoted by Stalin from 1928 to 1930, leading to Ryutin being demoted as well. In September 1930, he was expelled from the CPSU, then six weeks later he was arrested for oppositionist views. On 17 January 1931, he was released and allowed to re-join the party, but remained silently opposed to regime of Stalin.

By the beginning of the 1930s, Stalin was firmly in control of the CPSU and all dissent was punishable by immediate expulsion and exile. Opposition to the Stalinist course strengthened within the CPSU against the backdrop of forced collectivization, the Soviet famine of 1932–33, and mass deportations. These events led to anti-Stalin opposition to reappear, such as the underground organization of Ivan Smirnov and a group formed by Georgy Safarov and Nikolai Uglanov. Even new illegal entities started appearing, such as the "Left-Right bloc" formed by Sergey Syrtsov and Vissarion Lominadze, and another formed by Aleksandr Petrovich Smirnov, Nikolai Borisovich Eismont and Vladimir Tolmachyov.

== The Union of Marxist-Leninists ==
In June 1932, Ryutin wrote a pamphlet entitled Appeal to All Members of the All-Union Communist Party (Bolsheviks) and a nearly 200-page document entitled Stalin and the Crisis of the Proletarian Dictatorship (more commonly known as "Ryutin's Platform"). In these documents, Ryutin called for an end to forced collectivization ("peace with the peasants"), a slowing down of the industrialization programme in the Soviet Union, the reinstatement of all previously expelled Party members on the left and on the right (including Leon Trotsky), and a "fresh start".

Four of the Platform's thirteen chapters examined the character of Stalin, whom Ryutin called "the evil genius of the Party and the revolution". Ryutin's Appeal was even more inflammatory, arguing Stalin "must be removed by force" and urging its readers "to everywhere organize cells of the 'Union' to be joined under the banner of Leninism for the liquidation of the Stalin dictatorship." Ryutin gathered around him a group of like-minded friends who called themselves "The Union of Marxist-Leninists". They began to distribute the Appeal to workers and to members of the opposition in the summer and early autumn of 1932. Bukharin's former comrades, the "Red Professors" - Alexander Slepkov, Dmitri Maretsky, and Jan Sten - helped to distribute the manifestos. Sten gave copies to Lev Kamenev and to Grigory Zinoviev, while Slepkov provided the documents to a group of Trotskyists in Kharkov. Nearly all of the former leaders of the "Right Opposition" - Mikhail Tomsky, Nikolai Uglanov, and Rykov - saw the Appeal. Benyamin Kayurov also aligned himself with the group. An informer soon betrayed the Union to the OGPU (the Soviet secret police) and to Stalin. On 23 September 1932, Ryutin was arrested along with other suspects.

On 27 September, the Presidium of the Central Control Commission hastily convened to investigate and deal with the Ryutin group. Twenty-four members attended, including Yan Rudzutak, Yemelyan Yaroslavsky, Avel Yenukidze, Aaron Soltz, and Lenin's sister, Maria Ilyinichna Ulyanova. They authorized the OGPU "to uncover the still undetected members of Ryutin's counterrevolutionary group" and to acquaint "these white guard criminals...with the entire strictness of revolutionary law". The final report of the Presidium, released on 9 October, expelled twenty-four people from the CPSU and banished them from Moscow for varying lengths of time. The members of the Union were characterized as "degenerate elements who have become the enemies of communism and of Soviet power, as traitors to the party and the working class, who have tried to form an underground bourgeois-kulak organization under a fake 'Marxist-Leninist' banner for the purpose of restoring capitalism in general and kulakdom in particular in the USSR". The OGPU referred the matter of Ryutin's fate to the ruling Politburo.

== Historical analysis ==
A stenographic record of this Politburo meeting has not been located. A number of historians, led by Robert Conquest, have adopted the argument first advanced by Boris Nicolaevsky in "The Letter of an Old Bolshevik" (1936), that a division existed in the Politburo between moderates and hardliners. Stalin argued that Ryutin deserved the death penalty, because his Appeal could inspire its readers to acts of terrorism and a palace coup. A moderate bloc of Politburo members opposed Stalin, because they were unwilling to violate Lenin's stricture against the spilling of Bolshevik blood. Sergei Kirov supposedly spoke with "particular force against the recourse to the death penalty" and was joined to a greater or lesser extent by Sergo Ordzhonikidze, Valerian Kuibyshev, Stanislav Kosior, and Yan Rudzutak, while Stalin's position was supported only by Lazar Kaganovich. According to historian J. Arch Getty, Nicolaevsky's story is a "persistent myth." He points to an incident from eighteen months before when the Politburo voted for a very harsh penalty for the opposition and Stalin moderated the punishment. It is known that Ryutin received the harshest penalty. He was sentenced to ten years imprisonment.

Former United Opposition leaders Grigory Zinoviev and Lev Kamenev, who had read the Platform, were also expelled from the CPSU in October 1932 and exiled to the Urals region for failure to report the incident to the secret police. Pierre Broué theorized that the Ryutin group was part of a larger anti-Stalin bloc formed in 1932, of which Trotsky and Smirnov were members and which was potentially in contact with Zinoviev and Kamenev around the time of their 1932 expulsion. Some of Trotsky's letters mention that some "rightists" were members of the bloc, none of which were named. As Ryutin and his allies were the only rightist group opposing Stalin at the time, they are the most likely to be those who Trotsky was mentioning. The bloc most likely dissolved in early 1933, when Ryutin and Smirnov were arrested.

Ryutin was eventually executed on 10 January 1937, during the Great Purge, which also claimed the lives of Bukharin, Zinoviev, Kamenev, Kosior, Rudzutak, Uglanov, Yenukidze, Rykov and most of the rest of the Old Bolsheviks.
