= Bloc of Soviet Oppositions =

Political alliance of Soviet communists against Joseph Stalin

- Leader: Leon Trotsky; Lev Sedov
- Founded: 1932
- Dissolved: 1933
- Merger of: Left Opposition; Right Opposition; Left–Right Bloc; Union of Marxist-Leninists
- Preceded by: United Opposition
- Ideology: Communism; Anti-Stalinism: Trotskyism; Marxism; Leninism
- Political position: Far-left

The Bloc of Oppositions, also known as Trotsky's bloc and called by the Soviet press the Bloc of Rights and Trotskyites, was a political alliance created by oppositionists in the USSR and Leon Trotsky by the end of 1932. It was a secret organization to fight Stalinist repression in the Soviet Union.

== Background ==
The various open opposition groups that had tried to oppose Stalin in the Communist Party had failed, and their former members barely had any power. The former leader of the Left Opposition Leon Trotsky was deported from the Soviet Union, Lev Kamenev and Grigori Zinoviev were expelled from the party, and the Rights were sidelined. With growing opposition to Joseph Stalin and his collectivization policies, some Bolsheviks decided to form underground opposition groups against him and the party leadership. The bloc was a loose alliance between many of them.

== Underground Oppositions and the Bloc's formation ==
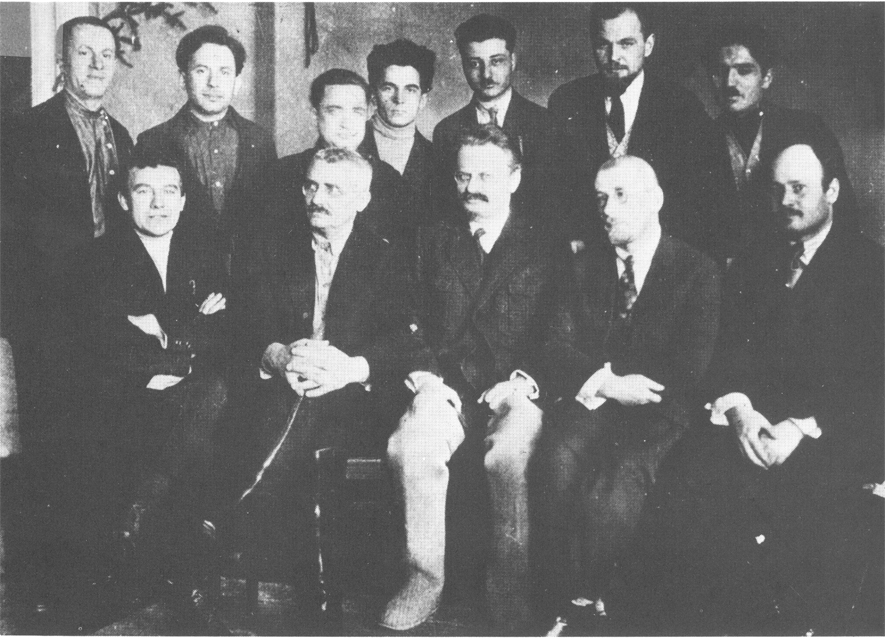
Members of the Left Opposition in 1927. Ivan Smirnov (left of Trotsky) and some others would later participate in the Bloc.

By the end of 1932, Leon Trotsky and his son Sedov were having contact with the underground opposition inside the USSR. Many non-Trotskyist opposition groups were discontented with the regime and the party leadership at the time. This led to the formation of a "bloc" between them. It was not a fusion of ideologies, in fact, Trotsky feared that other fractions of the bloc would gain much power:

The proposal for a bloc seems to me to be completely acceptable. I must make quite clear that we are dealing with a bloc and not a fusion. (...)

My proposed declaration is evidently intended for our fraction of the Left Opposition in the strict sense of the term (and not for our new allies). The opinion of the allies, according to which we should wait for the rightwingers to involve themselves more deeply, does not have my agreement, as far as our fraction is concerned. One fights repression by means of anonymity and conspiracy, not by silence. Loss of time is impermissible: from the political point of view, that would amount to leaving the field to the right-wingers. (...)

The bloc does not exclude mutual criticism. Any propaganda by the allies on behalf of the capitulators (Grünstein, etc.) will be inexorably, mercilessly resisted by us.

=== Member groups of the Bloc ===
Three groups joined the political agreement that founded the Bloc: the Trotskyists in the USSR, the Zinovievists and the organization of Jan Sten and Vissarion Lominadze.

==== The Trotskyist group ====
In Sedov and Trotsky's letters they are only referred to as 'our group'. Not much is known about its members at the time, other than the fact that Andrei Konstantinov and Ivan Smirnov were some of its leaders. Smirnov, a former member of the Left Opposition led the group at the time, which was taken down by Soviet Authorities in late 1932. After the end of the group, Sedov remarked that "the ties with the workers have been preserved."

==== The Zinovievists ====
Zinovievist was term applied to those who followed the views of Grigori Zinoviev and Lev Kamenev, who had themselves publicly repudiated opposition activity. Trotsky's letters do not make it clear how many or who of their followers joined.

==== Sten–Lominadze group ====
There is little information about this organization. Jan Sten and Lominadze are generally accepted to have led two opposition groups in the past: the “Sten–Chatzin” group and the Syrtsov–Lominadze group, called by some "the Left-Right bloc" to oppose Stalin's policy of collectivization. Lominadze and Sten were also associated with the oppositional resolution of the Party Committee in Transcaucasia, by the Trotskyist Bulletin of the Opposition.

=== Opposition groups outside of the Bloc ===
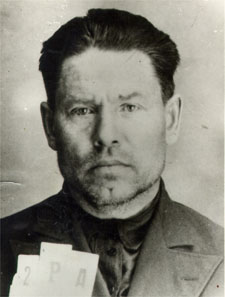
Martemyan Ryutin, one of the leaders of the Rightist Underground Opposition.

==== The Rightist group ====
Rightist was a term used in the USSR to define those who followed Nikolai Bukharin's pro-NEP stance. In Trotsky's letters, it was stated that the "rightists" were an opposition group at the time, none of which were named. Trotskyist historian Pierre Broué stated that there was no evidence that Bukharin or his close allies like Rykov or Tomsky were participating in any opposition at the time. The term was most likely referring to the Ryutin group, an oppositionist group in the Soviet Union which supported Bukharin's economic views, but criticized him for capitulating to Stalin. Their platform openly called for "the liquidation of the dictatorship of Stalin and his clique" and also advocated for the return of all expelled party members, including Trotsky.

==== The Liberals ====
The liberals were a group who were having contact with Trotsky at the time. One remark by Trotsky shows they were extremely important allies:

“Even in a modest way, they have given us more than anyone on a ‘practical’ line, to be sure, and not politically.”

Other letters do not explain what the "liberals" had given to the Trotskyists, nor who any of their members were. Broué suggests they were moderate bureaucrats who were led by Sergei Kirov, because of his alleged moderate position against Stalin. J. Arch Getty argues that Kirov was no moderate. He points to the claims of Grigori Tokaev, who was a member of the underground opposition, who said Kirov ruthlessly repressed the opposition and was 'the first executioner'. Trotsky himself called Kirov 'an unscrupulous dictator'. Getty also mentioned that in Kirov's speeches, he ridiculed the opposition and even questioned their humanity. No historian who analysed the bloc has concluded with certainty who 'the liberals' were.

==== Eismont-Tolmachev group ====
Shortly after the Ryutin trial, the Central Committee questioned the Eismont-Tolmachev group, which included N.B. Eismont, People's Commissar of Supply for the Russian Republic, and his friend N.V. Tolmachev, who oversaw road transportation in the republic. In November 1932, the chief of Moscow's Communist Academy reported Eismont to Stalin, alleging that he asked a friend to join a group like Ryutin's and called for the removal of Stalin. Central Committee members Emelian Iaroslavskii, Ian Rudzutak, and Pavel Postyshev questioned Eismont based on the allegations, which they saw as his advocation to assassinate Stalin. Eismont admitted to being critical of Stalin but denied calling for his removal, however the committee decided to expel him from the party and then arrest him. Eismont, Tolmachev, and another member of the group each received three years confinement.

==== Other groups ====
Trotsky also mentioned other groups in his correspondence including the Safar(ov)–Tarkhan group.

== Historical analysis ==
In the Moscow trials, the defendants were found guilty of conspiring against Stalin, of having formed a conspiratorial bloc and collaborated with foreign governments. When it was discovered that Trotsky had indeed formed a "bloc" with the opposition in the USSR, like the Soviet government claimed, it put the Trials in a new light. Most historians at the time believed that they were nothing but a campaign to destroy anyone in the party who disagreed with Stalin, but it was clear that it was based on this bloc, albeit exaggeratedly. Trotsky's letters did not contain any evidence of collaboration with foreign powers nor that Trotsky approved of a 'terrorist policy'. Broué concluded the bloc ceased to exist by early 1933, because some of its members, like I.N. Smirnov, Ryutin and the leaders of the Eismont group were arrested and Zinoviev and Kamenev had re-joined the party. Broué later noted that, even imprisoned, several opposition members continued participating in an underground Trotskyist group. In early 2018, some documents belonging to this group were discovered by the Russian Federal Prison service in the Verkhne-Uralsk isolator, where certain opposition leaders, like Alexander Slepkov were imprisoned.

Many things are still unknown about the bloc. Mainly because some letters in the Trotsky Letter Archives were missing. The ones that were left had some words 'carefully erased' and one was cut with scissors. Broué and Getty concluded that the missing letters were most likely removed or destroyed.
