= Chinese Eastern Railway electoral district =

Constituency of the Russian Republic

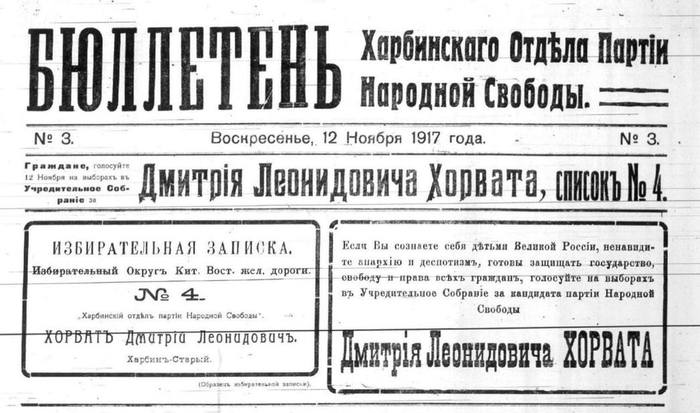
Bulletin issued by the Kadet Party branch in Harbin, campaigning for its candidate D. Horvath for the Chinese Eastern Railway seat

The Chinese Eastern Railway electoral district (Russian: округ Китайской Восточной железной дороги) was a constituency created for the 1917 Russian Constituent Assembly election. The Chinese Eastern Railroad electoral district was located outside the borders of Russia.

In March 1917, in response to the abdication of the Tsar, Lieutenant General Dmitry Horvat (the Chinese Eastern Railroad Zone administrator since 1902) proclaimed an 'All Russian Provisional Government' based in Harbin. However, Horvath's regime was soon challenged by emergence of soviet power in the Chinese Eastern Railroad Zone (to the dismay of Western powers). Nevertheless, Harbin was far detached from events in Petrograd and a more liberal atmosphere prevailed in Russian politics there; foreign diplomats took note that the monarchist Horvath and the Bolshevik leader Martemyan Ryutin could meet for lunch at the Railway Club in Harbin.

Four candidates were nominated for the Chinese Eastern Railroad seat; Horvath ran as the Kadet candidate, representing the pre-revolutionary status quo. Nikolai Strelkov of the Railwaymens' Union contested as the Menshevik candidate, the Jewish businessman and Chair of the Chinese Eastern Railroad Executive Committee Faytel Volfovich was the SR candidate and the ensign and Harbin Soviet chairman Ryutin the Bolshevik candidate.

The vote was held for the Chinese Eastern Railroad seat on November 29, 1917. The voter turnout stood at around 60%.

According to a contemporary account published in the organ of the Nikolsk-Ussuriysky Soviet (whose totals differ somewhat from the figures of Radkey), the vote in Harbin was won by Strelkov (4,874 votes, 31.74%), followed by Horvath (4,450 votes, 28.98%), Ryutin (4,412 votes, 28.73%) and Volfovich (1,620 votes, 10.55%). In the 26 precincts of the western line, Ryutin was the most vote candidate (5,991 votes, 38.25%), followed by Strelkov (5,845 votes, 37.32%), Volfovich (2,519 votes, 16.08%) and Horvath (1,307 votes, 8.35%). In the four precincts of the eastern line, Ryutin emerged as the winner with 1,461 votes (39.84%), followed by Strelkov (1,187 votes, 32.37%), Volfovich (831 votes, 22.66%) and Horvath (188 votes, 5.13%).

== Results ==
Chinese Eastern Railroad
Party	Vote	%	Seats
List 2 - Mensheviks	13,139	37.37	1
List 3 - Bolsheviks	10,612	30.18	
List 4 - Kadets	6,327	18.00	
List 1 - Socialist-Revolutionaries	5,081	14.45	
Total:'	35,159		1

Deputies Elected
Strelkov	Menshevik
