= Syrtsov–Lominadze Affair =

Attempt to oppose Joseph Stalin's consolidation of power among Soviet communists

Left–Right Bloc
- Leader (left): Vissarion Lominadze
- Leader (right): Sergey Syrtsov
- Founded: July 1930
- Dissolved: December 1930
- Merger of: Rightists; Leftists
- Preceded by: United Opposition
- Merged into: Bloc of Soviet Oppositions
- Ideology: Anti-collectivism
- National affiliation: Communist Party of the Soviet Union

In the history of the Communist Party of the Soviet Union the Left–Right Bloc (Russian: лево-правый блок, romanized: levo-pravyy blok) was a failed attempt at vocal opposition to Joseph Stalin's politics of forced collectivization. Vissarion Lominadze and Sergey Syrtsov were recognized as its leaders. The name is derived from the accusation of factionism towards the group, created by the joining of two groups: one accused of "right opportunism" and allegedly headed by Syrtsov, and another one accused of "leftism" and "half-Trotskyism" allegedly headed by Lominadze. In Western literature the case is known as the Syrtsov–Lominadze Affair.

== History ==
The issue was part on the agenda of the November 4, 1930 joint session of the Bureau of the Moscow Committee of the RKP(b) and the Presidium of the Central Control Commission which considered the issue, "On the Factional Work of Comrades Syrtsov, Lominadze, Shatskin and Others." The resolution of the session declared, in part, that Syrtsov had "organized an underground factional center which included Nusinov, Kavraiskii, Galperin, Kurs, and others" and that Lominadze had "headed a persevered fractional group which included Shatskin, Reznik, and others."

There are opinions that in fact there was no such bloc; that while the dissenting views were indeed public, the whole affair was fabricated. For example, Roy Medvedev expressed an opinion that Stalin learned some details of a conversation between Syrtsov and Lominadze. Pierre Broué, on the other hand, wrote that Medvedev was wrong and there was indeed a bloc, because some of Trotsky's letters mentioned a real oppositional group between Lominadze, Jan Sten and Syrtsov.

Robert Davies notes that the case was part of the overall 1930 campaign against dissent (actual or potential) within the party. Davies also notes a peculiarity that unlike many other cases of Soviet political suppression, the campaign against Syrtsov and Lominadze in press did not associate them with "wreckers", nor with "imperialist forces" abroad.

Some of its members later joined the Bloc of Soviet Oppositions with Leon Trotsky and other anti-Stalin politicians in 1932.
