= Grete Wilde =

German politician

- Born: 12 May 1904; Berlin, Germany
- Died: 1943/44 ? Karaganda, USSR
- Occupations: Political activist Comintern instructor/officer
- Known for: her arrest and punishment during the Great purge
- Political party: KPD
- Children: Klaus Wilde

Grete Wilde (12 May 1904 – ca. 1943) was a German Communist activist who moved to Moscow in the 1930s and fell victim to Stalin's purges. She was sentenced to eight years in labour camp detention in 1937 and deported to Karaganda, where she is believed to have died during 1943/44.

== Biography ==
Grete Wilde was born in Berlin into a family of butchers. She herself received a commercial education and embarked on a career of office work. She joined the Young Socialists in January 1919. She joined the recently launched Communist Party in 1921. She was a Communist youth leader in a district of Berlin till March 1922. That was when she joined the regional leadership team (Bezirksleitung) for the Young Communists for Berlin-Brandenburg. In Autumn 1923 she became secretary for the Berlin-Brandenburg Young Communists. Between 1924 and 1926 Grete Wilde represented Berlin in the secretariat of the Young Communist League Central Committee.

She travelled to Moscow in 1927. Till 1930 she was a student at the International Lenin School. After that she became an instructor in the Cadre Department of the Communist International ("Comintern"). In 1931 she was posted to Vienna where she worked under Wilhelm Knorin as a Central Committee instructor with the Austrian Communist Party. Later she moved to Turkey where she undertook similar party work. In Ankara she became a close friend of the poet Nâzım Hikmet and his young son. However, she was arrested and in December 1932 sentenced to a four-year prison term for "Communist activities".

An amnesty enabled Wilde to return to the Soviet Union. She was given the party name "Erna Martens", and from 1935 worked in the Comintern's Cadre department in Moscow: her duties included gathering information on so-called "pests" ("Schädlinge") in the cadres. In Ankara she lived with Resat Fuat Baraner (1900–1968), a Turkish communist and Comintern representative. Their son Klaus was born in Moscow on 19 July 1935. Wilde and her colleague Georg Brückmann were closely involved in the "Great Purge". A large number of political exiles from Nazi Germany sought refuge in Moscow during the mid-1930s and there were concerns on the part of the leadership that these might include people who dabbled with the thought that Leon Trotsky might have made a better successor to Lenin than Joseph Stalin. Walde and Brückmann undertook verification checks on many of the German political exiles. They became directly involved with the Münzenberg Trust ("Apparat"). In the summer of 1937 Grete Wilde herself fell victim to the purges sweeping through the German expatriate community in Moscow. On 4 August 1937 she was excluded from the party group cadre, condemned for "[1] taking part in the faction struggle of the Ruth Fischer Maslow Group against the party leadership in 1923, [2] associating with elements hostile to the party and to the Soviet Union such as Schatzkin, Lominadse and Vujovic, [3] unprincipled opposition to the leadership of the Lenin School in 1928, [4] leading a group struggle against the Austrian Communist Party in 1931 and [5] incriminating a Turkish Party comrade to the Turkish Police". (Note: "... [1] taking part in the faction struggle of the Ruth Fischer Maslow Group against the party leadership in 1923, [2] associating with elements hostile to the party and to the Soviet Union such as Schatzkin, Lominadse and Vujovic, [3] unprincipled opposition to the leadership of the Lenin School in 1928, [4] leading a group struggle against the Austrian Communist Party in 1931 and [5] incriminating a Turkish Party comrade to the Turkish Police." " ... [1] Teilnahme am Fraktionskampf der Ruth-Fischer-Maslow-Gruppe gegen die Parteiführung der KPD im Jahre 1923, [2] Verbindung mit partei- und sowjetfeindlichen Elementen wie Schatzkin, Lominadse, Vujovic, [3] prinzipienloser Kampf gegen die Leitung der Leninschule im Jahre 1928, [4] Führung eines Gruppenkampfes gegen die Parteiführung der KPÖ im Jahre 1931 und [5] Belastung eines türkischen Parteigenossen vor der türkischen Polizei.")

Grete Wilde was arrested by the NKVD in Moscow on 5 October 1937. She faced a special tribunal "on account of membership of the right wing Trotskyite anto-Comintern organisation within the Comintern structure". She was sentenced to eight years in a labour camp and immediately deported to deported to Karaganda, where she is believed to have died during 1943/44.

== Klaus ==
Grete Wilde's elder brother, Arthur Wilde (1902–1958), was also a party activist. He emigrated in January 1934, working abroad under the party name "Franz Rotter" for the Internal Relations department of the Comintern and for Soviet Intelligence. He was active in China during 1934, and in Prague between 1935 and 1937. He returned to Moscow in October 1937, staying with the Comintern till 1939 when he took a teaching post at the Institute for Foreign Languages in Moscow. Later he became an instructor at an Antifascist School at Ogre in the Latvian SSR. He was permitted to return to Germany in April 1955. He arrived back with his wife and with his adoptive son, Klaus, his sister's son.
