= Patriarch Ponds =

Park, pond and residential area in Moscow, Russia

Coordinates: 55.763883°N 37.592120°E

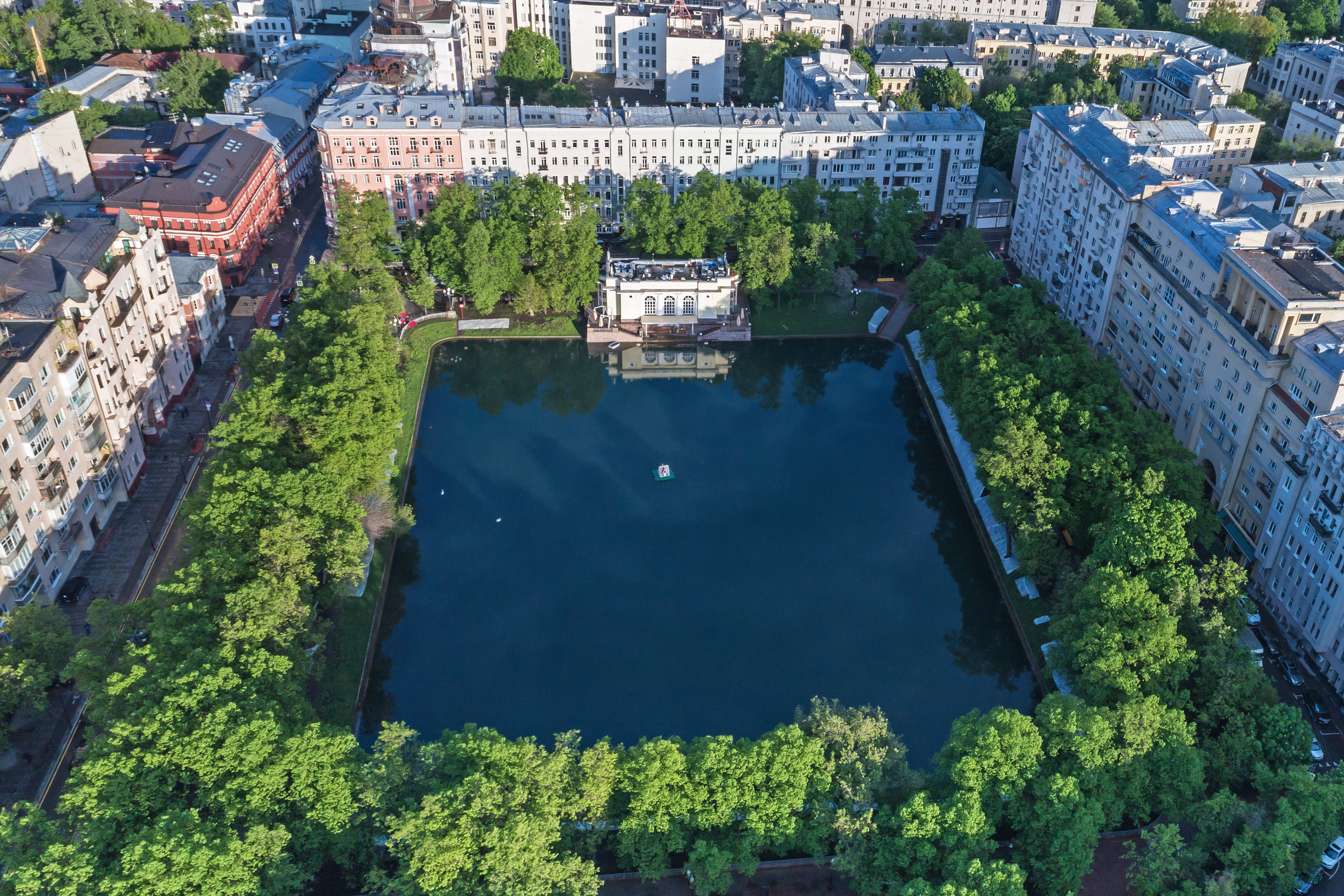
Patriarshiy Pond, aerial view

Patriarch's Ponds (Russian: Патриаршие пруды, romanized: Patriarshiye prudy) is a park, pond and an affluent residential area in downtown Presnensky District of Moscow, Russia. For the last 200 years, there has been only one pond, although, as the name of Tryokhprudny Pereulok (Трёхпрудный переулок, lit. Three-Pond Lane) suggests, there used to be more. The area of the existing pond is 9,900 square metres (107,000 sq ft); the depth is about two meters.

The Ponds area is accessible via the Moscow Metro Mayakovskaya (eastern exit) and Pushkinskaya stations.

== History ==
=== Origin ===
The area is named after the seventeenth century Patriarch's Sloboda (Патриаршая слобода) located on the Goat Marsh (Козье болото). This marsh was once connected by a brook to the Presnya River west; by 1739, when the first topographic map was compiled, the brook disappeared and the marsh separated from Presnya. People considered the swamp as an anomalous zone; apparently this caused a proverb "Фома поспешил, да людей насмешил – увяз на Патриарших" ("Thomas has hastened, but made people laugh - he got stuck in Patriarshy").

=== 19th century ===
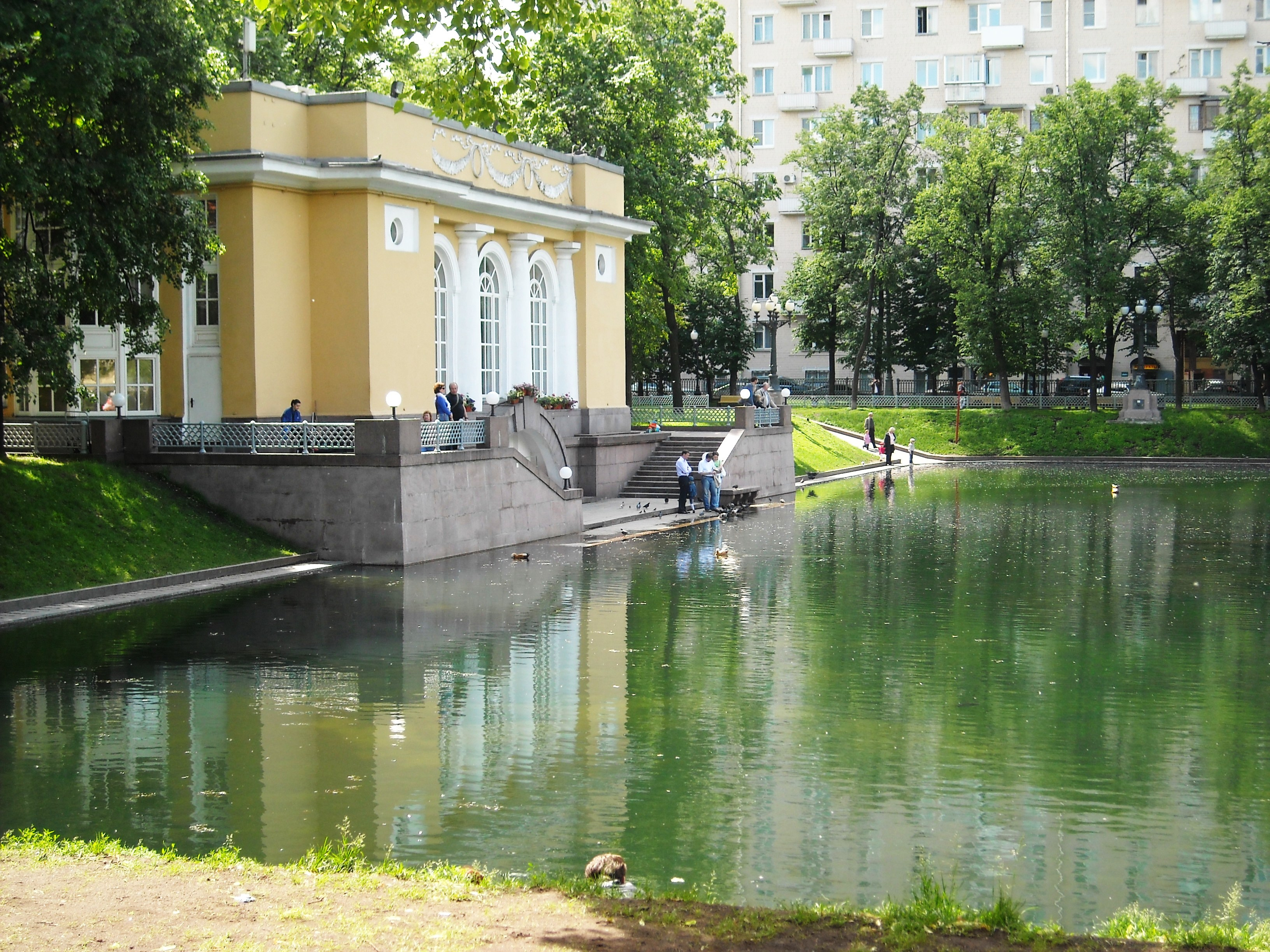
Patriarch Ponds, Skating Ring Building in Spring

The pond acquired its present shape and was cleaned up in 1830–31, a part of a plan to rebuild Moscow after the Fire of 1812. The buildings around the pond were wooden; stone construction proceeded slowly through the second half of the nineteenth century. In winters, the Russian Gymnastic Society operated a skating rink on the frozen pond.

At the turn of the century, cheap rental buildings around the pond were occupied by the University students. During the December 1905, the area was held by left-wing student militia and became a war zone. The Ponds also housed Moscow's first hospital for children (the Filatov Hospital, which later relocated to nearby Garden Ring).

=== Soviet history ===
After the revolution, the spacious apartments in buildings occupied by wealthy merchants were converted to communal apartments with shared kitchens.

The author Mikhail Bulgakov and his wife Yelena Shilovskaya lived in this area in the 1930s.

From the later 1930s to the 1950s, the lowrise buildings were torn down. The two most important Soviet-era buildings constructed were The House of Lions, a luxurious residence for Red Army Marshals (1945, designed by Zholtovsky workshop) and the 1935 Aviazhilstroy Apartments, a yellow postconstructivist high-rise by Vladimir Vladimirov (the building, conceived by Panteleimon Golosov, was completed in part. See original design). The boathouse on the ponds was built in wood in 1946. It was not until the 1980s that it was rebuilt in stone.

=== Modern history ===
In 2000–2002, the controversial Patriarch Apartments were built (design by Sergei Tkachenko); this 13-story building, crowned with a 1/50 scale model of Tatlin's Tower is also known as Alla Pugacheva's home.

As of 2016 the neighborhood had become gentrified. Owners of the communal apartments had been bought out and the apartments reconverted into luxury residences. Fashionable shops, restaurants and bars serve crowds. The area is so popular that the upscale residents of the neighborhood complain.

== Bulgakov legacy ==
The Pond is one of the main settings of Mikhail Bulgakov's novel The Master and Margarita. Monuments to Bulgakov and to Ivan Krylov have been erected near the pond. The Master and Margarita begins with a tram accident by the pond. Although there was never any regular tram service or permanent tram tracks around the pond, for a short time in 1930s, there was a temporary service track used for night storage.

== Gallery ==
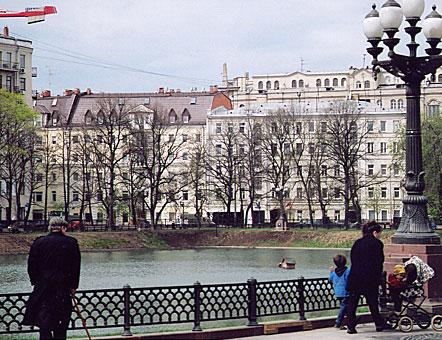
Houses and the pond.

The pond

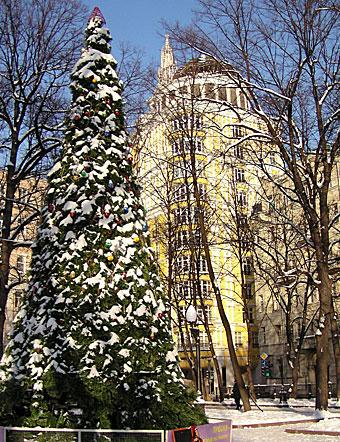
Patriarshiye Ponds in winter
