= Nikolai Strelkov =

Russian politician

Nikolai Arsenevich Strelkov (Russian: Николай Арсеньевич Стрелков) was a Russian Social Democratic (Menshevik) politician. He was born in 1879. Strelkov hailed from a noble family, his father being a State Councillor.

Strelkov graduated from the Morshansk Real School in 1898. He became involved in the Social Democratic movement around this time. He went on to study at the Nowa Aleksandria Institute of Agriculture and Forestry. He was expelled from the Institute in 1900 and 1901. When the Russian Social Democratic Labour Party split in 1903 he sided with the Menshevik faction. He represented Saratov at the 5th Congress of the Russian Social Democratic Labour Party held in London in 1907. In 1913 he finally obtained his academic degree, graduating from the Department of History and Philosophy of Moscow University. He also studied in Berlin.

At the time of the 1917 Russian Revolution Strelkov worked as assistant editor of the official journal of the Chinese Eastern Railway. He was also a leader of the Railwaymens' Union at the Chinese Eastern Railway. Strelkov contested the 1917 Russian Constituent Assembly election as the Menshevik candidate for the Chinese Eastern Railway seat. Strelkov emerged victorious, winning the plurality of votes cast in Harbin and finishing in second place in the precincts of the western line and the eastern line (where the Bolshevik Ryutin was the most voted candidate). Per the account of Oliver Henry Radkey, Strelkov obtained 13,139 votes (37.37%). He attended the sole session of the All-Russian Constituent Assembly held on January 5, 1918.

As of 1919 he served as the editor of Vestnik Manchurii, a daily newspaper. He worked as a literature teacher at the Harbin Commercial College and the Harbin Gymnasium (of the YMCA) in the 1920s. The latter institution had been opened by YMCA in Harbin in 1925, following the Russian pre-revolution curriculum.
