= Schroll =

Schroll is a surname. Notable people with the name include:

- Al Schroll (1932–1999), American baseball pitcher
- Bill Schroll (1926–2009), American football linebacker
- Hannes Schroll (1909–1985), Austrian Alpine ski racer
- Savannah Schroll Guz (born 1974), American fiction writer, art critic and mixed-media artis
- Sibylle Schroll, German mathematician
- Thomas Schroll (born 1965), Austrian bobsledder
