= Sergey Syrtsov (politician) =

Russian-Soviet politician and statesman

- Сергей Сырцов
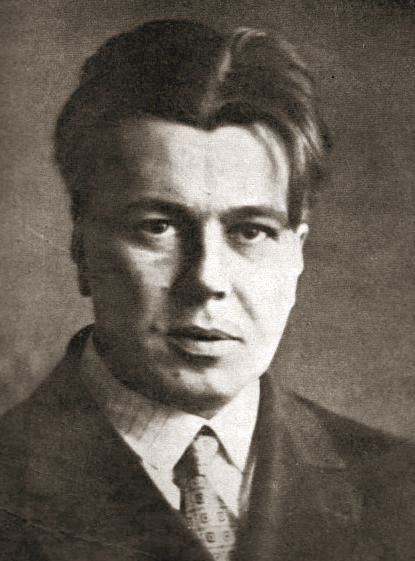
- Syrtsov in 1929

Chairman of the Council of People's Commissars of the Russian SFSR
- In office 18 May 1929 – 3 November 1930
- President: Mikhail Kalinin
- Preceded by: Alexei Rykov
- Succeeded by: Daniil Sulimov

Candidate member of the 16th Politburo
- In office 21 June 1929 – 1 December 1930

Personal details
- Born: Sergey Ivanovich Syrtsov; 17 July [O.S. 5 July] 1893 Slavgorod, Yekaterinoslav Governorate, Russian Empire
- Died: 10 September 1937 (aged 44) Moscow, Russian SFSR, Soviet Union
- Cause of death: Execution by firing squad
- Resting place: Donskoye Cemetery
- Party: RSDLP (Bolsheviks) (1913–1918); Russian Communist Party (1918–1930)

Sergey Ivanovich Syrtsov (Note: Russian: Серге́й Ива́нович Сырцо́в) (17 July [O.S. 5 July] 1893 – 10 September 1937) was a Russian Soviet politician and statesman. Syrtsov is best remembered for having served as the head of the republic government of the Russian SFSR from 1929 until his removal in 1930 for plotting to remove Joseph Stalin as head of the All-Union Communist Party (Bolsheviks).

Syrtsov was arrested in the spring of 1937 during the Great Purge and was executed about five months later.

== Biography ==
=== Early years ===
Sergey Ivanovich Syrtsov was born in Slavgorod, Ekaterinoslav guberniia, Imperial Russia (now part of Ukraine) on 17 July 1895 (5 July Old Style) to a middle-class family of ethnic Russian extraction. Syrtsov's father, Ivan Syrtsov, was a minor local government employee.

Syrtsov attended university in St. Petersburg at Saint Petersburg State Polytechnical University where he became politically active, jointing the Bolshevik Party in 1913. In 1916 for his political activities ran afoul of the Okhrana (secret police) and Syrtsov was arrested, expelled from school, and sent into internal exile in the region of Verkolensk in Irkutsk, eastern Siberia. He was released from exile following the February Revolution of 1917, which was marked by a release of political prisoners.

Syrtsov was an active participant in the October Revolution in which the Bolsheviks overthrew the Russian Provisional Government of Alexander Kerensky, heading the local Military Revolutionary Committee in the city of Rostov-on-Don during the revolt.

=== Provincial Bolshevik leader ===
At the time of the Bolshevik Revolution in November 1917, Syrtsov was based in Rostov-on-Don. As a member of the regional military revolutionary committee, he led a punitive expedition against Don Cossacks who opposed the Bolsheviks. In March 1918, he was appointed deputy chairman of the Council of People's Commissars of the short-lived Don Soviet Republic. He was appointed to the committee in charge of "Decossackization" of the Don region in December 1918 and participated in activity to break up the rural settlements of the Don Cossacks due to their hostility to the Bolshevik regime. During the Russian Civil War, he served as a political commissar in the 12th Army of the Red Army, from 1918 to 1919. He was wounded during the fighting and awarded the Order of the Red Banner. In 1920, he was appointed secretary of the Odesa provincial party committee

In the years immediately after the revolution, Syrtsov took positions which placed himself on the left wing of the Bolshevik Party, including opposition to the Brest-Litovsk Treaty in March 1918. He was a delegate to the 10th Congress of the RKP(b) in March 1921, where he backed Leon Trotsky, against Lenin in the dispute over the role of the trade unions. He also participated along with other delegates to the gathering in crushing the Kronstadt rebellion. This experience moved Syrtsov in a more moderate direction economically, and he became an early and vocal supporter of the New Economic Policy (NEP) advanced by Lenin over radical opposition from within Bolshevik ranks. After the Congress, Lenin intervened to secure Syrtsov's appointment as head of the secretary of the communist party in the Donbas region, against opposition from leaders of the Ukrainian party because of Syrtsov's previous support, which he promised to renounce.

=== National party functionary ===
In 1921 Syrtsov was moved to Moscow to work in the expanding state bureaucracy. He was made head of the Communist Party's Records and Assignments Section (Uchraspred) in July 1921, an institution which was dedicated to the task of maintaining party personnel files. Syrtsov established a system of accumulating individual records on file cards and played a key role in the establishment of the nomenklatura system of appointment of trusted officials to low level office by central authority.

Following the appointment of Joseph Stalin as General Secretary in April 1922, Uchraspred's work was carefully supervised by Stalin's Secretariat and a close working relationship between Syrtsov and Stalin was developed for the first time. Syrtsov attended meetings of the party's Organization Bureau (regarded as the bulwark of Stalin's growing factional strength) and participated with Stalin in the appointment of key personnel. The shared agenda of the two in this period was emphasized by the fact that Stalin and Syrtsov shared adjoining offices in the Kremlin.

Syrtsov was moved in 1924 to the position of chief of the Central Committee's Agitation and Propaganda department, later becoming a member of the Presidium of the Communist Academy and editor of the VKP(b) Central Committee's magazine, Communist Revolution.

Syrtsov became the first secretary of the Communist organization in the Urals district of Siberia in 1926, remaining in that position until 1929. During the grain crisis of 1927–28, Stalin traveled to the region in 1928 to spur lagging grain deliveries to state procurement agencies. Syrtsov was found to be an effective ally of Moscow in the exertion of coercion against the peasantry in what came to be known as the Ural-Siberian method of grain procurement, which was based upon use of Article 107 of the Criminal Code of the RSFSR in charging peasants as "speculatorsa" for refusing to sell grain to state authorities despite the inadequate purchase prices being offered.

In the aftermath of the so-called "extraordinary measures" employed in the 1928 grain procurement Syrtsov was a consistent supporter of Stalin's proposal for "total collectivization" and the "liquidation of kulaks as a class" in the Siberian Oblast Committee of the VKP(b) as a long-term solution to the problem of inadequate state grain collections. Syrtsov's loyalty on the question of collectivization of agriculture was rewarded in 1929 when he was returned from Novosibirsk to Moscow to assume chairmanship of the Council of People's Commissars of the Russian SFSR Syrtsov replaced collectivization opponent Alexey Rykov in this position, and seems to have been tapped to ultimately replacing Rykov as Chairman of the Council of People's Commissars (CPC) of the entire nation.

In connection with the move Syrtsov was made a candidate member of the Politburo of the by now renamed All-Russian Communist Party (Bolsheviks) [VKP(b)], a move which likely emphasized the designs of Stalin and his associates to promote Syrtsov as Chairman of the All-Union CPC. Syrtsov thereby became the youngest member of the Politburo both in terms of age and duration of party membership. He was also made a member of the Council of Labor and Defense (STO), a key economic planning and distribution agency, in July 1929.

=== Syrtsov–Lominadze Affair of 1930 ===
Syrtsov's tenure as head of the Russian government proved to be brief. The campaign for total collectivization of agriculture in the USSR proved to be dysfunctionally violent, marked by expropriations, forced deportations, and armed revolt. These excesses moved the decisive and independently minded Syrtsov into opposition, gathering like-minded individuals in the upper ranks of the Communist Party apparatus characterized by historian James Hughes as an "amateurish political plot to oust Stalin" for the violence and economic irrationality. In this effort Syrtsov was joined by fellow member of the VKP(b) Central Committee and Secretary of the Transcaucasian District Party Committee Vissarion "Beso" Lominadze and Central Control Commission member Lazar Shatskin, an important figure in the Communist International of Youth (KIM).

The so-called Syrtsov–Lominadze Group planned to make their restructuring proposal at the forthcoming joint plenum of the Central Committee and Central Control Commission, scheduled for October 1930. The group's campaign was revealed to Stalin and his group early in the organizing process, just after it had moved from critical commentary in a private group setting to the circulation of anti-Stalin literature and the attempt to attract officials from the Soviet governmental and party apparatus to its cause.

Srytsov, Lominadze, Shatskin, and their co-thinkers were expelled from the VKP(b), with the plenum of the CC/CCC moved back to December. This marked the first time that members of these two leading bodies of the VKP(b) were expelled from the party without consent of the Central Committee itself.

Syrtsov was replaced as Chairman of the Council of People's Commissars of the RSFSR by Daniil Sulimov, his successor as secretary of the Urals Oblast Committee of the VKP(b).

=== Arrest and execution ===
Following his expulsion from the Communist Party, Syrtsov went into economic work, managing a munitions plant. In an unknown date, he joined a secret opposition group with Lominadze as well as Jan Sten. This group then joined a larger conspiratorial alliance in 1932 with Leon Trotsky, zinovievists and some unnamed rightists. In a letter from Trotsky's son, they were referred to as the 'Sten–Lominadze group'. Pierre Broué wrote that the bloc most likely dissolved in early 1933, because some of its members were arrested and Kamenev and Zinoviev had joined Stalin again.

Syrtsov was arrested on 19 April 1937 during the Great Purge. Following protracted interrogation he was sentenced to death on 10 September 1937 and executed in Moscow that same day.

Syrtsov was posthumously rehabilitated (exonerated) by the Military Collegium of the Supreme Court of the USSR on 28 December 1957.
