= Benyamin Kayurov =

Bolshevik revolutionary (1876–1936)

Benyamin Nikolayevich Kayurov (Russian: Вениами́н Никола́евич Каю́ров; 1876–1936) was a Russian Bolshevik revolutionary.

Kayorov was a working class Bolshevik militant who joined the Russian Social Democratic Labour Party in 1900, and adhering to the Bolshevik faction from 1903. By the time of the February Revolution, he was working in the Ericsson factory in Vyborg, St Petersburg. In his History of the Russian Revolution, Leon Trotsky describes Kayurov's involvement in a demonstration that was shot at by the police during the February Revolution:

A worker-Bolshevik, Kayurov, one of the authentic leaders in those days, [February 1917] relates how at one place, within sight of a detachment of Cossacks, the demonstrators scattered under the whips of the mounted police, and how he, Kayurov, and several workers with him, instead of following the fugitives, took off their caps and approached the Cossacks with the words: 'Brothers-Cossacks, help the workers in a struggle for their peaceable demands; you see how the Pharaohs [police] treat us, hungry workers. Help us!'

When Vladimir Lenin was forced into hiding during the July Days, the first hiding place he used was Kayurov's apartment. During the Russian Civil War, he led a detachment of Petrograd workers on the Kazan Front. He was on the General Staff of the Fifth Army in charge of the political section.

Following his involvement in the Ryutin Affair in 1932, he was expelled from the Communist Party. Then in 1936 he refused to confess to a list of crimes and was shot.
