= Michel Broué =

French mathematician (born 1946)

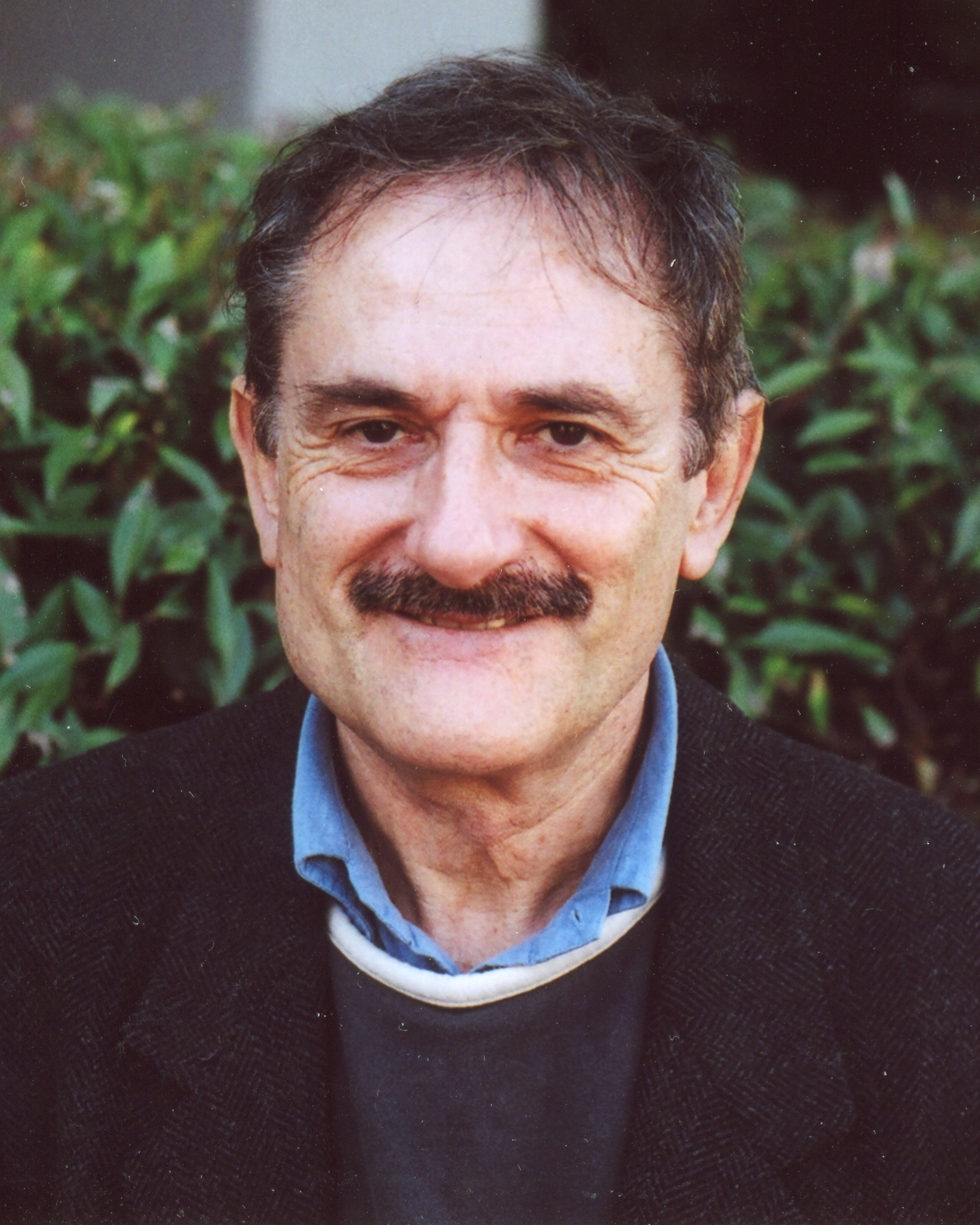
- Born: 28 October 1946 (age 79); Paris, France
- Education: University of Paris
- Father: Pierre Broué
- Scientific career
- Fields: Mathematics
- Workplaces: Paris Diderot University
- Doctoral advisor: Claude Chevalley; Jean-Pierre Serre
- Doctoral students: Raphaël Rouquier; Sibylle Schroll

Michel Broué (born 28 October 1946) is a French mathematician. He holds a chair at Paris Diderot University. Broué has made contributions to algebraic geometry and representation theory.

In 2012 he became a fellow of the American Mathematical Society.

He is the son of French historian Pierre Broué and of Simone Charras, and the father of French director and screenwriter Isabelle Broué and of French journalist and radio producer Caroline Broué. He married actress Anouk Grinberg, his partner since 2003, in 2016.

== Biography ==
After completing his senior year at the high school in Montereau-Fault-Yonne (Seine-et-Marne) and preparatory classes at the Lycée Saint-Louis, he enrolled in 1966 at the École normale supérieure de Saint-Cloud, from which he graduated in 1970 with an agrégation in mathematics and a postgraduate doctorate (thesis supervised by Claude Chevalley and, in part, by Jean-Pierre Serre).
