= July Days =

Period of unrest in Petrograd, Russia (16–20 July 1917)

- Part of the Russian Revolution
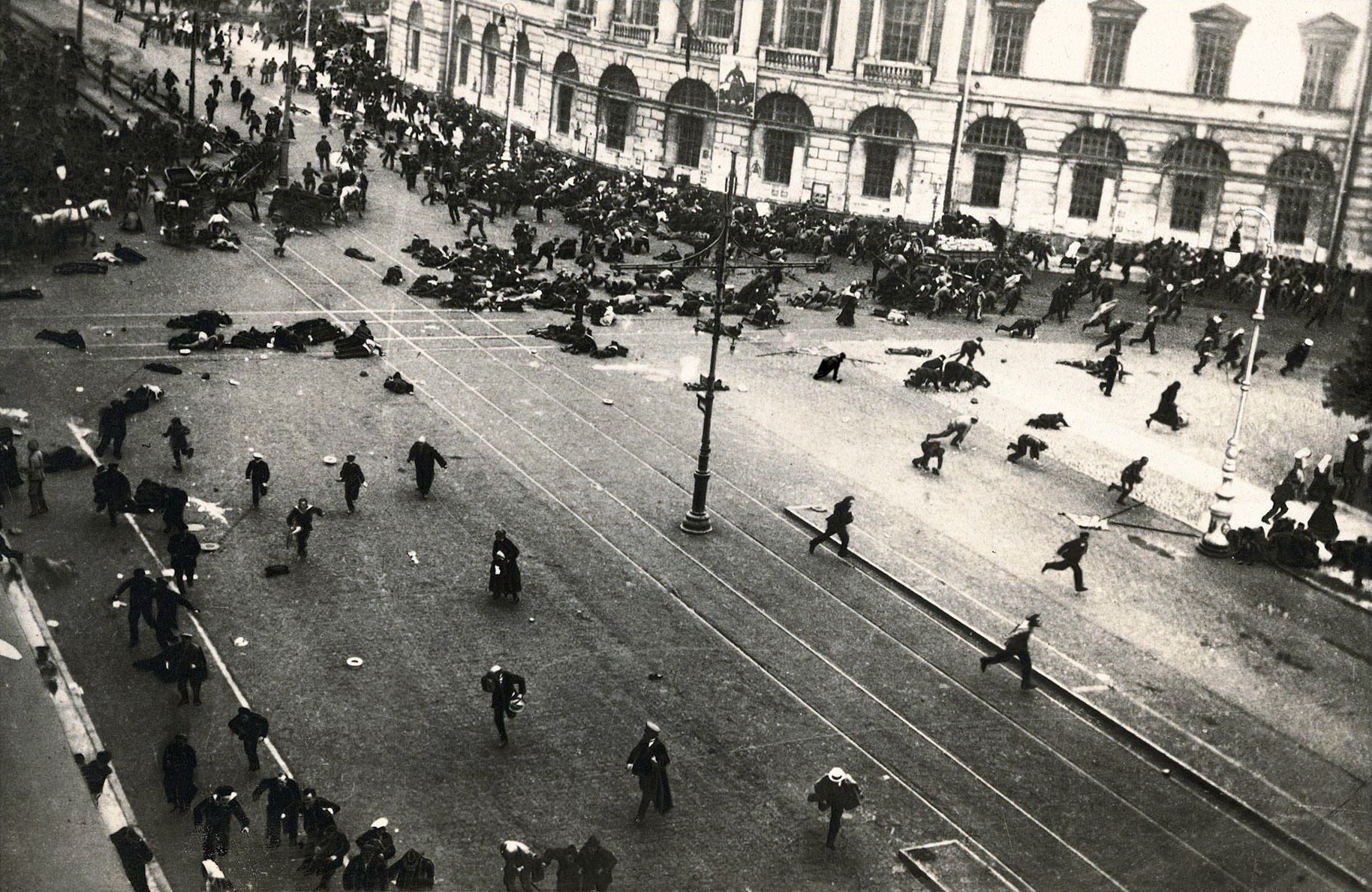
- Rioters on the Nevsky Prospect come under machine gun fire, 17 July
Date	16–20 July [O.S. 3–7 July] 1917
Location	Petrograd, Russia
Result	Government victory

Belligerents
Bolsheviks; Supported by: Anarchists; Socialist Revolutionaries (Left)	(Russia) Provisional Government; Supported by: Mensheviks; Socialist Revolutionaries (Right)

Commanders and leaders
Vladimir Lenin; Leon Trotsky; Grigory Zinoviev; Lev Kamenev; Fyodor Raskolnikov	(Russia) Georgy Lvov (Russia) Alexander Kerensky (Russia) Lavr Kornilov (Russia) Peter Polovtsov

Strength
500,000 demonstrators, 4,000–5,000 Red Guard soldiers, few hundred anarchist sailors, and 12,000 soldiers	Several thousand police and soldiers

The July Days (Russian: Июльские дни) were a period of unrest in Petrograd, Russia, between 16–20 July [O.S. 3–7 July] 1917. It was characterised by spontaneous armed demonstrations by soldiers, sailors, and industrial workers engaged against the Russian Provisional Government. The demonstrations were angrier and more violent than those during the February Revolution months earlier.

The Provisional Government blamed the Bolsheviks for the violence brought about by the July Days and in a subsequent crackdown on the Bolshevik Party, the party was dispersed, many of the leadership arrested. Vladimir Lenin fled to Finland, while Leon Trotsky was among those arrested.

The outcome of the July Days represented a temporary decline in the growth of Bolshevik power and influence in the period before the October Revolution.

== Background ==
Note: Dates given in this article reference the Julian Calendar, which was used in Russia until 14 February [O.S. 1 February] 1918.

=== Growing support for the Bolshevik Party ===
In April 1917, Lenin gave his April Theses, declaring that the proletariat should overthrow the bourgeoisie, oust the Provisional Government, and take power. Though initially received with outrage, Lenin's idea of an armed, proletarian insurrection became increasingly popular. By July, rank-and-file Bolsheviks in particular spoke of overthrowing the Provisional Government, whom they considered bourgeois.

Shortly after Lenin's address, on April 18, 1917, it was revealed by a diplomatic note sent by Pavel Milyukov that the Provisional Government supported continuing with the war, even though they publicly claimed otherwise. As a result, there were mass, popular demonstrations of discontent. In the aftermath of these demonstrations, the Provisional Government, at that time composed primarily of liberals, was reshuffled to include Socialist-Revolutionaries, creating a coalition government. Refusing to take part in the coalition, the Bolsheviks were the only socialist faction to emerge from these events, known as the April Crisis, without negative association with the continuation of the Russian involvement in the war. As a result, the Bolsheviks gained much support from soldiers, who were increasingly frustrated with the Provisional Government.

Following the events of April, the Bolshevik Party gained support primarily among soldiers and workers, as the Bolsheviks were vocally critical of the Provisional Government. Peasants were more likely to support the Socialist-Revolutionaries, who focused more on the question of land reform and distribution.

The Kronstadt naval base which was mostly under the influence of the Bolsheviks and Anarchists, also caused strong concerns for the Provisional Government. As early as May 1917, the Kronstadt Soviet became the main authority in the city. An important role in the transition of Kronstadt sailors to the side of the Bolsheviks was played, at the time, by deputy chairman of the Kronstadt Council Fyodor Raskolnikov.

A common conspiracy claim to explain the problems Russia faced was sabotage from "counterrevolutionaries", a label whose definition changed depending on the accuser. The Bolsheviks took the socialist anti-capitalist sentiments and extended the suspicion to the British and French allies as one way to explain why the "bourgeois" government was continuing Russian involvement in the unpopular war. Growing unhappiness with the Provisional Government's inaction regarding land reform, industrial reform, ceasing the war, and food shortages led to a growing demand for an all-socialist government. Demands using the popular slogan from April, "All Power to the Soviets", increased, supported by the Bolshevik Party and Lenin's April Theses.

=== Kerensky offensive ===
In late June 1917, in an effort to bolster support for the war effort through triumph in battle, then-War Minister Alexander Kerensky authorized a military offensive on the Eastern front.

The offensive began 18 June 1917 and continued to 6 July 1917, coinciding with the July Days. The Russian soldiers initially saw victory over the Austro-Hungarian forces, whom they managed to take by surprise, but German troops soon began a counteroffensive that devastated the Russian army. The offensive was met at home with extreme disfavor and discontent, creating an opposite effect of what the government intended. Rather than creating support for the Provisional Government, disorder on the front continued and dissatisfaction with the government and its disastrous policies grew.

Because of the coalition situation created by the events of April, the only political faction that opposed the offensive was the Bolsheviks.

=== Government crisis ===
Leading up to the July Days, the Provisional Government faced a crisis that resulted in a later reshuffling of the government makeup.

The liberal Kadet party, in the face of the failures of the government, criticised its ineffective policies and failures to take action. On 2 July, four Kadet ministers walked out of the coalition government in protest, leaving the Provisional Government composed primarily of moderate left socialists. Furthermore, Prime Minister Georgy Lvov announced to the government that he planned to resign on 7 July as well.

== Demonstrations ==
The morning of July 3, 1917, the First Machine Gun Regiment planned out demonstrations to carry out later that day. With the help of Bolshevik activists, they elected a committee to help delegate resources and to gather support. On the evening of July 3 demonstrations broke out in Petrograd. Led by the First Machine Gun Regiment, armed soldiers marched through the streets, with workers and other divisions of soldiers quickly joining as they marched to the Tauride Palace. These demonstrators marched under the slogan "All Power to the Soviets", wanting the group to not only seize but use their power. Throughout the day, soldiers fired their rifles into the air and commandeered vehicles.

The following day, July 4, the protests continued, with more soldiers and workers joining in, including a division from a nearby naval base. The protesters also grew more violent, breaking and shooting into apartments and attacking wealthy passersby. The crowds outside of the Tauride Palace demanded to see a government official, and the Soviet Leaders sent out Viktor Chernov. When he tried to calm the crowd, they instead seized him, with one protester famously shouting, "Take power, you son of a bitch, when it is handed to you!" The crowd continued to hold Chernov hostage until Trotsky made his way through the crowd, urging the crowd to release the man, which they did.

The protesters, most of them Bolshevik supporters, attempted to gain support from the Bolshevik party. But when they gathered near the Bolshevik headquarters, Lenin initially refused to see them. In the end, he simply gave them a brief speech, yet refused to give them his support, with the Bolshevik party pulling their support soon after. Without any leadership to support them, the protesters soon dispersed.

At midnight on July 3, the Soviet leaders called a closed meeting, and the consensus was that they would not be forced to take power. They also proceeded to blame the Bolsheviks for the demonstrations, though it is unclear whether the Bolshevik party actually orchestrated the entire event, or if it was simply a spontaneous demonstration that happened to include Bolshevik supporters. In either case, the Bolshevik party refused to openly support the demonstrations.

The military authorities sent troops against the demonstrators, leading to many arrests and possibly several hundred deaths due to the violence in the streets. The Socialist Revolutionaries and Mensheviks supported punitive measures against the insurgents. They began to disarm workers, disband revolutionary military units, and carry out arrests. On July 5–6 the offices and printing plant of Pravda and the headquarters of the Bolshevik Central Committee were destroyed by general Peter Polovcov's soldiers. On July 7 the Provisional Government issued an order for the arrest of Lenin, who was forced to go underground. On July 8 troops loyal to the regime arrived in Petrograd from the front.

== Bolshevik involvement ==
=== Bolshevik leadership ===
The leaders of the Bolshevik during the July Days included Vladimir Lenin, in large part, along with Leon Trotsky, Grigory Zinoviev, and Lev Kamenev. The leadership responsibility in the events of July Days is still debated, and the Bolsheviks and Soviets both had periods of uncertainty in their involvement. The protesters, made up largely of soldiers, sailors, and factory workers, on the streets during July Days, were many in number but weak in leadership from the Bolsheviks and the Soviets. "All Power to the Soviets" and other slogans were put forth by the Bolsheviks, but July Days was not a gathering of power to Lenin. Despite his political skill and cry for "Land, Bread, Peace," Bolshevik support was not strong enough for him to be a powerful leader immediately following July Days, especially with the Provisional government trying to lessen the trust of his followers by charges of German spying. Though there was controversy of Bolshevik's intentions during July Days, the seemingly inadequate leadership did not assume power, whether they desired it or not.

=== Internal conflicting perspectives ===
Some Bolsheviks saw the July Days demonstrations as dangerous and feared that the actions would provoke retaliation from opposing political party members trying to counter the acts. That made the Central Committee try to prevent that by restraining support for the demonstrations. Opposing the declarations of the Central Committee, when they spoke and acted in support of the demonstrations, were the Bolshevik Military Organization and the Petersburg Committee. The Bolshevik newspaper Pravda did not seem to side with the Central Committee but instead published feelings of unrest. These feelings were matched by Lenin, the Bolshevik Military Organization, and the Petersburg Committee; the Central Committee seemed to eventually display mixed feelings about the demonstrations at the height of the movement. The decision to call off demonstrations in the streets of Petrograd was made when a 2 or 3 a.m. meeting took place involving Lenin and the Bolshevik Central Committee on July 5 with Pravda publishing the news the same day.

=== Bolsheviks and Provisional Government ===
From the perspective of Trotsky, Bolshevik and Provisional Government tensions heightened when an incident with Bolshevik leaders Lunacharsky and Trotsky showed apparent support of a final group of demonstrators being sent to the front during a House of People farewell meeting. Trotsky portrayed a back and forth of each party, Bolshevik and Provisional, trying to bring the other party into a negative light. The Provisional Government was active in trying to shut down the Bolshevik actions and lessen their power, not only making arrests of their leaders but also stopping their publicity avenue by disallowing the Pravda to run. The Provisional Government took advantage of popular condemnation of the Bolshevik involvement in the violence of July Days to take action in weakening the Bolshevik Party.

== Aftermath ==
The Provisional Government faced a crisis with several recent resignations, including that of Prime Minister Lvov. On 8 July, Alexander Kerensky, the former Minister of War of the Provisional Government, became prime minister.

In general, the violent nature of the July demonstrations and the ambiguous involvement of the Bolsheviks turned public opinion against them. As the new head of the Provisional Government, Kerensky desired to re-establish the central government as a strong authority, so in response to the July Days, he began enacting measures to discipline civil disorder. This included the order to arrest Bolshevik leaders for their (assumed) responsibility of the violent July Days.

Lenin successfully went into hiding, staying first in the apartment of Benyamin Kayurov, before fleeing to Finland. Many other Bolshevik leaders were arrested, including Trotsky, Kamenev, and Lunacharsky. During the summer of 1917, Trotsky became a major proponent of Bolshevik ideals after these uprisings, even writing for the Bolshevik Press. The Bolshevik leaders remained in prison until Kerensky released them in response to the Kornilov Affair.

For the sake of restoring civil order, the government also restricted civil order more broadly. Street processions in Petrograd were momentarily banned and the government authorized the closure of any publication that advocated military disorder. On 12 July, Kerensky reinstated the death penalty for rebelling, deserting, and disorderly soldiers on the Eastern Front, a move that conservatives approved of, even though Kerensky himself had long been affiliated with the Socialist Revolutionaries.

A public funeral was held by the government on 15 July for Cossack soldiers who were killed by July Day participants.

On 18 July, Kerensky moved the new government ministers into the Winter Palace, and moved the Soviet from the Tauride Palace to the Smolny Institute.

Bolshevik power was dispersed for the time being. The suppression of the demonstrations and the restructuring of the government marked the end of dual power. The new Socialist-Revolutionary and Menshevik government under Kerensky's leadership shifted in response to the July Days toward a more conservative path.

== See also ==
- Bibliography of the Russian Revolution and Civil War
- Outline of the Russian Revolution and Civil War
- Index of articles related to the Russian Revolution and Civil War
- 6th Congress of the Russian Social Democratic Labour Party (Bolsheviks)
- Polubotkivtsi uprising in Kiev, another armed revolt in the Russian Republic at this time.
