= Vissarion Lominadze =

Georgian revolutionary and Soviet politician

- ბესარიონ ლომინაძე

First Secretary of the Georgian Communist Party
- In office 22 October 1922 – August 1924
- Preceded by: Mikheil Okudzhava
- Succeeded by: Mikheil Kakhiani

Personal details
- Born: 6 June 1897 Kutaisi, Kutais Governorate, Russian Empire
- Died: 19 January 1935 (aged 37) Chelyabinsk, Chelyabinsk Oblast, RSFSR, Soviet Union
- Party: Communist Party of the Soviet Union
- Other political affiliations: Communist Party of Georgia
- Spouse: Nina Aleksandrovna
- Children: Sergo Lominadze
- Education: Sverdlov Communist University
- Alma mater: Petrograd Polytechnic University

Vissarion Vissarionovich "Beso" Lominadze (Georgian: ბესარიონ ლომინაძე, romanized: besarion lominadze; Russian: Виссарион Виссарионович Ломинадзе; 6 June [O.S. 25 May] 1897 – 19 January 1935), was a Georgian revolutionary and Soviet politician. The head of the Transcaucasian Oblast organization of the All-Russian Communist Party (Bolsheviks) [VKP(b)], Lominadze is best remembered as a participant in the Syrtsov-Lominadze affair of 1930, a failed attempt to rein in the growing power of Soviet Communist Party General Secretary Joseph Stalin.

== Biography ==
=== Early years ===
Vissarion Vissarionovich Lominadze, best known by the Georgian diminutive "Beso," was born in Kutaisi, Georgia (then part of Imperial Russia) on June 6 (May 25 O.S.), 1897 into the family of a teacher. Beginning in 1913 he participated in student Social Democratic organizations in Kutaisi and St. Petersburg, and from April 1917 he worked in the military organization of the Petrograd branch of the Bolshevik party. In August he became secretary of the Party Committee of Kutaisi.

From 1918 to 1919 he was chairman of the Tbilisi Party Committee, and from 1919 to 1920 he was a member of the Baku Committee and a member of the Presidium of the Communist Party of Azerbaijan. From 1920 to 1921 he was a member of the Bureau of the Oryol regional committee of the party, and from 1921 to 1922 a party organizer in the Vyborg district of Petrograd, where he was involved in the suppression of the Kronstadt rebellion.

In October 1922 Lominadze was elected First Secretary of the Georgian Communist Party, a post he held until August 1924. Ronald Grigor Suny writes: "An old friend of Stalin's and the choice of the Orgburo in Moscow (but not the local party), Lominadze was nevertheless somewhat above the infighting that was tearing the KPG apart." From 1925 to 1929 he worked in the Comintern as well as being Secretary of the Board of the Communist Youth International (Komsomol) from 1925 to 1926. During this time, according to the eyewitness, Victor Serge, Lominadze and two of his colleagues in Komsomol, Lazar Shatskin and Jan Sten were known as the 'Young Stalinist Left'.

=== Mission in China ===
In July 1927 the Comintern sent him to China to urge the Chinese Communist Party to adopt a more militant policy and find a Kuomintang element willing to allow a Communist Party fraction to operate within the KMT. He engineered the removal of Chen Duxiu, the founding head of the Chinese Communist Party, who was made the scapegoat for the failed policy of trying to infiltrate and take over the Kuomintang from within, and picked as the younger and less experienced Qu Qiubai as his replacement, before the August 7 Emergency conference at which many former leaders were expelled "in order to secure a new CCP leadership that would embrace Stalin's policies." At that session, over which Lominadze presided, Mao Zedong was promoted to alternate membership of the Politburo.

Before Lominadze returned to Moscow in December 1927, Stalin sent out a young German named Heinz Neumann to assist him and "cajole the CCP into organizing an urban uprising in time for the 15th Party Congress of the CPSU." Although the disastrous Guangzhou Uprising was basically Neumann's doing, Stalin blamed both him and Lominadze; as he had previously, "he refused to take any responsibility for the failure of the program he had initiated, but held the miscalculation of the comrades on the spot responsible for the failure of the uprising."

Speaking at the 15th Congress, in December 1927, Lominadze called for immediate armed uprising to overthrow the Kuomintang regime. Marxist theory maintained that feudal societies had to pass through a capitalist stage before advancing to socialism, but Lominadze argued that China's economy was not feudal but 'Asiatic', that the Chinese bourgeoisie was atomised, and the Kuomintang was so fragmented that it barely existed as a political party, making it possible for China to enter directly into its 'Socialist phase'. His argument was refuted by the head of Comintern, Nikolai Bukharin, who said that there were no essential differences between feudalism and China's mode of production.

Lominadze and Shatskin warned against what they called the "right danger in Comintern", which Bukharin's biographer has suggested that this was the first sign of the coming split between Stalin and Bukharin – the two leading figures in the CPSU following the defeat of Leon Trotsky and the left – in which Lominadze and Shatskin were acting as outriders for Stalin. But by July 1929, Stalin was complaining that the 'Shatskin-Averbakh-Sten-Lominadze group' were threatening party discipline by assuming that the party line was open to discussion. Lominadze was demoted to head of the Nizhny Novgorod agitprop division of the Provincial Committee of the party.

=== Return to Georgia ===
In 1930, however, in "a kind of rehabilitation," he returned to Georgia as First Secretary of the Transcaucasus Regional Committee of the party (Zakkraikom) as part of the party reorganization consequent on Stalin's acknowledgment of the excesses of collectivization ("Dizzy with Success"). Shortly after his arrival in Tbilisi, Lominadze made several speeches criticizing the way collectivization had been carried out in the region, telling the Seventh Congress of the Georgian party in May 1930, "Here in the Transcaucasian village the material productive base which would allow us to undertake such a tempo of collectivization as in the North Caucasus, Lower Volga, or Ukraine does not exist." A resolution was then adopted calling for a milder line on the kulaks; while Lominadze criticized forced, rapid collectivization, he was careful not to question the general line of the party.

At the Sixteenth Party Congress in June–July 1930, however, Lominadze "spoke forcefully, criticizing the positions of other Communists, and when he finished, his speech was one of the few not greeted by applause." In the same year, he and the chairman of the Council of People's Commissars of the RSFSR, S.I. Syrtsov, met to discuss political matters, agreeing that industrialization was being pushed too rapidly and the peasantry was under excessive pressure; this was considered the creation of a "left-right bloc," and he was dismissed from his post and removed from the Central Committee on December 1, 1930.

While he was party boss in Transcaucasia, Lominadze befriended the poet Osip Mandelstam and his wife Nadezhda, who noticed soon after Lominadze's downfall that they were being followed, and decided to leave at once for Moscow. From 1931 to 1932 he was head of the research sector of the People's Commissariat for Supplies (Narkomsnab) of the USSR. From 1932 to 1933 he was party organizer of a machine-building plant in Moscow. From August 1933, he was Secretary of the Magnitogorsk City Committee of the party, a prestigious post he was awarded (along with the Order of Lenin) thanks to his friendship with Sergo Ordzhonikidze. In secret, Lominadze continued operating an opposition group. Jan Sten joined it in an unknown date. By the end of 1932 this group joined a conspiratorial bloc with certain "rightists" and Trotskyists secretly operating inside the Soviet Union. Historian Pierre Broué said the bloc was dissolved after certain members were arrested.

=== Suicide and aftermath ===
In 1935, summoned to Chelyabinsk under threat of arrest as part of the preparation for the 1936 trial of the "Trotskyite-Zinovievite Terrorist Center," he committed suicide, shooting himself in an automobile and leaving a note expressing his devotion to the party and asking Ordzhonikidze to look after his family, a request the latter honored: "As long as he was alive, Lominadze's widow received a pension for her husband, and by Council of People's Commissars decree, Lominadze's son, named Sergo after Ordzhonikidze, was granted a sizable monetary benefit.... immediately after Ordzhonikidze's death, Lominadze's wife was deprived of her pension, and not much later she was arrested."

John Scott, who knew him in Magnitogorsk, left a vivid description of him:

Lominadze, former head of the Young Communist International, was an enormous Georgian, whose huge body was covered with rolls of fat. He was very shortsighted and squinted continually. His biography was an interesting one. He had done underground Communist work in Germany, had helped to organize political strikes in Canton in 1927, where, according to his own words, he spent the best days of his life. Returned to Moscow after the fall of the Canton Commune he became leader of the YCI (Young Communist International), which position he held until 1930. At this time he developed deviations.... Lominadze, Georgian though he was, had been in many countries and was a thoroughly cultured person. He knew German literature well, was a fine critic, and something of a writer. He had absorbed too much of Western European bourgeois civilization to be able to witness the ruthlessness and cold, colorless dogmatism of Stalin's leadership without protest.
