= Sibylle Schroll =

German mathematician

Sibylle Schroll is a professor of mathematics at the University of Cologne in Germany. She specializes in representation theory, and is an editor-in-chief of the Annals of Representation Theory.

== Education and career ==
Schroll grew up near Stuttgart in Germany, and moved to France for her undergraduate education. She obtained her doctorate through Sorbonne Paris North University in France in 2003. Her dissertation, On Alvis-Curtis duality and general linear groups, was jointly supervised by Michel Broué and Markus Linckelmann.

After postdoctoral research at the University of Oxford, she became a research fellow at the University of Leicester, both in England. She stayed on at Leicester as a member of the academic staff and eventually as a professor. She returned to Germany as a professor at the University of Cologne in 2021. Soon afterward, she also took an adjunct professorship at the Norwegian University of Science and Technology.

== Recognition ==
Schroll is an invited speaker at the 2026 International Congress of Mathematicians.
