= Jan Sten =

Soviet official and philosopher (1899–1937)

Jan Ernestovich Sten (Russian: Ян Эрнестович Стэн; Latvian: Jānis Stens; 21 March 1899 – 20 June 1937) was a Soviet Communist Party functionary and specialist in Marxist philosophy.

== Early career ==
Born into a peasant family in modern-day Latvia, Jan Sten joined the Bolsheviks as a teenager, in 1914, shortly before taking up a place at a teachers' seminary in Valmiera. In 1917, when Latvia was overrun by the German army, he was evacuated to Syzran After graduating, in 1919, he fought in the Russian Civil War. In 1921, he was one of the original batch of students enrolled in the Institute of Red Professors, and graduated from its philosophy department in 1924, after which he taught at Moscow State University and served on the editorial board of the magazine Under the Banner of Marxism. From 1924 to 1927, he was head of the propaganda department of Comintern. He was a member of the Central Control Commission of the Communist Party of the Soviet Union; from 1927 to 1928, he was deputy head of the propaganda department of the Communist Party of the Soviet Union. From 1928 to 1930, he was deputy director of the Marx-Engels Institute.

== Stalin's tutor ==
According to Yeveny Frolov, an Old Bolshevik who survived the purges:

Hardly anyone knew Stalin better than Sten. Stalin, as we know, received no systematic education. Without success Stalin struggled to understand philosophical questions. And then, in 1925, he called in Jan Sten, one of the leading Marxist philosophers of that time, to direct his study of Hegelian dialectics. Sten drew up a program of study for Stalin and conscientiously, twice a week, dinned Hegelian wisdom into his illustrious pupil. (In those years dialectics was studied by a system that [Mikhail] Pokrovsky had worked out at the Institute of Red Professors, a parallel study of Marx’s Capital and Hegel’s Phenomenology of Spirit.) Often Sten told me in confidence about these lessons, about the difficulties he, as the teacher, was having because of his student’s inability to master Hegelian dialectics. Jan often dropped in to see me after a lesson with Stalin, in a depressed and gloomy state, and despite his naturally cheerful disposition, he found it difficult to regain his equilibrium. Sten was not only a leading philosopher but also a political activist, an outstanding member of the Leninist cohort of old Bolsheviks.

The meetings with Stalin, the conversations with him on philosophical matters, during which Jan would always bring up contemporary political problems, opened his eyes more and more to Stalin’s true nature, his striving for one-man rule, his crafty schemes and methods for putting them into effect… As early as 1928, in a small circle of his personal friends, Sten said: “Koba will do things that will put the trials of Dreyfus and of Beilis in the shade.” This was his answer to his comrades’ request for a prognosis of Stalin’s leadership over ten years’ time. Thus, Sten was not wrong either in his characterization of Stalin’s rule or in the time schedule for the realization of his bloody schemes.

Sten’s lessons with Stalin ended in 1928. Several years later he was expelled from the party for a year and exiled to Akmolinsk. In 1937 he was seized on the direct order of Stalin, who declared him one of the chiefs of the Menshevizing idealists. At the time the printer had just finished a volume of the Great Soviet Encyclopedia that contained a major article by Sten, “Dialectical Materialism.” The ordinary solution — and such problems were ordinary in those years — was to destroy the entire printing. But in this case the editors of the encyclopedia found a cheaper solution. Only one page of the whole printing was changed, the one with the signature of Jan Sten. “Dialectical Materialism” appeared over the name of M.B. Mitin, the future academician and editor in chief of Problems of Philosophy (Вопросы философии), thus adding to his list the one publication that is really interesting. On June 19, 1937, Sten was put to death in Lefortovo prison.

== Opposition and execution ==
It can be assumed that Jan Sten privately sided with Nikolai Bukharin in his opposition to the campaign to force the Soviet Union's rural population onto collective farms. Although he did not express his opposition openly, he was dismissed from his posts in 1930. He then joined the conspiratorial group led by Martemyan Ryutin who plotted to remove Stalin from office, and was openly calling for "the liquidation of Stalin and his clique". He was also a member of a secret oppositional group which included Sergey Syrtsov and Vissaron Lominadze, this group later joined a larger oppositional bloc which was dissolved in early 1933. He was arrested in October 1932, held for two months in Butyrka prison, then deported to Akmolinsk, in Kazakhstan. He was permitted to return to Moscow in 1934, after making an admission of error, and was employed on the Great Soviet Encyclopedia. He was re-arrested on 3 August 1936, and during the first of the Moscow Show Trials on 20 August, the lead defendant, Grigory Zinoviev named him as one of the conspirators who had been plotting against Stalin. He was shot on 20 June 1937.

== Personality ==
Bukharin's widow, Anna Larina, described Sten as "an independent-minded party man who always looked down on Stalin from a position of superior intellect" adding "There was something majestic in the proud bearing of this Latvian with his expressive, intelligent face, Socratic brow, and shock of white hair."

Jan Sten was posthumously rehabilitated in August 1988 during the Perestroika.
