= Alexander Slepkov =

Russian Soviet journalist and Communist Party official

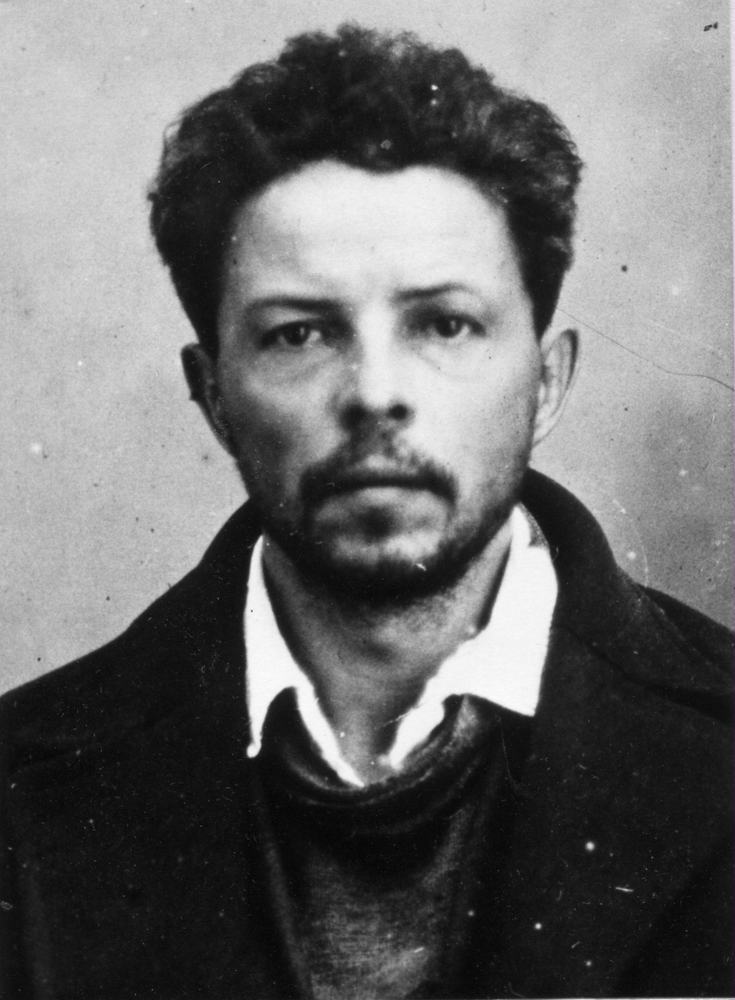
Portrait of Slepkov after his arrest by the NKVD in 1937

Alexander Nikolaevich Slepkov (Russian: Александр Николаевич Слепков; 20 August 1899 – 26 May 1937) was a Soviet journalist, historian and Communist Party functionary, executed for his opposition to the forced collectivization of agriculture.

== Early career ==
Alexander Slepkov was born in Ryazan province, in Russia, one of six children. His father, Nikolai, was a peasant's son, who completed high school and became a teacher, and later a beekeeper. In his teens, he may have been a supporter of the Kadets, a liberal pro-monarchist party, before he, and his father, joined the All-Russian Communist Party (Bolsheviks) in the town of Ludza, in Latvia, where Nikolai was elected the town's first Commissar for Education, and Alexander was elected the first Commissar for Justice. When the German army occupied Latvia, both were arrested and sentenced to death, but they were released by local population when the Germans withdrew.

Alexander Slepkov graduated from Sverdlov University in 1921, and from the Institute of Red Professors in 1924. While at the Institute, he became a leading member of the 'Bukharin School' - a group of young party intellectuals who looked to Nikolai Bukharin, rather than Joseph Stalin, as their mentor. In September 1924 he was appointed an editor of the authoritative journal Bolshevik, and later also an editor of Pravda. He was also recruited by Bukharin to work for the political secretariat of Comintern. In 1925-28, he was chief editor of Komsomolskaya Pravda. A prolific writer, he wrote numerous pieces attacking the Left Opposition, led by Leon Trotsky, but from about May 1928, he followed Bukharin in opposing the methods used to force peasants to hand over grain to the state, and the drive towards rapid industrialisation. In June, he was embroiled in a public argument over an article published in Bolshevik with Stalin's right hand man, Vyacheslav Molotov, who accused Slepkov of lying. In June 1928, Bukharin sent him to Leningrad to help organise the opposition there.

In August or September 1928, he was dismissed from the staff of Pravda and Bolshevik and posted to Samara, as head of Agitprop for the Central Volga regional communist party. In 1932, he was transferred to an academic post in Rostov-on-Don.

== The Ryutin affair ==
Around 1932, Slepkov and Martemyan Ryutin formed a conspiratorial group who called themselves the 'Union of Marxist-Leninists', but was known in the Stalinist press as the 'Ryutin-Slepkov Group', who distributed an almost book-length manifesto, written by Ryutin, attacking Stalin over the brutal treatment of the USSR's rural population. After the group was betrayed to the OGPU, Slepkov was arrested on 26 September, and sentenced to three years exile in Tara, in Siberia. He was arrested again in April 1933, accused of being leader of the "anti-party counter-revolutionary group of the right-wing Slepkov and others". On 16 April, he was sentenced to five years in prison, which he served in Verkhneuralsk, in Chelyabinsk region. Thirty three members of this supposed organisation were sentenced to prison terms on the same day.

== Death ==
Slepkov was brought back to Moscow for interrogation after the assassination of Sergei Kirov in December 1936. On 15 May 1937, his name was included on a death list signed by Stalin, Molotov, Kaganovich and Yezhov. He was executed after a closed trial on 26 May 1937. His name was mentioned repeatedly during the last of the Moscow Show Trials, in March 1938, at which Bukharin, the main defendant, 'confessed' that he had dispatched Slepkov to the Kuban in 1932 "to prepare a kulak revolt.".

Bukharin's widow said, in her memoirs, that she was "surprised by Bukharin's forced admission that he had sent his former protégé Alexandr Slepkov to the North Caucasus to organise a kulak uprising there. On the contrary, I knew very well that Nikolai Ivanovich's protégés, Slepkov among them, had been sent by Stalin to the provinces in order to isolate him, which made him very sad." Slepkov was rehabilitated in June 1988. His party membership was posthumously restored in 1989.

== Personality ==
In 1970, a memoir written by a former political prisoner was smuggled out of the USSR and published in Paris, and later translated to English. The writer said he had shared a cell with Slepkov in summer 1933. He wrote:

Of the educated youth in the first years of Soviet power, Aleksandr Slepkov was the most outstanding. He had a warm heart and lucid mind. Always principled, he never compromised with his conscience or retreated in the face of falsehood ... Slepkov was a really good comrade, and everybody liked him. He was so generous, he was almost an oddity. He would literally take the shirt off his back and give it to a comrade.

This memoir has to be treated with caution, because "the text is disjointed and contains quite a few erroneous or even bizarre statements." The writer claimed that Slepkov committed suicide by hanging himself in his cell, to avoid incriminating himself under torture, though most sources say that he was shot.

== Family ==
Slepkov's younger brother, Vasili Nikolaevich Slepkov (1902-1937) also studied at the Institute of Red Professors after graduating from Leningrad University, and then worked in the genetics laboratory of the Moscow Zootechnical Institute. In the second half of the 1920s, he studied in Germany with the geneticist Curt Stern. On his return, in August 1927, he enrolled in Kazan University, as a philosophy lecturer at the Tatar Communist University. In November 1930, he was expelled from the Communist Party and banned from teaching, as a suspected supporter of Bukharin. After an investigation, he was allowed to resume teaching, and in September 1930 resumed work as Kazan University first ever lecturer in genetics, In 1932, he was appointed Director of the university's Biological Institute, and reinstated in the Communist Party. Arrested in 1933, he denied all knowledge of the Ryutin Affair, or his brother's political activities, but was convicted and sentenced to three years in the political isolator in Suzdal. He was released in June 1934, and exiled to Ufa. When his term of exile ended, he moved to Baku, where he was arrested again on 14 January 1937, and taken back to Kazan, and accused of heading a terrorist group, which included a large number of his colleagues and past and former students.

One of those arrested Yevgenia Ginzburg, who survived years in the gulag, heard from a fellow prisoner, an ethnic Tatar, that Slepkov gave his interrogators the confession they wanted, and provided the NKVD with more than 150 names of people he claimed to have 'recruited' to a fictitious underground terrorist organisation in Kazan, capital of Tatarstan. A woman he had named, when confronted by him in prison, called him a liar, to which he is said to have responded "We must disarm! We must go on our knees to the party." Ginzburg wrote:

I don't know what could have made Slepkov behave as he did. He had always seemed a captivating person, a brilliant scholar and full of kindness. Could it really have been a sordid attempt to buy his own life at the cost of hundreds of others? Or was it perhaps to sign everything in the hope of reducing the situation to such absurdity as to provoke an outburst of indignation within the party? It was as unaccountable as so many other things in the fantastic world in which I was condemned to live.

This passage is sometimes mistakenly cited as referring to Alexander Slepkov.

Vasili Slepkov was sentenced to death on 1 August 1937, and shot the same day. His widow, Yevgenya, survived ten years in prison and the gulag. He was 'rehabilitated' in December 1957.

A third brother, Vladimir Nikolaevich Slepkov (1907-1937), worked as a journalist on the science magazine 'Young Proletarian'. He also supported the opposition, like his brother, and was expelled from the Communist Party in 1933. In 1935, he was arrested and sentenced to four years exile in Surgat, in Siberia, where he worked as a statistician for the forestry commission. Arrested again on 1 September 1936, he was transferred to Moscow, accused of being a member of the same terrorist group as his brothers, and shot on 3 August 1937. He was rehabilitated in 1957.

All three of their sisters were also arrested. One, Anastasia (born 1901), was shot. The others, Sophia and Zhenya, survived years of imprisonment.
