= Presnya =

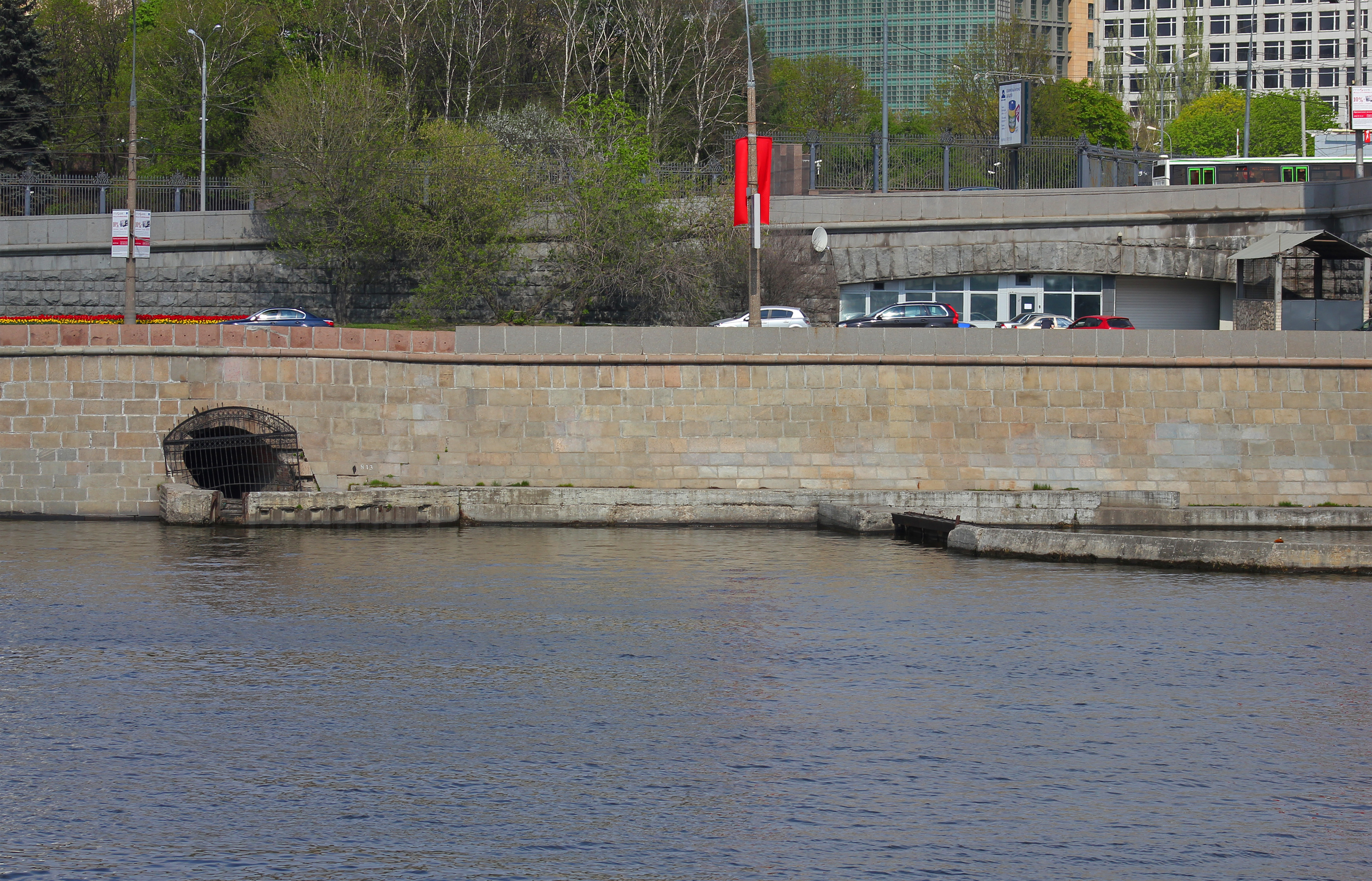
- Presnya mouth at Moskva River

Location
- Country: Russia

Physical characteristics
- Source
  - location: Goreloye Boloto
  - coordinates: 55°48′19″N 37°33′11″E
- Mouth
  - location: Moskva
  - coordinates: 55°45′10″N 37°34′21″E
- Length: 4.5 km (2.8 mi)
- Basin size: 12 km^{2} (4.6 sq mi)

Basin features
- Progression: Moskva→ Oka→ Volga→ Caspian Sea

The Presnya (Russian: Пресня) is a river in Moscow (Russia) and a left tributary of the Moskva. In 1908, the Presnya was led into an underground concrete tube. The Presnya gave its name to the Presnensky District of central Moscow.
