= Harbin Soviet =

1917 Short-lived Socialist revolutionary organization in Harbin, China

The Harbin Soviet or Harbin Soviet of Workers and Soldiers Deputies (Russian: Харбинский Совет рабочих и солдатских депутатов, romanized: Kharbinsky Sovet rabochikh i soldatskikh deputatov) was a soviet (council) of Russian workers and soldiers in Harbin at the time of the 1917 Russian Revolution. The Harbin Soviet was founded immediately after Czar Nicholas II's abdication. The Harbin Soviet sought to seize control over the Chinese Eastern Railway and to defend Russian citizens in Manchuria. The Bolshevik Martemyan Ryutin was the chairman of the Harbin Soviet.

On November 21, 1917, the new Soviet government in Russia recognized the Harbin Soviet as its representation in Manchuria and placed Russian citizens in Manchuria under its protection. Subsequently, the Harbin Soviet requested recognition of the local taotai. On December 12, 1917, Bolsheviks seized control over the Harbin Soviet, pressuring Mensheviks and Socialist-Revolutionaries to leave the body. Through Golos Truda the Harbin Soviet declared itself as the government of the area. On December 18, 1917, the Harbin Soviet declared the Chinese Eastern Railway administrator Dmitry Horvat dismissed and directed its militia to seize control of the railway installations. The Bolshevik militia was soon confronted by Chinese troops and Horvat loyalists, who disarmed and deported some 1,560 Bolshevik fighters. Ryutin went underground.
