= Bulletin of the Opposition =

Bulletin of the Opposition (Bolshevik-Leninist) (Бюллетень Оппозиции (большевиков-ленинцев)) was a Russian-language newspaper of the Fourth International published from 1929 to 1941 under the general editorship of Leon Trotsky. The newspaper was the printed organ of the Russian section of the Fourth International and was used by Trotsky as a weapon in his struggle with Stalin.
