= Lazar Shatskin =

Soviet functionary (1902–1937)

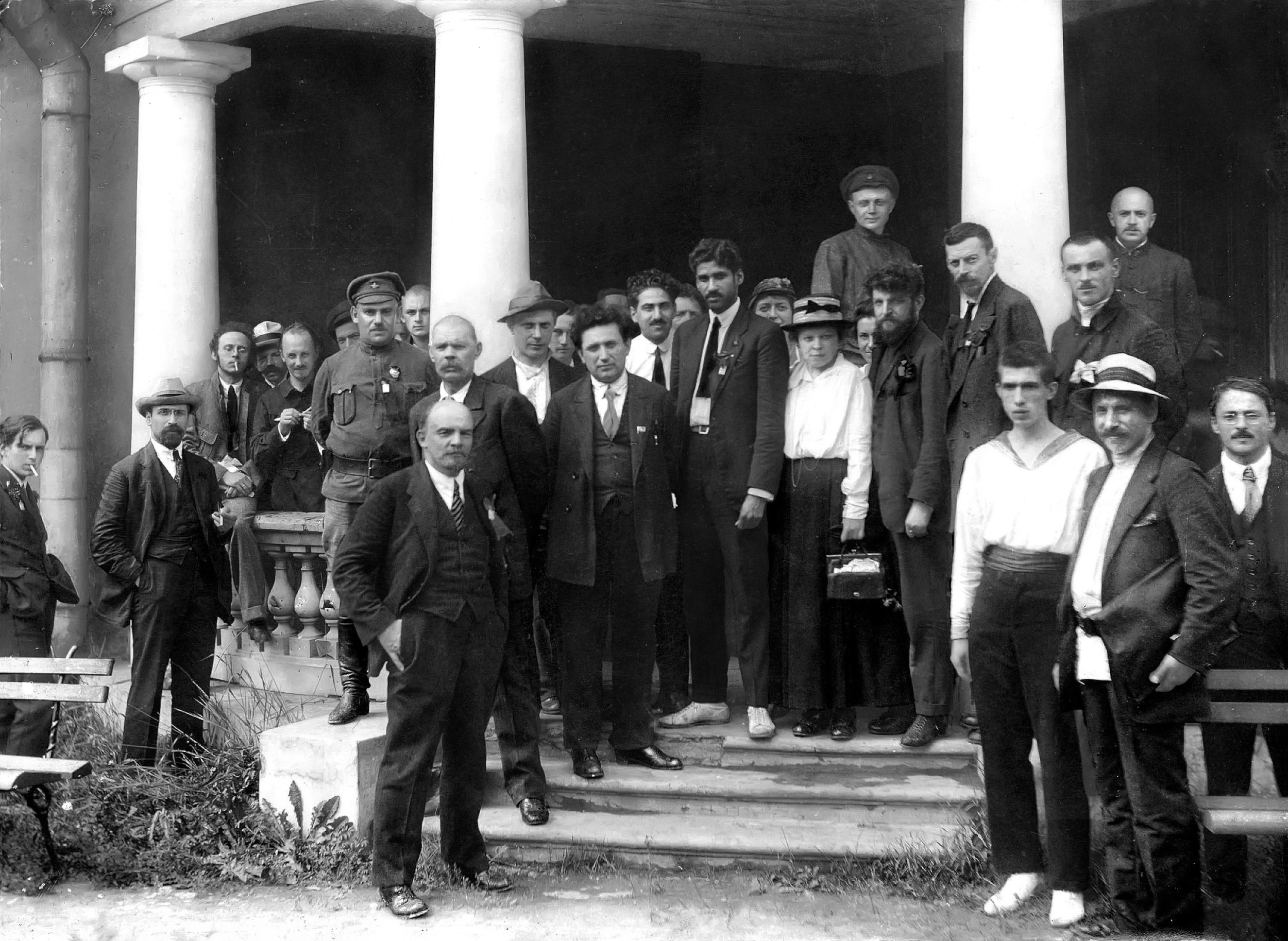
Lazar Shatskin around the age of 18 (in white shirt and white shoes) in July 1920 at the 2nd World Congress of the Comintern.

Lazar Abramovich Shatskin (Russian: Лазарь Абрамович Шацкин; born in Suwałki in 1902 – died 1937) was a Soviet and Communist International functionary and one of the founders of Komsomol.

He was born to a wealthy family of Polish Jewish origin. Joining the Bolshevik party in May 1917, he took part in establishment a number of youth organizations: МК РКСМ (Russian Young Communist League by the Moscow Committee of Bolshevik Party), Moscow Union of Working Youth, Komsomol, and the Young Communist International.

First Secretary of the YCI (1919–1921), First Secretary of the Central Committee of the Russian Young Communist League (ЦК РКСМ, 1921–1922).

In 1930 he was a member of a group in opposition to Joseph Stalin, which Stalin described as "Right-Leftist bloc" (Право-левацкий блок). In 1935 he was arrested, expelled from the Party, and shot in 1937.
