= Martemyan Ryutin =

Soviet politician (1890–1937)

Martemyan Nikitich Ryutin
- Мартемьян Никитич Рютин
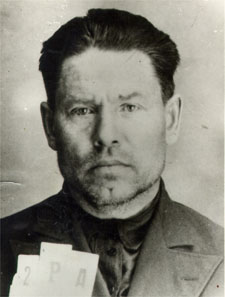
- Martemyan Ryutin in 1936
- Born: February 13, 1890; Irkutsk Governorate, Russian Empire
- Died: January 10, 1937 (aged 46); Moscow, USSR
- Occupations: Activist, revolutionary

Martemyan Nikitich Ryutin (Russian: Мартемьян Никитич Рютин, romanized: Martem'yan Nikítich Ryutin; 13 February 1890 – 10 January 1937) was a Russian Marxist activist, Bolshevik revolutionary, and a political functionary of the Russian Communist Party. Ryutin is best remembered as the leader of a pro-peasant political faction organized against Soviet leader Joseph Stalin in the early 1930s and as the primary author of a 200-page oppositional platform.

Ryutin was arrested by the Soviet secret police, along with his co-thinkers, in what has come to be known as the Ryutin Affair, in September 1932. He was later executed in January 1937 as part of the “Yezhovshchina" conducted against political oppositionists and suspected economic "wreckers" and spies.

During the final years of the Soviet Union, Ryutin was politically rehabilitated, and his lengthy critique of Stalin and his policies was published for the first time. The document saw its first edition in English translation in 2010.

== Biography ==
=== Early years ===
Martemyan Nikitich Ryutin was born on 13 February [O.S. 1 February] 1890 to a peasant family in Verkhne-Ryutino, a village in Irkutsk oblast in Siberia, then part of the Russian Empire. He was descended from an Estonian rebel who was exiled to Siberia in 1830. He worked in a factory from the age of 13, but later graduated from the Irkutsk Teachers' Seminary, and worked as a teacher and journalist. In October 1914, he joined the Menshevik faction of the Russian Social Democratic Labour Party Drafted into the Russian Army in June 1915, he reached the rank of ensign in a Siberian reserve regiment, and was transferred to Harbin, in China, where he was elected chairman of the Harbin garrison Soviet during the February Revolution, and joined the Bolsheviks in summer 1917, around the time that he was elected chairman of Harbin Soviet, but in December was forced to return to Irkutsk after the Chinese had threatened military action against radicalised Russian units in Harbin. During the Russian Civil War which followed the 1917 revolution, Ryutin commanded a military group in the Irkutsk region.

=== Political career ===
Following his time in the military, Ryutin became a full-time political functionary of the Russian Communist Party (bolsheviks), the RKP(b). From 1920 to 1921 he was the head of the Irkutsk Guberniya Committee of the RKP(b). In 1922 he was made Secretary of the Dagestan Oblast Committee of the party, a position which he retained through 1924, when he was transferred to Moscow.

In the capital, Ryutin was first named the head of the Zamoskvoreche Raion Committee of the Communist Party. He was promoted to head of the more important Krasnaya Presnya Raion Committee in 1927.

Ryutin was elected as a delegate to the 14th Congress (December 1925) and 15th Congress (December 1927) of what was by then known as the All-Union Communist Party (bolsheviks), the VKP(b). The latter elected him a candidate (non-voting) member of the Central Committee of the VKP(b).

Ryutin was a supporter of the moderate agrarian policies of the New Economic Policy and held views closely associated with such "moderate" party leaders as Nikolai Bukharin, Nikolai Uglanov, and Alexei Rykov. During the period when the 'moderates' were on the same side as Joseph Stalin against Leon Trotsky and the left, Ryutin held hard line views on party discipline. In 1923, he declared:

The party cannot be without leaders ... The Mensheviks and those petty-bourgeois groups with which we have come to blows, were always inclined to speak a great deal about democratism. We, however, have always subordinated the principles of democratism to revolutionary expediency. We will continue to do this in the future."

During 1927, Ryutin was the main organiser of the strong arm squads known as 'Uglanov's hooligans', who used intimidation to break up opposition meetings in the Krasnaya Presnya district. In November 1927, he and others forced their way into a locked building where Ivar Smilga and Yevgeni Preobrazhensky were holding an opposition meeting, and began assaulting them. He also disrupted the last public demonstration by the left, when Trotsky and others spoke at the funeral of Adolph Joffe, who had committed suicide in protest at the state of the Communist party. Ryutin spoke on behalf of the leadership in such a confrontational style that Trotsky had to intervene to dissuade the crowd from attacking him.

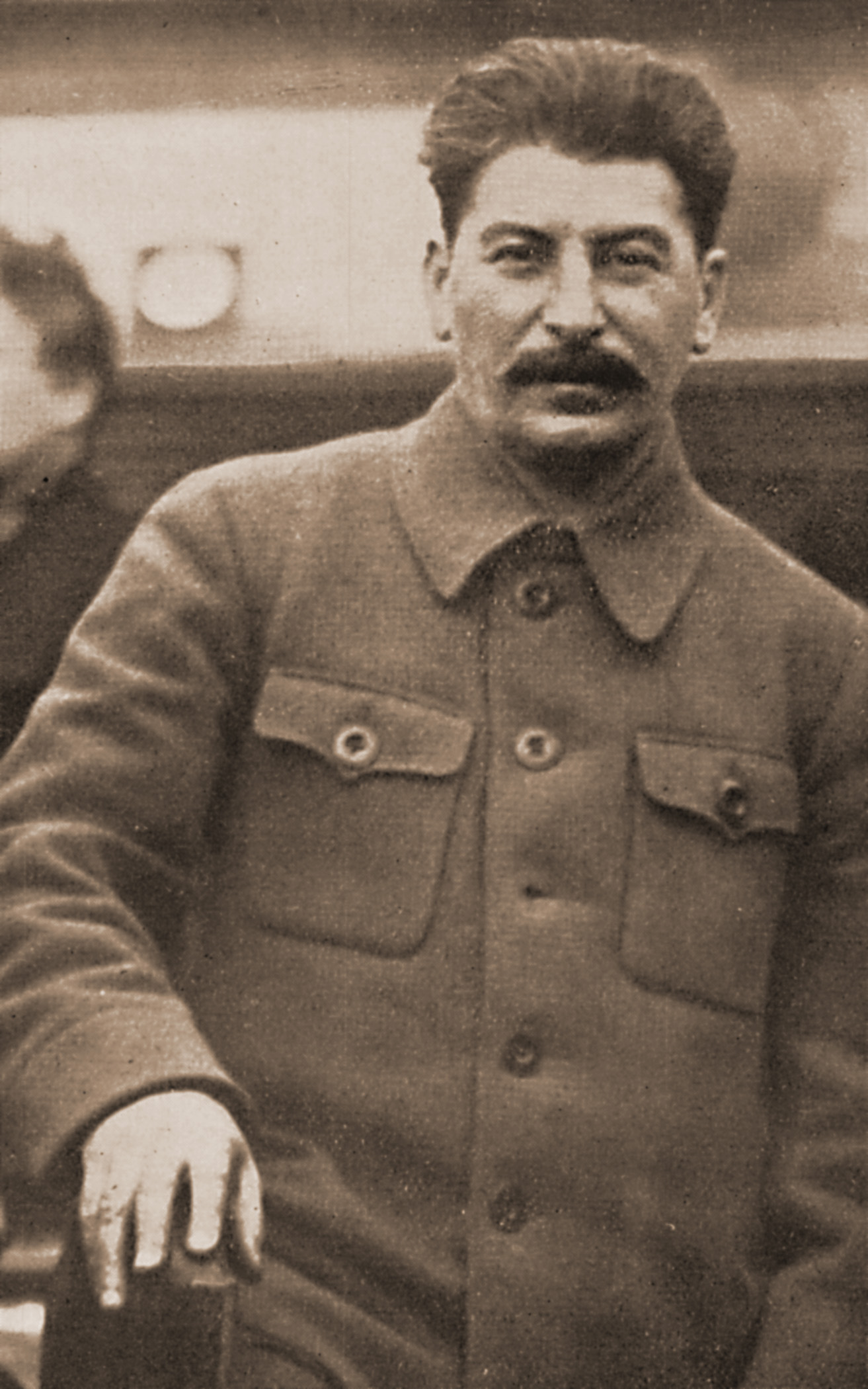
General Secretary of the All-Union Communist Party Joseph Stalin as he appeared in 1930

With a new wave of grain procurement difficulties emerging in the fall of 1928, the Communist Party, headed by Joseph Stalin, took a radical turn towards forcing the sales of grain at below-market prices by the peasantry. This action drew the opposition of moderate Bolsheviks who opposed the use of force and coercion against the peasantry as the manifestation of the failed agrarian policies of War Communism.

The radical Stalin faction worked to capture key positions in the party to assure the implementation of the policies which they favored. At the September 24 and October 8 sessions of the Krasnopresnenskii raikom — gatherings in which Stalin himself participated — Ryutin came under fire for his alleged support of a "Right Opposition" led by Bukharin and Uglanov. Ryutin garnered no favor by remarking at one session that Stalin had his faults, "which Lenin had talked about" — a pointed reference to Lenin's so-called "last will" which even drew criticism from his factional ally Uglanov. By the end of the month, Ryutin had been removed from his position as Secretary of the city party committee.

Ryutin was transferred to the position of Deputy Editor of Red Star, the official organ of the Red Army. He retained his seat as a candidate member of the Central Committee of the VKP(b) at this time, however.

In 1929, faced with bitter peasant opposition to forced requisitioning, the Stalin faction moved towards a radical restructuring of Soviet agriculture through a drive for collectivization. The Central Committee determined to send Ryutin back to his native village in Siberia to report on the progress of collectivization in the grain-producing areas of Siberia.

As a child of a peasant family, Ryutin understood full well the unpopularity of the collectivization idea with the peasantry as a whole, and the potential for economic catastrophe represented by the program. Upon his return to Moscow, Ryutin sharply criticized the collectivization program in a report to the Politburo. This report drew Stalin's ire, but he nevertheless made use of Ryutin's analysis as part of his seminal article, "Dizzy with Success." In January 1930, Ryutin published an article in Red Star which again publicly challenged the implementation of the collectivization program.

In February 1930, the Soviet government created a new body, the All-Union Cinema Industry Combine or Soyuzkino, to plan and regulate the cinema industry across the whole of the USSR. As this body's first chairman, Ryutin defended the right of cinema organisations to take independent initiative, and persuaded the Politburo to delay bringing cinema industries in the various republics under central control. On 1 March of that same year, Ryutin was made a member of the Presidium of the Supreme Council of National Economy (VSNKh), one of the leading state economic planning organizations of the period.

Unlike Bukharin and other leading members of the so-called "Right" in the Communist Party, Ryutin refused to recant his views and endorse the policies of Stalin and his associates. The Stalin faction launched an effort to eliminate Ryutin from the Communist Party in the fall of 1930. Ryutin was accused of "propagandizing right-opportunist views" and the move was made not just from the Central Committee of the VKP(b), but to expel him from the VKP(b) completely. Sovietologist Robert W. Thurston writes that Soviet leaders mischaracterized his pro-peasant attitude as rightist zeal.

Despite having made an aggressive defense of his position before the Central Control Commission, the Communist Party's disciplinary body, Ryutin's expulsion was ultimately confirmed by the Politburo on October 5, 1930.

=== The Ryutin Affair ===
Now outside the party, Ryutin no longer had protection against the secret police (OGPU). On November 13, 1930, Ryutin was arrested by the OGPU, charged with having engaged in counterrevolutionary agitation. Ryutin was held in jail for investigation but was ultimately released on January 17, 1931, for lack of sufficient evidence. Upon his release, Ryutin was assigned work as an economist for an electrical production unit.

In the interim, the Soviet economy had gone from bad to worse. The grain shortage of 1928 had given way to complete disorganization of agriculture by the ill-conceived collectivization campaign of 1929–30, which — exacerbated by drought — had ultimately resulted in a massive famine in Ukraine, Kazakhstan and parts of southern Russia in 1932 and 1933. The entire Soviet economy was in a state of crisis.

In March 1932 Ryutin was the principal writer of a 200-page document titled "Stalin and the Crisis of the Proletarian Dictatorship," the so-called "Ryutin Platform," which was self-prepared and secretly circulated from hand-to-hand among party members.

The so-called Ryutin Platform attacked the "adventurist" tempos of industrialization that were part of the first five-year plan, charging that they had brought about a massive fall in the real income of the working class, high taxation, and an inflationary fall in the value of the currency. In the countryside, Ryutin declared, expropriation through the exertion of brute force had created "appalling impoverishment of the masses and famine" and the flight of "all the young and healthy people" from the countryside. Millions of surplus people cluttered the cities of the nation while the countryside starved, Ryutin charged.

A second document, "Appeal to All Members of the VKP(b)," was also prepared and circulated on behalf of a faction called the Union of Marxists-Leninists. In this document, Ryutin placed the blame for the Soviet Union's catastrophic economic situation on the doorstep of General Secretary of the Communist Party Joseph Stalin, writing:

"The party and the dictatorship of the proletariat have been led into an unknown blind alley by Stalin and his retinue and are now living through a mortally dangerous crisis. With the help of deception and slander, with the help of unbelievable pressures and terror, Stalin in the last five years has sifted out and removed from the leadership all the best, genuinely Bolshevik party cadres, has established in the VKP(b) and in the whole country his personal dictatorship, has broken with Leninism, has embarked on a path of the most ungovernable adventurism and wild personal arbitrariness."

It is unclear how many individuals read the so-called Ryutin Platform or even how many knew of its existence. According to Russian historian Roy Medvedev, the opposition was organized by Ryutin with his friend P.A. Galkin and included a membership of "fifteen at most." Outside of this small group, it seems that only a handful of party leaders were familiar with the content of the document, including most notably Nikolai Uglanov, According to his widow, Nikolai Bukharin was not aware of the document or its content.

What is clear is that when the secret police discovered the existence of the document, they took its appeal to "destroy Stalin's dictatorship,” and usher “new leaders and heroes” into government as a call for armed revolution. On September 22, 1932, Ryutin was arrested and held for investigation. At his first interrogation, held September 24, Ryutin confirmed that he had been politically opposed to Stalin and his policies since 1928. On September 27, the Central Control Commission decided to expel 14 members of the party due to their alleged connection with Ryutin's factional group.

At a second investigative hearing, conducted September 28, Ryutin acknowledged authorship of the two key factional documents mentioned above and sought to take full responsibility for them, attempting to absolve his comrades from blame. Investigations continued, however, and on October 9, 1932, the Politburo of the Communist Party voted to expel another 24 individuals from the party in light of their alleged connections to Ryutin and his group.

On October 11, 1932, Pravda published a list of names of those expelled for participation in the Ryutin group. The expulsions meted were for a period of one year.

The Ryutin Platform was different from previous communist oppositional documents in that it was almost completely suppressed. As historian Catherine Merridale notes

"The official attitude towards the 1932 crisis was to pretend all was well; the press was full of accounts of successes and improvements. To have the truth so bluntly stated would have been very damaging. By 1932 it was possible to silence a critic like Ryutin. Opposition groups could no longer form easily, and they had no access to the media. So from the time of its appearance until 1988, little was known about the 'Ryutin Platform's' contents. No copy of it was available and scarcely any evidence for the existence of a 'Ryutin group' could be found. Stalin's policy in this case was 'not only to downgrade, crush, annihilate, but also to eliminate from memory, erase all evidence of the existence of the objectionable person.'"

A three-person Collegium of the OGPU — consisting of GPU chairman Vyacheslav Menzhinsky, his successor Genrikh Yagoda, and future People's Commissar of Internal Affairs V. A. Balitsky — formally decided the charges against Ryutin. While Stalin reportedly advocated a death sentence for Ryutin during Politburo deliberations, ultimately a 10-year sentence in prison resulted from his pro forma trial. Ryutin was sent first to the Ural region before being returned to Suzdal, northeast of Moscow near the city of Vladimir. In prison, he was thrown into the company of left wing oppositionists to whom he had dealt out such rough treatment five years earlier. A fellow prisoner, Ante Ciliga wrote:

Ryutin in prison! This same Ryutin who ... was the fiercest persecutor of Trotskyism, was now in prison, alone amongst his victims, delivered to their mercy. It was a great temptation. But since 1927 much water had flowed under the bridge, and it was no longer a question of 'widening the NEP' but of 'discussing the ultra-left adventure' of Stalin. The prison therefore received Ryutin coldly, but calmly.

Late in 1932, a number of prominent leaders of opposition movements within the Communist Party, including Grigory Zinoviev, Lev Kamenev, and Karl Radek, were called before the Central Control Committee and interrogated about whether they were aware of or had read the so-called Ryutin Platform. Even knowing of the document and failing to report that knowledge was considered a crime. Zinoviev and Kamenev were again expelled from the party for their failure to report the existence of the document.

=== Death and legacy ===
During the Great Purge of 1937–38, Ryutin was brought back to Moscow from Suzdal prison to be retried. The guards had to use force to move him because he refused to leave his cell voluntarily. Under interrogation, on 4 November 1936, he wrote a note saying: "Being absolutely certain of my innocence and finding the present indictment absolutely unlawful, arbitrary and partial, dictated solely by animosity and by a thirst for a new, this time bloody, reprisal, I have categorically refused and continue to refuse to plead guilty to the charges brought against me."

On January 10, 1937, the Military Collegium of the Supreme Court of the USSR sentenced him to death. He was executed that same day.

The rest of Ryutin's family also suffered brutal repression at the hands of the state, with his younger son Vissarion (born 1913) similarly retried and executed in a camp in Central Asia in 1937 and his older son Vassily (born 1910) shot to death in Lefortovo prison in that same year. His widow was sent to a camp of the Gulag located in Karaganda, where she also perished. Only a daughter, Lyubov Ryutina, survived the terror.

At the 20th Congress of the CPSU, Ryutin's daughter proposed the posthumous rehabilitation of her father and two brothers. This effort failed.

On June 13, 1988, as a byproduct of the glasnost campaign of Soviet leader Mikhail Gorbachev, the Supreme Court of the USSR formally rehabilitated Martemyan Ryutin.

The so-called Ryutin Platform, long locked in the archives of the KGB, was published for the first time in 1990, serialized in five parts in the official journal of the Central Committee of the Communist Party of the Soviet Union, Izvestiya TsK KPSS (News of the CC of the CPSU). The source of this publication was an official typescript of the original handwritten document; the original, if it still exists in the archives, remains to be located.

The Ryutin Platform was published in English translation for the first time in 2010.

== See also ==
- Outline of the Russian Revolution and Civil War
- Bibliography of the Russian Revolution and Civil War
- Bibliography of Stalinism and the Soviet Union
- Index of Old Bolsheviks
- Index of articles related to the Russian Revolution and Civil War
