= Pierre Broué =

French historian (1926–2005)

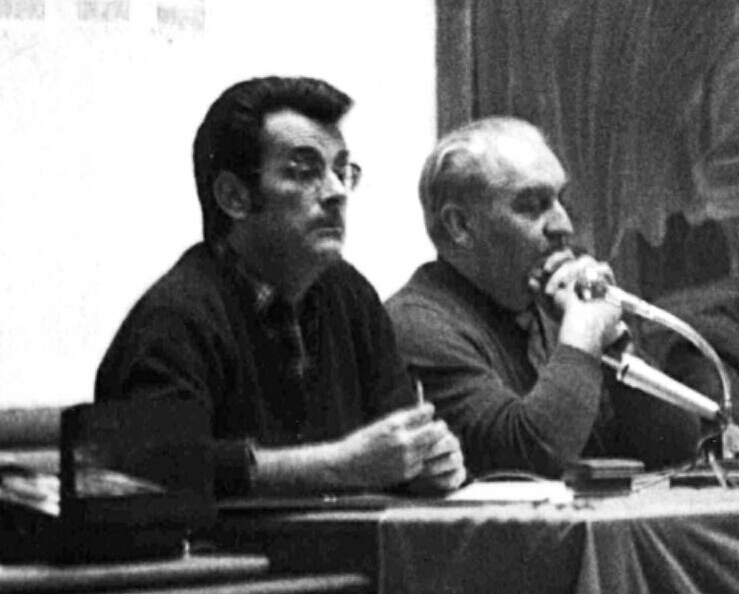
- Broué (on left, wearing glasses) seen circa 1970
- Born: 8 May 1926; Privas, Ardèche, France
- Died: 26 July 2005 (aged 79); Grenoble, France
- Years active: 1936–2005
- Known for: Historian of Leon Trotsky, Trotskyist revolutionary
- Notable work: La Révolution Et La Guerre D'Espagne (1961), Trotsky (1988), Cahiers Leon Trotsky
- Movement: Fourth International
- Spouse: three spouses including Andrée (third)
- Children: 5, including Michel Broué

Pierre Broué (8 May 1926 – 26 July 2005) was a French historian and Trotskyist revolutionary militant whose work covers the history of the Bolshevik Party, the Spanish Revolution and biographies of Leon Trotsky.

== Background ==
Broué was born in Privas, Ardèche in 1926.

His father was a civil servant and mother a school teacher: they had "strong republican views".

== Career ==
In 1936, Broué supported a French general strike as well as the Spanish Republic.

By 1940, with Nazi Germany and the Soviet Union in a non-aggression pact, he helped organize a Communist Party cell at the Lycée Henri IV in Paris. The French Communist Party expelled the organizers and said that Broué suffered from Trotskyism. The accusation piqued his interest, and he began reading about Trotsky from the private library of the teacher Élie Reynier.

With the party, he fought in the French Resistance against the German occupiers during the Second World War.

When Joseph Stalin disbanded the Comintern in 1943, Broué became strongly critical of Stalinism and resigned from the party as a result. By 1944, he became a Trotskyist and joined the Fourth International, and he remained a Trotskyist for the rest of his life.

In 1952, he followed Pierre Lambert during a split in the movement and continued as a "Lambertist" for many years.

He was active in the Internationalist Communist Party and then the Internationalist Communist Organisation before he was expelled in 1989.

He became a secondary school teacher until 1965, when he became lecturer in history at the University of Grenoble and then professor.

In 1977, he set up the Trotsky Institute to publish in French all of Trotsky's writings (27 volumes have been published). He also founded and edited the Cahiers Léon Trotsky, devoted to the history of Trotskyism.

Between 2003 and his death, he was a close collaborator and supporter of the International Marxist Tendency.

== Personal life ==
Broué married three times. His third wife, Andrée, died in 1989 from cancer.

The former student Jean-Pierre Juy was a long-time friend. Alan Woods was a friend and admirer late in his life.

Broué died in Grenoble, France, in his sleep in the early hours of July 26, 2005, at the age of 79 from prostate cancer. Five children survived him: two sons and three daughters.

His son Michel Broué is a notable mathematician.

== Works ==
The basic inspiration for Broué's books was his desire to explain Stalinism.

His book Trotsky (1988) counters the work of Isaac Deutscher. He worked for three years at Harvard, to which Trotsky had sold his papers in 1940. Broué and assistants were the first researchers to use them since the archive opened in 1980. Alan Woods has called it "a very healthy antidote to the superficial and pretentious philistinism of Isaac Deutscher".

The recent republication of Trotsky's autobiography, My Life, has a foreword written by Broué.

=== Books written ===
The U.S. Library of Congress lists the following books.

- Revolución y la guerra de España (with Émile Témime), translated by Francisco González Aramburo (1962)
- Parti bolchévique; histoire du P. C. de l'.U.R.S.S. (1963)
- Procès de Moscou (1964)
- Trotsky y la Guerra Civil española (1966)
- Révolution en Allemagne, 1917-1923 (1971)
- Parti bolchevique, histoire du P.C. de l'U.R.S.S. (1972)
- Revolution and the civil war in Spain by Pierre Broué and Emile Témime; translated by Tony White (1972)
- Révolution espagnole (1931-1939) (1973)
- Révolution espagnole (1931-1939) (1977)
- Assassinat de Trotsky : 1940 (1980)
- Trotsky (1988)
- Quand le peuple révoque le président : le Brésil de l'affaire Collor: Pierre Broué; préface de Luis Favre; annexe de Luis Inacio "Lula" da Silva (1993)
- Histoire de l'Internationale communiste: 1919-1943 (1997) ISBN 2-213-02659-9
- Léon Sedov, fils de Trotsky, victime de Staline (1993)
- Rakovsky, ou, La révolution dans tous les pays (1996)
- Histoire de l'Internationale communiste : 1919-1943 (1997)
- Communistes contre Staline: massacre d'une génération (2003)
- German Revolution, 1917-1923, translated by John Archer, edited by Ian Birchall and Brian Pearce; introduction by Eric D. Weitz (2005)
- Revolution and the Civil War in Spain with Émile Témime, translated by Tony White (2008)

=== Books contributed, edited, translated ===
The U.S. Library of Congress lists the following books.

- Question chinoise dans l'Internationale communiste (1926-1927): Rassemblés et présentés par Pierre Broué, textes de Staline, Trotsky, Martynov, Zinoviev (1965)
- Pologne-Hongrie 1956 ou le Printemps en octobre: textes choisis et traduits sous la direction de Jean-Jacques Marie et Balazs Nagy; présentés par Pierre Broué (1966)
- Mouvement communiste en France (1919-1939) par Léon Trotsky: textes choisis et présentés par Pierre Broué (1967)
- Syndicalisme dans l'enseignement, histoire de la Fédération de l'enseignement, des origines à l'unification de 1935 par François Bernard, Louis Bouët, Maurice Dommanget, Gilbert Serret; présentation et notes de Pierre Broué (1968)
- A. B. C. du communisme par Nikolaĭ Ivanovich Boukharine, E. Préobrajenski; préface de Pierre Broué (1968)
- Écrits à Prague sous la censure (août 1968-juin 1969) Textes choisis et présentés par Pierre Broué. Traduction de Helena Baudesson Weinfurtová, Annie Bardet [et] Karel Košťál (1973)
- Congrès de l'Internationale communiste: Textes intégraux publiés sous la direction de Pierre Broué. Présentation et introd. de P. Broué. Traduction de l'allemand de Jean-Marie Brohm. Traduction du russe de Jacques Mas. (1974)
- Question chinoise dans l'Internationale communiste : 1926-1927: textes de Boukharine, Chen Du-xiu, Joffé, Mandalian ... [etc.], thèses de l'Internationale communiste, rapport secret de délégués de l'I.C.; rassemblés et présentés par Pierre Broué (1976)
- Œuvres / Léon Trotsky: publiées sous la direction de Pierre Broué (1978)
- Du premier au deuxième congrès de l'Internationale communiste, mars 1919-juillet 1920: textes publiés sous la direction de Pierre Broué; présentation, introd. et notes de P. Broué; traduction de Jacqueline Bois, Jean-Marie Brohm, Andréas (1979)
- Trotsky / iconographie ... de David King; texte de Pierre Broué (1979)
- Metodología histórica de la guerra y revolución españolas Pierre Broué, Ronald Fraser y Pierre Vilar; traducción, Emilio Olcina Aya, Pilar López y Yolanda Marco (1980)
- Correspondance, 1929-1939 / Alfred et Marguerite Rosmer, Lev Davidovitch Trotsky: lettres choisies, présentées et annotées par Pierre Broué, avec la collaboration de Gérard Roche (1982)
- Contributions à l'histoire du trotskysme en Allemagne Pierre Broué, Maurice Stobnicer (1983)
- Ponencias presentadas al Coloquio Internacional sobre la IIa República Española: Pierre Broué et al.; prólogo de Enrique Tierno Galván (1983)
- Guerre d'Espagne au cinéma par Marcel Oms; préface de Pierre Broué (1986)
- Na contracorrente da história : documentos da Liga Comunista Internacionalista (1930-1933): Fulvio Abramo, Dainis Karepovs, orgs. [i.e. organizadores]; prefácio, Pierre Broué (1987)
- Trotzkismus in Deutschland bis 1933: für die Arbeitereinheitsfront zur Abwehr des Faschismus von Annegret Schüle mit Die deutsche Linke und die russische Opposition 1926-1928 von Pierre Broué (1989)
- Meurtres au maquis par Pierre Broué, Raymond Vacheron; en collaboration avec Alain Dugrand (1997)
- Mémoires sur la dernière guerre de l'Amérique septentrionale entre la France et l'Angleterre par Pierre Pouchot: texte établi par Catherine Broué et Pierre Broué (2003)
- Arts de l'équitation dans l'Europe de la Renaissance: VIe Colloque de l'École nationale d'équitation, au Château d'Oiron, 4 et 5 octobre 2002; sous la direction de Patrice Franchet d'Espèrey et de Monique Chatenet (2009)
- Na contracorrente da História: documentos do trotskismo brasileiro (1930-1940): Organizadores, Fulvio Abramo, Dainis Karepovs; prefácio, Pierre Broué (2015)

=== Articles in Revolutionary History ===
Marxists' Internet Archives lists the following articles by Broué that appeared in Revolutionary History:

- "Remarks on the History of the Bolshevik Party" (1964)
- Spartacism, Bolshevism and Ultra-Leftism in Face of the Problems of the Proletarian Revolution in Germany (1918–1923)" (1972)
- "Walter Held" (1979)
- "Rudolf Klement" (1979)
- "The Parti Socialiste Révolutionnaire" (1982)
- "Bolivia, 9 April 1952: A Forgotten ‘February Revolution’?" (1983)
- "Chen Duxiu and the Fourth International, 1937–1942" (1983)
- "The Socialist Youth in Spain (1934–1936) – When Carrillo was a Leftist" (1983)
- "The German Left and the Russian Opposition (1926–28)" (1985)
- "How Trotsky and the Trotskyists confronted the Second World War" (1985)
- "The Italian Communist Party, the War and the Revolution" (1987)
- "The Bolshevik-Leninist Faction" (1988)
- "Kurt Landau" (1988)
- "The ‘May Days’ of 1937 in Barcelona" (1988)
- "Van Heijenoort – A Trotskyist in New York in the Second World War" (1990)
- "In Germany for the International" (1993)
- "Trotskyism in Poland" (1996)
- "Five Years On" (1997)

== See also ==
- Michel Broué
