= Yakov Drobnis =

Russian Bolshevik revolutionary

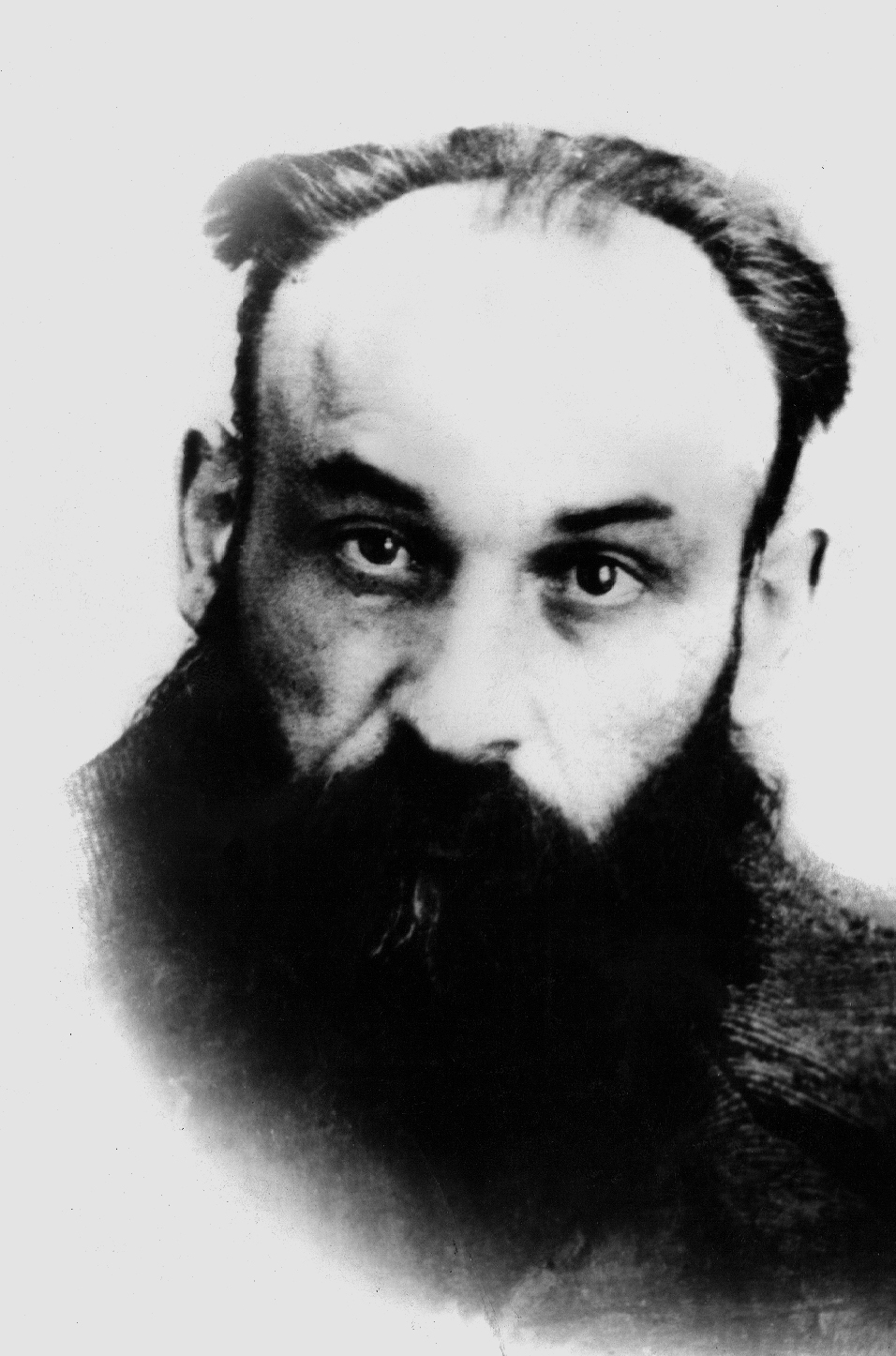
Drobnis' 1937 mugshot

Yakov Naumovich Drobnis (Russian: Яков Наумович Дробнис; 6 March 1890 – 1 February 1937) was a Bolshevik revolutionary who supported Leon Trotsky. He was a defendant at one of the Moscow Show Trials.

== Early life ==
Drobnis was born in Hlukhiv, in Chernihiv province, in the Jewish Pale of Settlement in Ukraine. Born to a large Jewish family of shoemakers, he became an apprentice shoemaker after leaving primary school, but ran away to Astrakhan at the age of 13. As a Jew, he was not allowed to remain and was deported back to Hlukhiv, where he met a shoemaker who had been deported from Baku for political activity that introduced him to other revolutionaries. He joined the Hlukhiv branch of the Russian Social Democratic Labour Party (RSDLP) in 1906. He was arrested and held in prison for six weeks for taking part in a strike. He was arrested again in January 1908 and charged with membership in the RSDLP. This time, he was held for ten months awaiting trial, then sentenced to five years in prison. On his release, he moved to Vilnius, where he was arrested, for the third time in January 1915 and deported to Poltava, where he joined the local Bolshevik organisation.

== Russian Revolution ==
After the February Revolution, Drobnis was elected to the Poltava Duma and helped create the Poltava Soviet. When the soviet was smashed by Ukrainian nationalists. Drobnis was arrested, and threatened with execution, but was released after the Poltava Duma intervened. In 1918, after the Bolshevik Revolution, he was a founder and member of the Central Committee of the Ukrainian Communist Party. He was caught organising guerilla detachments to fight against the government of Symon Petliura and was sentenced to be shot. He escaped, but was wounded, and had to hide out until the arrival of the Red Army. He was wounded and captured again while fighting against the White army commanded by General Denikin, but escaped.

In 1920–22, Drobnis was chairman of the executive of the Poltava Soviet. During this period, he was kidnapped by bandits who held him hostage in a cellar until the Red Army secured his release. In this period, he supported the Democratic Centralist opposition group, led by Timofei Sapronov and Vladimir M. Smirnov. He was recalled from Ukraine in 1922, because of his involvement with the Democratic Centralists, and worked for the government of the Russian Federation for a year, then from 1923 to 27, for the Administrative and Financial Commission of the USSR government.

Drobnis signed the Declaration of the Forty-Six in 1923 and backed Trotsky in the split that opened up within the Communist Party after the death of its founder, Vladimir Lenin. In 1924, Drobnis was passed a letter written by a fellow oppositionist named Pililenko, who called for mass recruitment to the left opposition and reputedly advocated creating a breakaway political party. He showed it to V.M.Smirnov. When the party authorities found out, Pililenko was expelled, and Drobnis received a severe reprimand. He was expelled from the communist party in December 1927. In 1929, he was arrested and deported to Siberia, but in 1930, he renounced the opposition and was reinstated as a party member.

== Arrest and execution ==
Drobnis was arrested again on 6 August 1936. On 23 September, there was an explosion in a mine in Kemerovo, in Siberia, close to where he was employed in 1934–36 as an assistant director of the Kemerovo Chemical Works. Though it was probably an accident, the NKVD treated it as sabotage and forced Drobnis to confess his role in planning the explosion. He appeared as a witness when the director and eight others employed at the mine were put on trial in Novosibirsk on 19–22 November. In January 1937, he appeared as a defendant alongside Yuri Pyatakov, Karl Radek and others at the second of three major Moscow show trials, where he confessed to having organised the explosion on Trotsky's orders, and pleaded with the court: "If you find it in the least possible to save me from shameful death, and, after putting me to the severest test, permit me to return to the ranks of the class from which I came, I shall regard it as my great and sacred duty fully to justify this gift.". He was sentenced to death on 30 January 1937 and shot two days later.

Drobnis was posthumously rehabilitated and reinstated in the Communist Party in 1988.
