= Valerian Obolensky =

Russian revolutionary, Marxist theorist, Soviet politician, economist and agronomist

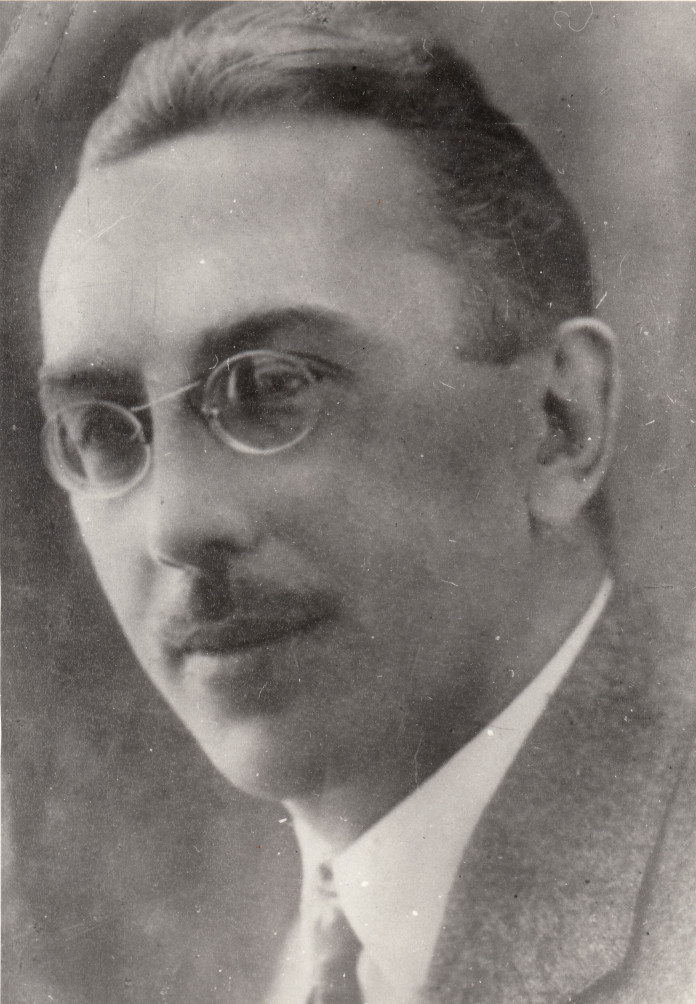
Valerian Obolensky

Valerian Valerianovich Obolensky (Russian: Валериа́н Валериа́нович Оболе́нский; 25 March 1887 – 1 September 1938) (who used the party pseudonym N. Osinsky) was a Russian Bolshevik revolutionary, Marxist theorist, Soviet politician, economist, and professor of the Agricultural Academy of Moscow.

Obolensky-Osinsky, a consistent opponent of bureaucratism, was a prominent member of the Democratic Centralist faction during the Russian Civil War and the Left Opposition of 1923. He was deputy head of the Supreme Council of National Economy (Vesenkha) from 1929 to 1930, and head of the Central Statistical Directorate of Gosplan from 1932 to 1935. He was arrested in October 1937 during the Terror and was executed in September 1938.

== Early life ==
Valerian Obolensky was born in to a noble family in the Kursk province, where his father was manager of a stud farm. While studying at the Faculty of Law of the Moscow University, Obolensky participated in the 1905 Russian Revolution and distributed revolutionary literature among students and was a reporter for the newspaper Izvestiya. In 1907, he joined the Bolshevik faction of the Russian Social Democratic Labour Party. In the same year, he and Nikolai Bukharin organised a mass student demonstration. They and Vladimir Smirnov formed a trio of young economists who conducted theoretical 'raids' in which they disrupted lectures to challenge the lecturer. When the Bolshevik faction split over whether to continue participating in the Russian parliament, or Duma, Osinsky backed the otzovists, who supported a boycott, in opposition to Vladimir Lenin.

Obolensky was arrested in 1911, and exiled to Tver and started to write under the name pseudonym N. Osinsky, in honor of the Russian revolutionary and Narodnik terrorist Valerian Osinsky.

From 1914 to 1916 he was deputy head of the statistical department of the Kharkiv Agricultural Society's commissioner for coal transportation in Kharkiv. He studied the economics of agriculture, published two books on the subject. In 1916, Osinsky was mobilized in the Imperial Russian Army and served as a quartermaster officer.

== Years in opposition ==
After the February Revolution of 1917, Osinsky was elected a member of the Moscow bureau of the RSDLP (Bolsheviks) – later renamed the All-Russian Communist Party. After the Bolshevik Revolution, in November, he was chief commissar of the Russian State Bank. On 14 December, he was appointed chairman of the newly created Supreme Economic Council (Vesenkha).

During the dispute over to sign the Treaty of Brest-Litovsk in 1918, Osinsky supported the Left Communists around the Kommunist journal in 1918, who opposed the peace. He resigned from his posts when the Treaty was signed, in March 1918. He went further than Bukharin and other leading Left Communists by arguing that socialist Russia should never sign any treaties with any 'imperialist' states.

But after the assassination of the German ambassador, Count von Mirbach by the Left Socialist-Revolutionary, Yakov Blumkin, Osinsky severed links with the Left SRs (who had, like the Left Communists, opposed the Treaty of Brest-Litovsk), and publicly defended the right of the Soviet government to use terror to impose order.

Later, Osinsky was one of the leaders of the Democratic Centralist opposition, which campaigned for greater democracy within the party and the soviets. He argued that meetings of the Central Committee should be open to all party members unless the matters under discussion were secret, and that minority views should be represented in party elections and minorities should be permitted to publish their views. In April 1918, he published a long critique in the magazine Kommunist of what he called the 'new orientation' laid down by Lenin, claiming that the newly created Red Army was "too intimately and too dangerously" reliant of former officers of the Tsar's Imperial Army, and arguing that similarly there could be no 'peace treaty' with former factory managers and other middle class specialists, who must be subjected to workers' control.

During the Civil War, Osinsky worked as a journalist and propagandist. In 1919–20, he was based in Tula and Penza. In 1921–23, he was deputy People's Commissar for Agriculture.

On 4 July 1922, Osinsky published an article in Pravda praising Anna Akhmatova as Russia's living poet. This was a highly unusual intervention, because it was well known that Akhmatova was not a supporter of the revolution, and that her ex-husband, Nikolai Gumilev had been shot the previous year as a suspected counter-revolutionary. He wrote:

Although we are dealing with a person not of our way of life, she has what is most important, most necessary to a poet – an honourable soul and civic consciousness.

In October 1923, he was one of the signatories of The Declaration of 46 calling for inner party democracy. In the early part of 1924, he was one of the leading figures in the Left Opposition, who supported Leon Trotsky in the power struggle that followed Lenin's death.

== Years of conformity ==
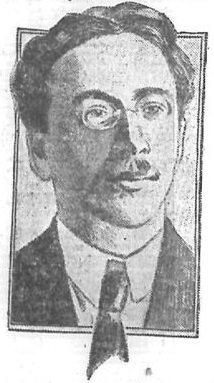
Portrait of V. Osinsky, 1927

In the mid-1920s, several leading members of the opposition, including Lev Kamenev, Christian Rakovsky and Alexandra Kollontai were sent abroad on diplomatic missions. Osinsky was soviet plenipotentiary in Sweden, from March to October 1924, then was dispatched on an extended trade mission to the US, during which he was fascinated by the car industry, and thought that motor transport could be the means of overcoming the divide between town and countryside in the Soviet Union. He was one of the founders of the Gorky car plant.

Back in Russia, Osinsky split with the opposition, and in December 1925 was elected a candidate member of the Central Committee. When his former comrades Vladimir Smirnov and Timofei Sapronov were sent into exile, Osinsky wrote privately to Stalin, on 1 January 1928, protesting about their harsh treatment, but received a curt reply that he "had no moral right" to criticise decisions made by the party.

From July 1925, Osinsky was a member of the Presidium of the State Planning Committee of the Soviet Union (Gosplan). In 1926–28, he was head of the Central Statistical Administration. In 1926–1927 he was director of the Institute of World Economy and World Politics at the Communist Academy.

In 1928, when Joseph Stalin embarked on a policy of forced collectivisation of agriculture following serious difficulties in collecting grain for the urban population at fixed prices, Osinsky was briefly reunited with Bukharin, leader of the 'right' opposition. He advocated raising the price of agricultural produce, to improve living standards in the countryside and promote the voluntary sale of grain by peasants, a proposal which was accepted by the Central Committee when it met in July 1928, although Stalin argued against it. With less success, he also argued against setting up large collective farms before 'without knowing whether they are profitable'.

From December 1929 to December 1930, Osinsky was Deputy Chairman of Vesenkha. In summer 1930, he tried to prevent the People's Commissar for War, Kliment Voroshilov from taking over control the aviation industry from Vesenkha, but Stalin ruled in Voroshilov's favour, accusing Osinsky of 'impudence' and he was removed from his post four months later.

From January 1932 to August 1935, Osinsky was deputy Chairman of Gosplan, and Head of its Central Statistical Directorate. In 1932 he was elected Academician of the Soviet Academy of Sciences in the Department of Social Sciences. From December 1932 to March 1937, he was a member of the Special State Commission (TsGK) for determining the yield and size of the gross harvest of grain crops. In this capacity, he set the targets for crop planting in various provinces, often disregarding local conditions. This was in the period when forced collectivisation and centralised control of agriculture led to catastrophes such as the Holodomor in Ukraine.

He attended the World Social Economic Conference organised by the International Industrial Relations Institute held at the Vereeniging Koloniaal Institute in Amsterdam. This was the first occasion that Soviet officials had travelled to the West to discuss how the Five Year Plan worked.

He became and Academician of Lenin All-Union Academy of Agricultural Sciences from 1935. From 1935 to 1937 he was the director of the Institute of the History of Science and Technology of the Academy of Sciences of the Soviet Union.

== Arrest and death ==
When the Central Committee met in February 1937, early in the Great Purge, to decide whether Bukharin and Alexei Rykov were to be arrested, the hard line Stalinists Lavrentiy Beria and Pavel Postyshev demanded that Osinsky speak, suspecting that he would try to defend Bukharin. Osinsky was constantly barracked as he reluctantly began, and under pressure declared that "the basic accusations against them stand". He was expelled from the Central Committee on 23 June, and he and his extended family were evicted from the Kremlin.

Osinsky was arrested on 13 October 1937, and accused of being part of an underground counterrevolutionary and pro-fascist terrorist group. He was included in a list of 292 high-ranking officials sentenced to death on 1 November 1937, but he was kept alive to be called as a witness at the trial of Bukharin and others, on 7 March 1938, and made to testify that during the dispute over the Treaty of Brest Litovsk in 1918 Bukharin had planned to assassinate Lenin, Stalin and Yakov Sverdlov. Soviet authorities acknowledged in 1988 that all the charges against Bukharin and the others were fabricated.

Osinsky was included on another death list submitted to members of the Politburo on 19 April, but someone, possibly Stalin, crossed his name off. His name then appeared on a third list, containing 312 names, which was signed by Stalin and Molotov on 20 August. Osinsky was executed on 1 September 1938.

Osinsky was posthumously rehabilitated in June 1957.

== Family ==
Osinsky married Yekaterina Smirnova (1889–1964), sister of Vladimir Smirnov. An Old Bolshevik, she studied at the Institute of Red Professors, and worked as a publisher of children's literature. Arrested on 17 October 1937, four days after her husband, she spent eight years in labour camps run by the gulag in Mordovia, Karelia and Perm. A fellow prisoner who saw her in Butyrka prison before she was deported described her as "a dark-eyed, dark-haired and stately woman". Released in 1945, she was banned from living in Moscow and spent 14 with her daughter in a village in Kalinin province. She was 'rehabilitated' in 1955.

The couple separated temporarily during the civil war, after he began an affair with a nurse, Anna Shaternikova. Yekaterina took a post in the soviet embassy in Finland, and Anna moved into his apartment in the Kremlin. Around 1923 they ended the affair and he returned to his wife.

They had five children, including two boys who died in infancy, and in 1927 they adopted their nephew, Rem Smirnov, when his father, Vladimir, was exiled.

Their oldest son, Vadim Obolensky (1912–1937) was arrested as a student at military academy in 1935, along with his closest friend, Andrei Sverdlov. When Bukharin intervened on their behalf, Stalin said they were detained because they were "freethinkers," but ordered their release. Vadim worked as a design engineer for the arms industry, and was married, with a son, Ilya, born in summer 1937. He was arrested on the same day as his father, at the extended family's shared apartment, accused of plotting to assassinate Stalin, tried on 10 December 1937, and shot the same day. His wife, Dina, was exiled to Kharkov in 1937.

Their daughter, Svetlana, and younger surviving son, Valerian, and Rem Smirnov were all in their teens when their parents were arrested, and were sent to an orphanage. Valerian Obolensky (1922–1941) studied classics, and joined the people's militia after the German invasion of the USSR, and was lost, presumably killed. Svetlana Valerianovna Obolenskaya (1925–2012) was a Russian historian.

Osinsky's sister, Galina, married a renowned chemist, Sergei Medvedev. When her niece and nephew appeared at her door in 1938 seeking help, she gave them candy and told them to go away.

== Works ==
- Stroitsel'stvo sotsializma. [The Construction of Socialism] Moscow: 1918.
- Demokraticheskaia respublika i sovetskaia respublika. [The Democratic Republic and the Soviet Republic] Odessa: 1920.
- "Minority Report on Building the Economy," in Robert V. Daniels (ed.), A Documentary History of Communism in Russia: From Lenin to Gorbachev. Lebanon, NH: University Press of New England, Lebanon, NH, 1993; p. 98.
