= Timofei Sapronov =

Russian revolutionary and socialist militant politician

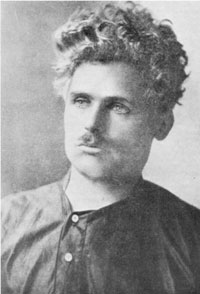
Sapronov in 1914

Timofei Vladimirovich Sapronov (Russian: Тимофе́й Влади́мирович Сапро́нов; 1887 – September 28, 1937) was a Russian revolutionary, Old Bolshevik and socialist militant who was one of the leaders of the Left Opposition in the Communist Party of the Soviet Union.

== Early life and career ==
Sapronov was born in Mostaushka, Tula Governorate in a family of Russian peasants. According to an autobiographical essay he wrote in the 1920s for the Great Soviet Encyclopedia his family lived a hut with a roof that leaked, and when he started school, aged seven, his clothes were so ragged that the other children nicknamed him "the beggar". From the age of 15, he worked as a painter. He took part in street demonstrations in Moscow during the 1905 Revolution, but the revolution had been suppressed, he wrote, "my search for some kind of organisation among construction workers was in vain, and I had no choice but to work alone." In 1912, he learnt about the Bolshevik faction of the Russian Social Democratic Labour Party from reading Pravda, and created a Bolshevik group among his colleagues, and founded a builders' union. In 1916, he was drafted into the Russian army, for the war with Germany, but was discharged because of illness. He then lived illegally, as an itinerant Bolshevik organiser.

During the Russian Revolution, Sapronov was based in Moscow, where he was a member of the military committee of the Bolshevik faction of the RSDLP, a delegate to the short-lived Constituent Assembly, and chairman of the provincial executive from October 1917 to December 1919, after which he was transferred to Kharkiv, after the Red Army had driven the White Army of General Denikin out of the city, to take over as chairman of the executive committee. In 1920–21, he was chairman of the Building Workers' Union. In 1921–23, he was deputy chairman of the Supreme Economic Council. In 1922–24, he was a member of Central Committee. In 1925–27, he worked for the Public Works commission, which granted trading licences to foreign companies.

== In opposition ==
In 1918, Sapronov supported the Left Communists, who opposed the Treaty of Brest-Litovsk, and was part of the left opposition from then on. He was a founder of the Moscow-based group known as the Democratic Centralists, of 'Dec-ists'. Most of its leaders, such as Vladimir Smirnov and Valerian Obolensky-Osinsky, were university-educated intellectuals. Sapronov was the only prominent member from a working-class background. Despite calling themselves 'centralists', the group campaigned persistently against over-centralisation, and was criticised by the party leadership for being excessively decentralist.

While he was based in Kharkiv, Sapronov captured control of the party organisation, expanded the membership, and dominated the Fourth Ukrainian party conference in March 1920, securing a left wing majority, but when Sapronov and Osinsky presented a set of theses to the Ninth Party Congress in Moscow, later that month, they were heavily outvoted, after Lenin had pronounced that their submission was "nothing but theoretical blunders."

The Democratic Centralists continued to campaign against the bureaucratic methods of the party throughout the early twenties as part of the so-called 1923 opposition. Despite this Sapronov remained a leading party figure and chairman of the Public Works Committee, a member of the Central Executive Committee and was a pall-bearer at Lenin's funeral. He, along with Osinsky, Smirnov and Drobnis, signed The Declaration of 46 and later adhered to the Left Opposition, albeit as a separate grouping considered ultra-left within it. Sapronov helped lay the groundwork for the United Opposition of the Trotskyist and Zinovite factions in 1926, but he and the former Democratic Centralists remained ultra-left, declaring in the statement of the Group of 15 that the Soviet Union was no longer a workers' state and that capitalism had been restored. They also ‘denied the necessity for the defense of the Soviet Union’ according to Leon Trotsky addressing the Dewey Commission.

== Arrest and death ==
Sapronov was expelled from the party at the fifteenth Party Congress in December 1927 and sentenced to three years exile in Arkhangelsk. When the decision was reported to them, he and Smirnov signed a protest claiming that they did not know what they were accused of, and that "the OGPU does not and cannot have any facts about our anti-Soviet work. Our work of late has been to defend within the party our views set out in the Platform of the 15..."

In December 1931, Sapronov wrote an 11-page essay, entitled The Agony of the Petty-Bourgeois Dictatorship in which he said that 'police methods' had been used to force the peasants onto collective farms, creating "a kind if ugly state capitalism" and that "to call such an economy socialist means committing a crime against the working class."

This essay was obtained by the NKVD, and in April 1935, Smirnov, Sapronov, and Sapronov's wife, Natalya Maish were brought to Moscow and accused of a counter-revolutionary conspiracy. Sapronov was sentenced to five years in prison. On 27 September 1937, during the Great Purge, he was taken from prison and sentenced to death. He was executed the following day.

Sapronov was posthumously rehabilitated on 20 June 1989.

== Family ==
Natalya Maish, who was born in 1902, was arrested in 1929 and exiled with her husband. She was arrested in December 1936, and the following July was sentenced to 10 years in the gulag. After her release, she was deported to the Alma Ata (Almaty) region of Kazakhstan, where she was arrested again, in August 1948, and sentenced to another 10 years in labour camps. She was released in 1955 and 'rehabilitated' in December 1956.

== Documents of the 1923 opposition ==
- The Case of Leon Trotsky Report of Hearings on the Charges Made Against Him in the Moscow Trials by the Preliminary Commission of Inquiry into the Charges Made Against Trotsky in the Moscow Trials 1937
- Pierre Broue 1971: The History of the Bolshevik Party (CP) of the U.S.S.R
- Ante Ciliga The Russian Enigma
- V. I. Lenin, Collected Works: Telegram from V. I. Lenin To G. D. Tsyurupa 1921, Telegram To T.V Sapronov 1919, Tenth Congress of the R.C.P.(B.)1921, Ninth Congress of the R.C.P.(B.) 1920, The Party Crisis 1920
- Max Shachtman 1937: [ Introduction to The Stalinist School of Falsification by Leon Trotsky]
- Leon Trotsky 1930: My Life.
- Fifteenth Congress of the CPSU (Bolshevik) in The Great Soviet Encyclopedia, 3rd Edition (1970–1979)
