= Group of Democratic Centralism =

Pro-democratic faction in the Russian Communist Party

Group of Democratic Centralism Группа демократического централизма
- Leader: Vladimir Smirnov; Timofei Sapronov
- Founded: March 1919
- Dissolved: March 1921
- Merged into: Left Opposition
- Ideology: Communism; Democratic centralism
- Political position: Far-left
- National affiliation: Communist Party of the Soviet Union

The Group of Democratic Centralism (Russian: Группа демократического централизма, romanized: Gruppa demokraticheskogo tsentralizma), sometimes called the Group of 15 (Группа 15-ти, Gruppa 15-ti), the Decists, or the Decemists (децисты, detsisti), was a dissenting faction within the Communist Party of the Soviet Union in the early 1920s.

== History ==
The Group was formed in March 1919 at the 8th Party Congress. It was composed mostly of Bolshevik intellectuals who criticised the leadership of the Communist Party for excessive centralisation of political power in the party, removal of local party initiative, and rigid control from above within the industry, Party and local administration. They believed that the democratic aspect of democratic centralism had been degraded. Opposed to what they viewed as a dictatorship of the Party, the Group advocated a return to dictatorship of the proletariat.

The group's original leaders were Old Bolsheviks Valerian Obolensky-Ossinsky, Vladimir Smirnov, Timofei Sapronov, Vladimir Maximovsky, Mikhail Boguslavsky, Abram Kamensky, Isaak Dashkovsky and Rafail Farbman. Their influence within the Party, always limited, peaked at the 9th Party Congress in March–April 1920 when they were given partial support on some issues by senior Communists like Mikhail Tomsky and Konstantin Yurenev. Nonetheless, their proposals were voted down. They were active during the intra-Party "trade union discussion" in late 1920-early 1921 when the Party split into numerous factions, but didn't gather much support and the faction became moribund after the 10th Party Congress in March 1921.

The Group's leaders continued to protest what they saw as a gradual abolition of intra-Party democracy throughout the early 1920s and joined Leon Trotsky's Left Opposition in 1923. In 1926 Sapronov and Smirnov formed the "Group of 15", which joined the United Opposition headed by Trotsky, Grigory Zinoviev and Lev Kamenev. They were expelled from the Communist Party at the 15th Party Congress in December 1927 along with the rest of the United Opposition. Although some of them repented and were re-admitted to the Party in the early 1930s, they were purged, charged and executed during the Great Purge in the late 1930s.

- Obolensky-Ossinsky attended the World Social Economic Conference organised by the International Industrial Relations Institute held at the Vereeniging Koloniaal Institute, Amsterdam. This was the first occasion that Soviet officials had travelled to the West to discuss how the Five Year Plan worked. He was executed in 1938.
