= United Opposition (Soviet Union) =

Political alliance of Soviet communists against Joseph Stalin

- Leader: Leon Trotsky; Grigory Zinoviev; Lev Kamenev
- Founded: May 1926
- Dissolved: December 1927
- Merger of: Left Opposition; New Opposition
- Succeeded by: Bloc of Soviet Oppositions
- Ideology: Communism; Marxism; Leninism; Anti-Stalinism; Trotskyism (faction); Zinovievism (faction); Left-communism (faction)
- Political position: Left-wing to far-left
- National affiliation: All-Union Communist Party (Bolsheviks)

The United Opposition (Russian: Объединённая оппозиция, romanized: Ob"yedinennaya oppozitsiya, sometimes translated Joint Opposition) was a group formed in the All-Union Communist Party (Bolsheviks) in early 1926, when the Left Opposition led by Leon Trotsky, merged with the New Opposition led by Grigory Zinoviev and his close ally Lev Kamenev, in order to strengthen opposition against the Joseph Stalin-led Centre. The United Opposition demanded, among other things, greater freedom of expression within the Communist Party, the dismantling of the New Economic Policy (NEP), more development of heavy industry, and less bureaucracy. The group was effectively destroyed by Stalin's majority by the end of 1927, having had only limited success.

== Background and Formation ==
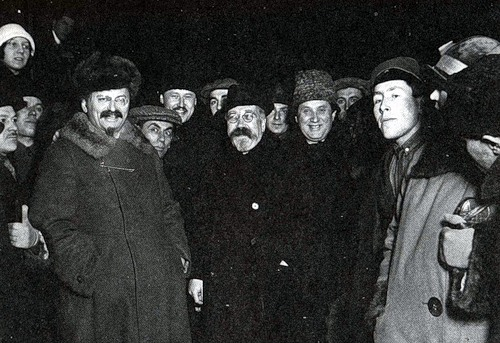
Trotsky, Kamenev and Zinoviev pictured in 1926

To promote party unity, factions within the Bolshevik party were banned at the 10th Party Congress in 1921. Despite the ban, unofficial factions remained, and differing opinions continued to be voiced. The future goals of the United Opposition were expressed by multiple groups throughout the 1920s. In 1923, echoing letters that Trotsky wrote to the Central Committee during the same period, dissident party members released the "Declaration of 46," criticizing growing bureaucratization and censorship within the party. The Platform criticized the leadership structure of the party, where decisions were increasingly dictated from the top, and the influence of workers and average voters was steadily decreased. Despite the efforts of the oppositionists, Trotsky prominent among them, the 13th Party Congress condemned the opposition in May 1924. Both Zinoviev and Kamenev opposed Trotsky at this time.

"We say that there can now be no doubt whatever that, as the evolution of the directing line of the faction (i.e., the majority of the Central Committee) has shown, the main core of the 1923 opposition correctly warned against the danger of a shift from the proletarian line, and against the ominous growth of the apparatus regime."

— Grigory Zinoviev on the Left Opposition in 1926.

The positions of Trotsky, Zinoviev and Kamenev began to come together in 1925. All three men were against Stalin and Bukharin's theory of "socialism in one country," and were increasingly opposed to the New Economic Policy, which promoted farming over heavy industry. All of them advocated for more state planning and higher industrial investment. As a natural extension of their oppositional views, Zinoviev and Kamenev both began to support increased dissent within the party and less bureaucratization, much as Trotsky had done since 1923. Lenin's widow, Nadezhda Krupskaia, also briefly lent her support to the opposition. However, there was no major organized oppositional bloc. Despite similarities in their policy, Trotsky was not actively working with Zinoviev and Kamenev in 1925, and their opposition was not coordinated. Oppositional voices boldly raised against Stalin at the Fourteenth Party Congress were easily voted down.

The grouping was proposed by the Group of 15, a small faction around Vladimir Smirnov which claimed that the Soviet Union was no longer a workers' state. They brought together Trotsky's Left Opposition and Zinoviev's New Opposition (also known as the Opposition of 1925), despite them both having many differences with the Group of 15, particularly over the question of whether the Soviet Union was still a workers' state. Many former supporters of the Workers' Opposition also joined the United Opposition.

In 1927, Trotsky and the United Opposition had argued for the expansion of industrial democracy with their joint platform which demanded majority representation of workers in trade union congresses including the All-Union Congress and an increase of non-party workers to one-third of representation in these elected organs. They also supported legal protection for worker's right to criticise such as the right to make independent proposals. According to historian Vadim Rogovin, these proposals would have developed democracy in the sphere of production and facilitated the establishment of worker's control over economic management.

== The United Opposition ==
"A War of the imperialists against the Soviet Union is not only probable, but inevitable. To postpone this danger, to gain as much time as possible for strengthening the Soviet Union and consolidating the international revolutionary proletariat, should be one of our chief practical concerns. Only a victorious proletarian revolution in the dominant countries can finally remove this danger.."

— Platform of the Joint Opposition 1927

Smirnov's Group of 15 left the United Opposition soon after its formation over increasing differences between themselves and Kamenev and Zinoviev's supporters. The United Opposition quickly started agitating for a more worker-focused party, as opposed to the more peasant-focused policies surrounding the NEP, as well as for greater party democratization. They wanted a greater ability to express dissent within the party and more autonomy for workers' unions.

In May 1926, Trotsky, Zinoviev and 82 others signed a declaration denouncing Stalin's leadership. The Central Committee responded two months later with a demand that the United Opposition rescind their calls for new party leadership, which the Opposition duly refused. Their 1926 platform explicitly criticized the lack of democracy and debate permitted in the party, noting that "no resolutions anywhere are ever adopted otherwise than 'unanimously."'

The United Opposition first emerged openly at the joint plenum of the Central Committee and Central Control Commission of the VKP(baa0, held from July 14–23, 1926. This session saw the "Declaration of the 13" advance its program, which revolved primarily around the question of industrialization and the internal political situation in the Communist Party.

In October 1926, Stalin's supporters voted Trotsky out of the Politburo. By October 1926 Kamenev and Zinoviev had also been removed from the Politburo, and Zinoviev lost his position as head of the Comintern. Attempts by the opposition to gain broader support among Soviet citizens failed. Stalin negotiated with leaders of the United Opposition, encouraging them to accept party decisions and renounce factions in exchange for a greater ability to express their views within the party. Bukharin, similarly, invited members of the United Opposition to swear off factions and ask the party for forgiveness. Many members of the United Opposition, accepting the compromise or fearing the consequences of continuing the fight, duly apologized and recommitted themselves against factionalism. Many supporters of Kamenev and Zinoviev's group, as well as most from the Workers Opposition grouping, had left the United Opposition by mid-1927, changing sides under the growing political pressure and espousing support for Stalin.

Despite the threats and promises, much of the United Opposition continued on. In September 1927, their new official platform was released. The platform argued that capitalist influences were seeping into the country through the NEP, criticized Stalin and the Bolshevik's leadership, and bemoaned the lack of free discourse that was allowed within the party, ultimately concluding that the party was straying from true Leninism. The criticism of Stalin had grown from a more general criticism of the party leadership in 1926 to direct attacks on Stalin's abilities and dictatorial tendencies by the end of 1927.

The United Opposition also actively worked to undermine Stalin and influence the general public. Demonstrations were organized, which attracted some minor public support. In November 1927, the United Opposition held a demonstration in Red Square, Moscow, along with Vladimir Lenin's widow, Nadezhda Krupskaya. Members also illegally distributed Lenin's testament, a suppressed document of disputed authenticity in which Lenin allegedly expressed his distrust of Stalin and his support for Trotsky. Once again, this failed to attract significant support, and the Opposition remained the clear minority within the party. The police began to crack down on the United Opposition, arresting many members.

Trotsky and Zinoviev lost much of their remaining influence when they were expelled from the Central Committee. The United Opposition were unable to gain the support of more than a small minority of the Communist Party, and were expelled at the Fifteenth Party Congress in December 1927 after the Congress declared United Opposition views to be incompatible with Communist Party membership.

== Aftermath ==
Trotsky was first exiled to Alma-Ata in 1928 only to be subsequently expelled from the USSR in 1929, spending the remainder of his life in exile. Though he continued to agitate against Stalin, primarily through his writings. Trotsky formed the International Left Opposition with his remaining supporters, and the Group of 15 also continued its opposition to Stalin. Trotsky, Zinoviev and Kamenev later created an anti-Stalin bloc in 1932, which seemed to have been dissolved in early 1933. Supporters of these groups were soon exiled or imprisoned, and by the end of 1941, nearly all former supporters of the United Opposition, whether or not they had repudiated it, had been executed or assassinated on Stalin's orders. Zinoviev and Kamenev would generally remain loyal to Stalin, although Bukharin attempted to ally with them against Stalin in 1928. While Bukharin received no help, Stalin would nevertheless use this meeting as proof of Kamenev and Zinoviev's continued plotting.

Zinoviev and Kamenev were both sentenced to death and executed at the end of a show trial in 1936, an event regarded by historians as the launch of the Great Purge. In 1940, Trotsky was murdered in Mexico by a Soviet agent.

== Notes ==
- Isaac Deutscher. The Prophet Unarmed: Trotsky 1921–1929. Oxford University Press, 1959, ISBN 1-85984-446-4. p. 279.
