= Nikolai Bukharin =

Soviet revolutionary and politician (1888–1938)

- Николай Бухарин
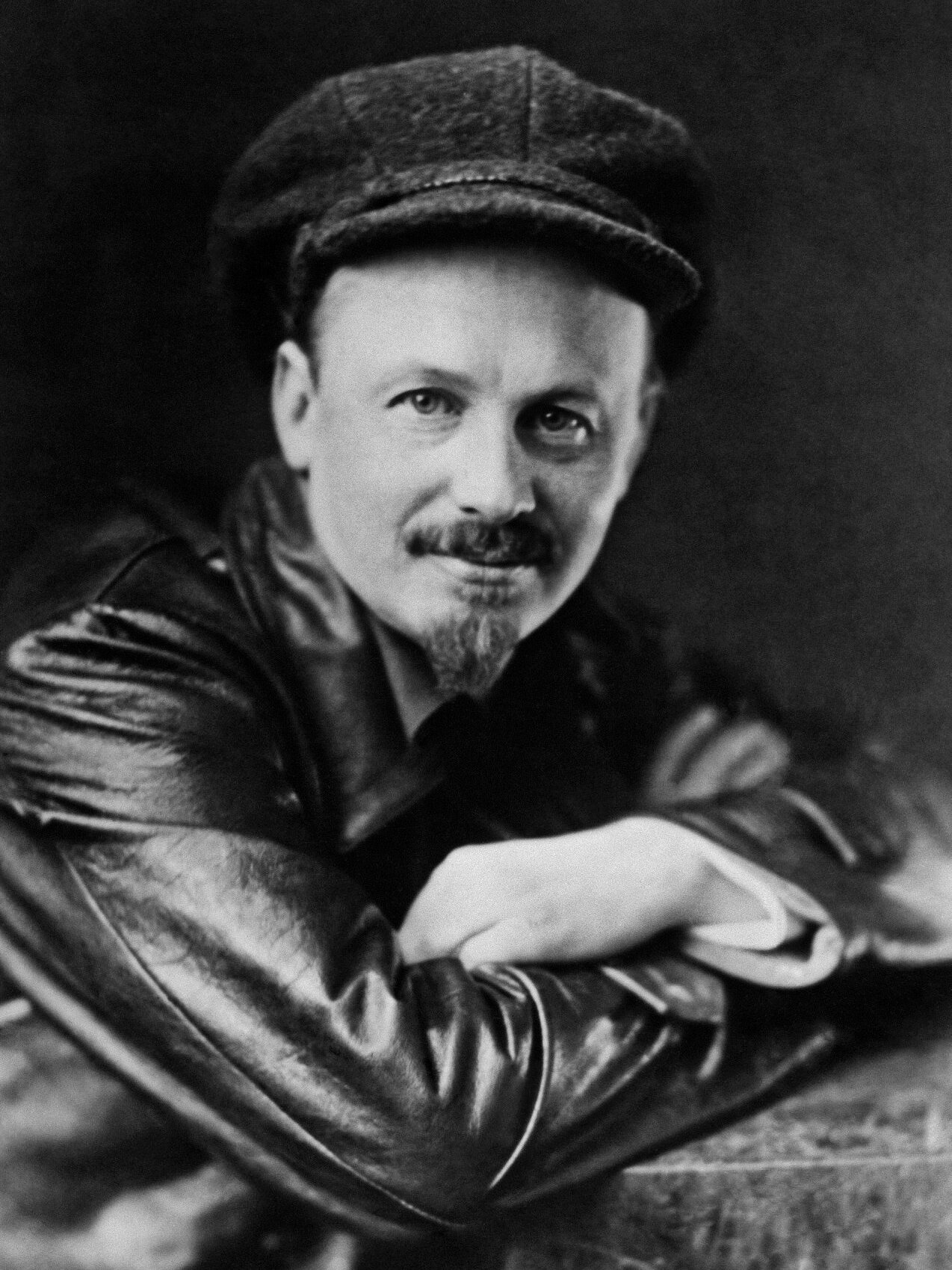
- Bukharin c. 1920s

General Secretary of the Executive Committee of the Communist International
- In office November 1926 – April 1929
- Preceded by: Grigori Zinoviev
- Succeeded by: Vyacheslav Molotov

Editor-in-chief of Pravda
- In office November 1918 – April 1929
- Preceded by: Joseph Stalin
- Succeeded by: Mikhail Olminsky

Full member of the 13th, 14th, 15th Politburo
- In office 2 June 1924 – 17 November 1929

Candidate member of the 8th, 9th, 10th, 11th, 12th Politburo
- In office 8 March 1919 – 2 June 1924

Personal details
- Born: Nikolai Ivanovich Bukharin; 9 October 1888 Moscow, Russia
- Died: 15 March 1938 (aged 49) Moscow, Soviet Union
- Cause of death: Execution by firing squad
- Resting place: Kommunarka shooting ground
- Party: RSDLP (Bolsheviks) (1906–1918); CPSU (1918–1937)
- Spouses: Nadezhda Lukin; Esfir' Gurvich; Anna Larina
- Children: 2
- Education: Imperial Moscow University (1911)

Nikolai Ivanovich Bukharin (/buːˈxɑːrɪn/; Russian: Николай Иванович Бухарин, IPA: [nʲɪkɐˈlaj ɪˈvanəvʲɪdʑ bʊˈxarʲɪn]; 9 October [O.S. 27 September] 1888 – 15 March 1938) was a Russian revolutionary, Soviet politician, and Marxist theorist. A prominent Bolshevik described by Vladimir Lenin as a "most valuable and major theorist" of the Communist Party, Bukharin was active in the Soviet government from 1917 until his purge in 1937. His political and economic system of thought is known as Bukharinism.

Bukharin joined the Russian Social Democratic Labour Party in 1906, and studied economics at Moscow Imperial University. In 1910, he was arrested and internally exiled to Onega, but the following year he escaped abroad, where he met Lenin and Leon Trotsky and built his reputation with works such as Imperialism and World Economy (1915). After the February Revolution of 1917, Bukharin returned to Moscow and became a leading figure in the party, and after the October Revolution became editor of its newspaper, Pravda. He led the Left Communist faction in 1918, and during the civil war wrote The ABC of Communism (1920; with Yevgeni Preobrazhensky) and Historical Materialism: A System of Sociology (1921), among other works.

Bukharin was initially a proponent of war communism, but in 1921 supported the introduction of the New Economic Policy (NEP) and became its chief theorist and advocate, supporting the party leadership against Trotsky and the Left Opposition. By late 1924, this stance had positioned Bukharin favourably as Joseph Stalin's chief ally, with Bukharin soon elaborating Stalin's theory of "socialism in one country". From 1926 to 1929, Bukharin served as General Secretary of the Comintern's executive committee. Following Stalin's decision to proceed with agricultural collectivisation in the Great Break, Bukharin was labelled as the leader of the Right Opposition and was removed from Pravda, the Comintern, and the party leadership in 1929.

After a period in lower positions, in 1934 Bukharin was reelected to the Central Committee and became editor of the newspaper Izvestia. He was a principal architect of the 1936 Soviet Constitution. During the Great Purge, Bukharin was accused of treason in February 1937 and executed after a show trial in 1938.

== Before 1917 ==
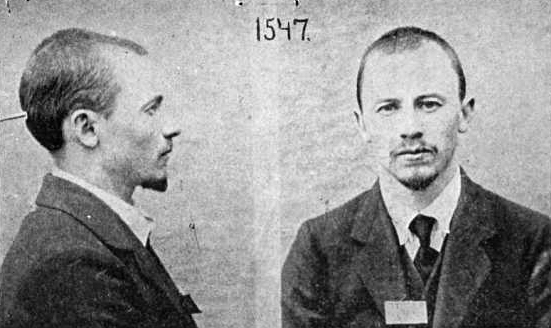
Bukharin's Okhrana mugshot c. 1909–1911

Nikolai Bukharin was born on 27 September (9 October, new style), 1888, in Moscow. He was the second son of two schoolteachers, Ivan Gavrilovich Bukharin and Liubov Ivanovna Bukharina. According to Nikolai, his father did not believe in God and, from the age of four, often asked him to recite poetry for family friends. His childhood is vividly recounted in his mostly autobiographic novel How It All Began.

Bukharin's political life began at the age of sixteen, with his lifelong friend Ilya Ehrenburg, when they participated in student activities at Moscow University related to the Russian Revolution of 1905. He joined the Russian Social Democratic Labour Party in 1906, and became a member of its Bolshevik faction. With Grigori Sokolnikov, Bukharin convened the 1907 national youth conference in Moscow, which was later considered the founding of Komsomol.

By age twenty, he was a member of the Moscow Committee of the party. The committee was widely infiltrated by the Tsarist secret police, the Okhrana. As one of its leaders, Bukharin quickly became a person of interest to them. During this time, he became closely associated with Valerian Obolensky and Vladimir Smirnov. He also met his future first wife, Nadezhda Mikhailovna Lukina, his cousin and the sister of Nikolai Lukin, who was also a member of the party. They married in 1911, soon after returning from internal exile.

In 1911, after a brief imprisonment, Bukharin was exiled to Onega in Arkhangelsk, but he soon escaped to Hanover. He stayed in Germany for a year before visiting Kraków (Poland) in 1912 to meet Vladimir Lenin for the first time. During the exile, he continued his education and wrote several books that established him as a major Bolshevik theorist. His work Imperialism and World Economy was endorsed by Lenin. He and Lenin also often had hot disputes on theoretical issues, as well as Bukharin's closeness with the European Left and his anti-statist tendencies. Bukharin developed an interest in the works of Austrian Marxists and heterodox Marxist economic theorists, such as Aleksandr Bogdanov, who did not agree with Lenin.

In October 1916, while based in New York City, Bukharin edited the newspaper Novy Mir (New World) with Leon Trotsky and Alexandra Kollontai. When Trotsky arrived in New York in January 1917, Bukharin was the first of the émigrés to greet him. (Trotsky's wife recalled, "with a bear hug and immediately began to tell them about a public library which stayed open late at night and which he proposed to show us at once" dragging the tired Trotskys across town "to admire his great discovery").

== From 1917 to 1923 ==
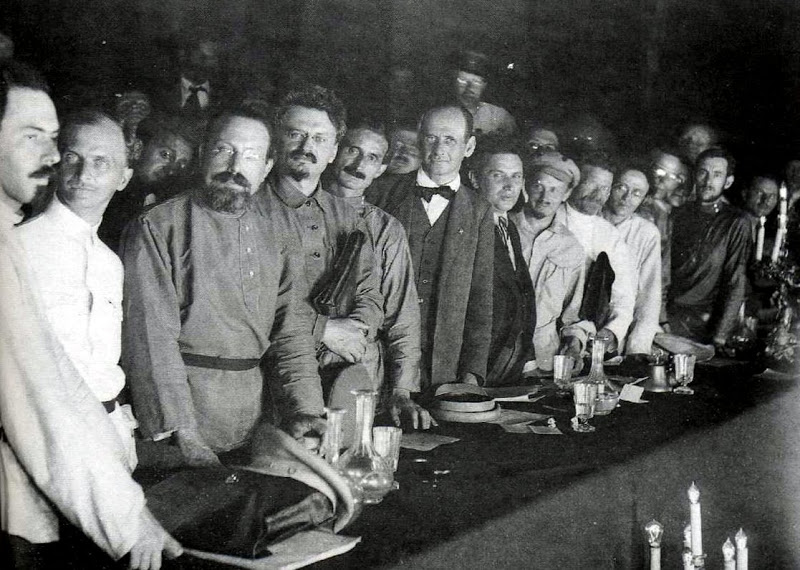
Delegates to the 2nd World Congress of the Comintern in Moscow, 1920. Left to right: Giacinto Serrati, Leon Trotsky, Alfred Rosmer, Paul Levi, Grigory Zinoviev, Nikolai Bukharin, Mikhail Kalinin, Karl Radek.

At the news of the Russian Revolution of February 1917, exiled revolutionaries from around the world began to flock back to the homeland. Trotsky left New York on 27 March 1917, sailing for St. Petersburg. Bukharin left New York in early April and returned to Russia by way of Japan (where he was temporarily detained by local police), arriving in Moscow in early May 1917. Politically, the Bolsheviks in Moscow were a minority in relation to the Mensheviks and the Socialist Revolutionaries. As more people began to be attracted to Lenin's promise to bring peace by withdrawing from the Great War, membership in the Bolshevik faction began to increase dramatically – from 24,000 members in February 1917 to 200,000 members in October 1917. Upon his return to Moscow, Bukharin resumed his seat on the Moscow City Committee and also became a member of the Moscow Regional Bureau of the party.

To complicate matters further, the Bolsheviks themselves were divided into a right wing and a left wing. The right-wing of the Bolsheviks, including Aleksei Rykov and Viktor Nogin, controlled the Moscow Committee, while the younger left-wing Bolsheviks, including Vladimir Smirnov, Valerian Osinsky, Georgii Lomov, Nikolay Yakovlev, Ivan Kizelshtein and Ivan Stukov, were members of the Moscow Regional Bureau. On 10 October 1917, Bukharin was elected to the Central Committee, along with two other Moscow Bolsheviks: Andrei Bubnov and Grigori Sokolnikov. This strong representation on the Central Committee was a direct recognition of the Moscow Bureau's increased importance. Whereas the Bolsheviks had previously been a minority in Moscow behind the Mensheviks and the Socialist Revolutionaries, by September 1917 the Bolsheviks were in the majority in Moscow. Furthermore, the Moscow Regional Bureau was formally responsible for the party organizations in each of the thirteen central provinces around Moscow – which accounted for 37% of the whole population of Russia and 20% of the Bolshevik membership.

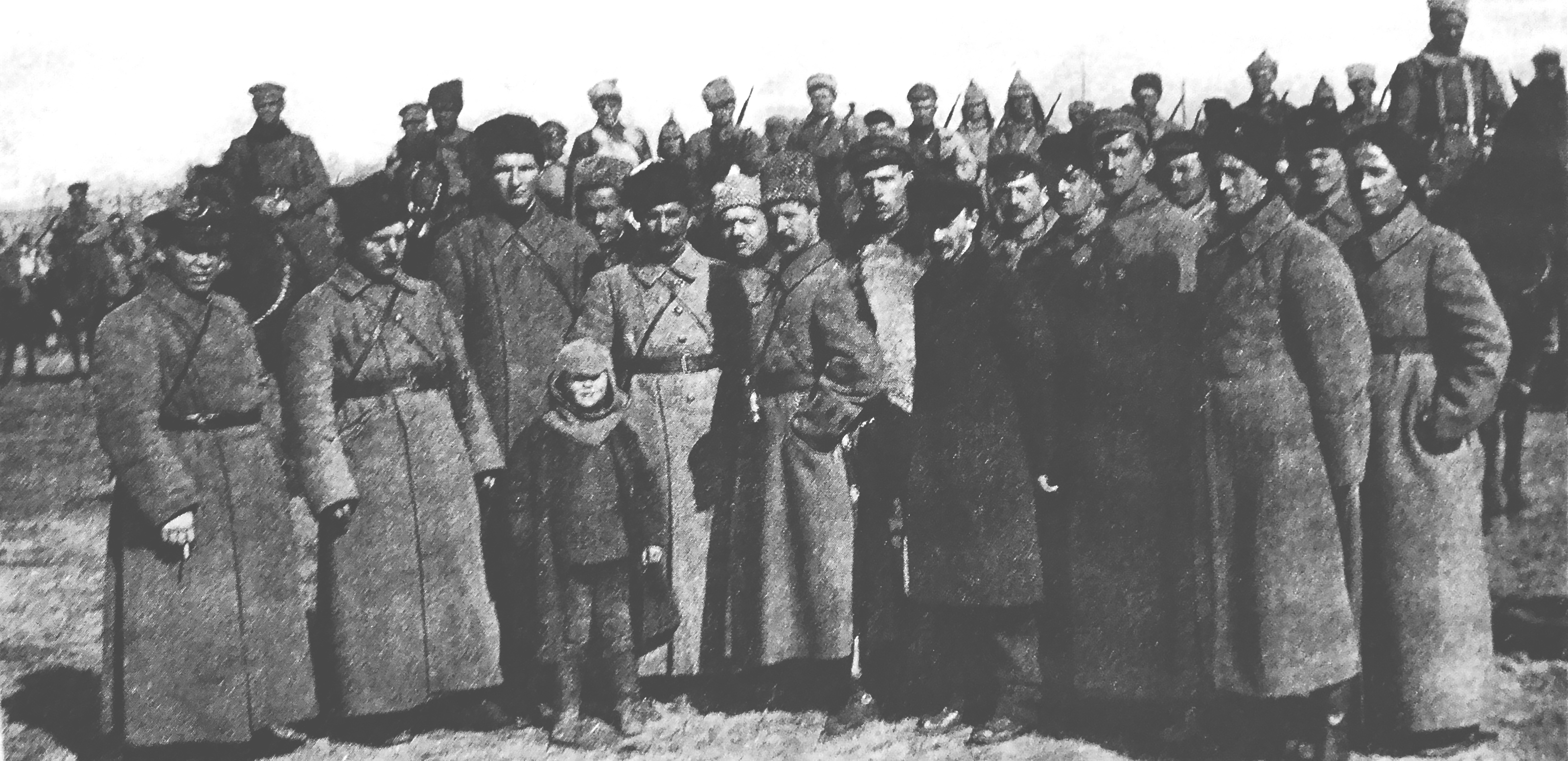
Kliment Voroshilov, Semyon Budyonny, Mikhail Frunze and Nikolai Bukharin in Novomoskovsk 1921 with the 1st Cavalry Army (Konarmia)

While no one dominated revolutionary politics in Moscow during the October Revolution as Trotsky did in St. Petersburg, Bukharin certainly was the most prominent leader in Moscow. During the October Revolution, Bukharin drafted, introduced, and defended the revolutionary decrees of the Moscow Soviet. Bukharin then represented the Moscow Soviet in their report to the revolutionary government in Petrograd. Following the October Revolution, Bukharin became the editor of the party's newspaper, Pravda.

Bukharin believed passionately in the promise of world revolution. In the Russian turmoil near the end of World War I, when a negotiated peace with the Central Powers was looming, he demanded a continuance of the war, fully expecting to incite all the foreign proletarian classes to arms. Even as he was uncompromising toward Russia's battlefield enemies, he also rejected any fraternization with the capitalist Allied powers: he reportedly wept when he learned of official negotiations for assistance. Bukharin emerged as the leader of the Left Communists in bitter opposition to Lenin's decision to sign the Treaty of Brest-Litovsk. In this wartime power struggle, Lenin's arrest had been seriously discussed by them and Left Socialist Revolutionaries in 1918. Bukharin revealed this in a Pravda article in 1924, and stated that it had been "a period when the party stood a hair from a split, and the whole country a hair from ruin".

After the ratification of the treaty, Bukharin resumed his responsibilities within the party. In March 1919, he became a member of the Comintern's executive committee and a candidate member of the Politburo. During the Civil War period, he published several theoretical economic works, including the popular primer The ABC of Communism (with Yevgeni Preobrazhensky, 1919), and the more academic Economics of the Transitional Period (1920) and Historical Materialism (1921).

By 1921, he changed his position and accepted Lenin's emphasis on the survival and strengthening of the Soviet state as the bastion of the future world revolution. He became the foremost supporter of the New Economic Policy (NEP), to which he was to tie his political fortunes. Considered by the Left Communists as a retreat from socialist policies, the NEP reintroduced money and allowed private ownership and capitalistic practices in agriculture, retail trade, and light industry while the state retained control of heavy industry.

== Power struggle ==
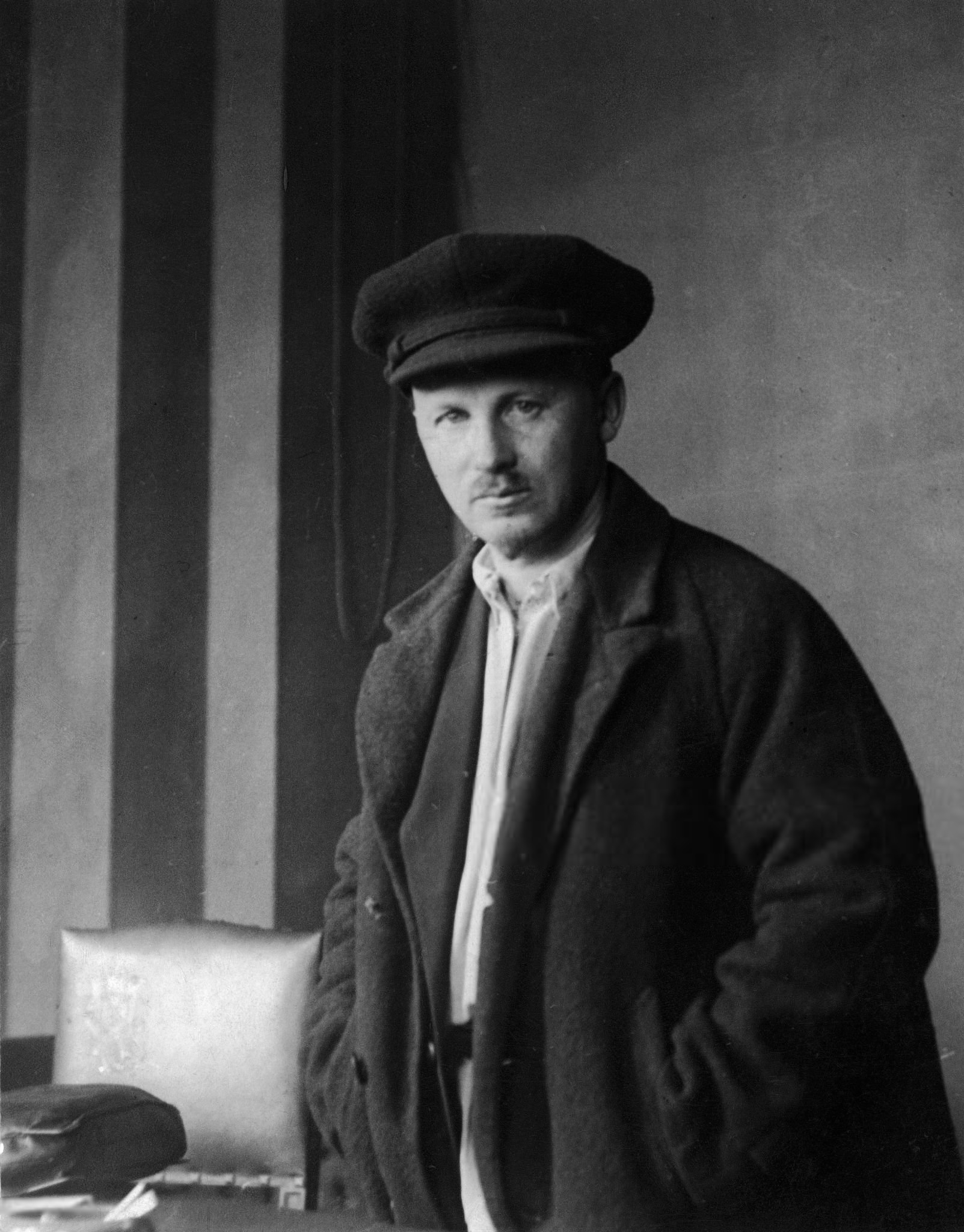
Bukharin c. 1920

After Lenin's death in 1924, Bukharin became a full member of the Politburo. In the subsequent power struggle among Leon Trotsky, Grigory Zinoviev, Lev Kamenev and Stalin, Bukharin allied himself with Stalin, who positioned himself as centrist of the Party and supported the NEP against the Left Opposition, which wanted more rapid industrialization, escalation of class struggle against the kulaks (wealthier peasants), and agitation for world revolution. It was Bukharin who formulated the thesis of "Socialism in One Country" put forth by Stalin in 1924, which argued that socialism (in Marxist–Leninist theory, the period of transition to communism) could be developed in a single country, even one as underdeveloped as Russia. This new theory stated that socialist gains could be consolidated in a single country, without that country relying on simultaneous successful revolutions across the world. The thesis would become a hallmark of Stalinism.

He is an unprincipled intriguer, who subordinates everything to the preservation of his own power. He changes his theory according to whom he needs to get rid of.

— Bukharin on Stalin's theoretical position, 1928.

Trotsky, the prime force behind the Left Opposition, was defeated by a triumvirate formed by Stalin, Zinoviev, and Kamenev, with the support of Bukharin. At the Fourteenth Party Congress in December 1925, Stalin openly attacked Kamenev and Zinoviev, revealing that they had asked for his aid in expelling Trotsky from the Party. By 1926, the Stalin-Bukharin alliance ousted Zinoviev and Kamenev from the Party leadership, and Bukharin enjoyed the highest degree of power during the 1926–1928 period. He emerged as the leader of the Party's right wing, which included two other Politburo members (Alexei Rykov, Lenin's successor as Chairman of the Council of People's Commissars and Mikhail Tomsky, head of trade unions) and he became General Secretary of the Comintern's executive committee in 1926. However, prompted by a grain shortage in 1928, Stalin reversed himself and proposed a program of rapid industrialization and forced collectivization because he believed that the NEP was not working fast enough. Stalin felt that in the new situation the policies of his former foes—Trotsky, Zinoviev, and Kamenev—were the right ones.

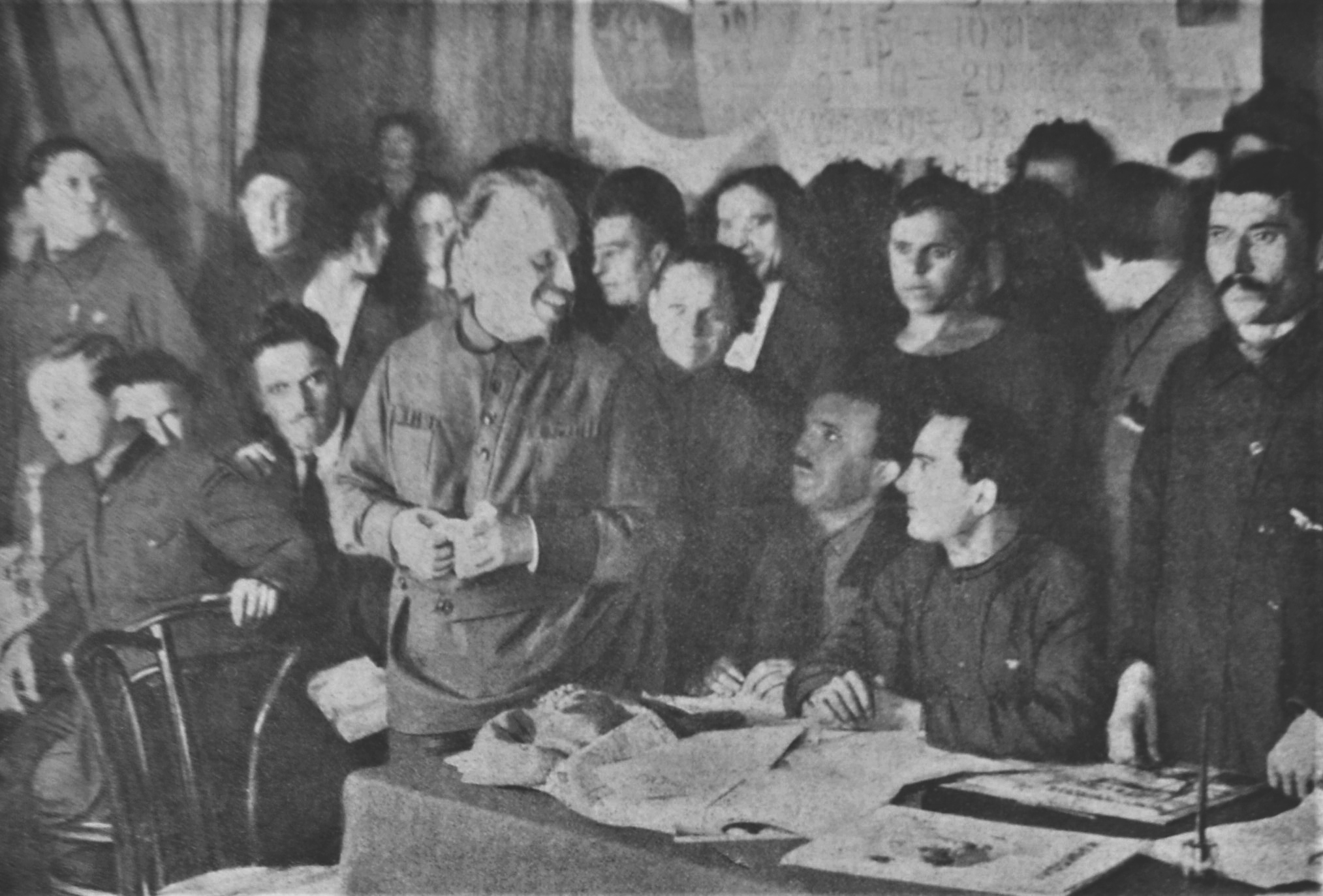
Nikolai Bukharin at the Congress of educators in 1925

Bukharin was worried by the prospect of Stalin's plan, which he feared would lead to "military-feudal exploitation" of the peasantry. Bukharin did want the Soviet Union to achieve industrialization but he preferred the more moderate approach of offering the peasants the opportunity to become prosperous, which would lead to greater grain production for sale abroad. Bukharin pressed his views throughout 1928 in meetings of the Politburo and at the Communist Party Congress, insisting that enforced grain requisition would be counterproductive, as War Communism had been a decade earlier.

== Fall from power ==
Bukharin's support for the continuation of the NEP was not popular with higher Party cadres, and his slogan to peasants, "Enrich yourselves!" and proposal to achieve socialism "at snail's pace" left him vulnerable to attacks first by Zinoviev and later by Stalin. Stalin attacked Bukharin's views, portraying them as capitalist deviations and declaring that the revolution would be at risk without a strong policy that encouraged rapid industrialization.

Having helped Stalin achieve unchecked power against the Left Opposition, Bukharin found himself easily outmaneuvered by Stalin. Yet Bukharin played to Stalin's strength by maintaining the appearance of unity within the Party leadership. Meanwhile, Stalin used his control of the Party machine to replace Bukharin's supporters in the Rightist power base in Moscow, trade unions, and the Comintern.

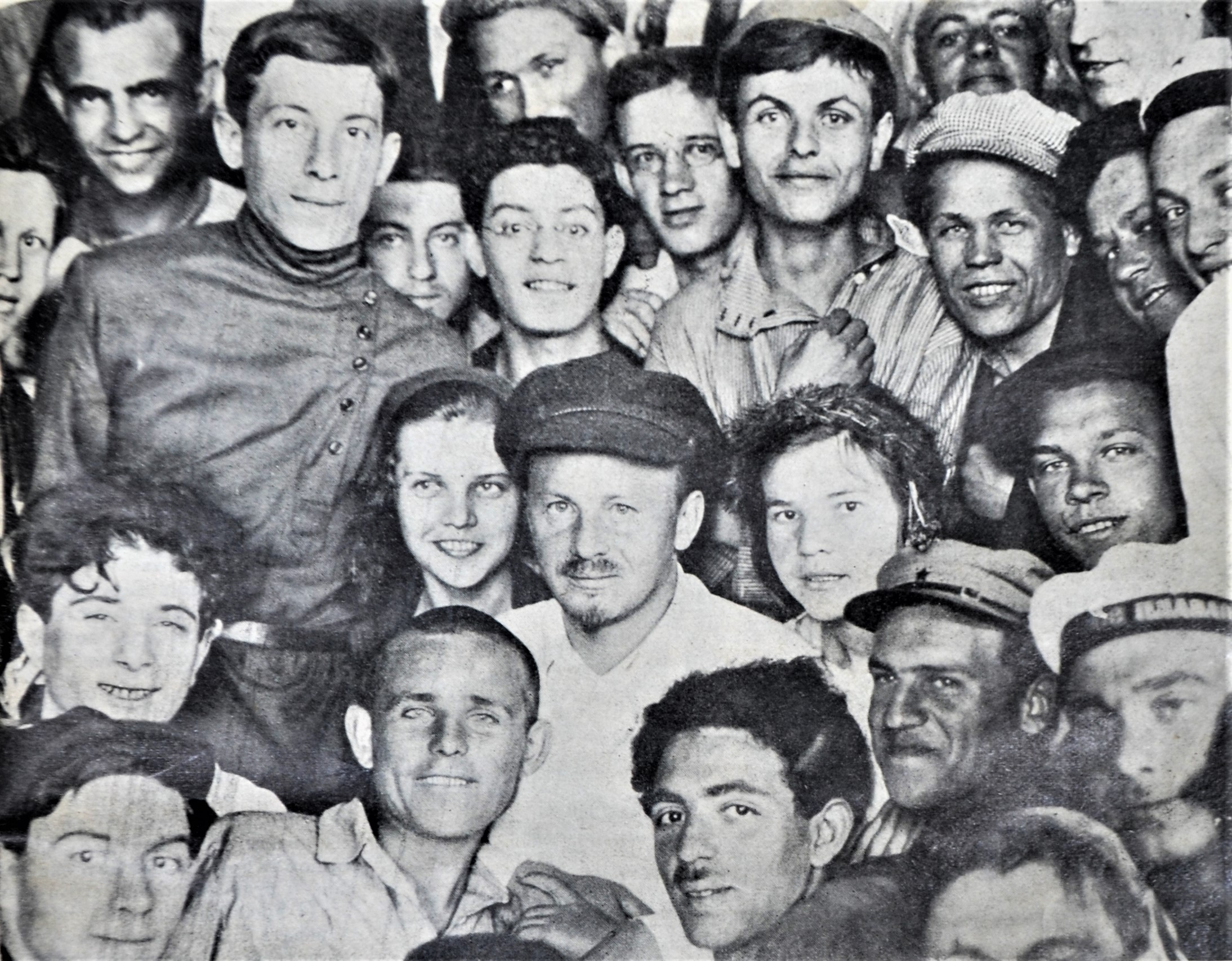
Nikolai Bukharin at the meeting of the workers and peasants news reporters in Moscow, June 1926

Bukharin attempted to gain support from earlier foes including Kamenev and Zinoviev who had fallen from power and held mid-level positions within the Communist party. The details of his meeting with Kamenev, to whom he confided that Stalin was "Genghis Khan" and changed policies to get rid of rivals, were leaked by the Trotskyist press and subjected him to accusations of factionalism. Jules Humbert-Droz, a former ally and friend of Bukharin, wrote that in spring 1929, Bukharin told him that he had made contact with the "Zinoviev-Kamenev faction", and that they were planning to use individual terror (assassination) to get rid of Stalin. Eventually, Bukharin lost his position in the Comintern and the editorship of Pravda in April 1929, and he was expelled from the Politburo on 17 November of that year.

Bukharin was forced to renounce his views under pressure. He wrote letters to Stalin pleading for forgiveness and rehabilitation, but through wiretaps of Bukharin's private conversations with Stalin's enemies, Stalin knew Bukharin's repentance was insincere.

International supporters of Bukharin, Jay Lovestone of the Communist Party USA among them, were also expelled from the Comintern. They formed an international alliance to promote their views, calling it the International Communist Opposition, though it became better known as the Right Opposition, after a term used by the Trotskyist Left Opposition in the Soviet Union to refer to Bukharin and his supporters there.

Even after his fall, Bukharin still did some important work for the Party. For example, he helped write the 1936 Soviet constitution, which he believed would guarantee real democratization. There is some evidence that Bukharin was thinking of evolution toward some kind of two-party or at least two-slate elections. Boris Nikolaevsky reported that Bukharin said: "A second party is necessary. If there is only one electoral list, without opposition, that's equivalent to Nazism." Grigory Tokaev, a Soviet defector and admirer of Bukharin, reported that: "Stalin aimed at one party dictatorship and complete centralisation. Bukharin envisaged several parties and even nationalist parties, and stood for the maximum of decentralisation."

== Friendship with Osip Mandelstam and Boris Pasternak ==
In the brief period of thaw in 1934–1936, Bukharin was politically rehabilitated and was made editor of Izvestia in 1934. There, he consistently highlighted the dangers of fascist regimes in Europe and the need for "proletarian humanism". One of his first decisions as editor was to invite Boris Pasternak to contribute to the newspaper and sit in on editorial meetings. Pasternak described Bukharin as "a wonderful, historically extraordinary man, but fate has not been kind to him". They first met during the lying-in-state of the Soviet police chief, Vyacheslav Menzhinsky in May 1934, when Pasternak was seeking help for his fellow poet, Osip Mandelstam, who had been arrested – though at that time neither Pasternak nor Bukharin knew why.

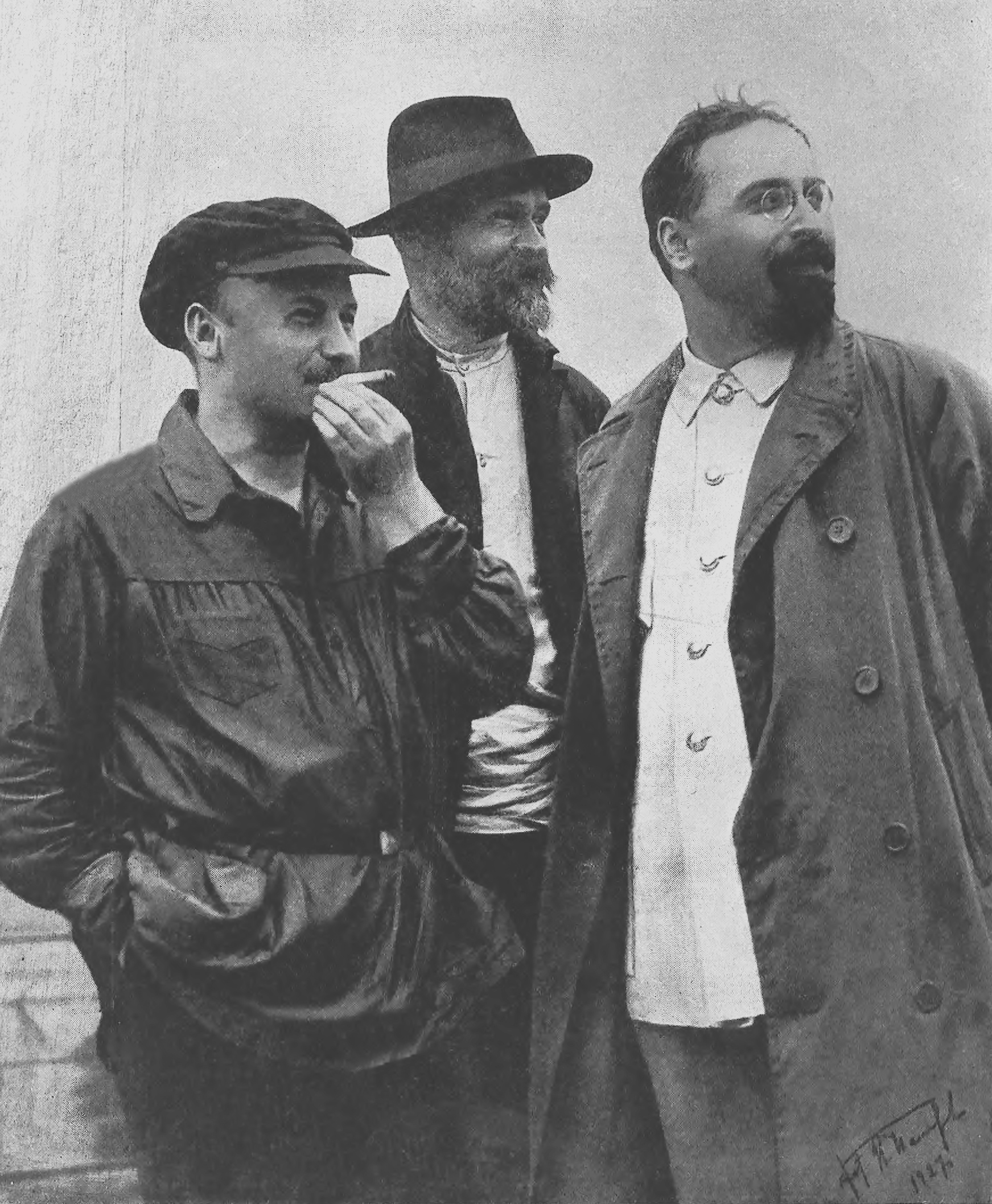
Old Bolsheviks: Nikolai Bukharin, the editor of Pravda and Projector. Ivan Skvortsov-Stepanov, the First People's Commissar (Minister) for Finance. Lev Karakhan, Deputy People's Commissar (Deputy Minister) for Foreign Affairs, the first Soviet Ambassador to China

Bukharin had acted as Mandelstam's political protector since 1922. According to Mandelstam's wife, Nadezhda, "M. owed him all the pleasant things in his life. His 1928 volume of poetry would never have come out without the active intervention of Bukharin. The journey to Armenia, our apartment and ration cards, contracts for future volumes – all this was arranged by Bukharin." Bukharin wrote to Stalin, pleading clemency for Mandelstam, and appealed personally to the head of the NKVD, Genrikh Yagoda. It was Yagoda who told him about Mandelstam's Stalin Epigram, after which he refused to have any further contact with Nadezhda Mandelstam, who had lied to him by denying that her husband had written "anything rash" – but continued to befriend Pasternak.

Soon after Mandelstam's arrest, Bukharin was delegated to prepare the official report on poetry for the First Soviet Writers' Congress, in August 1934. He could not any longer risk mentioning Mandelstam in his speech to the congress, but did devote a large section of his speech to Pasternak, whom he described as "remote from current affairs ... a singer of the old intelligentsia ... delicate and subtle ... a wounded and easily vulnerable soul. He is the embodiment of chaste but self-absorbed laboratory craftsmanship". His speech was greeted with wild applause, though it greatly offended some of the listeners, such as the communist poet Semyon Kirsanov, who complained: "according to Bukharin, all the poets who have used their verses to participate in political life are out of date, but the others are not out of date, the so-called pure (and not so pure) lyric poets".

When Bukharin was arrested two years later, Boris Pasternak displayed extraordinary courage by having a letter delivered to Bukharin's wife saying that he was convinced of his innocence.

== Increasing tensions with Stalin ==
Stalin's collectivization policy proved to be as disastrous as Bukharin predicted, but Stalin had by then achieved unchallenged authority in the party leadership. However, there were signs that moderates among Stalin's supporters sought to end official terror and bring a general change in policy, after mass collectivization was largely completed and the worst was over. Although Bukharin had not challenged Stalin since 1929, his former supporters, including Martemyan Ryutin, drafted and clandestinely circulated an anti-Stalin platform, which called Stalin the "evil genius of the Russian Revolution".

However, Sergey Kirov, First Secretary of the Leningrad Regional Committee, was assassinated in Leningrad in December 1934, and his death was used by Stalin as a pretext to launch the Great Purge, in which about 700,000 people were to perish as Stalin eliminated all past and potential opposition to his authority. Some historians believe that Kirov's assassination in 1934 was arranged by Stalin himself, despite the lack of evidence to plausibly posit such a conclusion. After Kirov's assassination, the NKVD charged an ever-growing group of former oppositionists with Kirov's murder and other acts of treason, terrorism, sabotage, and espionage.

== Great Purge ==
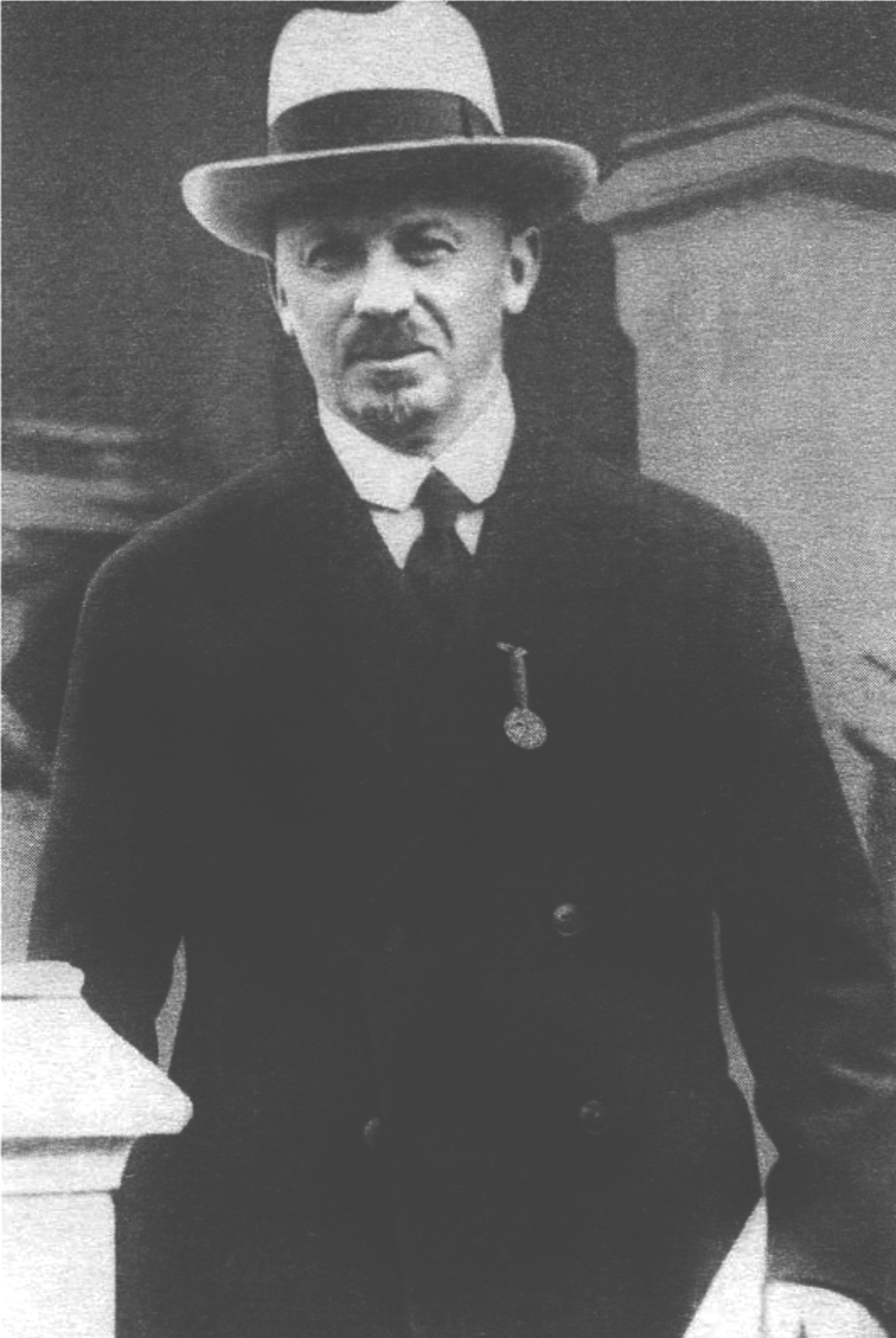
Bukharin in London, 1931

In February 1936, shortly before the purge started in earnest, Bukharin was sent to Paris by Stalin to negotiate the purchase of the Marx and Engels archives, held by the German Social Democratic Party (SPD) before its dissolution by Hitler. He was joined by his young wife Anna Larina, which therefore opened the possibility of exile, but he decided against it, saying that he could not live outside the Soviet Union.

Bukharin, who had been forced to follow the Party line since 1929, confided to his old friends and former opponents his real view of Stalin and his policy. His conversations with Boris Nicolaevsky, a Menshevik leader who held the manuscripts on behalf of the SPD, formed the basis of "Letter of an Old Bolshevik", which was very influential in contemporary understanding of the period (especially the Ryutin Affair and the Kirov murder), although there are doubts about its authenticity.

According to Nicolaevsky, Bukharin spoke of "the mass annihilation of completely defenseless men, with women and children" under forced collectivization and liquidation of kulaks as a class that dehumanized the Party members with "the profound psychological change in those communists who took part in the campaign. Instead of going mad, they accepted terror as a normal administrative method and regarded obedience to all orders from above as a supreme virtue. ... They are no longer human beings. They have truly become the cogs in a terrible machine."

Yet to another Menshevik leader, Fyodor Dan, he confided that Stalin became "the man to whom the Party granted its confidence" and "is a sort of a symbol of the Party" even though he "is not a man, but a devil". In Dan's account, Bukharin's acceptance of the Soviet Union's new direction was thus a result of his utter commitment to Party solidarity.

To his boyhood friend, Ilya Ehrenburg, he expressed the suspicion that the whole trip was a trap set up by Stalin. Indeed, his contacts with Mensheviks during this trip were to feature prominently in his trial.

== Trial ==
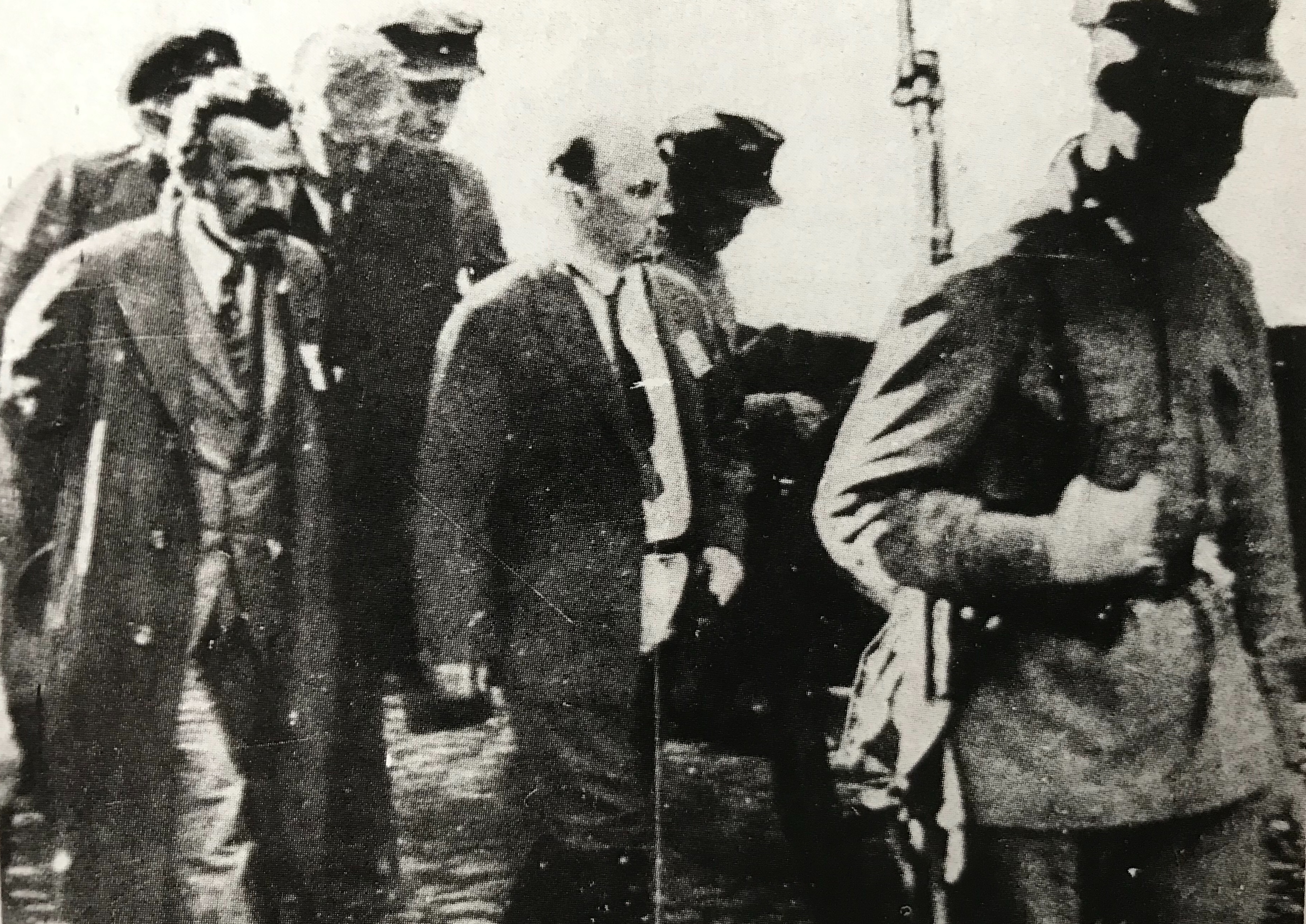
Bukharin and Rykov, shortly before the trial in 1938.

Stalin was for a long time undecided on Bukharin and Georgy Pyatakov. After receiving Nikolay Yezhov's written evidence denouncing Bukharin, Stalin declined to sanction his arrest. After the trial and execution of Zinoviev, Kamenev, and other leftist Old Bolsheviks in 1936, Bukharin and Rykov were arrested on 27 February 1937 following a plenum of the Central Committee, and were charged with conspiring to overthrow the Soviet state. Photostatic evidence shows that Stalin's first impulse was to simply exile Bukharin, without sending him to trial. In the end, Bukharin was killed, but according to historian Alec Nove, "the road to his demise was not a straight one".

Bukharin was tried in the Trial of the Twenty One on 2–13 March 1938 during the Great Purge, along with ex-premier Alexei Rykov, Christian Rakovsky, Nikolai Krestinsky, Genrikh Yagoda, and 16 other defendants alleged to belong to the so-called "Bloc of Rightists and Trotskyites". In a trial meant to be the culmination of previous show trials, it was alleged that Bukharin and others sought to assassinate Lenin and Stalin from 1918, murder Maxim Gorky by poison, partition the Soviet Union and hand out her territories to Germany, Japan, and Great Britain.

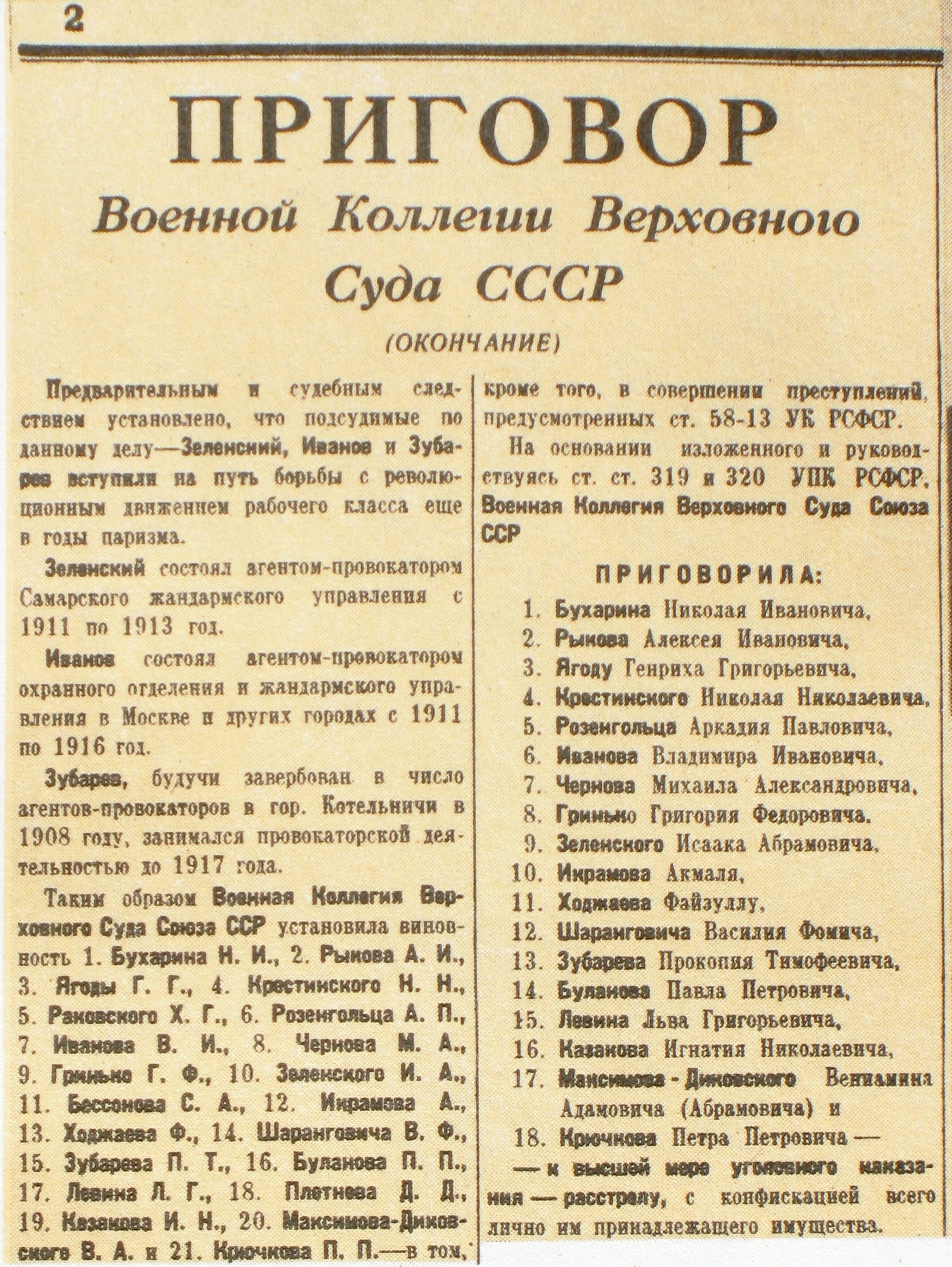
The verdict at the Trial of the Twenty-One.

Even more than earlier Moscow show trials, Bukharin's trial horrified many previously sympathetic observers as they watched allegations levelled against someone who had been so close to Stalin and Lenin. For some prominent Communists such as Bertram Wolfe, Jay Lovestone, Arthur Koestler, and Heinrich Brandler, the Bukharin trial marked their final break with Communism and even eventually turned the first three into passionate anti-Communists.

Bukharin wrote letters to Stalin while imprisoned, attempting without success to negotiate his innocence in the case of the alleged crimes, his eventual execution, and his hope for release:

If I'm to receive the death sentence, then I implore you beforehand, I entreat you, by all that you hold dear, not to have me shot. Let me drink poison in my cell instead (let me have morphine so that I can fall asleep and never wake up). For me, this point is extremely important. I don't know what words I should summon up in order to entreat you to grant me this as an act of charity. After all, politically, it won't really matter, and, besides, no one will know a thing about it. But let me spend my last moments as I wish. Have pity on me!

In his letter of 10 December 1937, Bukharin suggests becoming Stalin's tool against Trotsky, but there's no evidence Stalin ever seriously considered Bukharin's offer:

If, contrary to expectation, my life is to be spared, I would like to request (though I would first have to discuss it with my wife) the following:

- that I be exiled to America for x number of years. My arguments are: I would myself wage a campaign [in favour] of the trials, I would wage a mortal war against Trotsky, I would win over large segments of the wavering intelligentsia, I would in effect become Anti-Trotsky and would carry out this mission in a big way and, indeed, with much zeal. You could send an expert security officer [chekist] with me and, as added insurance, you could detain my wife here for six months until I have proven that I am really punching Trotsky and Company in the nose, etc.
- But if there is the slightest doubt in your mind, then exile me to a camp in Pechora or Kolyma, even for 25 years. I could set up there the following: a university, a museum of local culture, technical stations and so on, institutes, a painting gallery, an ethnographic museum, a zoological and botanical museum, a camp newspaper and journal.

While Anastas Mikoyan and Vyacheslav Molotov later claimed that Bukharin was never tortured and his letters from prison do not give the suggestion that he was tortured, it is also known that his interrogators were given the order: "beating permitted". Bukharin held out for three months, but threats to his young wife and infant son, combined with "methods of physical influence" wore him down. But when he read his confession amended and corrected personally by Stalin, he withdrew his whole confession. The examination started all over again, with a double team of interrogators.

Bukharin's confession and his motivation became subject of much debate among Western observers, inspiring Koestler's acclaimed novel Darkness at Noon and a philosophical essay by Maurice Merleau-Ponty in Humanism and Terror. His confessions were somewhat different from others in that while he pleaded guilty to the "sum total of crimes", he denied knowledge when it came to specific crimes. Some astute observers noted that he would allow only what was in the written confession and refuse to go any further.

There are several interpretations of Bukharin's motivations (besides being coerced) in the trial. Koestler and others viewed it as a true believer's last service to the Party (while preserving the little amount of personal honor left), whereas Bukharin biographer Stephen Cohen and Robert Tucker saw traces of Aesopian language, with which Bukharin sought to turn the tables into an anti-trial of Stalinism (while keeping his part of the bargain to save his family). While his letters to Stalin – he wrote 34 very emotional and desperate letters tearfully protesting his innocence and professing his loyalty – suggest a complete capitulation and acceptance of his role in the trial, it contrasts with his actual conduct in the trial. Bukharin himself speaks of his "peculiar duality of mind" in his last plea, which led to "semi-paralysis of the will" and Hegelian "unhappy consciousness", which likely stemmed not only from his knowledge of the ruinous reality of Stalinism (although of course he could not say so in the trial) but also of the impending threat of fascism.

The result was a curious mix of fulsome confessions (of being a "degenerate fascist" working for the "restoration of capitalism") and subtle criticisms of the trial. After disproving several charges against him (one observer noted that he "proceeded to demolish, or rather showed he could very easily demolish, the whole case") and saying that "the confession of the accused is not essential. The confession of the accused is a medieval principle of jurisprudence" in a trial that was solely based on confessions, he finished his last plea with the words:

... the monstrousness of my crime is immeasurable especially in the new stage of struggle of the U.S.S.R. May this trial be the last severe lesson, and may the great might of the U.S.S.R. become clear to all.

The state prosecutor, Andrey Vyshinsky, characterized Bukharin as an "accursed crossbreed of fox and pig" who supposedly committed a "whole nightmare of vile crimes".

While in prison, he wrote at least four book-length manuscripts including a lyrical autobiographical novel, How It All Began, a philosophical treatise, Philosophical Arabesques, a collection of poems, and Socialism and Its Culture – all of which were found in Stalin's archive and published in the 1990s.

== Execution ==
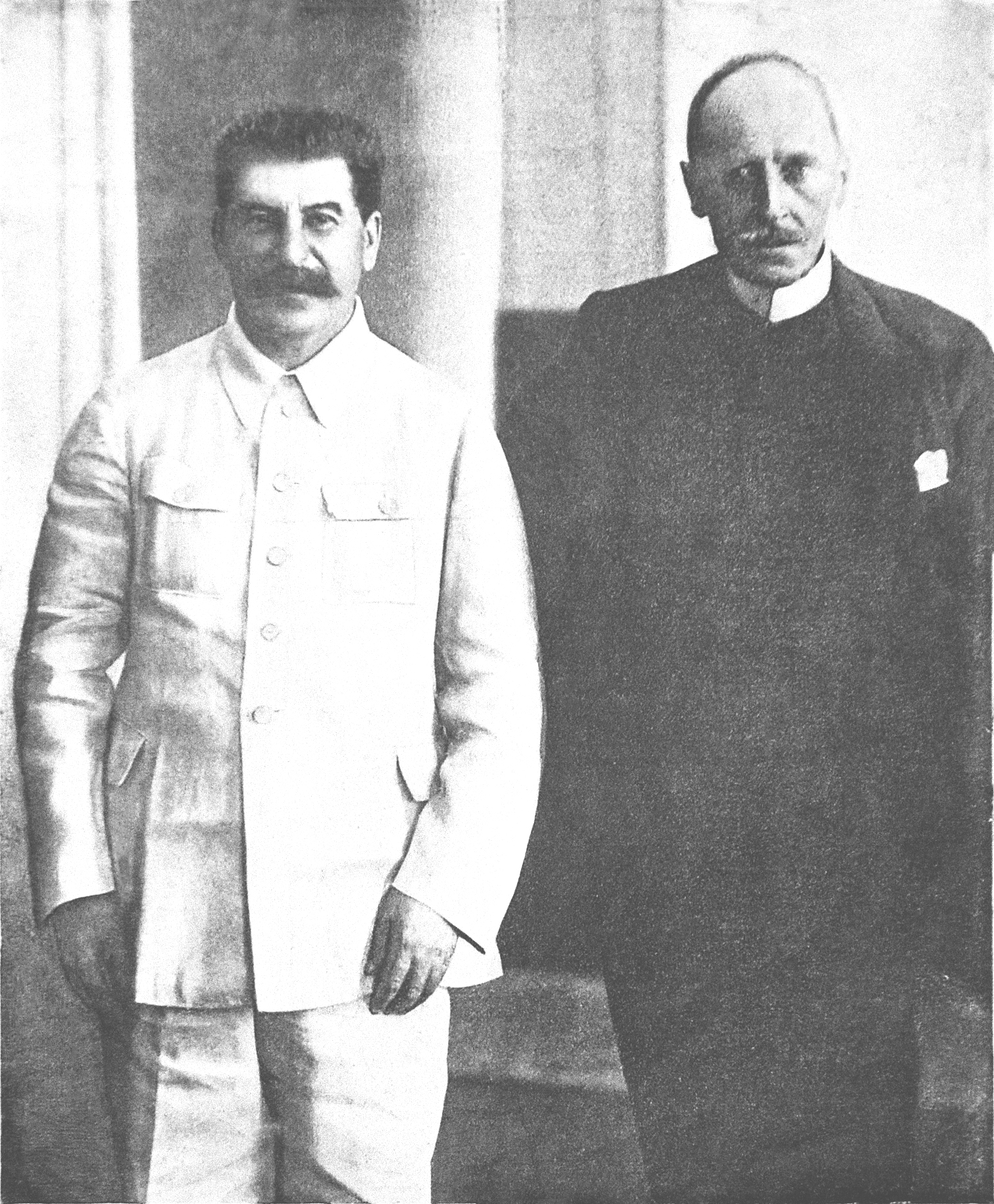
Joseph Stalin, General Secretary of the Communist Party and French author and Nobel laureate Romain Rolland, 1935

Among other intercessors, the French author and Nobel laureate Romain Rolland wrote to Stalin seeking clemency, arguing that "an intellect like that of Bukharin is a treasure for his country". He compared Bukharin's situation to that of the great chemist Antoine Lavoisier, who was guillotined during the French Revolution: "We in France, the most ardent revolutionaries ... still profoundly grieve and regret what we did. ... I beg you to show clemency." He had earlier written to Stalin in 1937, "For the sake of Gorky I am asking you for mercy, even if he may be guilty of something", to which Stalin noted: "We must not respond." Bukharin was executed on 15 March 1938 at the Kommunarka shooting ground, but the announcement of his death was overshadowed by the Nazi Anschluss of Austria.

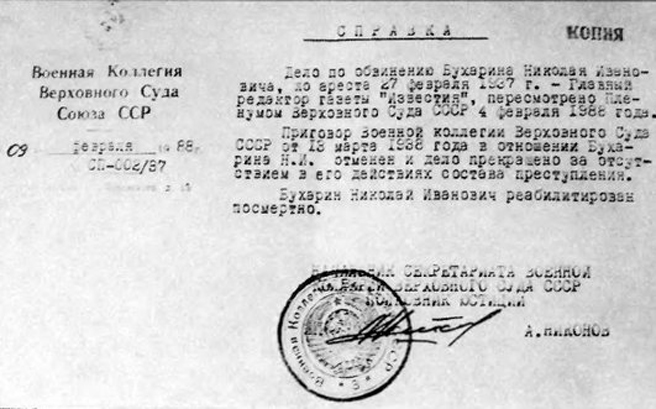
The act of rehabilitation of Bukharin

According to Zhores and Roy Medvedev in The Unknown Stalin (2006), Bukharin's last message to Stalin stated "Koba, why do you need me to die?", which was written in a note to Stalin just before his execution. "Koba" was Stalin's nom de guerre, and Bukharin's use of it was a sign of how close the two had once been. The note was allegedly found still in Stalin's desk after his death in 1953.

Despite the promise to spare his family, Bukharin's wife, Anna Larina, was sent to a labor camp, but she survived to see her husband officially rehabilitated by the Soviet state under Mikhail Gorbachev in 1988. Their son, Yuri Larin (born 1936), was sent to an orphanage in an attempt to keep him safe from the authorities, and also lived to see his rehabilitation. His first wife, Nadezhda, died in a labor camp after being arrested in 1938. His second wife, Esfir' Gurvich, and their daughter Svetlana Gurvich-Bukharina (1924-2003), were arrested in 1949, but survived past 1988, though they had lived in fear of the government their whole lives.

== Political stature and achievements ==
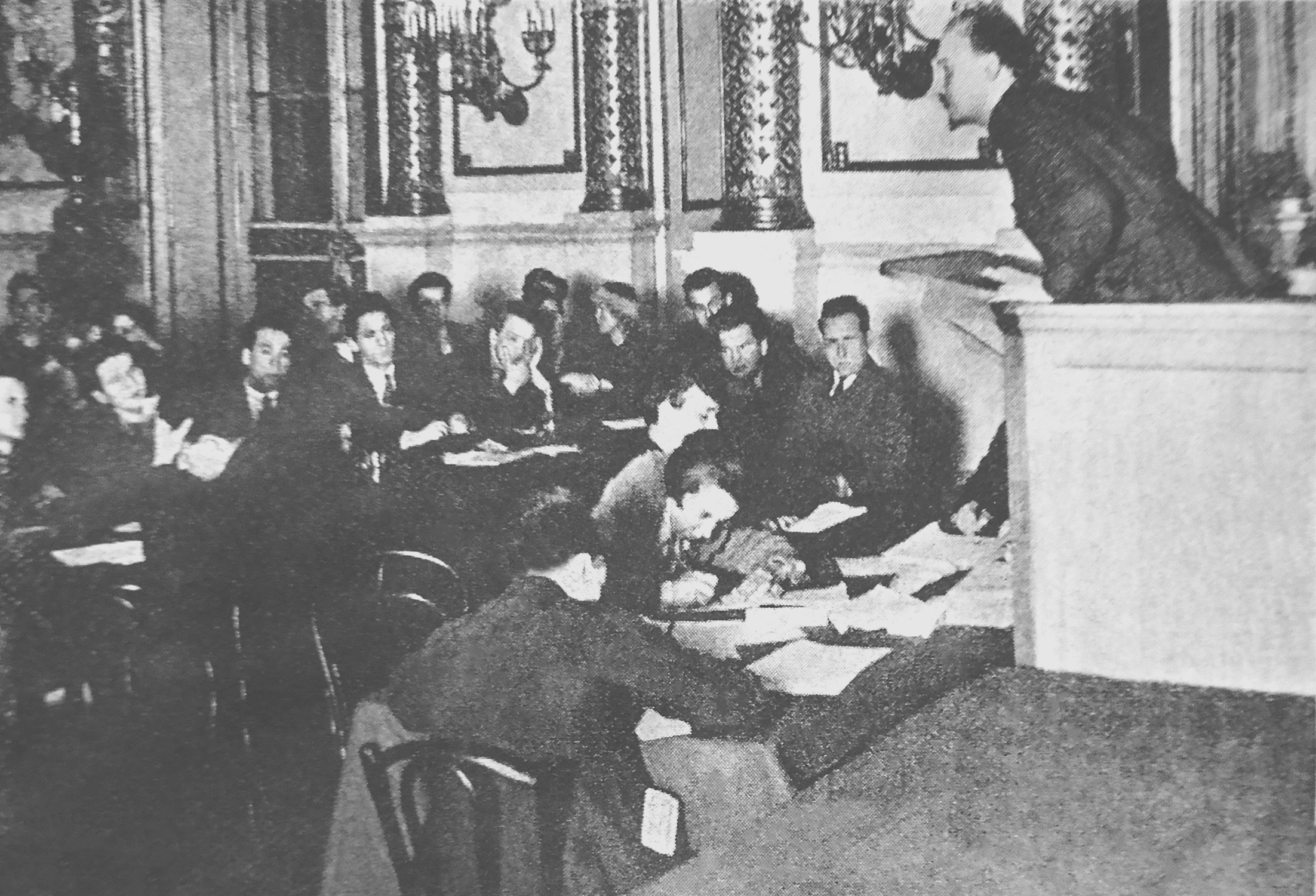
Bukharin delivers the welcome speech at the meeting of Young Communist International, 1925

Bukharin was immensely popular within the party throughout the twenties and thirties, even after his fall from power. In his testament, Lenin portrayed him as the Golden Boy of the party, writing:

Speaking of the young C.C. members, I wish to say a few words about Bukharin and Pyatakov. They are, in my opinion, the most outstanding figures (among the youngest ones), and the following must be borne in mind about them: Bukharin is not only a most valuable and major theorist of the Party; he is also rightly considered the favourite of the whole Party, but his theoretical views can be classified as fully Marxist only with great reserve, for there is something scholastic about him (he has never made a study of the dialectics, and, I think, never fully understood it) ... Both of these remarks, of course, are made only for the present, on the assumption that both these outstanding and devoted Party workers fail to find an occasion to enhance their knowledge and amend their one-sidedness.

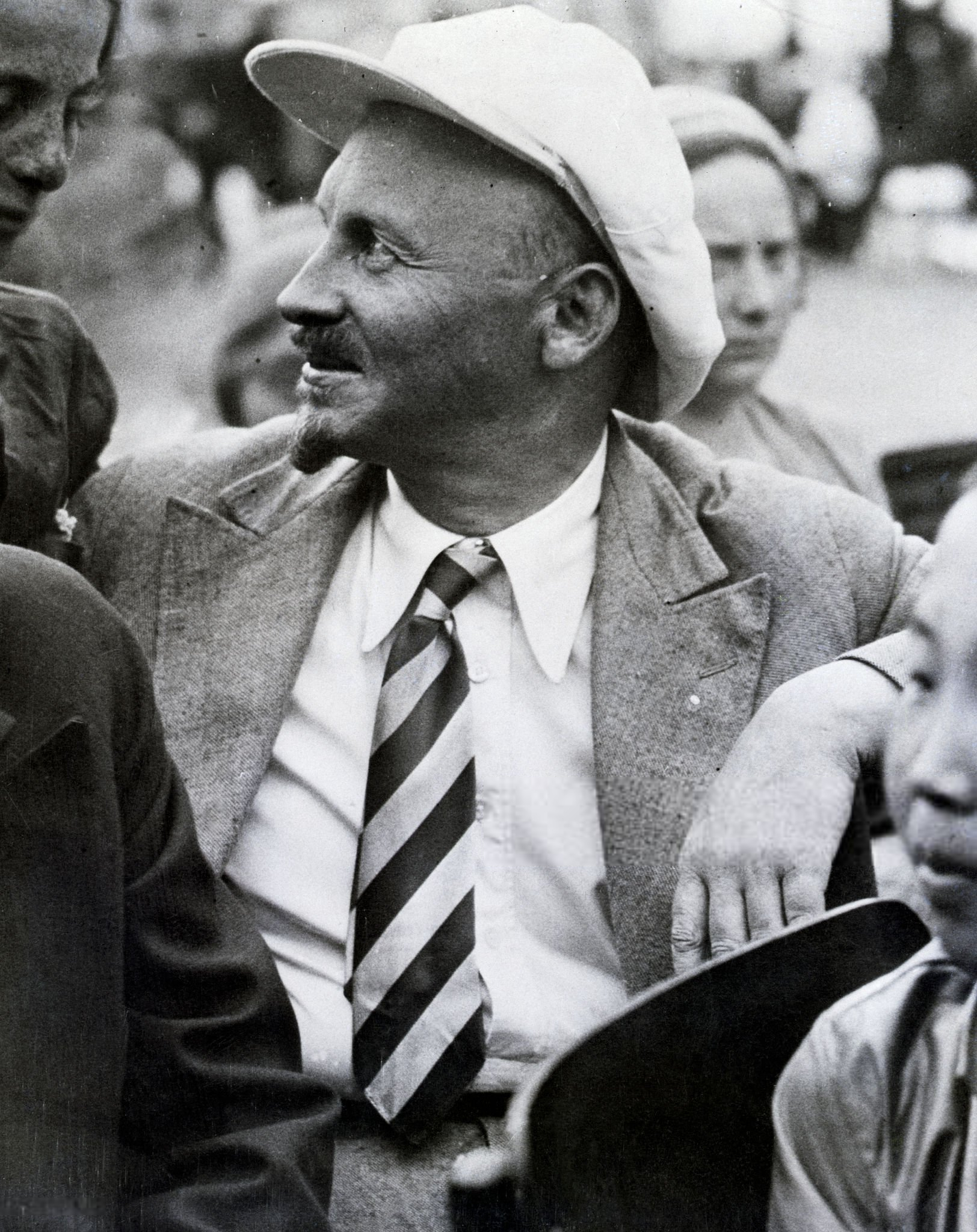
Bukharin in 1937, shortly after being removed from his post as editor of the government organ Izvestia

Bukharin made several notable contributions to Marxist–Leninist thought, most notably The Economics of the Transition Period (1920) and his prison writings, Philosophical Arabesques, as well as being a founding member of the Soviet Academy of Arts and Sciences, and a keen botanist. His primary contributions to economics were his critique of marginal utility theory, his analysis of imperialism, and his writings on the transition to communism in the Soviet Union.

Bukharin alongside Trotsky have been viewed by some scholars as representing political alternatives to Stalinism, in part, due to their de facto leadership of the Right Opposition and Left Opposition which was at variance with Stalin. These core differences ranged from areas related to economics, foreign policy and cultural matters.

His ideas, especially in economics and the question of market socialism, known as Bukharinism, later became highly influential in the Chinese socialist market economy and Deng Xiaoping's reform and opening up.

British author Martin Amis argues that Bukharin was perhaps the only major Bolshevik to acknowledge "moral hesitation" by questioning, even in passing, the violence and sweeping reforms of the early Soviet Union. Amis writes that Bukharin said "during the Civil War he had seen 'things that I would not want even my enemies to see'".

== Works ==
=== Books and articles ===
- 1915: Toward a Theory of the Imperialist State
- 1917: Imperialism and World Economy
- 1917: The Russian Revolution and Its Significance
- 1918: Anarchy and Scientific Communism
- 1918: Programme of the World Revolution
- 1919: Economic Theory of the Leisure Class (written 1914)
- 1919: Church and School in the Soviet Republic
- 1919: The Red Army and the Counter Revolution
- 1919: Soviets or Parliament
- 1920: The ABC of Communism (with Yevgeni Preobrazhensky)
- 1920: On Parliamentarism
- 1920: The Secret of the League (Part I)
- 1920: The Secret of the League (Part II)
- 1920: The Organisation of the Army and the Structure of Society
- 1920: Common Work for the Common Pot
- 1921: The Era of Great Works
- 1921: The New Economic Policy of Soviet Russia
- 1921: Historical Materialism: A System of Sociology
- 1922: Economic Organization in Soviet Russia
- 1923: A Great Marxian Party
- 1923: The Twelfth Congress of the Russian Communist Party
- 1924: Imperialism and the Accumulation of Capital
- 1924: The Theory of Permanent Revolution
- 1926: Building Up Socialism
- 1926: The Tasks of the Russian Communist Party
- 1927: The World Revolution and the U.S.S.R.
- 1928: New Forms of the World Crisis
- 1929: Notes of an Economist
- 1930: Finance Capital in Papal Robes. A Challenge!
- 1931: Theory and Practice from the Standpoint of Dialectical Materialism
- 1933: Marx's Teaching and Its Historical Importance
- 1934: Poetry, Poetics and the Problems of Poetry in the U.S.S.R.
- 1937: Socialism and Its Culture, written in prison, published posthumously.
- 1937: The Transformation of the World, poetry collection. Written in prison, published posthumously.
- 1937: Philosophical Arabesques, written in prison, published posthumously.
- 1937–1938: How It All Began, a largely autobiographical novel, written in prison and first published in English in 1998.

=== Cartoons ===
Bukharin was a cartoonist who left many cartoons of contemporary Soviet politicians. The renowned artist Konstantin Yuon once told him: "Forget about politics. There is no future in politics for you. Painting is your real calling." His cartoons are sometimes used to illustrate the biographies of Soviet officials. Russian historian Yury Zhukov stated that Nikolai Bukharin's portraits of Joseph Stalin were the only ones drawn from the original, not from a photograph.

== See also ==
- Outline of the Russian Revolution and Civil War
- Bibliography of the Russian Revolution and Civil War
- Bibliography of Stalinism and the Soviet Union
- Index of Old Bolsheviks
- Index of articles related to the Russian Revolution and Civil War

== Sources ==
- Bergmann, Theodor, and Moshe Lewin, eds. Bukharin in retrospect (Routledge, 2017).
- Biggart, John. "Bukharin and the origins of the 'proletarian culture' debate". Soviet Studies 39.2 (1987): 229–246.
- Biggart, John. "Bukharin's Theory of Cultural Revolution" in: Anthony Kemp-Welch (Ed.), The Ideas of Nikolai Bukharin. Oxford: Clarendon Press (1992), 131–158.
- Coates, Ken (2010). Who Was This Bukharin?. Nottingham: Spokesman. ISBN 978-0-85124-781-6.
- Cohen, Stephen F. (1980). Bukharin and the Bolshevik Revolution: A Political Biography, 1888–1938. Oxford University Press. ISBN 0-19-502697-7.
- Gregory, Paul R. (2010). Politics, Murder, and Love in Stalin's Kremlin: The Story of Nikolai Bukharin and Anna Larina. Stanford: Hoover Institution Press. ISBN 978-0-8179-1034-1.
- Kotkin, Stephen (2014). Stalin: Volume 1: The Paradoxes of Power, 1878–1928.
- Littlejohn, Gary. "State, plan and market in the transition to socialism: the legacy of Bukharin". Economy and Society 8.2 (1979): 206–239.
- Service, Robert (2004). Stalin: A Biography. Pan Books. ISBN 0-330-41913-7.
- Smith, Keith. "Introduction to Bukharin: economic theory and the closure of the Soviet industrialisation debate". Economy and Society 8.4 (1979): 446–472.
- A. Andreev; D. Tsygankov, eds. (2010). Imperial Moscow University: 1755–1917: encyclopedic dictionary. Moscow: Russian political encyclopedia (ROSSPEN). pp. 108–109. ISBN 978-5-8243-1429-8.

=== Primary sources ===
- Bukharin, Nikolaĭ, and Evgeniĭ Alekseevich Preobrazhenskiĭ. ABC of Communism (Socialist Labour Press, 1921). online
  - Fitzpatrick, Sheila. "The ABC of Communism Revisited". Studies in East European Thought 70.2–3 (2018): 167–179.
- Bukharin, Nikolaĭ Ivanovich. Selected Writings on the State and the Transition to Socialism (M. E. Sharpe, 1982).
