= The Declaration of 46 =

1923 secret letter from leading Soviet communists to the Soviet Politburo

The Declaration of 46 (Russian: Декларация сорока шести, romanized: Deklaratsiya soroka shesti) was a secret letter sent by a group of 46 leading Soviet communists to the Politburo of the Central Committee of the Communist Party of the Soviet Union on 15 October 1923. The declaration followed Leon Trotsky's letter, which was sent to the Politburo on 8 October and expressed similar concerns and thus laying the foundation for the Left Opposition within the Communist Party of the Soviet Union later that year. The signatories had pointed to issues with the party ban and also called for a review of the factional ban introduced in the Tenth Congress through a party conference. The vast majority of the signatories were executed during the Great Purge.

== Background ==
Starting in mid-summer 1923, the Soviet economy ran into significant difficulties arising from the scissor crisis, which led to numerous strikes countrywide. Two secret groups within the Communist Party, Workers' Truth and Workers' Group, were uncovered and suppressed by the Soviet secret police.

In September to October 1923, the much anticipated communist revolution in Germany ended in defeat.

On 8 October 1923, Trotsky sent a letter to the Central Committee and the Central Control Commission which attributed the difficulties to the lack of intraparty democracy. Trotsky wrote:

In the fiercest moment of War Communism, the system of appointment within the party did not have one tenth of the extent that it has now. Appointment of the secretaries of provincial committees is now the rule. That creates for the secretary a position essentially independent of the local organization. [...] The bureaucratization of the party apparatus has developed to unheard-of proportions by means of the method of secretarial selection. There has been created a very broad stratum of party workers, entering into the apparatus of the government of the party, who completely renounce their own party opinion, at least the open expression of it, as though assuming that the secretarial hierarchy is the apparatus which creates party opinion and party decisions. Beneath this stratum, abstaining from their own opinions, there lies the broad mass of the party, before whom every decision stands in the form of a summons or a command.

One week later, the Declaration of 46 followed.

== Text ==
"Declaration of the 46" to the Politburo of the CC RCP(b)

15 October 1923

Top Secret

TO THE POLITBURO OF THE CC OF THE RCP(b)

The extreme seriousness of the situation forces us (in the interests of our party, in the interests of the working class) to tell you openly that continuation of the policy of the majority of the Politburo threatens the entire party with grave misfortune. The economic and financial crisis beginning at the end of July this year, with all the political consequences flowing from it, including those within the party, has mercilessly revealed the inadequacy of the party leadership, both in the economic realm, and especially in the area of inner-party relations.

The haphazard, poorly thought through, and unsystematic decisions of the CC, which hasn't made ends meet in the economy, have led to a situation where, given the presence of undoubtedly major successes in the realm of industry, agriculture, finances and transport, - successes which were achieved by the economy of the nation spontaneously, not thanks to but in spite of the inadequate leadership, or, to be more precise, the absence of any leadership, - we are faced not only with the perspective of the halting of these successes, but with a severe crisis of the economy as a whole.

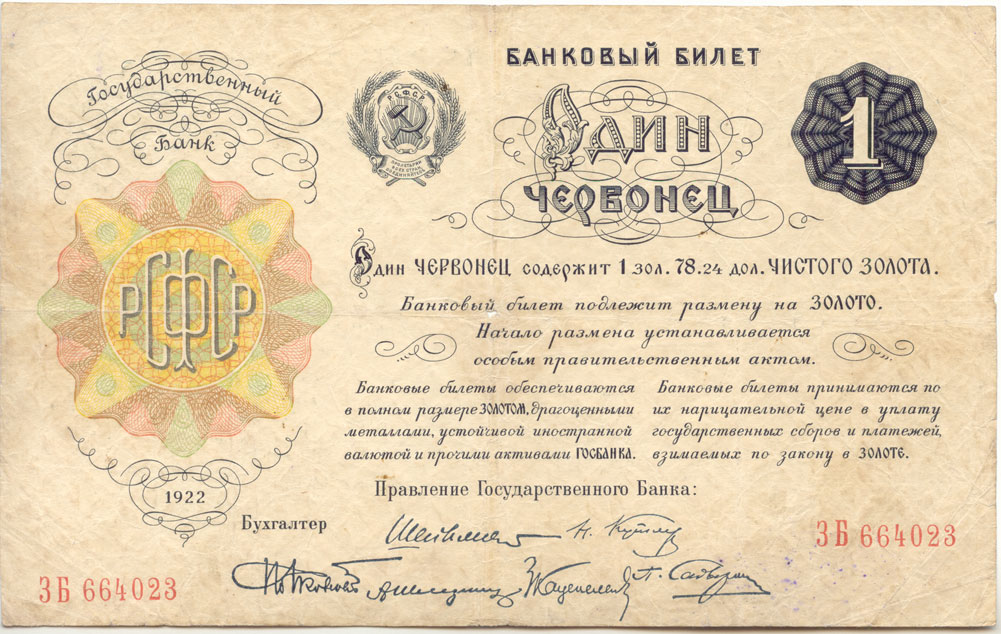
Chervonets 1922

We stand before the approaching break-down of the chervonets currency, which spontaneously turned into the basic currency before the liquidation of the budget deficit; we face a credit crisis in which the State Bank cannot, without the risk of severe shocks, finance not only industry and the trade of industrial goods, but even the purchase of grain for export; we face the cessation of the sale of industrial goods because of high prices, which can be explained, on the one hand, by the complete absence of planned, organizational leadership in industry, and on the other, by incorrect credit policy; we face the impossibility of carrying out the grain export program because of the inability to purchase grain; we face extremely low prices for food products, which are ruinous for the peasantry and which threaten massive cutbacks in agricultural production; we face the interruption of wage payments, which evokes the natural dissatisfaction of the workers; we face budget chaos, which directly creates chaos in the government apparatus; "revolutionary" means of cutbacks in drawing up the budget and new, unplanned cutbacks during its realization have gone from being temporary measures to a permanent phenomenon, which relentlessly jolts the state apparatus and, as a result of the absence of planning in the cutbacks - causes accidental and spontaneous shocks to it.

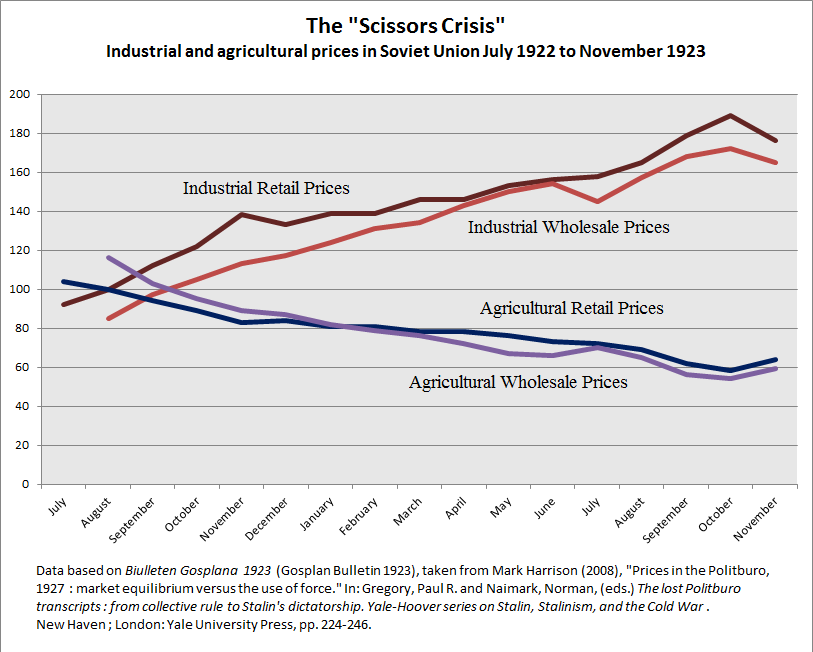
The Scissors: retail and wholesale prices of agricultural and industrial goods in the Soviet Union July 1922 to November 1923.

All these are elements of an economic, credit and financial crisis which has already begun. If we do not immediately take extensive, well thought out, planned and energetic measures, if the present lack of leadership continues, we face the possibility of unusually sharp economic shocks, inevitably bound up with domestic political complications and with the complete paralysis of our foreign activity and capability. And the latter, as everyone understands, is now more necessary than ever before; upon it depends the fate of the world revolution and the working class of all countries.

In precisely the same way, we see in the realm of inner-party relations the same incorrect leadership, paralyzing and demoralizing the party, which is particularly clearly felt during the crisis we are passing through.

We explain this not by the political incapability of the present party leaders; on the contrary, no matter how much we differ with them in evaluating the situation and in choosing the methods to change it, we think that today's leaders under any conditions couldn't help but be appointed by the party to leading posts in the workers' dictatorship. Rather we explain it by the fact that, under the guise of official unity, we actually have a one-sided selection of personnel, who can adapt to the views and sympathies of a narrow circle, and a one-sided direction of activity. As a result of the party leadership being distorted by such narrow considerations, the party has to a significant degree ceased to be that living, independent collective which is sensitive to the changes in living reality, precisely because it is connected with thousands of threads to this reality. Instead of this, we observe an ever progressing, barely disguised division of the party into a secretarial hierarchy and into "laymen", into professional party functionaries, chosen from above, and the other party masses, who take no part in social life.

This is a fact which is well known to every member of the party. Members of the party who are dissatisfied with this or that directive from the CC or even a provincial committee, or who are plagued by doubts, or who have noted "to themselves" various mistakes, things out of line or disorder of some sort, are afraid to speak about it at party gatherings; even worse, they are afraid to talk to one another unless they consider their interlocutor to be absolutely reliable, in the sense of not being "talkative"; free discussion within the party has virtually disappeared, party public opinion has been stifled. Now it is not the party, it is not the party's broad masses who nominate and choose provincial conferences and party congresses, which in turn nominate and choose provincial committees and the Central Committee of the RCP. On the contrary, it is the secretarial hierarchy, the party hierarchy which to an ever greater degree chooses the delegates to the conferences and congresses, which to an ever greater degree are becoming the executive conferences of this hierarchy. The regime which has been established within the party is absolutely intolerable; it is killing the independence of the party, replacing the party with a selected bureaucratic apparatus which functions smoothly during normal times, but which inevitably misfires during moments of crisis, and which threatens to become absolutely helpless when confronted with the serious events which lie ahead.

The situation which has developed is explained by the fact that the regime of fractional dictatorship within the party which unfolded after the Xth Congress has outlived itself. Many of us consciously chose not to resist such a regime. The about-face of 1921, followed by Lenin's illness, demanded, as far as some of us were concerned, a dictatorship within the party as a temporary measure. Other comrades from the very beginning reacted to it skeptically or opposed it. In any case, by the XIIth Party Congress this regime had become obsolete. It began to show the other side of the coin. The inner-party bonds began to weaken. The party began to wither. Extreme oppositional, even openly unhealthy, tendencies within the party began to take on an anti-party character, for there was no inner-party, comradely discussion of the most acute questions. And such a discussion could have revealed, without any difficulty, the unhealthy character of these tendencies, both to the party masses, and to the majority of their participants. As a result, we have seen the formation of illegal groupings, which draw party members away from the party, and we have witnessed the party losing contact with the working masses.

If the situation which has developed is not radically changed in the very near future, the economic crisis in Soviet Russia and the crisis of the fractional dictatorship within the party will strike heavy blows to the workers' dictatorship in Russia and to the Russian Communist Party. With such a burden on its shoulders, the dictatorship of the proletariat in Russia, and its leader, the RCP, cannot enter the field of the impending new international shocks in any other way than with the perspective of failure along the entire front of proletarian struggle. Of course, it would at first glance be easiest of all to resolve the question in the following sense: in view of the situation, there is not and there cannot be any place now for raising the questions of changing the party's course, of placing on the agenda new and complex tasks, etc., etc. But it is absolutely clear that such a point of view would be a position of officially closing one's eyes to the actual situation, since the entire danger lies in the fact that there is no genuine ideological or practical unity in the face of exceedingly complex domestic and foreign situations. In the party, the more silently and secretly the struggle is waged, the more ferocious it becomes. If we raise this question before the Central Committee, then it is precisely in order to find the swiftest and most painless resolution of the contradictions which are tearing the party apart, and to rapidly place the party on healthy foundations. We need real unity in discussions and in actions. The impending ordeals require the unanimous, fraternal, absolutely conscious, extremely energetic, and extremely unified activity of all the members of our party.

The fractional regime must be eliminated, and this must be done first of all by those who have created it; it must be replaced by a regime of comradely unity and inner-party democracy.

In order to realize all that has been outlined above, and to take the necessary measures to extricate ourselves from the economic, political and party crisis, we propose that the CC, as a first and most urgent step, call a conference of members of the CC with the most prominent and active party cadres, in order that the list of those invited include a number of comrades who have views concerning the situation which differ from the views of the majority of the CC.

- E. Preobrazhensky
- B. Breslav
- L. Serebriakov

While not agreeing with certain points in this letter explaining the causes of the situation which has developed, and feeling that the party has come up against problems which cannot fully be resolved by the methods employed up until now, I fully endorse the final conclusion of the present letter.

- A. Beloborodov 11 October 1923

I am in complete agreement with the proposals, although I differ with several points concerning motives.

- A. Rosengolts
- M. Alsky

In general, I share the thoughts of this appeal. The need for a direct and open approach to all our sore points is so overdue, that I fully support the proposal to call the indicated conference, in order to choose the practical ways capable of leading us out of the accumulated difficulties.

- Antonov-Ovseenko
- A. Venediktov
- I. N. Smirnov
- G. Piatakov
- V. Obolensky (Osinsky)
- N. Muralov
- T. Sapronov
- A. Goltsman

The situation in the party and the international situation are such that they demand the extraordinary concentration and unity of party forces more than ever before. While ascribing to the declaration, I view it exclusively as an attempt to create unity in the party and to prepare it for upcoming events. Naturally, at the present moment there can be no talk of inner-party struggle in any form whatsoever. It is necessary for the CC to soberly assess the situation and to adopt urgent measures to eliminate dissatisfaction within the party, as well as within the non-party masses.

- 12 October 1923. A. Goltsman
- 11 October 1923. V. Maksimovsky
- L. Sosnovsky
- Danishevsky
- P. Mesyatsev
- G. Khorechko

I do not agree with a number of assessments in the first part of the declaration; I do not agree with a number of characterizations of the inner-party situation. At the same time I am deeply convinced that the state of the party demands the adopting of radical measures, for things are not well in the party at the present time. I fully share the practical proposal.

- A. Bubnov 11 October 1923
- A. Voronsky
- V. Smirnov
- E. Bosh
- I. Byk
- V. Kosior
- F. Lokatskov

I am in complete agreement with the evaluation of the economic situation. I consider the weakening of the political dictatorship at the present moment to be dangerous, but things must be aired out. I find a conference to be absolutely necessary.

- Kaganovich
- Drobnis
- P. Kovalenko
- A. E. Minkin
- V. Yakovleva

I am in complete agreement with the practical proposals.

- B. Eltsin

I sign with the same reservations as comrade Bubnov.

- M. Levitin

I sign with the same reservations as Bubnov, sharing neither the form, nor the tone, which all the more convinces me to agree with the practical part of the given declaration.

- I. Poliudov
- O. Shmidel
- V. Ter-Vaganyan
- I. Stukov
- A. Lobanov
- R. Farbman
- S. Vasilchenko
- Mikh. Zhakov
- A. Puzakov
- N. Nikolaev

Since during recent times I have been somewhat removed from the work of the party centers, I abstain from the judgements of the two leading paragraphs of the introductory part; I agree with the rest.

- Averin

I am in agreement with the part outlining the economic and political situation of the country. I feel that in the part which depicts the inner-party situation, a certain exaggeration has been allowed. It is absolutely necessary to immediately take measures to preserve the unity of the party.

- M. Boguslavsky

I am not fully in agreement with the first part, which speaks about the economic situation of the country; the latter is indeed very serious and demands great attention, but up until now the party has not advanced people who would have been able to lead better than those who have been leading until now. Regarding the question of the inner-party situation, I feel that there is a significant portion of truth in everything which has been said, and I consider it necessary to take emergency measures.

- F. Dudnik

== Sources ==
- Communist Opposition in the USSR. 1923-1927. From the Archive of Leon Trotsky, (in Russian) in 4 volumes, Volume 1 (1923–1926), compiled by Yury Felshtinsky, 1988, p. 83-88.
- E. H. Carr. The Interregnum 1923-1924 (in English, contains errors), London, 1954, pp. 367–373. (online at marxists.org)
