= Mikhail Boguslavsky =

Ukrainian-Russian revolutionary and Soviet politician

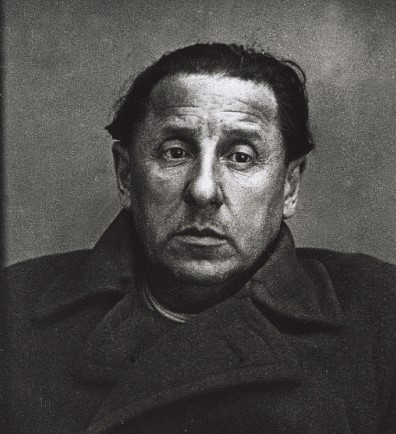
Boguslavsky's 1937 mugshot

Mikhail Solomonovich Boguslavsky (Russia: Михаил Соломонович Богуславский) (1 May 1886 – 1 February 1937) was Russian revolutionary and politician, who was tried and executed as a former supporter of Leon Trotsky.

== Biography ==
The son of a poor Jewish tailor from a village in Poltava province, Ukraine, he left school at the age of 12 to work in a printing house in Kiev, and then Kharkiv. He was arrested for the first time in 1904, in Kharkov, for organising a printers' union. In 1905 he joined the Jewish Socialist Party. Repeatedly arrested. He conducted party work in Kharkov, Nikolaev and Kremenchuk. He joined the Bolsheviks in March 1917, after the February Revolution, and was one of the leading figures in bringing communist rule to Ukraine he joined the RSDLP (b) after the October Revolution, as secretary of the Central Committee of the Ukrainian soviets, and a member of the board People's Commissariat of Finance, and as a leader of red Guard detachments. In 1920-21, he was chairman of the Printers' union. From 1922, he was a member of the Moscow City Council. In 1924, after the death of Lenin, he was appointed chairman of the 'small council' of the Council of People's Commissars of the Russian Soviet Federative Socialist Republic.

In October 1923, Boguslavsky signed The Declaration of 46, and from then supported Trotsky and the left opposition, against the regime of Joseph Stalin. He was expelled from the communist party of the Soviet Union at its Fifteenth Congress, in December 1927, and deported to Novosibirsk, where he was appointed a member of the Siberian Planning Commission. In November 1929, he signed a collective letter renouncing the opposition. His party membership was reinstated in 1930. In 1932, he was appointed head of a mining equipment plant in Novosibirsk.

Boguslavsky was arrested on 5 August 1936, just before the start of the great Moscow show trials, and after just nine days in the hands of his interrogators, began to confess to trumped up charges of sabotage and terrorism. In January 1937, he appeared at the second Moscow show trial, alongside Yuri Pyatakov, Karl Radek and 14 others, and was sentenced to death on 30 January. He was shot two days later. In September 1987, the entire trial was dismissed as a fabrication, and Boguslavsky was rehabilitated.

== Family ==
Boguslavsky's brothers, Reuben and Lev, were shot, respectively, in 1937 and 1938. His son, Adolf Mikhailovich, was shot on 13 July 1937. His second wife, Tatyana Hanina, was sentenced in 1938 to eight years in the labour camps. His daughter from the first marriage, Rebekka, was arrested in December 1937, and also sentenced to eight years. She was released in 1945.
