= Vladimir Smirnov (politician) =

Russian revolutionary and Soviet politician

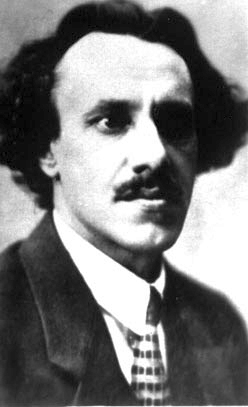
Smirnov c. 1920s

Vladimir Mikhailovich Smirnov (Russian: Влади́мир Миха́йлович Смирно́в; 7 May 1887 – 26 May 1937) was a Russian Communist revolutionary, member of the Bolshevik Party (from 1907) and Soviet politician, where he advocated a militant and doctrinally pure line. He was a persistent critic of successive party leaders, including Vladimir Lenin and Joseph Stalin, for which he spent years in prison and exile before being executed.

== Early life and career ==
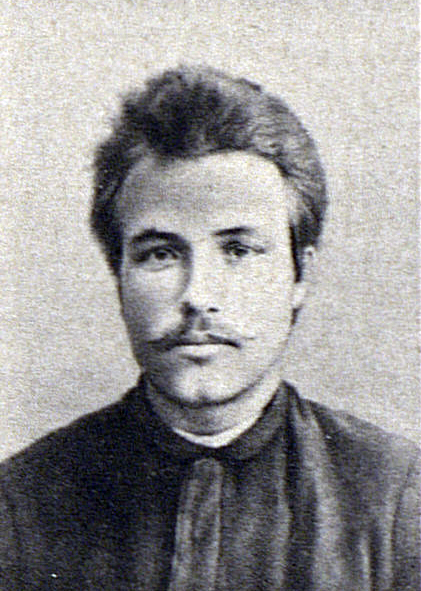
Smirnov in 1917

Smirnov was born in Moscow into a middle-class family, and educated at a Moscow gymnasium. He was drawn into revolutionary politics during the 1905 revolution, and joined the Bolsheviks in 1907, as a law student at Imperial Moscow University. In 1909, he met Nikolai Bukharin, who was the Bolsheviks' student organiser in Moscow. Bukharin, Smirnov and Valerian Osinsky, who were all economists, were "identified as a trio and leaders of theoretical 'raids'" in which they took on rival Marxist groups. Smirnov rebuilt the depleted Moscow party organisation after the other two were arrested in 1910. Mobilised in the outbreak of war with Germany, he served as a warrant officer in the Russian Imperial Army until after the February Revolution.

In summer 1917, the former 'trio' was reunited when they took control of the Bolshevik publications Sotsial Demokrat and Spartak, from older Bolsheviks who opposed Lenin's line that the Bolsheviks should aim to take power in a second revolution. During the October Revolution, Smirnov organised the heavy artillery that enforced Bolshevik rule in Moscow. In November, he was transferred to Petrograd, then still the capital of Russia, to join Bukharin and Osinsky on the executive of the Supreme Council of National Economy, which was originally dominated by the left. He moved back to Moscow when it was designated as the capital again, in 1918, and became financial director of the governing body of the Moscow oblast sovnarkom, which exercised wide powers and had high ambitions of local rule, although it was abolished as early as June 1918. His attempts at forming similar bodies proved short-lived.

== State activities ==
From February to April 1918, Smirnov served as the People's Commissar of Trade and Industry of the RSFSR.

From 1921 to 1927, Smirnov was a member of the board of the Council of Labor and Defense, chairman of the financial commission of the Supreme Council of the National Economy, a member of the Presidium of the State Planning Committee and the Board of the Central Statistical Administration of the USSR. In the same period, in the years 1924 - 1926, he was simultaneously a member of the editorial boards of the newspapers Pravda and Ekonomicheskaya Zhizn.

== In Opposition ==
In January 1918, when the Bolsheviks were divided over whether to sign the Treaty of Brest-Litovsk with Germany, Smirnov joined the Left Communists, led by Bukharin, who advocated 'revolutionary war' with Germany. In February, he resigned from the Bolshevik government to campaign against the treaty, and for the remainder of his life he was in opposition. Part of his reasoning was that there was that to attempt to build socialism in pre-industrialised Russia alone, "a side turning off the main highway of European socialism" was "foredoomed to failure."

During the civil war, he was a leader of the Military Opposition, who opposed the presence of thousands of former officers of the Imperial Army in the newly created Red Army. At the 8th Party Congress of the Russian Communist Party, Smirnov appeared as a delegate from the 5th Army. On 20 March 1919, he gave a speech to the Congress on the use of former Tsarist officers (termed "Specialists" within the party) and of political commissars in the Red Army. Responding to accusations from Grigory Sokolnikov that he opposed the use of officers, which by this point had become a key part of Bolshevik military strategy, he denied favouring the use of partisan militias in the Russian Civil War. He did, however, warn of the inadequate political mechanisms that the Soviet authority had at its disposal to control the officer-specialists. Arguing for the repeal of Decree on Revolutionary Military Councils, he said to the Congress:

...The role of the political commissars is limited to the functions of supervision... Now that we have the political commissars with sufficient combat experience and able not to intervene when not needed, we must give them broader rights, a larger part in the direction of the armies.

Smirnov regarded the commissars as an integral check on the potential disloyalty of the old-régime officers. This preference for so-called "politicisation" of the Red Army was shared by the Left Socialist-Revolutionary Party in opposition, but largely rejected by Leon Trotsky, the People's Commissar of Army and Navy Affairs, who by 1919 exercised full control over the military. But in April 1919 the Central Committee of the RKP appointed Smirnov as the first organiser for ChON volunteers to support the Red Army in the civil-war effort.

During 1920, Smirnov, Osinsky, and Timofei Sapronov formed the Democratic Centralists, or 'Decists', a left wing opposition group that opposed the managerial system in industry, and advocated more democracy within the communist party. Smirnov signed The Declaration of 46 in 1923, and acted as one of the main speakers for the opposition at the party conference in January 1924. In 1926, he and Sapronov formed the "Group of 15", which joined the United Opposition headed by Trotsky, Grigory Zinoviev and Lev Kamenev.

== Exile, prison and death ==
Smirnov was expelled from the Communist Party at the 15th Party Congress in December 1927 along with the rest of the United Opposition. On 31 December 1927, he was told that he had been sentenced to three years of exile in the Ural region, and was given less than a week to leave Moscow. By chance he had just had his teeth removed, in the expectation of getting false teeth, so went to the Urals missing half his teeth. On 29 January 1930, he was arrested for being five minutes late in reporting to the local Ogpu for a routine check, and sentenced to three years in prison, and held in an 'isolator' at Verkhne-Uralsk.

Though they shared exile and prison with Trotsky's supporters, Smirnov and his 'Decist' allies considered themselves to be separate from the rest of the opposition. According to Trotsky's biographer: "In their enmity towards the bureaucracy they had been far less inhibited than the Trotskyists. More or less openly, they had renounced all allegiance to the existing state and party. They proclaimed that the revolution and Bolshevism were dead, and that the working class had to begin again from the beginning ... to free itself from exploitation by the new 'state capitalism'. In 1928, Smirnov described the communist party under Joseph Stalin as a 'stinking corpse', and claimed that the destruction of inner-party democracy in 1923 had been "a mere prologue to the development of a peasant-kulak democracy." A fellow prisoner in Verkhne-Uralsk recorded Smirnov's reaction to a false rumour that went around in spring 1930 that Trotsky had capitulated to Stalin - "Trotsky has capitulated. That is all to the good. This semi-Menshevik will now at last cease to hamper the authentic revolutionary movement by his presence."

On 10 November 1932, Smirnov's prison term was extended by two years. When it was completed, on 4 November 1934, he was sentenced to three years exile in Siberia. After the assassination of Sergei Kirov, in March 1935, he was arrested again and by a special decision of NKVD from 22 May 1935, was re-imprisoned for three years. In early 1937, while serving in the Suzdal special prison, Smirnov sent letters to the People's Commissar of Internal Affairs Nikolai Yezhov and the USSR Prosecutor Andrei Vyshinsky, protesting against his detention. On April 20 the same year, he was transferred to Moscow. On 15 May, his name was included on a death list signed on 15 May 1937 by Stalin, Molotov, Kaganovich and Yezhov. and, on 26 May 1937, the Military Collegium of the Supreme Court USSR under the chairmanship of V. Ulrich sentenced him to death for participating in a counterrevolutionary terrorist organization. Smirnov was shot on the same day, becoming a victim of the Great Purge.

On 16 November 1960, Smirnov was partially rehabilitated but not was fully rehabilitated until 1990.

== Family ==
Vladimir Smirnov's sister, Yekaterina (born 1889) married Valerian Osinsky.

Smirnov's son, Rem (an acronym for Revolution-Engels-Marx), (11 February 1922 – 4 January 2011) was adopted by the Osinsky family when his parents were exiled in 1927, and was sent to an orphanage in Shuya, Ivanovo Oblast with his two cousins when his adoptive parents were arrested in 1937. Drafted in 1942, as a private in the Red Army he took part in the defence of Moscow, the reconquest of Belarus, and the capture of Konigsberg (Kaliningrad). After the war, he graduated in mathematics from Moscow University, and worked as physicist in Kurgan, where he became a renowned specialist in quantum mechanics.
