= Caridad Mercader =

Spanish communist militant and Soviet agent

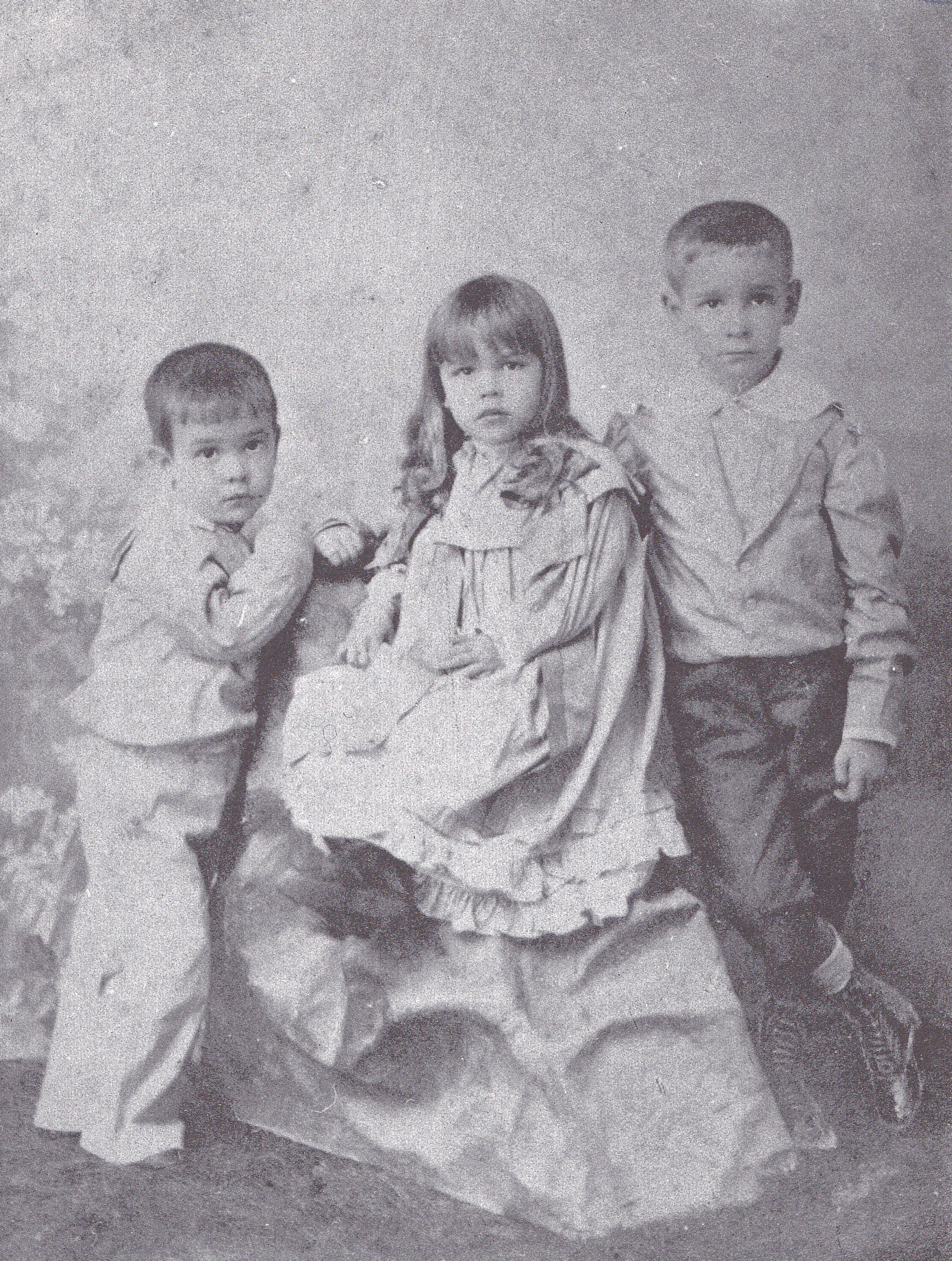
- Mercader and her brothers, c. 1895
- Born: Eustacia María Caridad del Río Hernández; 29 March 1892; Santiago de Cuba, Captaincy General of Cuba
- Died: 28 October 1975 (aged 82); Paris 17, France
- Employer: NKVD
- Known for: Her involvement in the assassination of Leon Trotsky and being the mother of Ramón Mercader, the assassin
- Political party: Unified Socialist Party of Catalonia
- Spouse: Pablo Mercader Marina
- Children: Jorge, Ramón, Pablo, Montserrat and Luis

Eustacia María Caridad del Río Hernández (Note: This was the full name given by Isaac Don Levine in 1959, as determined by the investigation carried out after the true identity of Trotsky's murderer, Ramón Mercader, son of Caridad, had been revealed. Per the testimony in his book published in 1990 by Luis Mercader, son of Caridad and brother of Ramón, he simply cites the name María de la Caridad del Río Hernández.) (Russian: Каридад Рамоновна Меркадер, romanized: Karidad Ramonovna Merkader; 29 March 1892 – 1975), better known as Caridad del Río, Caridad Mercader or Caritat Mercader, was a Spanish communist militant and an agent of the Soviet NKVD. She is also known for being the mother of Ramón Mercader, the assassin of Leon Trotsky, and for having personally participated in the operation.

Caridad Mercader belonged to a wealthy family from Barcelona of Indiano origin (Note: A term used to refer to Spanish emigrants who returned from the New World after having acquired riches.) (term applied to a Spaniard who emigrated to the Americas who later returned to Spain enriched) in the early 20th century. She married Pablo Mercader, a member of Barcelona's industrial upper class, from whom she took the name (Spanish women do not normally take their husbands' surnames), and with whom she had five children. After the end of her marriage to Pablo Mercader, she moved away from her family and permanently turned her back on the social class they represented. This decision was motivated in part by an episode of forced institutionalization during which she was subjected to electroshock therapy and her former husband's attempts to change her state of "sexual apathy" through visits to local brothels. Mercader began to frequent anarchist circles and soon embraced communist ideology. At the outbreak of the Spanish Civil War, she participated in the fights against the military uprising in Barcelona and joined the groups that left for Aragon, where she suffered severe injuries during an aerial attack.

Mercader achieved some notoriety as a member of the Unified Socialist Party of Catalonia (Partit Socialista Unificat de Catalunya, PSUC). In 1936 she led a propaganda mission to Mexico and later became an agent of the NKVD in Spain. Her son Ramón, also a member of the PSUC and an officer in the Spanish Republican Army, was also recruited by Soviet espionage during the war, likely with the involvement of his mother. Under orders from Josef Stalin, as part of Operation Utka (Operation Duck), Ramon Mercader was enlisted and trained to assassinate Leon Trotsky, who was in exile in Mexico. Caridad, who had settled in Paris some time in 1937, also participated in the operation. When Ramón was arrested after murdering Trotsky, Caridad managed to leave Mexico and escape to the Soviet Union, where she was received with honors, awarded the Order of Lenin. The Hero of the Soviet Union was reserved for Ramon upon his release from a Mexican prison. In the Soviet Union, Caridad actively participated in conflicts between the different factions of exiled Spanish communists, including with Dolores Ibárruri, La Pasionaria.

Caridad found conditions in the Soviet Union disappointing and never adapted to life there. She bitterly told her son Luis and confidante Enrique Castro Delgado that they had fought for "Utopia" but were living in "Hell". She expressed that she felt deluded and that she had turned her son Ramon into a murderer, her son Luis into a hostage, and her other two children into ruins. She felt their only recompense had been "cuatro porquerias" (four pieces of trash), referring to the medals. In 1944, with some difficulty, Caridad obtained a permit to leave the Soviet Union. Violating the agreed conditions that she settle in Cuba, she traveled to Mexico, with the aim of achieving the release of her son Ramón. Unknown to Caridad, at Stalin's direction, the Soviets were running an undercover operation to stage the prison escape of Ramón Mercader. The awkward intervention of Caridad Mercader was counterproductive, causing the Mexican authorities to toughen Ramón's prison conditions and the Soviets to abandon their operation. Ramón was left in prison to serve out the remaining 16 years of his 20-year sentence. Ramón, who according to his brother Luis never shared his mother's passion for the communist cause, blamed his mother for botching his release and never forgave her interference.

After the failure of Operation Utka, Caridad settled in Paris, where her daughter Montserrat and son Jorge lived with their families, enjoying a Soviet pension. Disillusioned with communist reality, she nevertheless stubbornly continued to be a communist, worshiping Stalin and believing in his doctrine. She occasionally traveled to the Soviet Union to visit her sons, Luis, as well as Ramón, who had settled there after serving his sentence in Mexico. Caridad Mercader died in the French capital in 1975. The Soviet embassy in Paris took care of the funeral and burial.

== Early years ==
Eustacia María Caridad del Río Hernández was born in Santiago de Cuba in 1892 into a wealthy family. Her father, Ramón del Río, was originally from the Spanish province of Santander, but when the family decided to return to Spain, a few years before Cuban independence, they settled in Barcelona, where they became part of the city's social elite. Caridad had at least two brothers. Although Caridad later claimed that her father had been governor of Santiago as well as the first planter to free his slaves on the Antillean island, none of this is true. Nor, contrary to what Caridad asserted, had her mother sympathized with the Cuban independence movement.

Caridad studied at the Catholic school of the Sacred Heart of Sarriá, also spending time in the centers that the congregation had in Paris and London. As a result, she spoke French and English perfectly. Apparently, during her adolescence she felt the call of a religious vocation, although she did not choose it.

When Caridad was barely 16 years old, on June 13, 1908, the Barcelona press announced the engagement of Caridad del Río to Pablo Mercader Marina, seven years older than her and a member of a prosperous family in the textile business. Pablo's father, Narciso Mercader Sacanella, had started his business with a factory in Badalona, expanding it with several more factories in Barcelona. The engagement was a bond that united two wealthy families of the Barcelona bourgeoisie. Both of the fiancés were equestrians. Caridad herself later stated that she fell in love with Pablo Mercader for his mastery as a rider. On January 7, 1911, the wedding took place. Mercader had an affable character, politically aligning himself with conservative Catalan nationalism and having been a member of the somatén. At that time, Caridad "was a beautiful teenager with a round face and pleasant features with a sweet look [...] in her green eyes that were always her most distinctive feature." The couple settled on Illas i Vidal street, in the upper-class neighborhood of Sant Gervasi de Cassoles. The young wife adopted her husband's surname and would thereafter be known as Caridad, or Caritat, Mercader. The couple had five children: Jorge (b. 1911), Ramón (b. 1913), Montserrat (b. 1914 ), Pablo (b. 1915) and Luis (b. 1923). Shortly after Pablo's birth, Jorge fell ill with poliomyelitis and suffered paralysis of both legs.

== Breakup of the marriage and move to France ==
The marriage was unhappy, beginning to fail after the first years of living together. According to his wife, Pablo Mercader, ostensibly a devoted family man in private, showed some unconventional sexual proclivities. As their son Luis described in the documentary Asaltar los cielos, (Note: Asaltar los cielos is a documentary film, released in 1996, by José Luis López-Linares and Javier Rioyo about the assassination of Trotsky.) Caridad had told him that her husband took her to brothels to incite her to new sexual experiences. There, he forced her to observe through peepholes hidden in room partitions the sexual encounters between the prostitutes and their clients. These episodes created in Caridad a deep contempt for her husband, as well as for her social class.

[Caridad Mercader is] the symbol of the
seduction exercised by the Soviet revolution on
enlightened minds and the fanaticism that can
result. —Javier Rioyo at the presentation
of the documentary Asaltar los cielos (1996)

Until this point in time, Caridad had lived according to the conventions of her social circle. At the beginning of the 1920s, however, she began to display an attitude that clashed with bourgeois customs. According to the journalist and writer Gregorio Luri—who recounts what was reported by Isaac Don Levine (Note: Isaac Don Levine (1892–1981) was an American journalist and writer of Russian origin who published The Mind of an Assassin in 1959, about Trotsky's assassin. The following year, the Spanish translation was published in Mexico, with the title La mente de un asesino. The sources used in his book, according to Levine himself, were "former fellow militants of the Mercader, Catalan refugees and exiles, all of whom prefer to remain anonymous.") and included testimonies from Enrique Castro Delgado and Pablo Mercader, Caridad's first husband—Caridad began taking painting classes with the Valencian artist Vicente Borrás y Abella, in whose studio she was able to establish contact with intellectuals and bohemians. Thus began her personal transformation and, little by little, Caridad began to frequent unconventional circles and use morphine. According to her son Ramón, Caridad was secretly addicted to opiates for many years. (Note: Narrated by Luis Mercader in the book—testimony that he wrote about his brother Ramón in collaboration with the journalist Germán Sánchez in 1990, upon his return from exile: Ramón Mercader, mi hermano. Cincuenta años después. (Ramón Mercader, My brother. Fifty Years Later).) At the height of "Pistolerismo" (hired assassins that targeted proletariat groups) in Barcelona, Caridad frequented anarchist circles, even going so far as to provide them with information with which to attack the business interests of the Mercader. Since her brother, José del Río, was a municipal judge and knew which magistrates were in charge of a specific case, Caridad informed the anarchists of the identity of the judges who were handling each trial for terrorist acts against their comrades. These in turn used the information to threaten the magistrates and obtain the freedom of the accused. The decline of the couple's economic position began around this time, which also influenced Caridad's metamorphosis. When the Mercader family patriarch died in 1921, his first-born son, Juan, the primogenitor (or hereu in Catalonia), was left in charge of the family businesses. However, Juan Mercader's administration was ruinous, the business collapsed, and he finally fled with his family to Argentina. The rest of the Mercader family was left in a precarious economic position, and the Mercader-Del Río couple had to move to a more modest apartment on Ancha Street, in the Gothic Quarter, next to the Basilica of La Merced. According to the journalist and researcher Javier Juárez, (Note: Javier Juárez is the author of a biography about Africa de las Heras, also a communist militant and NKVD agent: Patria: una española en el KGB (2008) (Homeland: A Spanish Woman in the KGB).) Caridad had to start teaching classes to contribute to the support of the family economy and it was that—and not her relationship with Borrás and Abella's studio—that made her begin to interact very differently from those of her social class. Pablo Mercader worked as an accountant, primarily for small publishing companies.

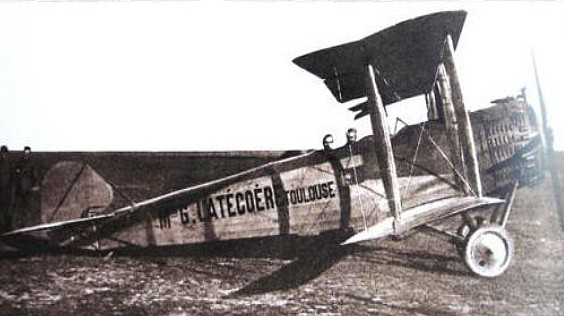
Airplane of the Latécoère Airline in 1919. Caridad Mercader established a romantic relationship in the 1920s with Louis Delrieu, pilot of the Latécoère line between Paris and Toulouse. Caridad and her children went to live in France with Delrieu.

Another factor contributing to the end of her marriage was the relationship that Caridad began with the French aviator Louis Delrieu. The identity of the aviator was postulated in 2013 by Gregorio Luri. Delrieu, who regularly piloted on the Latécoère line between Casablanca and Toulouse, had to make an emergency landing near Alicante, in 1919. (Note: Louis Delrieu (1889–1976) had been a pilot in the Great War, in which he received several decorations. After his demobilization, he entered the service of Latécoère to cover the Paris–Casablanca line.) Coincidentally, Caridad was staying at a family property in the area. Louis and Caridad met and fell in love: "He was young, elegant and chivalrous, and he embodied the mythical aura of heroism that surrounded the pioneers of aviation." They became lovers, although it is not known exactly when. Delrieu was the godfather of Caridad's youngest son, Luis, who was born in 1923. It was even rumored that Delrieu was Luis's real father. An anti-Stalinist writer like Julián Gorkin attributed Caridad's personal and ideological turn to her relationship with this aviator: "She had relations with an aviator pilot, a communist militant, who infected her with his fanaticism." However, according to Luis, his godfather, whom he did not identify by name, had been a member of the Croix-de-feu, a French fascist organization, founded in 1927.

All of these scandals led the Del Río and Mercader families to take drastic measures. According to Caridad's account, her involvement in anarchist attacks had been discovered, and she was facing the possibility of being imprisoned. One night in 1923, nurses from the Nueva Belén de Sant Gervasi Asylum, accompanied by Caridad's brothers, entered her house, put a straitjacket on her, and admitted her. Her husband and brothers considered it preferable for her to be believed insane rather than for her to end up in prison. At the asylum she was held incommunicado for 3 months, subjected to extremely aggressive treatment, with frequent cold showers and electroshock treatment. "I really thought I would go crazy there," Caridad later confessed to her son Luis. She never forgave her family for this traumatic experience. From then on, she considered herself free from any commitment to her family or social class.

Eventually, she managed to be released from the psychiatric institution. Caridad told her son Luis that it was her anarchist friends who, after finding out where she was, sent her husband and her brothers death threats if they did not let her leave the mental institution, to which they finally agreed.

Upon release, Caridad decided to radically change her life and cut off all relations with her family. Sometime between 1924 and 1925 she took her five children and went with Delrieu to the French town of Dax, in Les Landes. There she lived happily with her lover until 1928, when she decided to end the relationship.

Shortly after moving to Toulouse, where she ran a restaurant, Caridad attempted suicide. Upon being notified, Caridad's still-legal husband, Pablo Mercader, traveled to the French city and took charge of Montserrat, Pablo and Luis, the three youngest children. The four returned to Barcelona, where the three children were educated in religious boarding schools, mainly due to Pablo Mercader's modest economic situation. Jorge and Ramón stayed in Toulouse, where they studied hospitality at a trade school, the first to become a chef and the second to be a maître de hotel.

Upon recovery, Caridad went to live in Paris, where she joined a group within the French Socialist Party, specifically the French Section of the Workers' International (French: Section Française de l'Internationale Ouvrière, SFIO) of the 15th district. This group, far to the left of the party, was led by Marceau Pivert, who in 1935 would form a faction in the SFIO (Gauche Révolutionnaire), which would later split and adopt Trotskyism. There is a photo from 1928 (Note: Gregorio Luri postulates this date.) in which Caridad Mercader appears on a country excursion with several followers of the SFIO, among whom were Pivert himself and his daughter Jacqueline. Some accounts postulate that it was at this time that Caridad came in contact with Soviet espionage. Gorkin claims it was as early as 1928, according to the testimony of "a former cultural attaché at the Soviet embassy in Paris." At this time, she may also have met Leonid Eitingon, a Soviet intelligence officer, who would later recruit her. (Note: It is known that, between 1927 and 1936, before his arrival in Spain, Eitingon was an illegal agent of the NKVD (known as OGPU until 1934) with numerous postings outside the Soviet Union. This is stated in the exposition of the Trotsky assassination operation written in 1997 by Lev Voroviev (or Vorobiov), a Russian spy, who had access in the 1990s to the files of the Federal Security Service of the Russian Federation (FSB, successor of the KGB).) Eitingon would have been in China, France and Germany before being assigned to Spain. Mary-Kay Wilmers, in her biography of several members of the Eitingon family published in 2012, did not offer data on Eitingon between his departure from Istanbul—the next destination after China—in 1931 and his arrival in Spain in 1936. Pável Sudoplátov, in his account of his activities within the NKVD that he published in the 1990s, Special Tasks, only cites that in the early 1930s, after his stay in China, Eitingon was assigned to the United States and that, when he returned to the Soviet Union, he obtained a leadership position in the NKVD. In any case, in the early 1930s, Caridad had become affiliated with the French Communist Party (Parti Communiste Français, or PCF). According to Levine, she acted as a courier for the Communist International and, perhaps, of the NKVD. Levine maintained that Caridad enjoyed telling those closest to her how Maurice Thorez, general secretary of the PCF, Jacques Duclos, and other French communist leaders behaved in bed. (Note: Mary-Kay Wilmers labels Levine as "the most sensationalist of the Cold War historians.") Also at the time, approximately 1930, Montserrat escaped from the boarding school where she was studying in Barcelona and went to live with her mother in France. Montserrat joined the PCF, and there she met André Marty, whose secretary she would later become, during the Spanish Civil War.

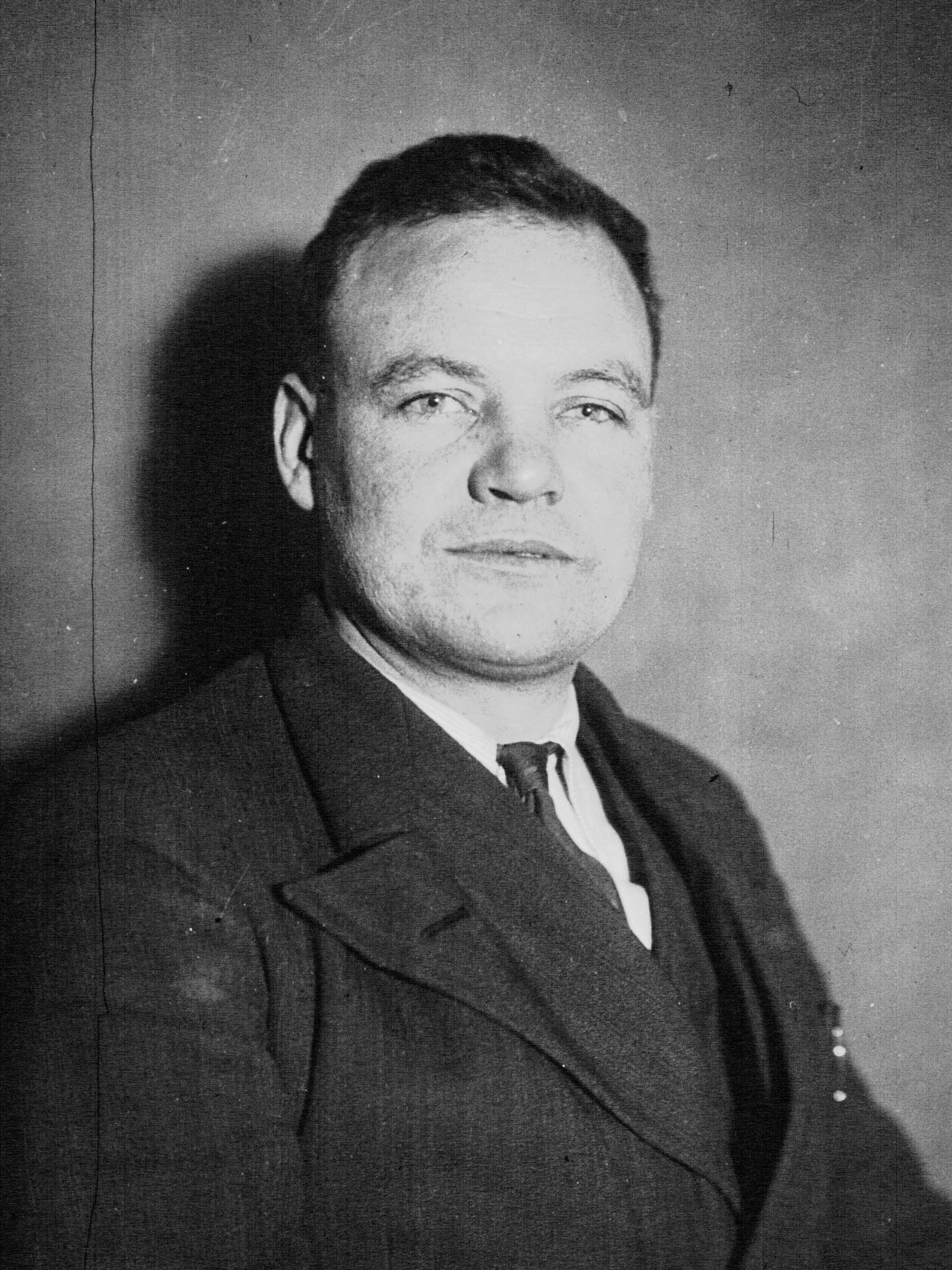
Maurice Thorez, general secretary of the French Communist Party, in 1932. According to Isaac Don Levine, Caridad Mercader was his lover during her stay in France in the 1930s.

When the Republic was proclaimed in Spain in 1931, Ramón returned to Barcelona, where he found a job at the Ritz Hotel. During this period, Ramón was already a communist militant—as he told his brother Luis. In 1935, upon his mother's return to Spain, Ramón had been a convinced communist for several years. Both his siblings, Jorge and Montserrat, as well as his mother, remained in France. Caridad's other son, Luis, recalled how throughout his stay at a boarding school in Barcelona, from the ages 5 to 11, he received only a single visit from Caridad, accompanied by Ramón. Jorge did not return to Spain, and Luis did not see him again until he moved to France in 1937. For her part, Caridad had problems with the French police, who prohibited her from residing in Paris, thus she moved to the environs of Bordeaux. In 1935 Caridad was arrested and, as she told Luis, the police brutally beat her, resulting in her loss of vision for 15 days. She was subsequently expelled from the country. In June 1935, Ramón was arrested for his communist militancy.

== Return to Barcelona and participation in the Spanish Civil War ==
After being expelled from France, Caridad settled in Barcelona and joined the Communist Party of Catalonia (Partido Comunista de Cataluña, PCC), the tiny Catalan branch of the Spanish Communist Party (Partido Comunista Español, PCE), in which her son Ramón was already active. She participated in the process of confluence of almost all the Catalan workers' parties that gave rise to the Partit Socialista Unificat de Catalunya (PSUC), and at the beginning of July 1936 she was appointed by the PCC, along with Pere Ardiaca, a member of the Treball editorial team, which would be the organ of expression of the new party. At the same time, in mid-1936, Caridad was part of the secretariat of the Press Services of the Popular Olympics, the multi-sports event that was going to be held in July of that year in Barcelona in response to the Berlin Olympic Games. Luis said that during that time, when he lived with his father, he rarely saw Caridad.

Grammar teaches us
that the masculine plural of certain nouns
may well include people of both sexes.
But since on the Madrid front,
as well as in Oviedo and Catalonia,
women have fought like lionesses,
beside their fathers, husbands, boyfriends, brothers,
or simply comrades
[...]
since Caridad Mercader
covered herself with decorations
stamped in the folds of her wounds;
[...]
since then, it is not possible
to refer to defenders and martyrs
of Iberian freedom,
without using, next to the masculine noun,
the voice,
white as a maternal breast
and energetic like a reveille at the break of day,
the voice of a new dictionary:
“militiawomen”!
—AGUILERA, Francisco (May 29, 1937).
"The Academy take note."
American Repertory,
San José de Costa Rica, XXXIII: 20, 319 42

In the early morning of July 18–19, 1936, the Barcelona garrison revolted. Caridad actively participated in the fighting against the rebel troops, notably in the assault on the Captaincy General of Barcelona, spearheaded by the leader of the rebels in Barcelona, General Manuel Goded, who had arrived from Palma de Mallorca a few hours before. By account, on the evening of the 19th, it was Caridad Mercader who convinced the militiamen, after the soldiers' surrender, to take Goded before the president of the Generalitat, Lluís Companys, instead of executing him on the spot. Once before the president, Goded agreed to broadcast a message recognizing the failure of the uprising in Catalonia and asking those who still resisted to surrender. The role of Caridad Mercader in the episode was narrated by the French journalist André Jacquelin (Note: André Jacquelin, a correspondent for L'Indépendant de Perpignan, arrived in Barcelona on the same day, July 19.) in his work Espagne et liberté: le second Munich (1939): "Militiamen and militiawomen were grouped around him [General Goded], and among the latter we must highlight the examples of [Catalan] Louise Michel as well as Caridas [sic] Mercader, with her clothes in tatters but sublime in her ardent faith. At the risk of her life, she had saved the famous rebel general Goddet [sic] (Governor of Barcelona) from massacre to deliver him alive to the people's court." The story also was published on July 26 in La Dèpêche de Toulouse.

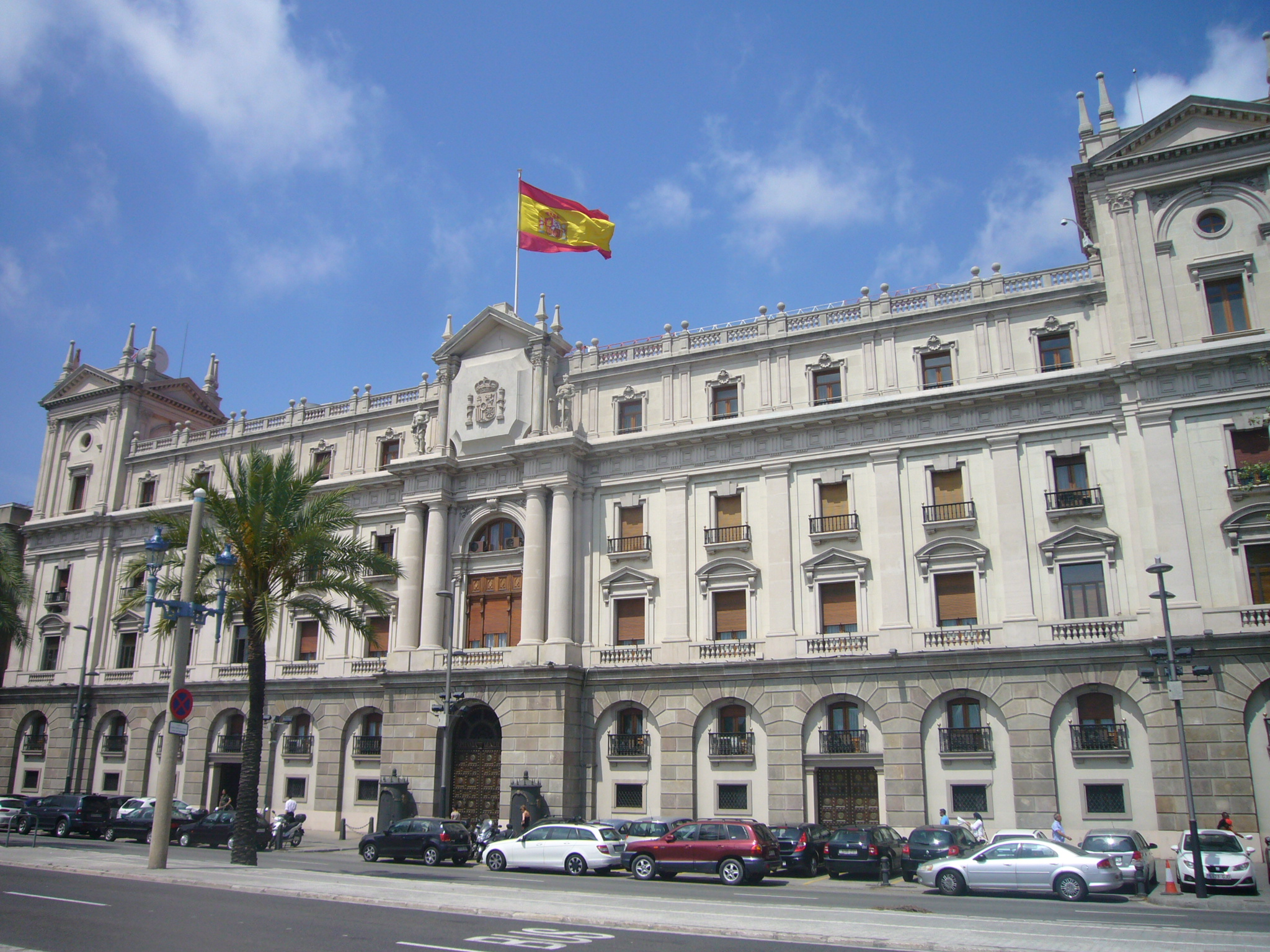
Facade of the Captaincy General building on Paseo de Colón in Barcelona, where General Goded barricaded himself. After his surrender, Caridad Mercader persuaded the militiamen to respect his life and hand him over to the president of the Generalitat, Companys.

After the failure of the uprising in Barcelona, Caridad became actively involved in the organization of the first columns that were formed in the city to put down the rebels. Sources differ regarding the assignment of Caridad Mercader: according to several sources, she left for the Aragon front in the column led by Durruti and Pérez Farrás—the Durruti column— although it is also possible that instead it was to the Trueba-Del Barrio, formed by communist militia. (Note: The painter Josep Bartolí, who was active in the column led by Caridad Mercader, stated that she led an independent column, not integrated into the one led by the anarchist leader. He also maintained that her son Ramón was part of the same column. For that matter, Luis Mercader stated that his brother had been part, since his departure to the front, of the Trueba-Del Barrio column—which would later become the Carlos Marx column, the embryo of the 27th Division of the Republican Army. However, it is also true that there were communist militants in the Durruti column. Likewise, Luis said that the place where his mother was injured was a different sector from Tardienta, which was the area where the Carlos Marx column acted and where Ramón was injured.) Her sons Ramón and Pablo also joined their mother's column, while her daughter Montserrat and her son-in-law, Jacques Dudouyt, arrived in Spain as volunteers. Montserrat worked as secretary to André Marty, who led the International Brigades with an iron fist. A few days later, Caridad was seriously injured in an air attack. Some sources affirm that it was in Tardienta, where the Carlos Marx column operated, while others suggest Bujaraloz, belonging to the sector of the Durruti column. (Note: As described in the previous note, Bartolí did not indicate where Caridad Mercader was injured, but he did describe that it took place in the sector in which Bartolí himself was located, integrated into the Trueba-Del Barrio column. Teresa Pàmies, a member of the JSUC, who later became a friend of Ramón Mercader, also maintained that Caridad was injured in Tardienta, although she describes an artillery attack as the cause. For his part, Luis explicitly denied that this event took place in Tardienta. Bujaraloz, where Gorkin claims she was wounded, belonged to the front sector where the Durruti column operated.) (Note: As narrated by the painter Josep Bartolí, who was part of the column. Other versions maintain that it was an artillery attack.) The shrapnel caused eleven wounds, some of them quite serious, so she had to be evacuated to Lérida, where she underwent surgery and was treated for her wounds. Although she recovered almost completely, she had some chronic sequela, such as an intestinal ailment. Eight weeks after being wounded at the front, Caridad left the hospital.

Communist propaganda was used extensively to turn Caridad Mercader into the model of the Catalan anti-fascist combatants, hailing her as "the Catalan Pasionaria" or "the Passionflower of Catalonia". Thus, in its September 1 issue, Treball, the official organ of the PSUC, used Caridad as an example of the women volunteers who had joined the militias due to political commitment and not out of frivolity: "Mercader is far from being the boisterous young woman who dresses in overalls for reasons no one understands like those who appear today in the illustrated pages of certain sensational magazines and even at times in yellow journalism." Proof of her prestige was the work of the Cuban writer and revolutionary Juan Marinello, who met Caridad Mercader in 1937. He dedicated to Caridad Mercader, with great exaggerations and praise, one of the chapters of his book Spanish Moment, written in 1937, which compiled articles about the Spanish Civil War: "Anarchist for many years, practitioner of direct action as the only action, worshipper and parishioner of the bomb attack, she came to Marxism through slow and firm conviction. When she found the truth, she entered into it with carnal passion. [...] What women have done for the freedom of the world in Spanish lands would not fit in the broadest anthology of heroism [...]. The most astonishing thing is the calm decisiveness with which she marches towards certain death. There are countless cases of women walking, conscious, towards the final sacrifice without hesitation, without a tremor, without a gesture, without a complaint [...]."

Caridad did not return to the front, but was charged with leading a propaganda mission by the Generalitat of Catalonia, the PSUC, and the Committee of Anti-Fascist Militias of Catalonia (Comité de Milicias Antifascistas de Cataluña) to Mexico and the United States with the intent to acquire weapons and money. The expedition embarked from the port of Barcelona on September 18, 1936. Among other communist militants, Caridad was accompanied by her daughter Montserrat, as well as Lena Imbert, a teacher, communist militant, and girlfriend of her son Ramón, who served as his secretary. The ship in which they were traveling, the Manuel Arnús, arrived in Havana on October 25. There, the officers deserted, joining the rebel side, while the members of the expedition were detained by the Cuban authorities, hostile to the Spanish Republic. Thanks to the efforts of the Mexican government, they were able to reach Mexico, aboard a Mexican warship. The members of the expedition arrived in Veracruz on November 10 and were received by President Lázaro Cárdenas and his wife. On the 17th of the same month, Caridad and two other members of the mission spoke before the Mexican Chamber of Deputies (Cámara de Diputados Mexicana). (Note: The speakers before the legislative chamber were Caridad Mercader, Bartolomé Costa and Lena Imbert. Signatures exist for the following members of the mission: Bartolomé Costa, R. Martínez, Daniel Rebull, Rafael Sánchez, Antonio Roselló, Caridad Mercader, Enrique Pérez C., Edmundo García, Pedro Viñes, T. Detrell, Evelia Larrainagas, Lena Imbert, Juan Ruiz, A. Detrell, Serafín Pérez, as well as others not identified. The signature of other communist militants who participated in the expedition – such as Nito Palerm Vich – are not recorded.)

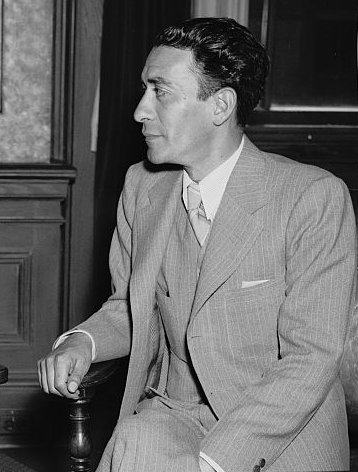
Vicente Lombardo Toledano, general secretary of the Confederation of Mexican Workers (Confederación de Trabajadores de México), and NKVD collaborator, according to the declassified documents of the Venona project, was one of the hosts of Caridad Mercader's expedition to Mexico in 1936.

And here we are, Mexican citizen deputies.
Here we are making an appearance and placing
in your hands, as official representatives
of the Mexican people, this message that we ask
you to transmit to each and every one of the
districts of the extensive Mexican territory as a
faithful heartfelt expression of the voice of
Republican Spain. Mexicans, brothers generous
and cordial! All of Spain acclaims and greets you.
The name of your great country, together with that
of your distinguished President Cárdenas, are
already consecrated as two milestones in the new
history of Spain and are also indelibly engraved in
the hearts of all Spaniards.
—Caridad Mercader before the Chamber of
Deputies of Mexico (November 17, 1936).

From this stay in Mexico dates an anecdote starring Bartolomeu Costa-Amic, a member of the POUM at that time, and which he did not make public until 1994, when he published his memoirs. Costa-Amic, along with other militants of the anti-Stalinist party, had arrived to Mexico in October 1936, forming part of a delegation that was carrying out a propaganda tour to obtain weapons and money in that country. In his memoirs, he claimed, in the name of Andreu Nin, responsibility for the efforts that led to President Lázaro Cárdenas granting asylum to Trotsky in Mexico. (Note: The literature on the subject unanimously assigns Diego Rivera, at the request of the American section of the Fourth International, the responsibility of having contacted President Cárdenas and getting him to agree to give asylum to Trotsky. The request would have reached Rivera on November 21. Two days later, Rivera presented the request to Cárdenas in Torreón, obtaining asylum for the Soviet politician. However, disagreements in the government regarding the asylum meant that asylum was granted several weeks later. Thus, the granting of asylum would have been not only after Caridad Mercader's departure from Spain, but even after her arrival in Mexico. Costa-Amic maintains that it was he, carrying a letter from Andreu Nin, then Minister of Justice of the Generalitat of Catalonia, who managed to meet with President Cárdenas, who agreed to the request after a few minutes of conversation. The granting of asylum would thus have been prior to Mercader's arrival in Mexico, although after her departure from Barcelona.) On November 20, Caridad Mercader, wearing a militiaman's overalls, and arm in arm with Mexican union leader Lombardo Toledano, occupied the head of an annual march commemorating the Mexican Revolution in Mexico City. According to Costa-Amic, whose first wife had met Caridad Mercader in the sewing workshop of the La Innovación in Barcelona, she would have recognized the Catalan communist leader and would have rebuked her, telling her, in Catalan: "You bastard, you have come to organize the assassination of Trotsky", to which Mercader would have responded with evasions. However, it has been pointed out that on the date of the demonstration—November 20—sources of the time agree that it had not yet been decided to grant asylum to Trotsky, which would destroy the credibility of Costa-Amic's statements. In any case, Caridad Mercader's expedition returned to Spain at the end of the year, stopping in the United States, where it also carried out propaganda activities. After leaving New York on a ship that also carried a hundred American volunteers heading to Spain to join the Lincoln Battalion. On January 7, 1937 Caridad arrived in Spain.

Returning from her North American tour, Caridad Mercader learned that her son Pablo had died a few days before on the Madrid front. On January 3, at the beginning of the third battle of the Coruña highway, an enemy tank passed over the machine gun nest in which he was located, near Brunete. (Note: Gorkin, accusing Caridad of being a ruthless and insensitive mother, affirms that Pablo had been sent to the Madrid front, to a disciplinary battalion, as a sanction for having been insubordinate, to which Caridad would have assented. According to his brother Luis, there was no evidence to support Pablo's alleged insubordination and his transfer to a disciplinary battalion on the dangerous Madrid front.) (Note: According to Luis Mercader.) It was Luis, who still lived with his father, who informed her that Pablo had died in combat. Caridad then asked Luis to move in with her, to which he agreed, abandoning his father. In the words of Luis, "my father was a simple citizen oblivious to what was happening around him. To the contrary, they [Caridad, Ramón and Pablo] were heroes." Having barely lived with his mother during his life, Luis saw the request as an opportunity to get closer to her, and he agreed. He would never see his father again. Mother and son lived in a palace located on Paseo de la Bonanova, in Sarrià, which had been requisitioned by Ramón, (Note: According to Luis Mercader.) and which had belonged to a relative of the Mercader family. The palace also served as the headquarters of the general staff of the battalion commanded by Ramón, Jaume Graells, which received training in an old convent—known as the Vorochilov barracks located nearby.

At that time, Caridad Mercader was named head of the Anti-Fascist Women's Group (Agrupación de Mujeres Antifascistas), but she progressively disengaged from mobilization and propaganda tasks as she became more involved in work related to the Soviet political police, which had recruited her at the beginning of that year. However, along with other PSUC militant women, she participated in the combats that took place during the May Days of 1937, according to her son, transporting weapons and ammunition for the communist forces that took part in the fight. A snapshot is preserved by Agustí Centelles in which Caridad Mercader appears participating in the removal of barricades in Barcelona after the events. It is also known that Marinello met Caridad Mercader when he traveled to Spain on the occasion of his attendance at the II International Congress of Writers for the Defense of Culture (II Congreso Internacional de Escritores para la Defensa de la Cultura), which took place in July 1937. Also in July, so that he could continue studying, Caridad sent Luis to Paris to live with his sister Montserrat and her husband, who had returned to France after having had great differences with Marty.

== NKVD agent ==
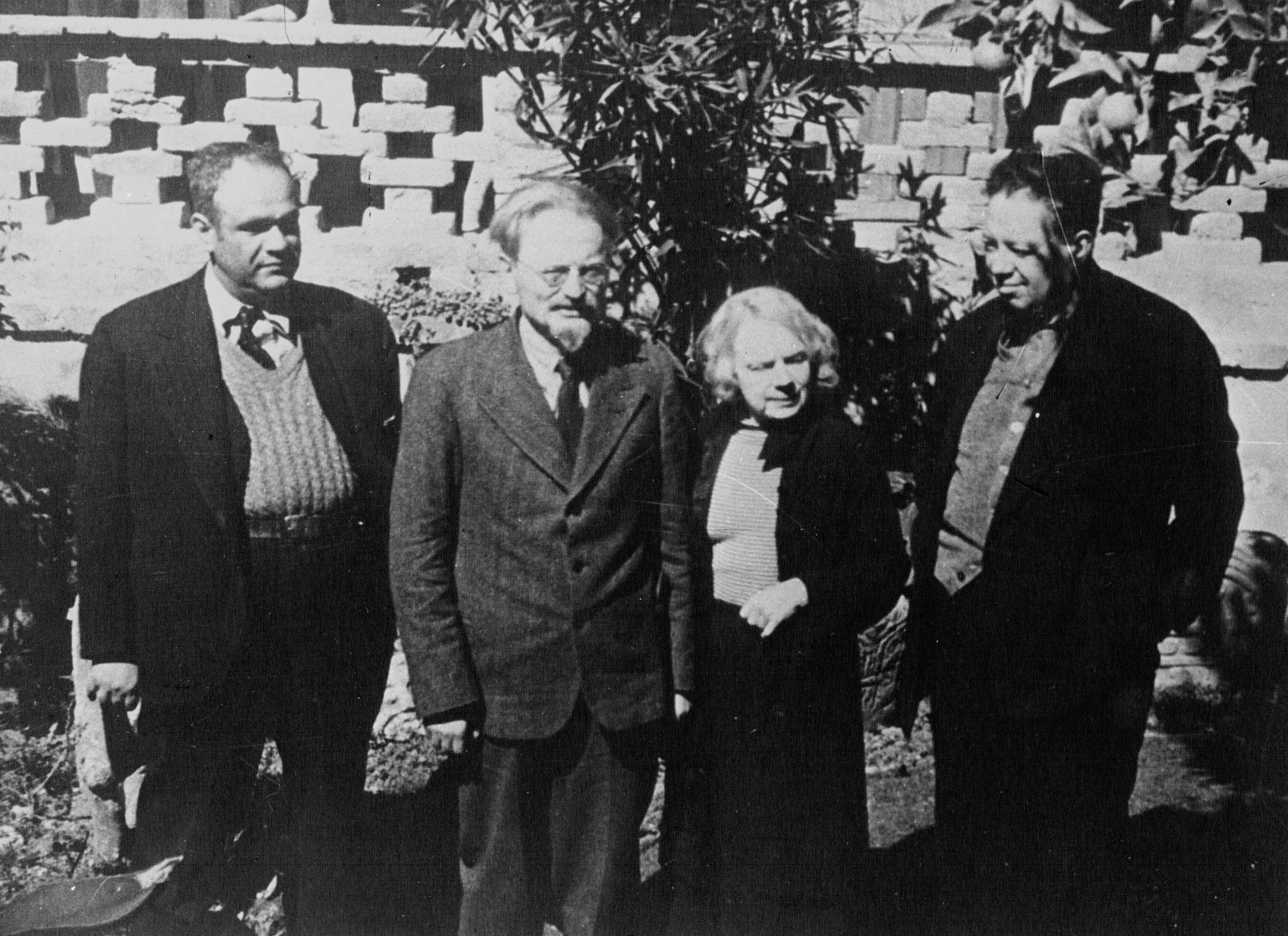
Trotsky and his wife in Mexico in 1937.

The information available in the former Soviet archives on Caridad Mercader has not been systematically explored. It is known that she was recruited at the beginning of 1937. (Note: In his biography of Africa de las Heras, Javier Juárez, who does not cite Soviet documentation, gives the most probable date of the beginning of work for the Soviet agency as the first weeks of 1937, shortly after her return to Spain.) An episode narrated by Luis Mercader refers to him and his mother, shortly after returning from Mexico in the winter of 1937, visiting Ramón in the Madrid front where he was located. Luis did not specify the date. Ramón and Caridad had a long conversation, the purpose of which, according to Luis, was to convince Ramón to also join the NKVD. Months later, in April, Luis would have drawn his conclusions: "...I found out that my mother was affiliated with the Soviets (we called them that). Later I understood that my brother Ramón was affiliated with them." Through Caridad Mercader, the NKVD also recruited other Spanish communists, such as África de las Heras, or Carmen Brufau, a friend of Caridad.

As to who introduced Caridad into the Soviet espionage apparatus, two options have usually been suggested: Erno Gerö and Leonid Eitingon. Gerö, who used the pseudonym Pedro, was a Hungarian communist who was in Barcelona as a delegate of the International Communist (Internacional Comunista) in the PSUC. Since 1932 he had been in the PCC—and head of the NKVD mission in Catalonia. According to Luis, Gerö was a person very close to his family, who "could have been [...] a link between the Soviets and my family in those years." Caridad was "very fond of him." (Note: For Juárez, given his position in the PSUC—previously in the PCC—and his active role in Barcelona, Gerö “necessarily” belonged to Caridad Mercader's entourage.) However, the responsibility for recruiting Caridad Mercader has traditionally been attributed to Leonid Eitingon, whom she may have met years before in France. The documentation available in the Russian Federal Security Service (FSB, successor to the KGB) confirms that this was Caridad Mercader's recruiter. Eitingon, a prominent officer in the Special Operations Department of the NKVD, was sent to Spain a few weeks after the start of the war, as deputy to Alexander Orlov, head of the NKVD in Spain. He lived for several seasons during the war in Barcelona. In fact, it was Eitingon who had Luis Mercader taken to the Soviet consulate to protect him while the fighting in May 1937 lasted. After Orlov's defection in 1938, Eitingon, who acted under the pseudonym General Kotov, was in charge of the NKVD mission in Spain. There has been frequent speculation about whether Caridad Mercader and Eitingon—seven years her junior—were lovers. Gorkin stated this emphatically. Historians such as Robert Conquest and Hugh Thomas spoke in the same vein, while Sudoplátov, head of the Special Operations department of the NKVD during the Second World War, denied it: "... this would have gone against professional good practice. [...] they were good friends but not physically intimate, despite Eitingon's well-earned reputation as a man of numerous affairs with women." Her son, Luis, also denied this: "I do not believe that my mother and Leoníd were lovers. [...] They maintained simply friendly, fraternal relations, typical of communist comrades. That is also exactly the opinion of Eitingón's children." For her part, Mary-Kay Wilmers emphasizes that Eitingon was a womanizer. (Note: In his biography of various members of the Eitingon family published in 2012, The Eitingons.) In any case, Eitingon was responsible for Ramón and Caridad Mercader within the NKVD.

Information about Caridad's situation from mid-1937 onwards is scarce and sometimes contradictory, (Note: In the Salamanca Civil War Archive, personal documents of Caridad Mercader were preserved, but only for the years 1936 and 1937.) almost always being related to Ramón's adventures. It is generally accepted that in the summer of that year, Ramón disappeared from Spain to receive training. This was stated by Luis Mercader, who did not mention where said training took place. Although authors such as Wilmers, Levine or Gorkin maintain that it was in the Soviet Union, the documentation preserved in the FSB indicates that Ramón received his education in France. This coincides with what was stated by Luis Mercader, who maintained that Ramón was in the Soviet Union for the first time in 1960, after leaving prison in Mexico. For his part, in his book Special Tasks, Sudoplátov recounted how, when he was still a simple agent, he murdered the Ukrainian opposition leader Yevhen Konovalets in Rotterdam at the end of May 1938. During his escape to the Soviet Union, he spent 3 weeks in Barcelona, where he would have met Ramón Mercader. In the summer of that year, Eitingon sent Ramón to Paris from Barcelona. There, Eitingon assigned him to infiltrate the French Trotskyist organizations. Although Stalin had not yet given the order to assassinate Trotsky, the NKVD had begun to prepare the operation, although Mercader was not yet directly involved in the matter. León Trotsky, who had been one of Lenin's most faithful collaborators, had lived in exile in Mexico since January 1937, after being forced to leave Norway due to pressure from the Soviet government. Thanks to the efforts of the American Trotskyists through Diego Rivera, the Mexican president Lázaro Cárdenas had agreed to grant him asylum.

According to the testimony of Clemence Béranger, (Note: Clemence was the wife, or sister, of Daniel Béranger, a French NKVD agent who in 1939 was under Eitingon in Paris. He lived in the French capital and had been Montserrat Mercader's boyfriend.) Ramón would have moved to Paris—where his mother had been for "some time"—on some undetermined date in 1938. Instructed by Eitingon, Ramón had to seduce Sylvia Ageloff, an American social worker and Trotskyist, who he would use to introduce himself into Trotsky's environment. Ramón Mercader used the false identity of Jacques Mornard, the supposed son of a Belgian diplomat. Ageloff arrived in Paris at the end of June 1938, on vacation and taking advantage of the trip to attend the founding meeting of the Fourth International (Cuarta Internacional). She did not know that her chance meeting with Mornard-Mercader had been arranged by Soviet intelligence. Mercader seduced Sylvia Ageloff and continued his relationship with her until she left for New York in February 1939. From then on, they continued writing to each other, which did not prevent Ramón from trying other ways of getting closer to Trotsky's circle. After Trotsky's murder, Frida Kahlo declared that she had met Mercader during her stay in Paris (January–April 1939). He would have asked her to help him find a house near Trotsky's home in Coyoacán, on the outskirts of Mexico City, which Kahlo refused to do.

For her part, although her children Montserrat and Luis also lived in Paris, Caridad did not stay with them. Ramón, for his part, lived with his partner, Lena Imbert. Initially, Luis lived with Montserrat and her husband, who had previously returned from Spain. (Note: Luis believed that it was due to some type of disagreement with Marty.) Later, in mid-1938, Caridad forced Luis to go live at Daniel Béranger's mother's house. Luis and his mother saw each other about twice a month. In March 1939, Caridad arranged with Eitingon to transfer her son Luis to the Soviet Union, anticipating the start of the Second World War.

== Intervention in the assassination of Trotsky: Operation Utka (Duck) ==
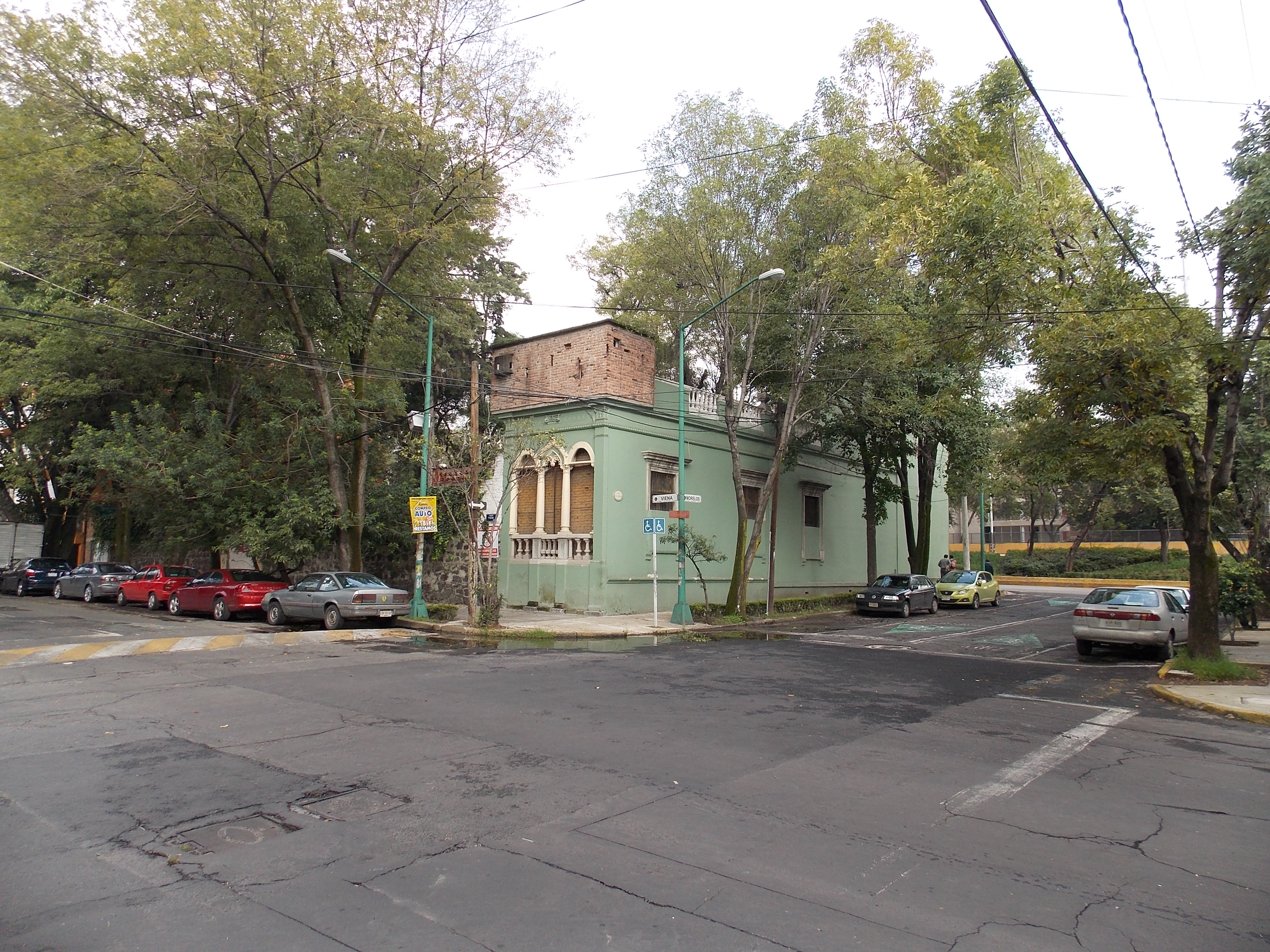
Trotsky's house in Coyoacán, currently the León Trotsky House Museum.

In March 1939, Sudoplatov, already director of the Special Operations Department, received an explicit order from Stalin to assassinate Trotsky. Eitingon, who had just arrived in Moscow, planned Operation Utka (Duck) on Sudoplatov's orders. The plan was not outlined until July and only in early August was it personally approved by Stalin. Operation Utka comprised several operations made up of Spanish and Mexican communists recruited during the Spanish Civil War. One of them was led by the Mexican muralist David Siqueiros and had the objective of assassinating the exiled leader; the other was made up of Caridad and Ramón Mercader. This was to be responsible only for surveillance and information collection. The participation of mother and son was anticipated from the first version of the plan.

In the early summer of 1939, Eitingon traveled to Paris, accompanied by Sudoplátov from the Soviet Union, and spent a couple of months training Caridad and Ramón. Both traveled to New York at the end of August. (Note: Luis, however, gave the date as May 1940, provided by his mother, without her specifying whether she was accompanied or not. According to Sudoplátov, Eitingon traveled in October, when he was able to obtain the necessary documentation to leave France.) The outbreak of World War II caused orders to be given from Moscow to suspend the transfer of Eitingon and the Mercader to America, (Note: According to Luis Mercader.) but these orders were not followed. From New York, it is believed that Caridad traveled to Mexico via Cuba. Ramón stayed a few weeks in New York before moving to Mexico in early October, from where he convinced Sylvia Ageloff to join him—although it is not really known when he actually arrived in Mexico, since there is little information about the period from December 1939–May 1940. (Note: The Mexican journalist Juan Alberto Cedillo, in his work Los Nazis en México (2007) (The Nazis in Mexico), gives the date September 1939, stating that Caridad Mercader and Eitingon traveled to the Aztec country on that date to supervise Siqueiros' team. This date, however, contradicts both Sudoplátov's testimony and the documentation preserved in the FSB, which both cite the difficulties that Eitingon had in leaving France as a consequence of the start of the Second World War.) (Note: Cited by Lev Voroviev.)

From documentation in FSB possession, (Note: Cited by Lev Voroviev.) it is known that Eitingon, after spending some time in New York, also traveled to Mexico, and that Caridad, who was also in Mexico, left the country and temporarily returned to New York with a stopover in Cuba after having been recognized. The trip happened on May 21. Early in the morning of May 23 to 24, a group of gunmen, led by Siqueiros, attacked Trotsky's house in Coyoacán without even wounding him.

Eitingon had to report the failure of the operation. The news reached Moscow through a message carried by courier to New York and relayed in code from there to the Soviet capital. Upon receiving the message, Stalin became enraged and sent for Sudoplátov and Beria, who explained to him that the alternative plan would be implemented. However, Caridad Mercader's role in the new operation appears secondary, and it is unknown what specifically her part was within the operation. Ramón had been in Mexico for several months, under a false identity and as Sylvia Ageloff's boyfriend, and had dedicated himself solely to collecting information, without having personally met Trotsky. A few days after the failed attempt carried out by Siqueiros' group, Ramón Mercader finally met Trotsky through his relationship with Ageloff. At the end of June, he traveled to New York for ten days to receive instructions. A few days after Ramon returned to Mexico, Caridad also returned. After several months in which Ramón cultivated the relationship with the exiled leader, on August 20, 1940, Ramon entered Trotsky's house and managed to meet alone with him, on the pretext of Trotsky's reviewing an article Ramón had written. There Ramón struck Trotsky on the head with an ice axe. According to Sudoplátov, initially Eitingon and Caridad Mercader had planned an attack on Trotsky's house at the time Ramón was inside. Ramon would take advantage of the confusion to shoot at his target. Ramón disagreed with the plan and decided to take it upon himself to assassinate Trotsky alone. (Note: Luis Mercader also supported Sudoplátov's version, stating that his brother revealed to him that he had offered to carry out the murder.)

Trotsky would die the next day. According to the agreed-upon plan, Caridad Mercader and Eitingon were waiting for Ramón near Trotsky's fortress house in a car—other sources speak of two cars—to help him escape. They realized that the attack had failed as soon as they observed the tumult and heard the police sirens without Ramón having come out. They quickly fled the scene and left the country. However, according to the testimony of Ramón Mercader's later lawyer, Eduardo Ceniceros, it was Caridad who, before illegally leaving the country, made the necessary arrangements for her son to receive legal assistance. The chosen one, at the suggestion of Lombardo Toledano, was Octavio Medellín Ostos. Caridad did not reveal the identity of Trotsky's alleged murderer or that he was her son: "Look, counselor, what this boy has done. He is the son of a dear comrade who is outside of Mexico, and I, because of that friendship with his mother, have come to request that you take charge of his defense. (Note: Ceniceros, Ostos's assistant, who would take charge of Mercader's defense upon his death, met with her; He had met Caridad Mercader, at the request of the Mexican communist leaders, during his first stay in Mexico, in 1936.)

== In the Soviet Union ==
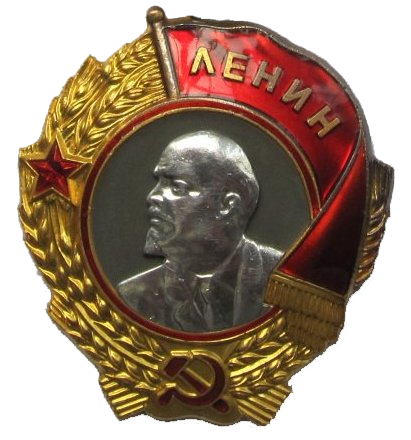
Badge of the Order of Lenin. It was awarded to Caridad Mercader in 1941, after her arrival in the Soviet Union.

Caridad Mercader and Eitingon traveled to Cuba from Mexico and remained there in hiding. Versions of documentation from the FSB and the Sudoplátov archives differ on some points, such as on the route that Eitingon followed after leaving Cuba, but agree on Caridad. According to Sudoplátov, both remained in Cuba for 6 months, which is consistent with the time it took to arrive in the Soviet Union. From there they maintained contact with Ramón through the lawyers who were in charge with his defense. Ofelia Domínguez Navarro, a Cuban jurist, writer and communist activist, was part of Ramón Mercader's defense team in Mexico. According to her 1971 memoir, 50 años de mi vida (50 Years of My Life), she was secretly hired in Havana by a mysterious Spanish woman who could have been Caridad Mercader herself. However, from this point on, the versions differ. The FSB documentation states that Eitingon would have left Caridad in Cuba and arrived in the Soviet Union with a stopover in Europe. (Note: Luis Mercader spoke in the same sense, stating that, according to Caridad's testimony, she would not have traveled with Eitingon.) Sudoplátov, on the other hand, narrated that both left Cuba heading to New York, that they crossed the country to California, where Eitingon contacted the agents he had recruited during his mission in the United States, and who from San Francisco crossed the Pacific by boat and arrived in Moscow on the Trans-Siberian Railway. The route followed by Caridad according to the FSB files is similar. (Note: According to Luis, Caridad crossed the Pacific by boat from San Francisco to Vladivostok and from there to Moscow on the Trans-Siberian Railway. According to Wilmers, who also maintains that Caridad and Eitingon traveled together, after spending time in Cuba, they both traveled to New York. After crossing the country, they took a boat to Shanghai, and by rail, passing through Harbin, they arrived in Moscow on the Trans-Siberian Railway. There are more implausible versions such as that of Eduardo Ceniceros, Ramón Mercader's lawyer, who stated that Caridad left Mexico immediately. after the murder, heading to Japan. In Yokohama she was detained and deported to Hong Kong, arriving from there to the USSR.)

On June 17, Lavrenti Beria, the director of the NKVD, organized a grand reception during which the president of the Presidium of the Supreme Soviet of the Soviet Union, Mikhail Kalinin, decorated Caridad Mercader with the Order of Lenin. She was the first foreign woman to obtain it. The star of Hero of the Soviet Union was reserved for Ramón. Caridad received an apartment that, by Moscow standards, was a luxury; She lived there with her son Luis, who had been in the country for almost 2 years. However, they were only able to be together for a few months because, when the German invasion of the Soviet Union occurred, they had to separate again. Luis enlisted in the Red Army after acquiring Soviet citizenship, necessary to join the militia.

Despite the persistent requests made by the exiles to enlist and thus defend the Soviet Union, the homeland of socialism, the initial response was negative, both because they were foreigners and because of the future need to use these cadres in their countries of origin. At the insistence of the exiles—not only the Spaniards—in July 1941, they were allowed to enlist in a military unit under the Special Operations department of the NKVD: the Independent Motorized Brigade of Specially Designated Shooters (OMSBON), which eventually reached 20,000 members. This unit comprised volunteers from different countries and was one of the units in charge of the defense of Moscow, as well as maintaining order in the city. Within the OMSBON, a company was created, the Fourth, made up of just over 100 Spanish volunteers. During the siege of Moscow, the "Spanish" company protected the center of the city, without actually engaging in combat. Luis Mercader, who in August was assigned as a transmission officer, and several Spanish exiles—among them Lena Imbert and África de las Heras—enlisted in this company. Caridad spent a few weeks with them at the company's training camp, but, according to the memoirs of Sebastià Piera, a PSUC activist, she disappeared before the end of the battle of Moscow. Her son Luis had several assignments but returned to the capital on several occasions—at the beginning of 1942 and during the summer of that year. According to his testimony, his mother continued living in his apartment. In February 1943, Luis was demobilized and began to study engineering in Moscow, returning to live with Caridad.

According to Dimitrov's diary, Caridad remained there until the end of 1944 and worked in the French service of the Soviet foreign radio. Living with her was Lena Imbert, her son's companion, who died of tuberculosis in April 1944 in the sanatorium where Dr. Carlos Díez Fernández worked. The PCE leadership denied the existence of tuberculosis among the Spanish emigrants. Luis Mercader, however, gave the date of 1943 for Lena Imbert's death and stated that, after time in a sanatorium, she died in Caridad's house.

When she walked down the street
everyone looked at her. And I asked her:
—Why are they looking at you?
—They have looked at me all my life. Always.
I'm already accustomed.
She had a penetrating, dominating look
and that was surely what impressed people.
I have a photo of [her...] when she arrived in Russia in 1940.
She was forty-eight years old and weighed 82 kilos.
Tall, powerful, and very elegant.
She had great taste and was always well dressed.
I remember her in her nylon stockings from Dupont,
which had just been invented, and brown snakeskin
high-heeled shoes.
—Luis Mercader about his mother
(between 1941 and 1945).

During her stay in the Soviet Union, Caridad Mercader had deep disagreements with Dolores Ibárruri, La Pasionaria. The two clashed in two areas. On the one hand, Caridad supported Jesús Hernández and Enrique Castro Delgado, who, after the death of José Díaz, would confront Ibárruri to take control of the PCE. According to Luis Mercader, Hernández and Castro Delgado "came by the house every day, and the three of them spent many hours talking." In fact, according to Enrique Líster's testimony, when he and the rest of the military leaders who had initially supported Hernández —Modesto and Cordón—expressed their support for the new general secretary, Pasionaria, Caridad Mercader and Carmen Parga—Manuel Tagüeña's wife—directed bitter criticism towards them: "[Our closeness to Dolores] has subjected us to being told to our face that we have lost our communist balls". The other area of disagreement was the participation of Spanish exiles in NKVD operations. While Pasionaria did not always agree with the discretionary use that the Soviet espionage services made of the Spanish exiles—especially the PSUC—without consulting the PCE, Caridad was a determined defender of Soviet espionage and believed that everything they asked for had to be done, since the Soviet Union was the "Mother Country". One of the Spanish exiles enlisted in the NKVD was Sebastià Piera, who had the endorsement of Caridad Mercader herself for his enlistment. (Note: On the recommendation of Caridad Mercader, Sudoplátov recruited him at the end of the summer of 1943 to lead the Guadalajara operation. Their objective was to infiltrate behind German lines, kill the German military governor of Vilna and kidnap Esteban Infantes, commander of the División Azul (Blue Division). However, the advance of Soviet troops forced the Germans to withdraw from the area and cancel the operation.) Piera described Caridad Mercader like this during her years in the Soviet Union: "...an exceptional woman who felt psuquera [a member of the PSUC, Partit Socialista Unificat de Catalunya] and very linked to Catalonia. Whenever she could, she invited us for a meal and cooked for the Catalans."

Based on the information that Enrique Castro Delgado would have provided him in 1960, Julián Gorkin attributed to Caridad Mercader various missions commissioned by the NKVD, such as participation in the failed attack carried out by Soviet espionage against Franz von Papen, ambassador of Nazi Germany in Turkey on February 24, 1942. Her son Luis, who remained in Moscow for most of the war, maintained the opposite: that Caridad did not participate in any NKVD mission, "among other things because she was burned out by her work." (Note: The person involved in the operation in Turkey and in others cited by Castro Delgado would have been Julia Rodríguez Daniliesvskaya, a young Spanish-Russian woman, granddaughter of the writer Grigori Danilievski and daughter of a Spanish republican colonel, who was part of the NKVD.) (Note: In his memoir Testimony of Two Wars, published in Mexico in 1973.)

According to Luis Mercader, in the period between her stay at the OMSBON and her departure from the country, "Caridad spent her days sitting in bed, dressed, with pillows behind her back, her cigarette in her mouth, drinking coffee after coffee, and knitting." In complete contrast, Castro also attributed Caridad with missions in Sweden, Norway, Denmark, Holland and Belgium, in which she would have been involved in the murder of about thirty people. Likewise, on behalf of the NKVD, she would have monitored the leaders of the Bulgarian communist party refugees in the Soviet Union, many of whom would have ended up being executed. Sudoplátov placed Caridad Mercader in Tashkent between 1941 and 1943, something that was flatly denied by her son Luis.

Various testimonies attested to Caridad Mercader having intervened so Spanish exiles could leave the Soviet Union. Manuel Tagüeña asserted that Caridad helped Spaniards who wanted to leave the country to join the NKVD, thus enabling them to leave the Soviet Union. (Note: In his memoir Testimony of Two Wars, published in Mexico in 1973.) Dr. Díez Fernández himself, who attended to most of the Spanish colony in Moscow, was one of them. Castro Delgado corroborated this testimony, stating that, after the defeat of Hernández and his own in the struggle for power in the Spanish Communist Party, he was purged in the summer of 1944. Despite his expulsion from the party, Caridad provided him with help and was one of the people who interceded for him so that he could leave the Soviet Union, since the leadership of the PCE refused to let him leave the country. He did not manage to do so until the end of 1945.

On the other hand, and according to her son's testimony, at this time Caridad resorted to scenes of great drama: "From time to time my mother would get hysterical and say unimaginable things, screaming that she was going to kill herself, and I had to take the gun from her." However, Luis also suspected that this could be a tactic to pressure the Soviet authorities to concern themselves with the fate of her son Ramón. In these years, a rumor also spread that Caridad had begun to use drugs again, which were given to her, under prescription, by Dr. Díez Fernández, who had treated Lena Imbert and visited the house regularly. During the war, her daughter Montserrat remained in France, where she worked for communist organizations of the French Resistance. Jorge, who also remained in France, fell ill with osteomyelitis. When he headed with his wife to the Soviet Union for treatment, Hitler began Operation Barbarossa. The couple was crossing Germany at the time, and Jorge was arrested and interned in a German concentration camp, where he would spend the next four years, until the end of the war.

Finally, in February 1945, Caridad received authorization to leave the Soviet Union. (Note: According to Luis, who would have acted as courier to carry the letters that Caridad wrote to Stalin himself, it was difficult for her to obtain permission, but in the end "she created so many scandals that they allowed it.") At this point Caridad was "very thin and emaciated." She had lost 34 kilos of weight since her arrival 4 years before.

Gorkin included in his book on the assassination of Trotsky the confidences that Caridad Mercader would have made to Castro Delgado during the period before her departure from the Soviet Union: "They have deceived us, Enrique. [...] This is the worst hell that has ever existed. I will never be able to get used to it. I have only one desire, one thought: to flee, to flee away from here. [...] They annihilate your will, they force you to kill and then make you die, with a blow or a shot, or over a slow fire, as they make me die at this moment. Now they don't need me anymore, you understand?" She then confessed her participation and that of her son in the murder of Trotsky: "I have made Ramón a murderer [...] of my poor Luis, a hostage, and of my other two sons pure ruins. And what has been my reward in exchange for that? Pieces of Rubbish! [in reference to the medal of the Order of Lenin and the Hero of the Soviet Union awarded to Ramón]." According to Castro Delgado, shortly before Caridad left the country, Luis Mercader would have confessed his displeasure at the act: "My mother is going to Cuba, and then she will undoubtedly appear in Mexico, but she sacrifices me by leaving me here. She knows, however, that I hate all of this and that I would give half my life to leave. I have no illusions; I will never be able to leave the Soviet Union." On the other hand, Luis denied in his book his condition as a hostage, maintaining that his situation in the Soviet Union was always advantageous, which allowed him to develop his vocation as an engineer, something that satisfied him much more than the tasks to which his mother and brother dedicated themselves. In fact, Luis was happy to see his mother leave: "When I found out that my mother was going to leave, I was very happy. For me it was like a liberation." (Note: All this information, supposedly provided to Castro Delgado by Caridad Mercader, was not captured by him in his book about his stay in the Soviet Union, My Faith Was Lost in Moscow, published in 1951. It was in 1960, with Ramón Mercader already out of prison, when he claimed to have changed his mind: "My wife and I had contracted a debt of gratitude to Caridad. In a time of great misery in Moscow, she helped us survive. In addition, she interceded a lot so that we could leave the USSR when we were in great danger, really between Lubyanka and the border. Did I have the right to behave badly? Now I can talk; everything has changed.") According to Gorkin, it was finally Beria himself, the director of the NKVD, who authorized Caridad's departure, on the condition that she settle in Cuba. Caridad ignored it and once outside the USSR traveled, via Turkey, to Mexico.

== Return to México: Operation Gnome ==
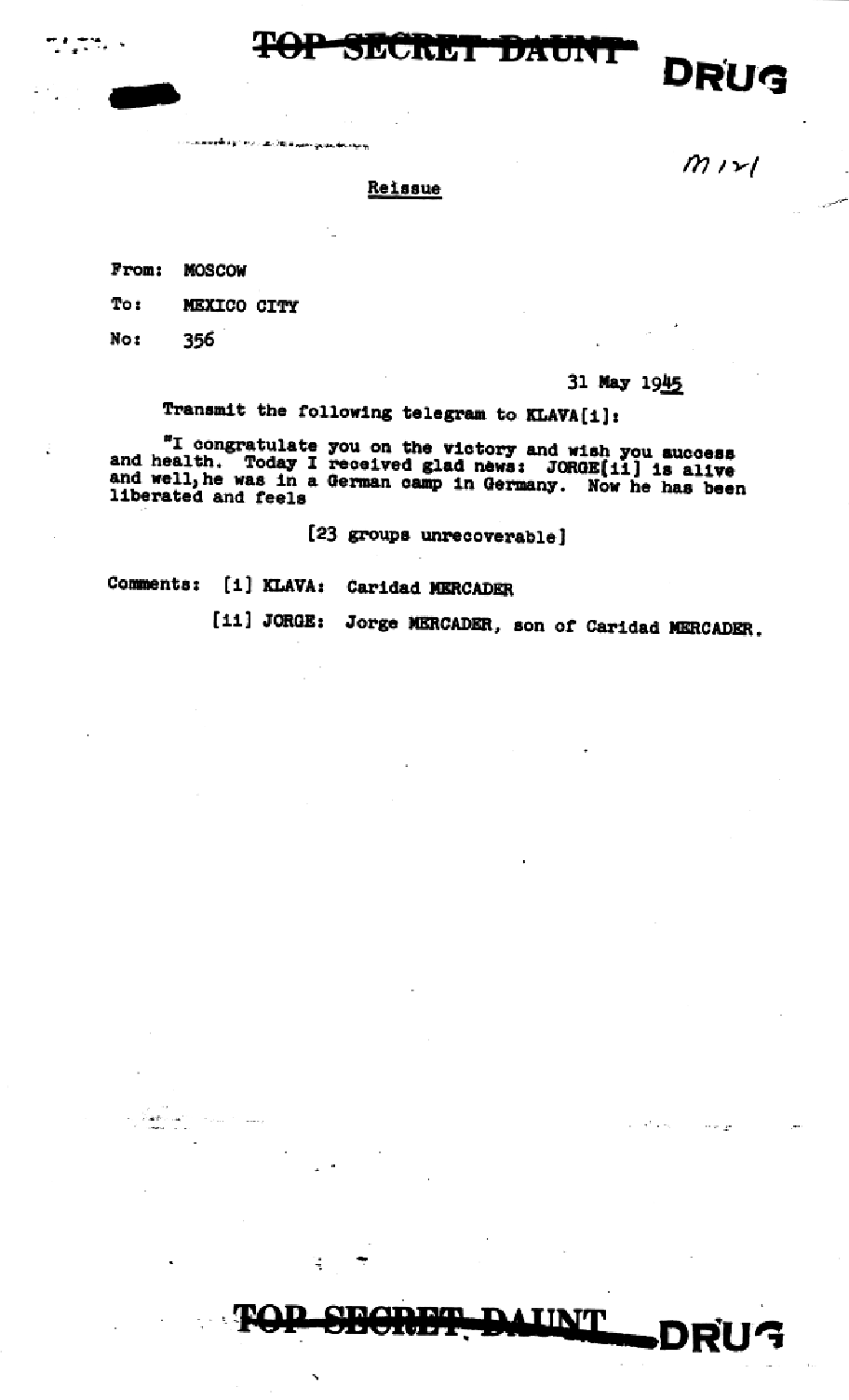
Message received by the NKVD rezidentura (Soviet base of operation for resident spies) in Mexico on May 31, 1945. It reported that Jorge Mercader, son of Caridad, had been liberated from a German prisoner of war camp.

During 1943, Stalin decided to try to get Ramón Mercader out of prison and ordered an operation to be prepared to achieve this. The first references to the plan date back to May 30 of that year. At the end of the year, the Soviet Union opened an embassy in Mexico, which provided legal cover for the NKVD station—rezidentura, in Soviet terminology—in that country. Its main objectives were two: to provide cover for the espionage operations that the Soviets were developing to obtain the secrets of the American atomic bomb and to get Mercader out of prison. The operation, Code Name Gnome, the name assigned to Mercader, studied various strategies for Mercader to escape from prison, in which Soviet agents and Mexican and Spanish communists exiled in the country had to intervene. In the summer of 1943, before the opening of the diplomatic legation, Jesús Hernández—code name "Pedro"—was sent to Mexico along with Francisco Antón. In addition to the tasks related to the reorganization of the PCE in the American country—also part of his attempt to take control of the party, succeeding the recently deceased José Díaz as general secretary—Hernández also worked for the NKVD and aimed to reinforce the work of the rezidentura in Mexico and the operations it carried out. (Note: At a time when, due to the need to strengthen the Soviet relationship with the Allies, Stalin had dissolved the Comintern, it was natural that the former members of the Communist International apparatus went to work for the NKVD.)

At the end of 1943, the Soviet rezident (resident spy) designed a plan by which Mercader could escape during one of the releases from prison to testify in court. Taking advantage of a reduction in the guards that were to guard him, Mercader would be put in a car and taken out of the country. Eitingon, under the code name "Tom", was to coordinate the plan. (Note: Hernández's support work suffered interference from internal struggles within the PCE, with Hernández the loser. In the spring of 1944 the conflict between Hernández and the supporters of Dolores Ibárruri exploded in Mexico. Although the NKVD tried to mediate so as not to endanger Gnome, Hernández was finally expelled from the PCE in July. Even so, Hernández continued to collaborate with the NKVD, although the failure of the operation could not be avoided.) The operation, which took place during 1944 and early 1945, was a fiasco. Added to the incompetence, mistrust, and quarrels among the Soviet, Spanish, and Mexican agents was the unexpected arrival of Caridad Mercader to Mexico in March 1945. She personally embarked on a series of negotiations with Mexican authorities to obtain her son's the freedom. According to Ceniceros, mother and son were even able to see each other in person outside the prison. From the beginning, the NKVD made clear its discomfort with Caridad's presence in the country. Among the first messages between Mexico and the Soviet Union, assigned the code name "Klava", dating from March 1945: "From now on, consider that the presence of Klava [Caridad Mercader] in the CAMPIÑA [Mexico] greatly complicates Project Gnome." Gorkin goes further, stating that the NKVD field team made two attempts to kill her—whether real or fake is unknown—in order to scare her into leaving the country.

The appearance on the scene of Caridad Mercader and her efforts would have alerted the Mexican authorities, who tightened Ramón's prison regimen, thus attempts to achieve his escape would have been unsuccessful. As Luis explained, "[Caridad] knew many important people there [...] and, probably, she went appealing from one to another. But what she did was raise hell, and as a consequence, everything that had been organized collapsed." As a result, the Soviets ordered Caridad to leave Mexico immediately, and no further attempts were made to free from prison Ramón Mercader, who had to serve his full sentence of 20 years. Almost all the authors who have dealt with the subject, like Ramón himself, attributed the failure, in whole or in part, to Caridad's presence there. Ramón never forgave his mother for her interference in the operation and considered her responsible for the additional period he had to spend in prison: "I had to spend 16 years in prison because of her." However, he never blamed her to her face.

== Relationship with her son ==
Numerous historians and publicists have presented Caridad Mercader as a fanatical person who pushed her son to murder. Leonardo Padura (Note: Author of El grito de Trotski (2013) (Trotsky's Scream), a novel in which he recounts his murder.) described Caridad in the following way:

Caridad del Río had not only been the one who indoctrinated her son in hatred and put him in contact with the officers of the gloomy Soviet NKVD, in charge of conceiving and executing the murder, but she encouraged him, and he continued his mission until that same afternoon of August 20, when aboard a car and in the company of the creator of the plan, she saw Ramón Mercader enter Trotsky's house and into the sewers of the history of the century.

Gorkin made a similar analysis when he first stated that "a dark police apparatus turned Caridad into a terrorist, the mother of a murderer," adding that Ramón was sacrificed to the "blind fanaticism she professed." The description would be corroborated with the confidences that, according to Castro Delgado, Caridad had made to him during her stay in the Soviet Union: "I have made Ramón a murderer."

Luis Mercader, however, provided a totally different version. According to the youngest of the Mercader, Caridad would not have had a great influence on Ramón or on any of her children, because, in reality, she lived with them for a short time. He also cited how his brother had told him that it was he who volunteered to commit the murder, simply to help Eitingon accomplish his mission.

For his part, Gregorio Luri points out a novel thesis to justify Caridad's recruiting her son, which ultimately put him on the path to committing an assassination. According to Luri, Caridad recruited her son to keep him away from the front so that he would not suffer the fate of his brother Pablo, who died in combat action a few weeks earlier.

== Final years ==
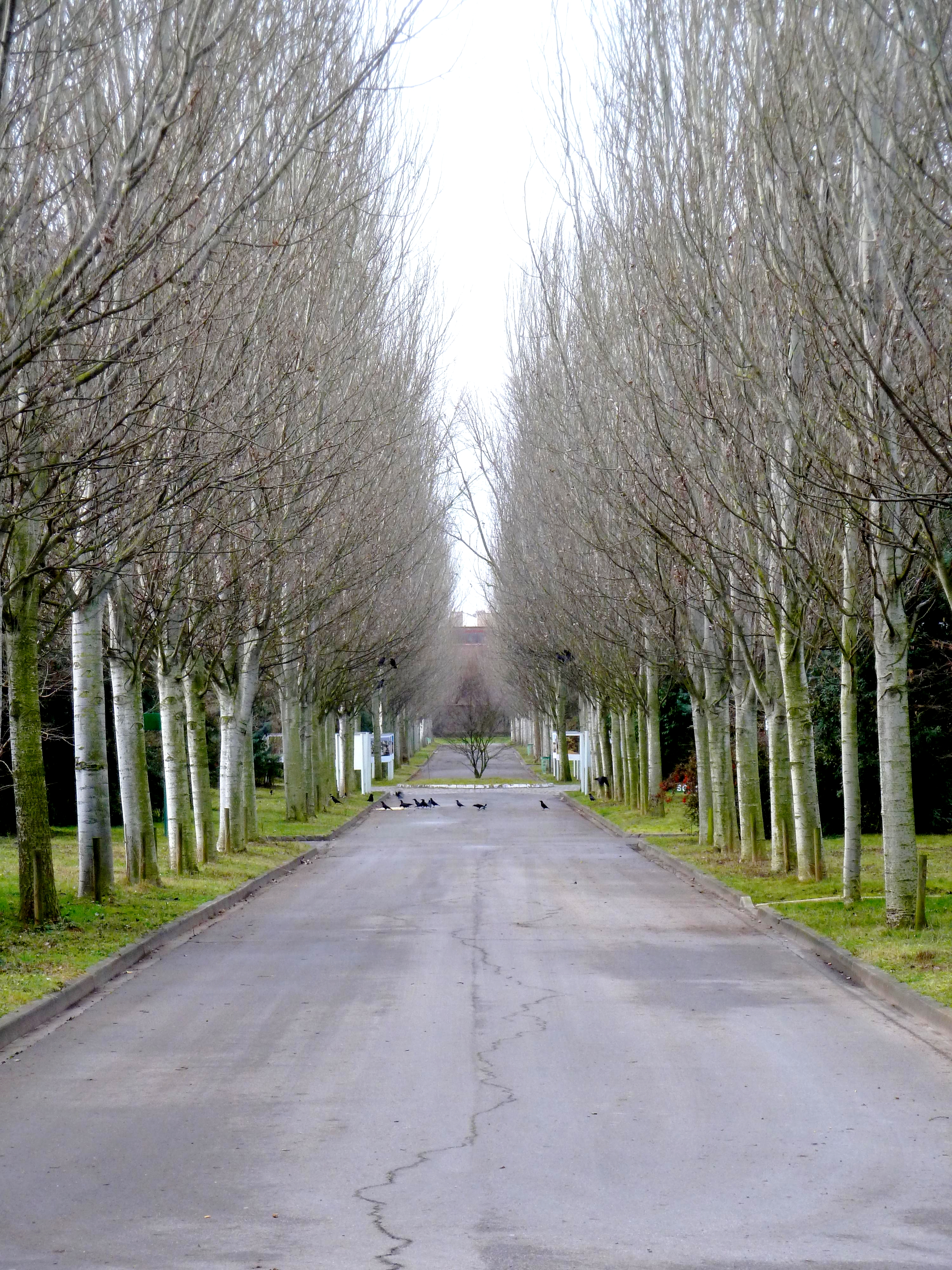
Parisian cemetery of Pantin, where Caridad Mercader was buried in 1975.

Caridad left Mexico in November 1945, and received authorization to settle in Paris, where she lived with a Cuban passport until her death. She settled in an apartment at 25 Rennequin Street, near the Arc de Triomphe and received a pension from the Soviet government throughout her life. Her children Jorge and Montserrat, whom she saw regularly, also lived in the French capital. There are photos of Caridad giving a baby bottle to Jean, Montserrat's son, in 1963.

After the Cuban Revolution, musician Harold Gramatges was appointed Cuban ambassador to France and hired Caridad Mercader to direct public relations at the Cuban embassy in Paris. She worked there between 1960 and 1967. According to her son Luis, "she organized receptions, protocols, and received dignitaries from France and other countries," as Gramatges himself told him in 1978. However, in his memoirs, Vidas para leerlas (Lives to Be Read), the Cuban writer Guillermo Cabrera Infante, who was sent to Brussels in 1962 as a cultural advisor to the Cuban embassy, mentions her, alluding to a "dry and unpleasant old woman" who had replaced the previous "beautiful Habanera" (Note: a "habanera" is a woman native of Havana, Cuba.) embassy receptionist. According to Cabrera Infante, Gramatges told her that "Cachita"—alluding to her birth in Santiago de Cuba—was "more Stalinist than Stalin." Luis Goytisolo, who collaborated with the Cuban Revolution at that time, met Caridad Mercader at the Parisian embassy before traveling to Cuba during the Missile Crisis. According to Goytisolo, it was Martha Frayde, Cuba's representative to UNESCO between 1962 and 1965, who revealed to him the identity of the embassy receptionist, asking him to communicate it to the Cuban Minister of Foreign Affairs Raúl Roa. Goytisolo added that Roa, upon learning of the matter, had Caridad return to Cuba. Although there is a photo of Caridad Mercader in Cuba in 1962, Luis Mercader's testimony does not mention that his mother had moved to Cuba for any length of time or that she had been fired from her job at the Cuban embassy. (Note: Curiously, in his book Paris, nid d'espions ("Paris, Nest of Spies"), the French historian Roger Faligot indicates that Montserrat Mercader was the receptionist at the embassy in 1960 and that she collaborated with the Direction de la Surveillance du Territoire (DST), the French counterespionage agency, with the participation of the CIA, to place microphones in the ambassador's residence.)

On May 6, 1960, Ramón Mercader completed his sentence and was able to travel to Moscow with a Czechoslovak passport. There, where his brother Luis continued to live, he settled with his wife Roquelia. From that time Caridad would travel sporadically to the Soviet Union to visit her children and grandchildren. According to her son Luis, she was never able to adapt to life in the Soviet Union and attributed to her the phrase "[I] only serve to destroy capitalism, but I am not useful to build communism." Efforts by her children to make Caridad's visits more comfortable were always to no avail. Luis believed his mother was never able to recognize the failure of communism and that she believed they had fought "for a Utopia". He also added that "[she] returned to Paris sick, completely discouraged and disillusioned". But she stubbornly continued to be a communist, worshipping Stalin and believing in his doctrine.

In the last years of her life, Caridad was cared for by her son Jorge and her daughter-in-law, Germaine. She died in 1975, aged 82, months before the death of the dictator Francisco Franco in Spain. She was buried in the Parisian cemetery of Pantin, in a tomb that she shared with her son-in-law, the husband of her daughter Montserrat. The Soviet embassy in Paris took care of the funeral and burial.

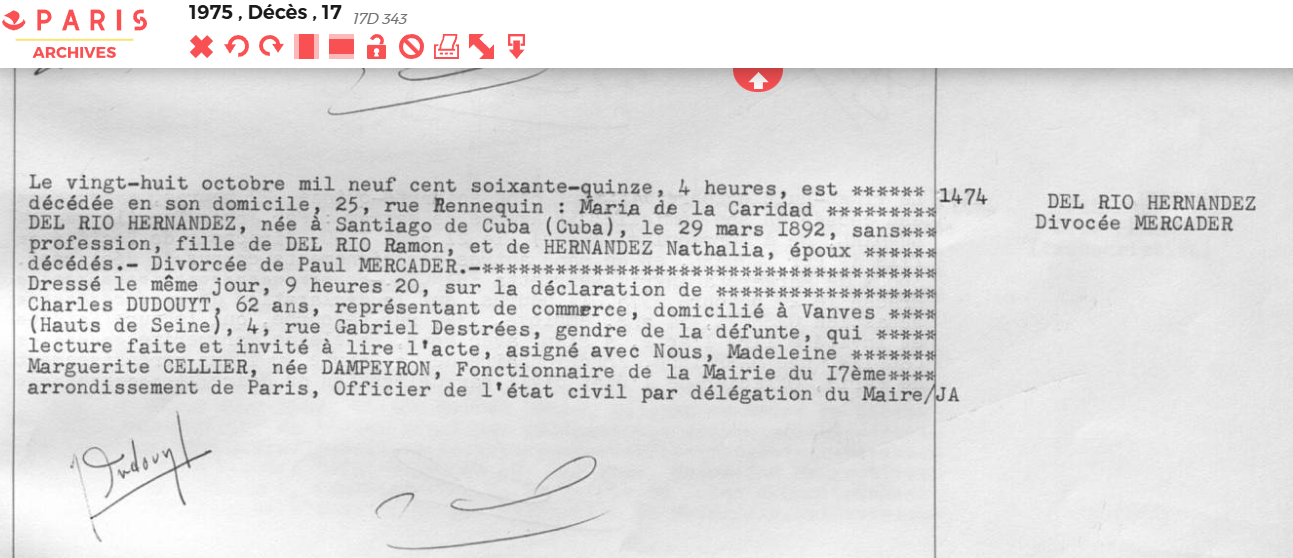

== Bibliography ==
Books

Primary Sources

- Cabrera Infante, Guillermo (1998). Vidas para leerlas. Madrid: Alfaguara. ISBN 84-204-8369-9.
- Cañameras, Jaume (1990). Conversa amb Bartolí (in Catalan). L'Abadia de Montserrat: Biblioteca Serra d'Or. ISBN 84-7826-182-6.
- Cárdenas, Lázaro (2003). Apuntes: una selección. UNAM. ISBN 970-32-0783-9.
- Jacquelin, Andre (1945). Espagne et liberté: le second Munich (in French). Éditions de Kérénac.
- Juárez, Javier (2008). Patria: una española en el KGB (in Spanish). Barcelona: Random House Mondadori. ISBN 978-84-8306-763-5.
- Mercader, Luis; Sánchez, Germán (1990). Ramón Mercader, mi hermano. Cincuenta años después. Madrid: Espasa-Calpe. ISBN 84-239-2228-6.
- Pàmies, Teresa (1975). Cuando éramos capitanes (2nd ed.). Barcelona: DOPESA. ISBN 84-7235-195-5.
- Renton, Dave (2004). Trotsky. London: Haus Publishing. ISBN 1-904341-62-4.
- Ruiz-Funes Montesinos, Concepción; Tuñón, Enrique (1982). "Llegada". Palabras del exilio (2. Final y comienzo: el Sinaia ed.). Instituto Nacional de Antropología e Historia.
- Tagüeña, Manuel (1973). Testimonio de dos guerras. México D.F.: Oasis.
- Wilmers, Mary-Kay (2012). The Eitingons: A Twentieth Century Story. London: Verso Books. ISBN 978-1-84467-911-9.

Secondary Sources

- Aymes, Jean-René (2003). Francia en España, España en Francia: la historia en la relación cultural hispano-francesa (siglos XIX-XX). Salamanca: Universidad de Salamanca. ISBN 978-84-7800-678-6.
- Broué, Pierre; Témime, Emile (2008). The Revolution and the Civil War in Spain. Chicago: Haymarket Books. ISBN 978-1-931859-51-6.
- Cedillo, Juan Alberto (September 2013). Los nazis en México. Random House Mondadori. ISBN 978-607-31-1955-9.
- Consejo Insular de Ibiza y Formetera (2006). "Palerm Vich, Joan Antoni". Enciclopèdia d'Eivissa i Formentera (in Catalan). Consell Insular d'Eivissa i Formentera, Conselleria de Cultura, Educació i Patrimoni. ISBN 978-84-88018-16-8. Archived from the original on 2015-09-23.
- Costa-Amic, Bartomeu (1994). Leon Trotsky y Andreu Nin: Dos asesinatos del stalinismo (aclarando la historia) [Leon Trotsky and Andreu Nin: Two murders of Stalinism (clarifying history)] (in Spanish). San Pedro Cholula, Mexico: Altres-Costa-Amic. ISBN 9789686977059.
- Dimitrov, Georgi (2003). Banac, Ivo (ed.). The Diary of Georgi Dimitrov, 1933-1949. Yale University Press. ISBN 0-300-13385-5.
- Encinas Moral, Ángel Luis (2008). Fuentes históricas para el estudio de la emigración española a la URSS (1937-2007) (PDF). Madrid: Exterior XXI. ISBN 978-84-612-6429-2.
- Gall, Olivia (1991). Trotsky en México. Era. ISBN 968-411-335-8.
- Garmabella, José Ramón (2007). El grito de Trotsky. Barcelona: Debate. ISBN 978-84-8306-696-6.
- Gorkin, Julián (2001). Los asesinos de Trotsky. Contra el estalinismo. Laertes. ISBN 84-7584-468-5. Archived from the original on 2016-03-03.
- Hernández Sánchez, Fernando (2015). Los años de plomo: La reconstrucción del PCE bajo el primer franquismo (1939-1953) (in Spanish) (Kindle ed.). Grupo Planeta. ISBN 978-84-9892-829-7.
- Kergoat, Jacques (1994). Marceau Pivert: socialiste de gauche (in French). Editions de l'Atelier. ISBN 2-7082-3096-4.
- Levine, Isaac Don (1959). The Mind of an Assassin. London: Weidenfeld and Nicolson. ISBN 978-0-7090-2810-9.
- Lines, Lisa Margaret (2011). Milicianas: Women in Combat in the Spanish Civil War. Lexington Books. ISBN 978-0-7391-6494-5.
- Martín Ramos, José Luís (2010). "Pere Ardiaca, 1936-1949". In Giaime Pala; Manuel Moreno; Quim Cornelles (eds.). Pere Ardiaca. Materials per a una biografia (PDF) (in Catalan). Debarris. pp. 31–62. ISBN 978-84-937314-4-1.
- Richardson, William Harrison (1988). Mexico Through Russian Eyes, 1806–1940. University of Pittsburgh Press. ISBN 0-8229-7712-5.
- Royo Campo, Albert (14 June 2013). L'espionatge soviètic (1917–1945): una forma de control social (Thesis) (in Catalan). Lerida, Spain: Universidad de Lérida. hdl:10459.1/46869.
- Sudoplatov, Pavel; Sudoplatov, Anatoly (1994). Special Tasks. The Memoirs of an Unwanted Witness — A Soviet Spymaster. Little, Brown and Company. ISBN 0-316-77352-2.

Newspaper and Magazine Articles

- Alós, Ernest (25 de julio de 2011). «Estos papeles ya no son de Salamanca». El Periódico de Catalunya. Archivado desde el original el 24 de marzo de 2016. Consultado el 26 de abril de 2015.
- Arbal (21 de marzo de 1937). «Caridad Mercader, mujer ejemplar y heroína auténtica». Crónica (Madrid): 5.
- Albertani, Claudio (2008/2009). «Socialismo y Libertad. El exilio antiautoritario de Europa en México y la lucha contra el estalinismo. 1940–1950». Políticas de la Memoria (Centro de Documentación e Investigación de la Cultura de Izquierdas en la Argentina (CeDInCI)) (8/9): 131–139. ISSN 1668-4885. Archivado desde el original el 7 de abril de 2014. Consultado el 2 de abril de 2014.
- Barchino, Matías (2013). «Mujer de terciopelos y armaduras: la mujer nueva y La Pasionaria en la literatura chilena sobre la guerra civil española». Revista Letral – Revista Electrónica de Estudios Transatlánticos de Literatura (Universidad de Granada) (10). ISSN 1989-3302. Archivado desde el original el 22 de octubre de 2014. Consultado el 8 de abril de 2014.
- Bonet Mogica, Lluís (4 de diciembre de 1996). «El asesino de Trotski». La Vanguardia.
- Cangiano, Gustavo (7 de abril de 2010). «Revelaciones exclusivas acerca de cómo la Unión Soviética y los Partidos Comunistas organizaron el asesinato de León Trotsky». Izquierda Nacional. Archivado desde el original el 26 de abril de 2014.
- Cuadriello, Jorge Domingo (octubre–diciembre de 2009). «Reseñas de libros: El hombre que amaba a los perros». Espacio Laical (20). Archivado desde el original el 28 de diciembre de 2013. Consultado el 23 de abril de 2014.
- Fernández, Rodrigo (16 de noviembre de 1997). «Dos españoles quisieron acabar con Trotski antes que Mercader». El País.
- Foundation Pierre-Georges Latécoère (s.f.). «Curriculum Vitae Louis Delrieu». De Latécoère à l'Aéropostale (en francés). Archivado desde el original el 30 de mayo de 2015. Consultado el 28 de abril de 2015.
- García Colín, David (octubre de 2012). «Un mal libro de memorias y el asilo de Trotsky en México». En Corriente Marxista Internacional, ed. La Izquierda Socialista. Archivado desde el original el 7 de abril de 2014.
- Goytisolo, Luis (25 de abril de 2010). «La Habana de un Infante en nada difunto». El País.
- Hernández Sánchez, Fernando (2006). «Jesús Hernández, pistolero, ministro, espía y renegado». Historia 16 (368): 78–89. ISSN 0210-6353.
- Hernández Sánchez, Fernando (agosto de 2008). «Las siete pruebas de Enrique Lister (1907–1994)». Historia 16 (388): 84–101. ISSN 0210-6353.
- Hernández Sánchez, Fernando (15 de enero de 2008). «Los comunistas españoles en México durante la segunda guerra mundial». Seminario: El Exilio y México–España, siglo XX. Centro de Investigaciones Históricas de la Democracia Española.
- Ibartz, Joaquim (28 de julio de 1990). «Diez años para averiguar una identidad». La Vanguardia.
- Levine, Isaac Don (28 de septiembre de 1959). «Secrets of an Assassin». Life (en inglés): 104–122.
- Luri, Gregorio (3 de enero de 2013). «La infiltrada». El Café de Ocata.
- Luri, Gregorio (3 de febrero de 2013). «L'amor perdut de Caritat Mercader». Ara (en catalán).
- Luri, Gregorio (7 de abril de 2013). «Caritat Mercader, una revolucionària amb sabates de pell de serp». Ara (en catalán).
- Luri, Gregorio (24 de enero de 2014). «Caridad, con otra mirada». Ara.
- Marco Igual, Miguel (2009). «Los médicos republicanos españoles exiliados en la Unión Soviética». Medicina & historia: Revista de estudios históricos de las ciencias médicas (1): 1–15. ISSN 0300-8169.
- Massón Sena, Caridad (January–June 2007). "Marinello y la República Española" (PDF). Revista de la Biblioteca Nacional José Martí. Vol. 98, no. 1–2. pp. 131–143. ISSN 0006-1727.
- Mendes de Almeida, Angela (13 de marzo de 2014). «O homem incapaz de matar cachorros». Passa Palavra (en portugués).
- Mercader, Luis (8 de mayo de 1994). «Puntualizaciones al asesinato de Trotski». El País.
- Merchet, Jean-Dominique (9 de noviembre de 2009). «Paris en guerre froide». Libération (en francés).
- Padura, Leonardo (julio-septiembre de 2008). «La última hora de Caridad Mercader». Espacio Laical (15). Archivado desde el original el 28 de diciembre de 2013. Consultado el 6 de abril de 2014.
- Reyes, Luis (11 February 2014). "El más secreto héroe de la Unión Soviética". Tiempo de hoy. No. 1637. pp. 66–69. ISSN 0213-1951. Archived from the original on 22 October 2014.
- Rubio Navarro, Javier (julio-agosto de 2009). «Caridad Mercader». Muy (interesante) Historia (24).
- Sheridan, Guillermo (marzo de 2006). «Rescatando a Mercader (un episodio del espionaje soviético en México)». Letras Libres.
- Valls, Francesc (13 de octubre de 1998). «"Me ha hecho sufrir más la desconfianza que la tortura"». El País.
- Valls, Francesc (12 de marzo de 2014). «Sebastià Piera, histórico del PSUC y soldado de élite». El País.
- Voroviev, Lev (1998). «L'assassinat de Trotsky décrit par ses assassins». Traducido del ruso por Krivine, Jean-Michel (trad.). Critique communiste (en francés). (enlace roto disponible en Internet Archive; véase el historial, la primera versión y la última).

Documentaries

- López-Linares, José Luis; Rioyo, Javier (dir.) (1996). "6). Asaltar los cielos (documental)". España: López-Linares, José Luis, Rioyo, Javier – via YouTube.

External Links

- Caridad Mercader in 1944, before leaving the USSR for Mexico to try to get Ramón out of prison (extracted from Ramón Mercader, my brother. Fifty years later, page 117). https://www.flickr.com/photos/fpereardiaca/2200103594/
