= Eitingon =

Eitingon is a surname. Notable people with the surname include:

- Max Eitingon (1881–1943), Russian-German medical doctor and psychoanalyst
- Nahum Eitingon (1899–1981), Soviet intelligence officer
