= Special Tasks =

Autobiographical work by Pavel Sudoplatov

Special Tasks: The Memoirs of an Unwanted Witness – A Soviet Spymaster
- Author: Pavel Sudoplatov
- Language: English
- Genre: Autobiography
- Publisher: Little, Brown and Company
- Publication date: 1994
- Publication place: United States
- ISBN: 0-316-77352-2

Special Tasks: The Memoirs of an Unwanted Witness – A Soviet Spymaster is the autobiography of Pavel Sudoplatov, who was a member of the intelligence services of the Soviet Union who rose to the rank of lieutenant general.

When it was published in 1994, it caused a considerable uproar for a number of reasons. It also made him well known outside Russia by providing a detailed look at Soviet intelligence and Soviet internal politics during his years at the top. The book also described the Soviet state view on the term "special tasks" which Sudoplatov described as "sabotage, kidnapping and assassination" beyond the USSR's borders. Sudoplatov was known for managing the two plots that led to the assassination of Leon Trotsky.

== Problems and value ==
It is a somewhat problematic work for several reasons. For one, it was based in large part on Sudoplatov's memory, 40 years or more after the events that form the bulk of the book. For another, it was written with the help of his son Anatoli and two American writers, Jerrold and Leona Schecter, with Sudoplatov's contributions being a series of interviews, which the others turned into a book. Finally, the Schecters have produced other works on this topic which are problematic.

John Earl Haynes and Harvey Klehr described the portrayal of atomic espionage by Sudoplatov as a mix of "faulty memories, Soviet intelligence agency disinformation, sloppy citations, misplaced trust in documents provided by unidentified sources under unexplained circumstances, and egregious lapses in logic and judgment."

The book contains a number of incorrect statements. One example is the misidentification of the source codenamed "MLAD"/"MLLAD" as Bruno Pontecorvo, instead of Theodore Hall. Various reasons are possible; for one, as the book was written over 40 years later, Sudoplatov's memory may have been in error. (The transcript of the interview where he made the error records him responding to a question as to whether MLAD was Pontecorvo by saying "I think so; Yes.") Also, Hall was at the time unknown in the West, and Sudoplatov may have wished to protect him. Other misstatements have been attributed to a desire on the part of Sudoplatov, who never changed his allegiance, to cause trouble in the West.

Still, the book contains a great deal of material that is of value, and even critics who note its problems feel that it has considerable value. For instance, Alexei Kojevnikov wrote, "Sudoplatov is quite reliable when he writes about his own unit, subordinates and, probably, agents directly connected to it and their assignments."

Overall, details inside view of the Soviet intelligence agencies during their golden era and of the power struggles at the top of the Soviet system during and just after the death of Stalin.

== Atomic espionage controversy ==
The principal source of controversy that it engendered was its statement that a number of Western scientists, including Niels Bohr, Robert Oppenheimer, Enrico Fermi and others allegedly provided the Soviets with information regarding the Manhattan Project, which has been deeply disputed. While a number of Soviet atomic spies are attested to have stolen information from the American Manhattan Project, they were largely not the ones named by Sudoplatov. Sudoplatov also asserted the existence of an apocryphal "Department S" backed by direct order of Lavrentiy Beria that he described as possibly more powerful than it was, if it existed.

At times Sudoplatov contradicts facts directly, such as when he claimed Leo Szilard and his secretary passed information to the Soviets, when Szilard did not have a secretary, and claiming that Szilard worked at Los Alamos when he was working at the University of Chicago helping build the first nuclear reactor in December 1942 with Enrico Fermi.

At other times, the dispute is about potentially subtle points: there is no question, for instance, that Bohr met with a Soviet intelligence agent and discussed atomic questions with him in a nonsecret meeting, which was reported in a press release by Bohr's son Aage in April, 1994. The issue is whether anything he said was not merely a repetition of information that was already public and how much help (if any) Bohr's statements were to the Soviet atomic program. The fact that so many people were involved in creating the text may have subtly changed the meaning of Sudoplatov's statements, which would be a problem when treating such a diffuse topic.

The "Atomic Spies" chapter of Special Tasks rehashed old historical controversies and claims, such as Oppenheimer being questioned in the 1950s for Communist leanings, on which to base its accusations. Historian Richard Rhodes described the book as Sudoplatov continuing his Cold War career except in the form of character assassination.

According to Sudoplatov's claims that have been challenged, five spy rings for the Soviet Union were targeting the United States during World War II: he said that one was based in Amtorg in New York City, one in the Soviet Embassy in the United States at Washington, D.C., one in the Soviet Consulate General in San Francisco, one in Mexico City and ran by Vasilevsky, and also that an Akhmerov-led ring targeted CPUSA members for the Kremlin's needs.

Sudoplatov also claimed the existence of a de facto Soviet safe house, Zook's Drugstore in Santa Fe, New Mexico, that first played a role in the first Trotsky assassination plot by Iosef Grigulevich, and later continued use as a base for atomic espionage in New Mexico. According to historian E.B. Held, this may have been disinformation on Sudoplatov's part to boost his accusations against Oppenheimer, who Sudoplatov claimed was codenamed STAR. American counterintelligence transcripts show that the identities of MLLAD and STAR were Theodore Hall and Saville Sax respectively. Held suggests that pieces of disinformation in Sudoplatov's memoir in 1994 may have been a reason why the Venona project was declassified in 1995.

Nonetheless, Sudoplatov also refuted an apocryphal assertion originating from KGB writers, that of the existence of the alleged spy Perseus. Sudoplatov stated that Perseus was merely a cover name over multiple identities of Soviet agents or assets. The book also confirmed that Julius and Ethel Rosenberg had worked for Soviet intelligence although it argued that their role was not very important.

== Other subjects ==
However, the material on the atomic espionage is only a small part of the book, which also details many Soviet intelligence operations, mostly those with which Sudoplatov had personal involvement. For the period after Sudoplatov's arrival in Moscow, it also discusses the political machinations, both inside the intelligence services and at the top of the Soviet government.

For instance, the events surrounding the falls of Nikolai Yezhov and Lavrentii Beria are given in considerable detail, as are the events in the Soviet Union leading up to World War II and Joseph Stalin's reaction to the outbreak of the war.

== Other reactions ==
The controversy around the atomic information charges led to questions about who had written the book and whether Sudoplatov had deliberately made misrepresentations.

A number of parties, including Russia's own Foreign Intelligence Service, contended that Sudoplatov exaggerated his own role in his autobiography. Members of the Soviet atomic bomb project felt that Sudoplatov's claims about the amount of information provided to them by Soviet intelligence denigrated the scientists' role in the creation of Soviet atomic bombs.

== See also ==
- Active measures
- Mitrokhin Archive
- Soviet espionage in the United States
- Venona project
