= Assassination of Leon Trotsky =

1940 murder in Mexico City, Mexico

Assassination of Leon Trotsky (Note: According to Pavel Sudoplatov, known within the NKVD as Operation Utka (Russian: Операция Утка, romanized: Operatsiya Utka, lit. 'Operation Duck'))
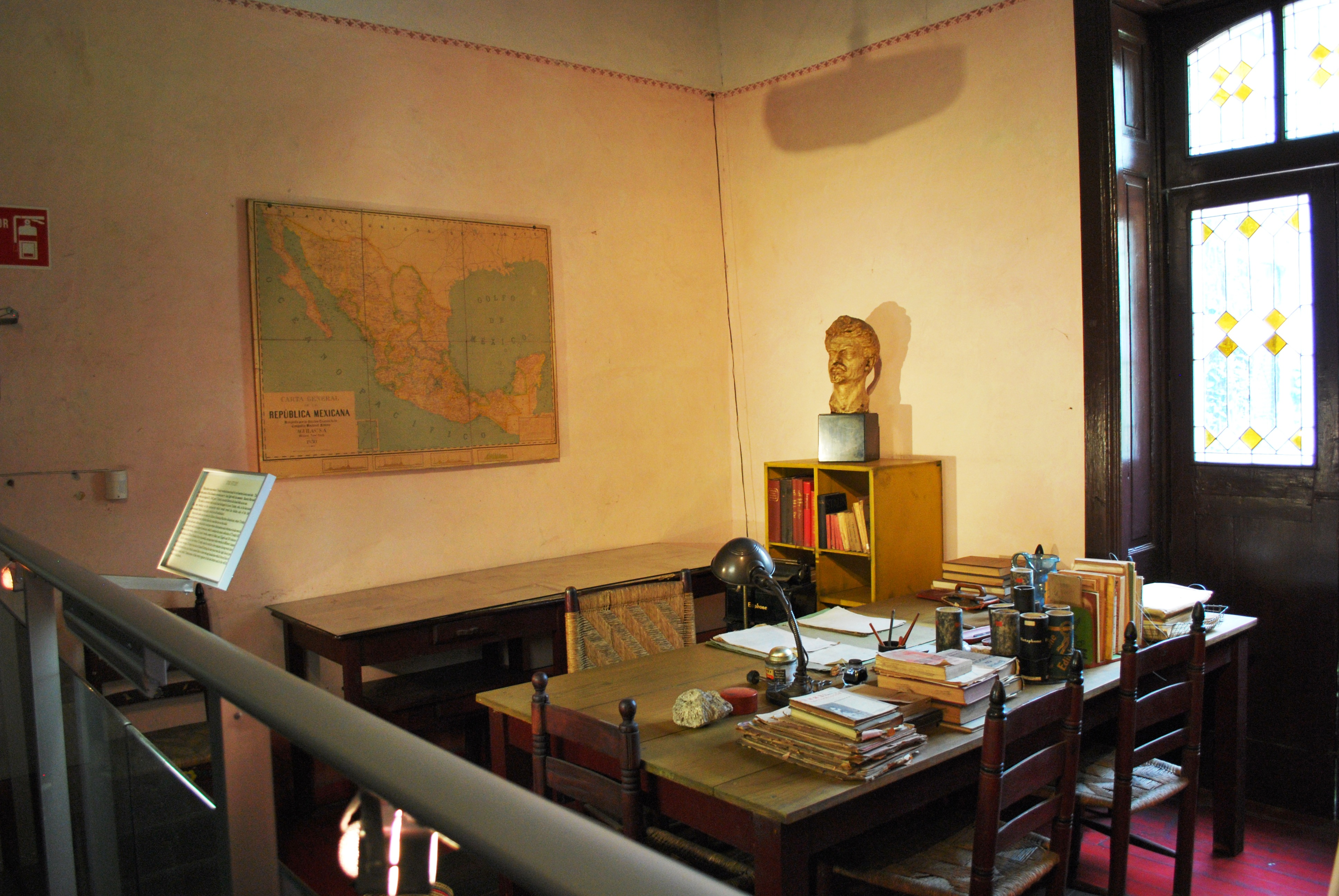
- The study where Trotsky was assassinated
- Location: Coyoacán, Mexico City, Mexico
- Date: 20 August 1940 c. 17:20 UTC−06:00
- Target: Leon Trotsky
- Weapon: Ice axe
- Deaths: 1 (Trotsky)
- Perpetrator: NKVD
- Assailant: Ramón Mercader

On 20 August 1940, Russian revolutionary, Soviet politician, and political theorist Leon Trotsky was fatally attacked by NKVD agent Ramón Mercader with an ice axe at his residence in Mexico City. Trotsky died from his injuries at a nearby hospital the next day.

== Background ==
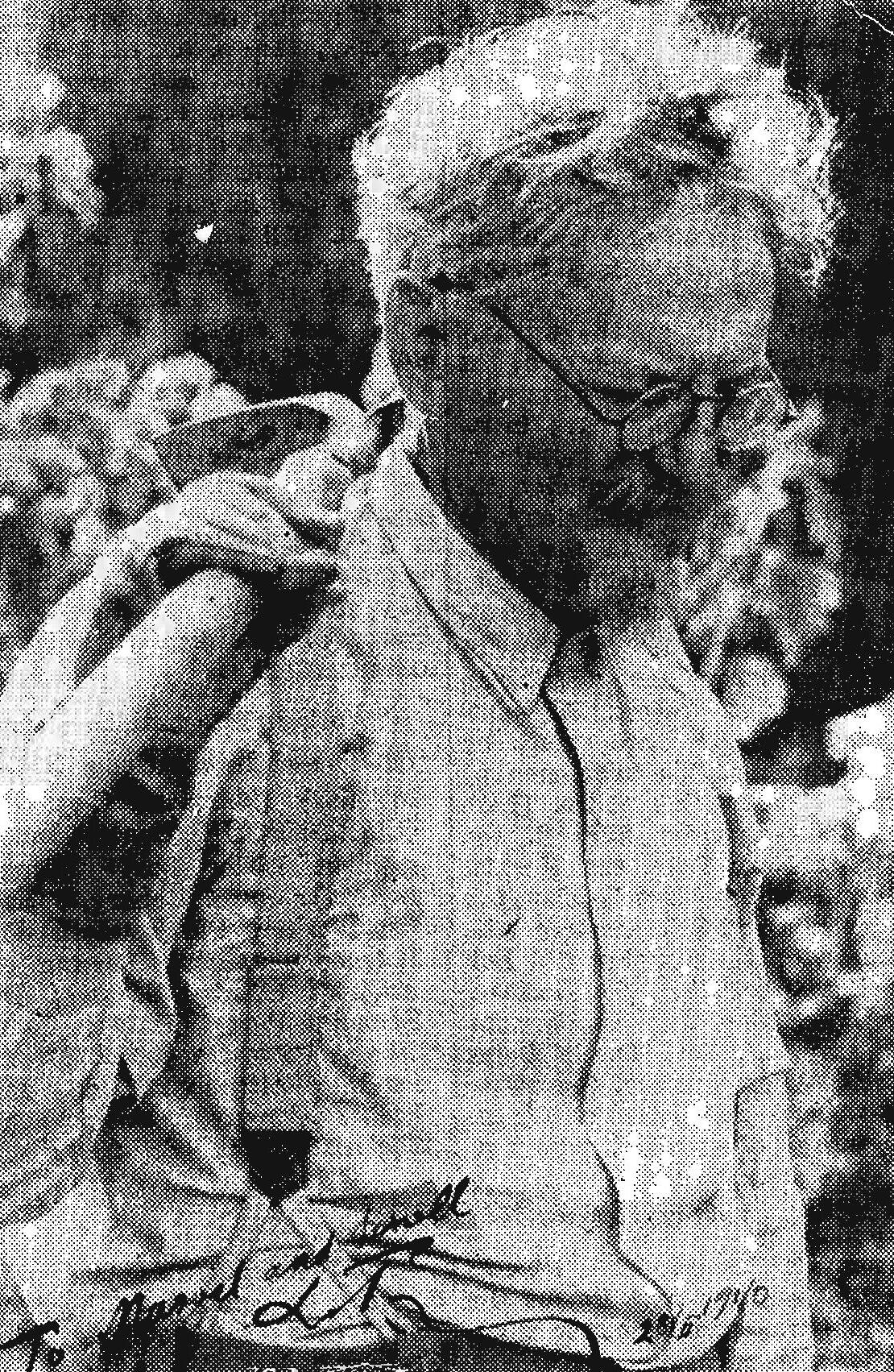
Trotsky in his garden in 1940, shortly before his assassination

After a failed attempt to have Trotsky murdered in March 1939, Stalin assigned the overall organization of implementing the task to the NKVD officer Pavel Sudoplatov, who, in turn, co-opted Nahum Eitingon. According to Sudoplatov's Special Tasks, the NKVD proceeded to set up a task force dedicated to organizing Trotsky's murder, which operated entirely autonomously from the NKVD's hitherto-established spy networks in the U.S. and Mexico. This involved a broader Stalinist infiltration campaign directed against Trotskyist networks in the United States and Europe, including efforts to monitor correspondence, couriers, and Trotsky’s associates; these accounts also identify Sylvia Franklin (also known as Sylvia Callen or Sylvia Caldwell), who worked in the Socialist Workers Party national office, as one channel through which information was passed to Soviet agents.

=== Previous assassination attempt ===
On 24 May 1940, Trotsky survived a raid on his villa by armed assassins led by the NKVD agent Iosif Grigulevich and Mexican painter David Alfaro Siqueiros. Trotsky's 14-year-old grandson, Vsevolod Platonovich "Esteban" Volkov (7 March 1926 – 16 June 2023), was shot in the foot. A young assistant and bodyguard of Trotsky, Robert Sheldon Harte, disappeared with the attackers and was later found murdered; it is probable that he was an accomplice who granted them access to the villa. Trotsky's other guards fended off the attackers. Following the failed assassination attempt, Trotsky wrote an article titled "Stalin Seeks My Death" on 8 June 1940, in which he stated that another assassination attempt was certain.

== Assassination ==
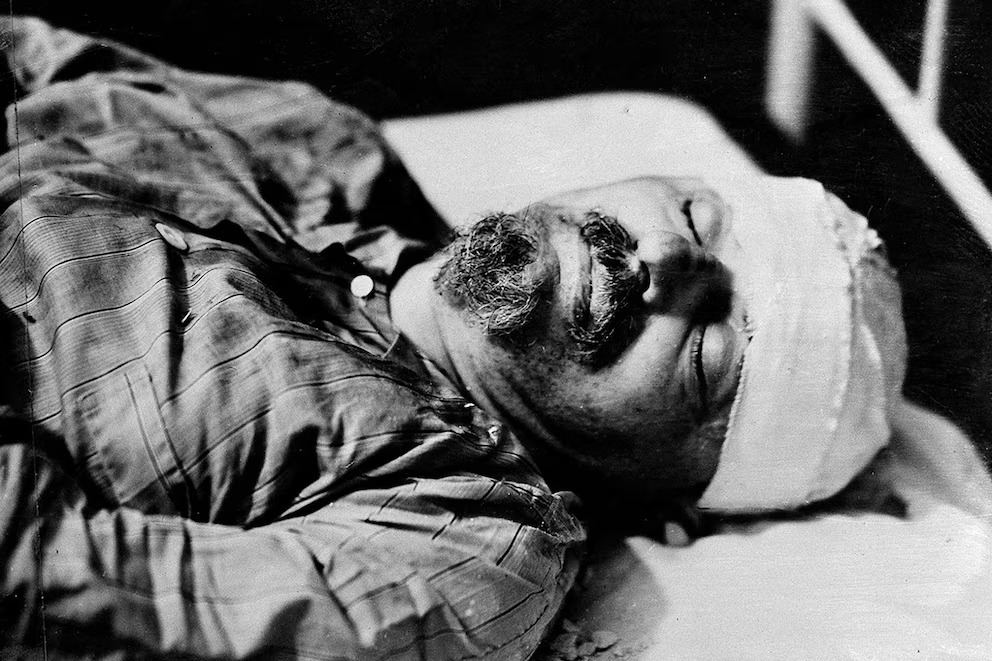
Trotsky's body after the assassination

At around 17:20 local time on 20 August 1940, Trotsky was attacked in his study by Spanish-born NKVD agent Ramón Mercader, who used a mountaineering ice axe as a weapon. (Note: The murder weapon was an ice axe (and not an ice pick—an awl-like bartender's tool); this misnomer has been explained as being occasioned by the assassin's use of the French-language term piolet—meaning the winter-mountaineering tool which resembles the pickaxes used in mining and other excavations, and by the multiple languages spoken by those involved in reporting the details; many history and reference books have confused the two tools.) According to Pavel Sudoplatov, the operation was known within the NKVD as "Operation Utka" (Operation Duck).

A mountaineering ice axe has a narrow end, called the pick, and a flat wide end called the adze. The adze of the axe wounded Trotsky, fracturing his parietal bone and penetrating 7 cm (2.8 in) into his brain. The blow to his head was bungled and failed to kill Trotsky instantly. Witnesses stated that Trotsky spat on Mercader and began struggling fiercely with him, which resulted in Mercader's hand being broken. Hearing the commotion, Trotsky's bodyguards burst into the room and nearly beat Mercader to death, but Trotsky stopped them, laboriously stating that the assassin should be made to answer questions. Trotsky was then taken to a hospital and operated on, surviving for more than a day, yet ultimately dying at the age of 60 on 21 August 1940 from blood loss and shock. Mercader later testified at his trial:

I laid my raincoat on the table in such a way as to be able to remove the ice axe which was in the pocket. I decided not to miss the wonderful opportunity that presented itself. The moment Trotsky began reading the article, he gave me my chance; I took out the ice axe from the raincoat, gripped it in my hand and, with my eyes closed, dealt him a terrible blow on the head.

According to James P. Cannon, then the national secretary of the American Socialist Workers Party, Trotsky's last words were "I will not survive this attack. Stalin has finally accomplished the task he attempted unsuccessfully before."

== Aftermath ==
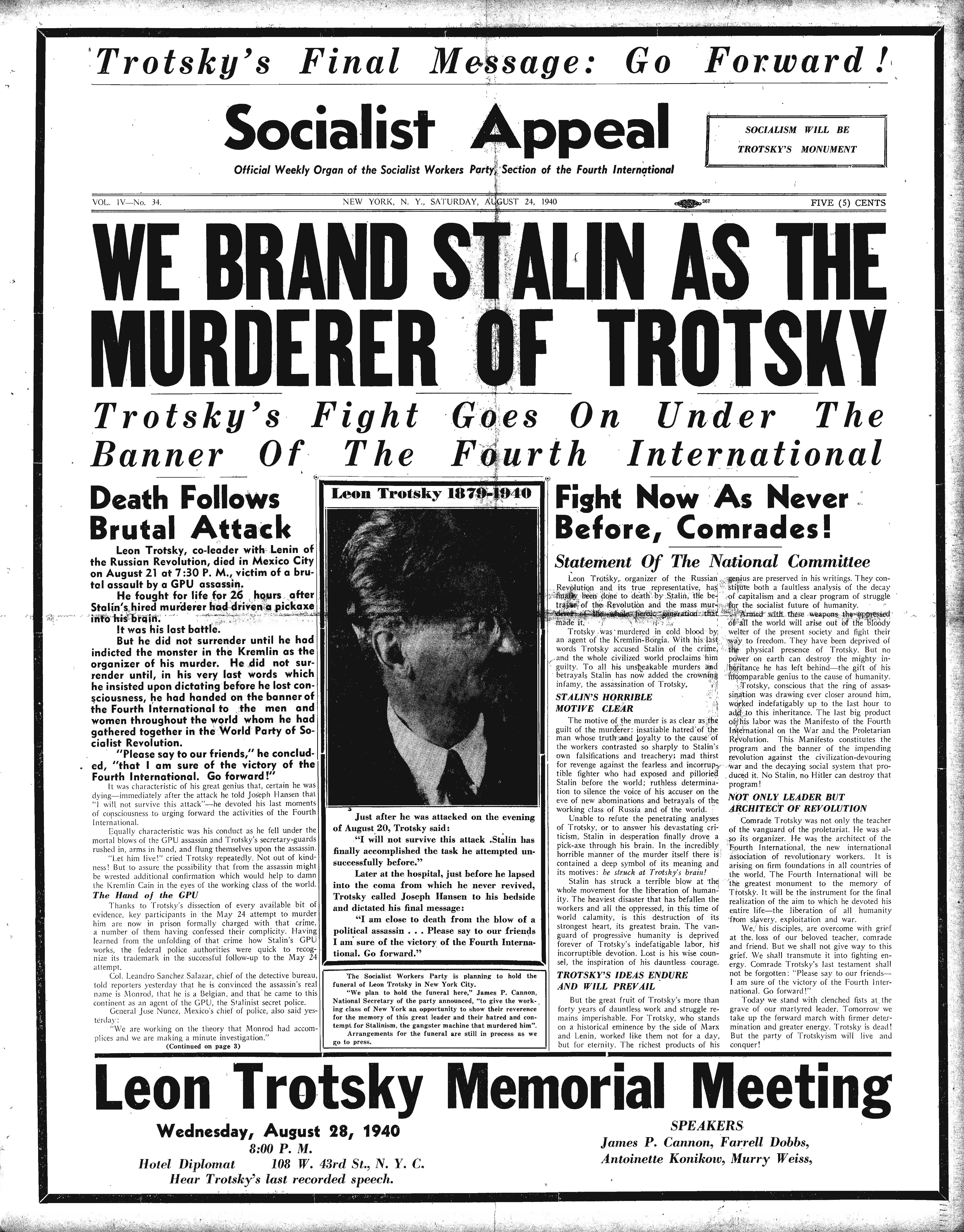
Socialist Appeal newsletter published by the Socialist Workers Party announcing Trotsky's assassination

In the aftermath of Trotsky's assassination, an estimated 300,000 people had passed by his funeral casket in Mexico City over several days by 27 August 1940.

Mercader was tried for and convicted of murder for the assassination, spending the next 20 years in Lecumberri Prison in Mexico City. Joseph Stalin publicly dismissed Mercader as a dangerous Trotskyist and denied any responsibility for the assassination, though his mother was presented with the Order of Lenin for her own part in the operation. After Mercader's release from prison in 1960 and resettlement in the Soviet Union in 1961, he was awarded the Order of Lenin and Hero of the Soviet Union "for the special deed," both of which were presented to him by KGB chairman Alexander Shelepin.

In May 1975, the Trotskyist organization the International Committee of the Fourth International launched Security and the Fourth International, an investigation into Leon Trotsky’s assassination and the infiltration of the Trotskyist movement by Soviet intelligence agents. The investigation examined the role of GPU/NKVD operatives within Trotskyist circles, including Mark Zborowski, who had penetrated the Paris-based organization led by Trotsky’s son Lev Sedov and whose activity as a Soviet agent was later documented in U.S. Senate testimony and Venona decrypts.

== See also ==
- Leon Trotsky: A Revolutionary's Life by Joshua Rubenstein (2011)
- The Prophet: The Life of Leon Trotsky by Isaac Deutscher (1954–1963)
- Transnational repression

== Bibliography ==
- Don Levine, Isaac (1960). The Mind of an Assassin. New York: New American Library. ISBN 0-313-20972-3.
- Soto-Pérez-de-Celis, Enrique (1 August 2010). "The Death of Leon Trotsky". Neurosurgery. 67 (2): 417–423. doi:10.1227/01.NEU.0000371968.27560.6C. PMID 20644428.
- Sudoplatov, Pavel A.; Sudoplatov, Anatoly P.; Schecter, Jerrold L.; Schecter, Leona P. (1994). Special Tasks: The Memoirs of an Unwanted Witness – A Soviet Spymaster. Little, Brown and Company. ISBN 0-316-77352-2.
- Volkogonov, Dmitri (1996). Trotsky, the Eternal Revolutionary. HarperCollins. ISBN 978-0-00-729166-3.
