= Martha Frayde =

Cuban doctor, revolutionary and dissident

Martha Frayde (born 15 August 1920 in Havana, deceased 4 December 2013 in Madrid) was a Cuban doctor, dissident, and revolutionary.

== Biography ==
Frayde earned a degree in medicine from the University of Havana in 1946, specialising in gynecology, before completing a post-doc at McGill University in Canada.

On returning to Cuba from Canada in the early 1950s, she joined the left-wing Partido Ortodoxo. After striking up a friendship with Fidel Castro, she joined the 26th of July Movement in 1953, becoming a revolutionary guerilla. In 1957, she was briefly arrested, but was able to escape.

After the success of the Cuban Revolution in 1958, she was named head of the National Hospital in Havana and joined the new Cuban government on several diplomatic missions. She then became Cuban ambassador to UNESCO until 1965, at which point she resigned in protest over the Cuban government's increasingly pro-Soviet position.

She then spent the next few years practising medicine privately out of her home, suffering harassment from the Castro regime and being prevented from leaving the country. In 1976, she co-founded the Cuban Human Rights Committee along with Elizardo Sánchez. She was subsequently arrested and sentenced to 29 years in prison for espionage. After international outrage over her imprisonment and the conditions of her detention, she was released and exiled to Spain.

In 1983, she was interviewed for the Improper Conduct documentary. In 1987, she published a book titled Listen, Fidel.

She died in 2013 in Madrid, at the age of 93.
