= Nahum Eitingon =

Soviet intelligence officer (1899–1981)

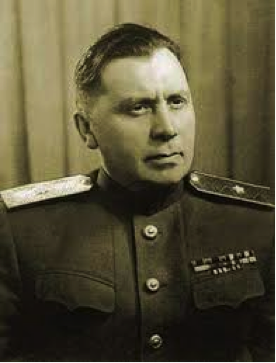
- Eitingon in 1957
- Born: 6 December 1899; Shklov, Mogilev Governorate, Russian Empire
- Died: 3 May 1981 (aged 81); Moscow, Russian SFSR, Soviet Union
- Other names: General Leonid Aleksandrovich Kotov, Grozovsky, Leonov, Naumov, Comrade Pablo
- Children: 4

Nahum Isaakovich Eitingon (Russian: Наум Исаакович Эйтингон, romanized: Naum Isaakovich Eytingon), also known as Leonid Aleksandrovich Eitingon (Russian: Леонид Александрович Эйтингон; 6 December 1899 – 3 May 1981), was a Soviet intelligence officer. Eitingon rose through the ranks of the early Soviet Union's intelligence services through his involvement in a number of special operations, most famously the assassination of Leon Trotsky. Later in his career, he organized anti-Nazi Partisan networks and used his extensive network in the United States to engage in atomic espionage.

Eitingon fell victim to the secret police apparatus he helped build after being accused of "Zionist plotting" in 1951, effectively ending his intelligence career. He lived out the rest of his life in relative obscurity.

== Early life ==
Eitingon was born into a Lithuanian Jewish family in Shklov, Russian Empire (now Belarus). His father, Isaak Faivelovich Eitingon, was a paper mill clerk, and his grandfather was a lawyer. He may have been a distant cousin of Max Eitingon. Shortly before the Russian Revolution his family moved to Mogilev, where Nahum studied at Mogilev Commercial School. Eitingon first became involved in labor during the German occupation of Mogilev, when he joined a cement worker's union and joined the Left Socialist-Revolutionaries. In his memoirs, KGB General and friend and colleague of Eitingon Pavel Sudoplatov claimed that Eitingon had fought in the Red Army since 1918, however, this claim is not substantiated by official records of the time. Following the Russian Revolution, he became a clerk at the commodities exchange. Following several promotions within the local labor bureaucracy, he joined the CPSU in 1919.

== Intelligence career ==
Eitingon joined the Cheka on May 10, 1920, having been recruited to a shortage of Chekists in the area. Along with other Chekists, he took part in numerous operations during the Russian Civil War, including the "liquidation" of a number of the more prosperous citizens of the Belarusian town of Gomel. He also gained prominence at the time for his work against banditry in Belarus. Eitingon was temporarily ejected from the Cheka and investigated during a 1921 purge due to his bourgeois origins, however, he was quickly let back in. In 1924, he graduated from Frunze Military Academy, after which served at several diplomatic postings in China and Turkey under the auspices of the OGPU. From 1927 to 1929 he served as Vice-Consul General at the Consulate of the USSR at Harbin. He also served at the special operations directorate of the OGPU from 1930 to 1932 and served under Alexander Orlov during the Spanish Civil War, using his linguistic skills to adopt several aliases. During this time, he was involved in several operations, including the assassination of Zhang Zoulin and the transportation of the Spanish gold reserves to the USSR. At the end of the 1920s, Eitingon, a polyglot, organized and led an operation producing fake documents which persuaded the Japanese that 20 Russian agents who were working for them had secretly applied to have their Soviet citizenship restored. This ruse resulted in the Japanese executing their anti-Soviet allies. In 1930, Eitingon was appointed deputy director of the Administration for Special Tasks under Yakov Serebryansky, but due to his poor personal relations with Serebryansky, in April 1933 he was shifted to chief of section charged with coordinating the operation of "illegals" in the INO (Foreign Department of the OGPU) under Artur Artuzov and later (from May 1935) Abram Slutsky. According to Pavel Sudoplatov, Eitingon was sent to the U.S. as an "illegal" in the beginning of the 1930s, prior to the establishment of Soviet Union–United States relations in November 1933, to recruit Japanese and Chinese emigrants with a view to possible using them in military and sabotage operations against Japan (the U.S. itself was not deemed a high priority for intelligence operations by the Centre then). One of the agents recruited by Eitingon in the U.S. was Japanese painter Yotoku Miyagi, who in 1933 returned to Japan and became a member of Richard Sorge's spy ring in that country. Eitingon was also tasked to assess the intelligence potential of Americans involved in Communist activities.

He was active in Spain in the late 1930s, during the Spanish Civil War. Eitingon was reputedly responsible for a number of kidnappings and assassinations at the behest of the OGPU/NKVD in Western countries. However, Pavel Sudoplatov writes that Western accounts of Eitingon's role in the abduction of White Russian Gen Yevgeny Miller in Paris in September 1937, organised by NKVD, are false. Sudoplatov also notes the unabashed sexual promiscuity of Eitingon, who in this period of his career had concurrent relationships with several women (including his wives) and used his female colleagues and subordinates as mistresses. For example, Eitingon took with him to Spain, Aleksandra Kochergina as his mistress who played the role of his third "wife" while he ran NKVD guerrilla operations during the Spanish Civil War. He remained married to his second wife. While in Spain, he managed to meet and seduce the aristocrat, Caridad Mercader del Rio, the mother of Ramon, Trotsky's assassin. Then in 1942, Eitingon impregnated Muza Malinovskaya, a champion Soviet parachutist while on a mission in Turkey (for eight months). It is not clear how he was able to afford this lifestyle (dating, courting, cafes, cabarets, wine, renting an apartment or house rather than living in the NKVD barracks). However, Sudoplatov praised Eitingon for spending all of his money on his wives and children.

The illegal espionage network, which included Jews with ancestry in the Russian Empire, established by Eitingon in the United States in the early 1930s helped Pavel Sudoplatov in the 1940s run a wide network of Soviet moles in the scientific community in the U.S. and beyond, to conduct scientific espionage.

=== Assassination of Trotsky ===
Leon Trotsky, the Soviet revolutionary, had been banished from the USSR by Joseph Stalin and had found refuge in Mexico. Stalin assigned the organisation and execution of a plan to assassinate Trotsky to Eitingon. While in Spain during the Spanish Civil War, Eitingon was able to recruit a young Spaniard communist ideologue, Ramón Mercader, as executioner. Trotsky was living in Mexico at the time and, soon after Mercader worked his way into Trotsky's group of friends, Eitingon had also arrived in Mexico.

On 20 August 1940, Mercader attacked and fatally wounded Trotsky with an ice axe while the exiled Russian was in the study of his house in Coyoacán (then a village on the southern fringes of Mexico City). Eitingon and another collaborator (Caridad Mercader, Ramón Mercader's mother) in the assassination plot were waiting outside Trotsky's residence, in separate cars, to provide a getaway for Mercader. When Mercader failed to return, having been detained by Trotsky's bodyguards, they both left and fled the country.

=== Second World War ===
Eitingon continued his service in the NKVD during World War II. In 1941, he and Sudoplatov successfully negotiated the release of purged NKVD officers with Lavrentiy Beria, as they were needed at the outset of the war. After this, he was involved in the assurance of Turkish neutrality from 1941 to 1942. In late 1942, he was appointed as deputy head of the 4th Directorate of the NKVD, which was focused on sabotage and infiltration operations behind enemy lines. In this capacity as the deputy of Sudoplatov, he organized several successful operations, including Operation Scherhorn. He also assisted in the organization of several partisan movements in Eastern Europe. Through this work, Eitingon was introduced to Rudolf Abel, who would become famous as a spy in the US. Eitingon also used his extensive preexisting network in the US to conduct atomic espionage.

Eitingon was further said to have been instrumental in the NKVD "Max" network, the Jewish-led Abwehr spy ring whose allegiances continue to befuddle historians to the present day.

=== After the war ===
After the victory of the USSR in World War II, Eitingon was made deputy head of the C Department of the NKVD (later KGB), where he continued atomic espionage. In this role, Eitingon was also tasked with operations against the anti-communist Forest Brothers in the Baltic states and other anti-Soviet movements in Eastern Europe. He was also tasked with the liquidation of the OUN and other Ukrainian nationalist movements. During this time, he played roles in the arrests and executions of suspected nationalist collaborators or sympathizers, including Bishop Theodore Romzha and Alexander Shumsky.

== Doctors' Plot and later life ==
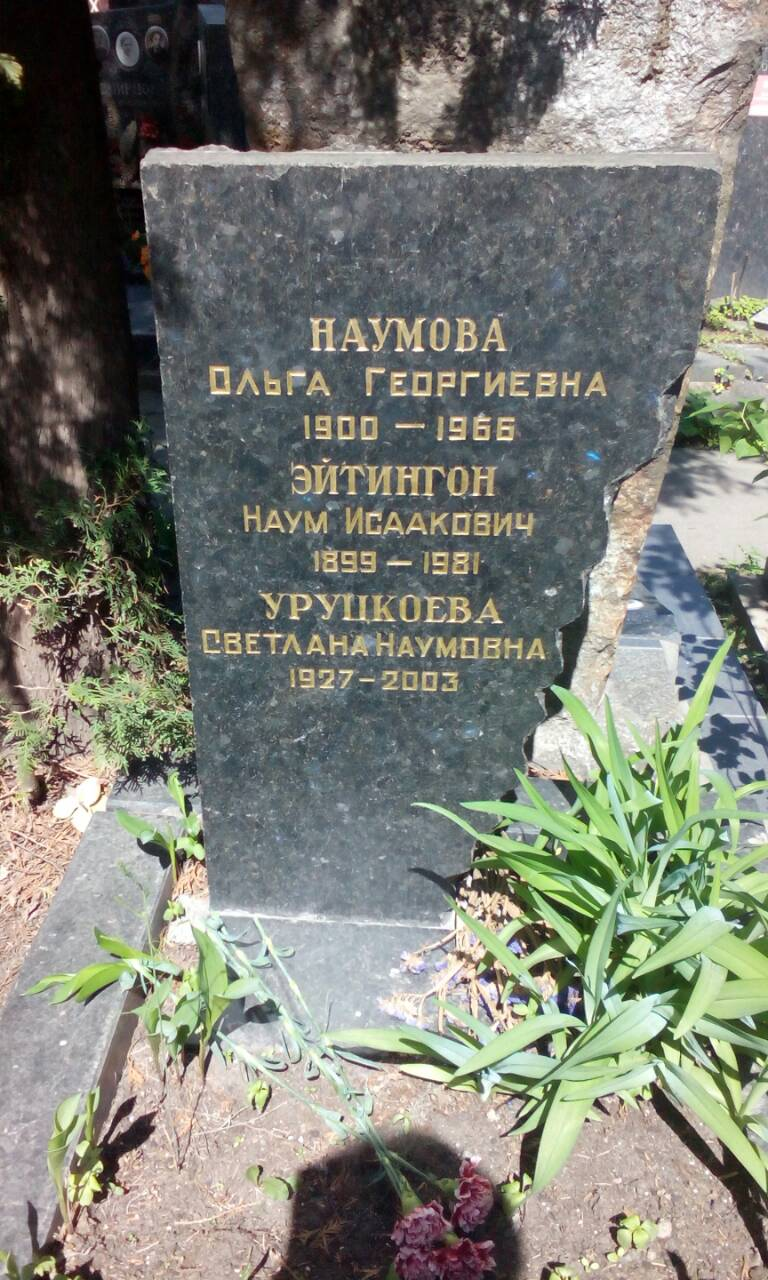
Eitingon's grave in Moscow

In October 1951, Major-General of State Security Eitingon, along with three other high-ranking members of the government (all Russian Jewish), were accused of "a Zionist plot to seize power" (the Doctors' Plot). Eitingon's sister Sofia was also arrested. As a doctor, she was considered to be the "link" to the plotting doctors who were allegedly planning to poison high-ranking Soviet leaders. The officers were all imprisoned in cold, dark cells and tortured. The tortures led many of them to falsely confess but Eitingon was steadfast in his denial. Sofia was sentenced to 10 years in prison.

After Stalin's death in March 1953, the head of Soviet intelligence and security services Lavrentiy Beria issued an order to close the cases against the "Zionist plotters" and all were released, including Sofia.

Beria was arrested in June 1953 and executed. Eitingon, considered a supporter of Beria, was arrested again and held in jail without trial at the Butyrka prison in Moscow for four years. In November 1957 he was put on trial, in which he was accused (again) of conspiracy against the regime (but this time without any Zionist connotations). The court sentenced him to 12 years in prison, and his rank and all his medals were taken from him. After Nikita Khrushchev's ouster from power in 1964, Eitingon was released from prison. After his release, he worked as an interpreter and editor at the International Book Organization in Moscow.

Nahum Eitingon died in 1981 of natural causes. He is buried in the Donskoye Cemetery. In 1992 the Russian Supreme Court annulled the conviction and cleared his name. Eitingon had persistently sought his official rehabilitation, but this was granted only posthumously.

== See also ==
- Pavel Sudoplatov
