= Animal Farm (opera) =

Opera by Alexander Raskatov (2023)

Animal Farm is an English-language opera by Russian composer Alexander Raskatov based on George Orwell's 1944 novella of the same name. The opera contains two acts, nine scenes, and an epilogue, with a libretto written by Ian Burton and musical direction by Bassem Akiki. The project was conceived by Italian director Damiano Michieletto who collaborated with Raskatov on the project which was a co-commission by the Vienna State Opera, Teatro Massimo, and the Dutch National Opera.

The opera's premiere took place on 3 March 2023 as part of Dutch National Opera's 2022/2023 season and has been welcomed with great success by the audience.

== Cast ==
Roles and singers
Roles	Voice Type	Amsterdam Premiere	Vienna Premiere
Old Major	bass	Gennady Bezzubenkov	Gennady Bezzubenkov
Napoleon	baritone	Misha Kiria	Wolfgang Bankl
Snowball	tenor	Michael Gniffke	Michael Gniffke
Squealer	tenor	James Kryshak	Andrei Popov
Boxer	baritone	Germán Olvera	Stefan Astakhov
Benjamin	tenor	Karl Laquit	Karl Laquit
Minimus	countertenor	Artyem Krutko	Artyem Krutko
Clover	contralto	Helena Rasker	Margaret Plummer
Muriel	mezzo	Maya Gour	Isabel Signoret
Blacky	soprano	Elena Vassilieva	Elena Vassilieva
Mollie	high soprano	Holly Flack	Holly Flack
Pigetta (young actress)	countertenor	Karl Laquit	Karl Laquit
Mr. Jones	tenor	Marcel Beekman	Daniel Jenz
Mrs. Jones	soprano	Francis van Broekhuizen	Aurora Marthens
