= Jones (Animal Farm) =

Character in George Orwell's novel Animal Farm

Mr. Jones
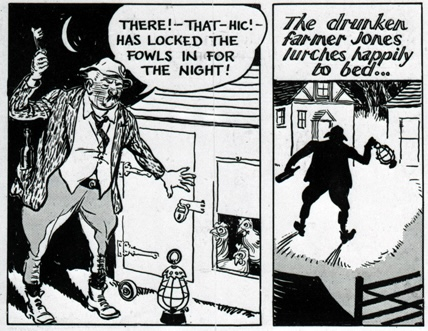
- Artwork of Mr. Jones from the first instalment of the Animal Farm comic strip, adapted by Don Freeman with artwork by Norman Pett
- First appearance: Animal Farm
- Created by: George Orwell
- Based on: Tsar Nicholas II
- Portrayed by: Tony Robinson (Down on Animal Farm); Pete Postlethwaite (1999 film)
- Voiced by: Frank Atkinson (1947 radio drama); Maurice Denham (1954 film); Andy Serkis (2025 film)

In-universe information
- Alias: Master
- Occupation: Farmer & Owner of Manor Farm (Animal Farm)
- Weapon: Gun; Whip
- Religion: Possibly Christian (Note: It is said that Napoleon's 'favourite sow appeared in the watered silk dress which Mrs. Jones had been used to wear on Sundays.')

Mr. Jones of Manor Farm is a fictional character in George Orwell's 1945 allegorical novella Animal Farm. The alcoholic master of Manor Farm, Jones mistreats his animals, prompting them to rebel and take control of the farm. With his farmhands and members of the adjoining farms, Jones attempts to take it back but the men are beaten back by the pig Snowball's military prowess. Jones moves to another part of the country and, years later, dies in an inebriates' home.

Animal Farm is an allegory for the Russian Revolution and Jones represents the ruling class, often interpreted as specifically an allegory for Tsar Nicholas II of Russia. Jones is overthrown by the animals of his farm, who represent Bolshevik and liberal revolutionaries.

== Fictional biography ==
Mr. Jones was once a capable farmer and the master of Manor Farm. He was married with children. Jones wears a bowler hat, black coat, ratcatcher breeches, and leather leggings. He often reads Newspapers and owns many books, including One Thousand Useful Things to Do About the House, Every Man His Own Bricklayer and Electricity for Beginners. By the time of the novella, he has fallen into a depressive episode after losing money in a lawsuit. He spends his days lounging while reading the newspaper and drinking alcohol. Manor Farm falls into disrepair due to his neglect and his idle, dishonest men.

At the beginning of the novella, he locks the hen-houses but fails to lock the popholes due to being intoxicated. During the night, Jones' prize Middle White Old Major calls in the animals of Manor Farm for a meeting. He tells them that animals will never truly be free while under human rule and assures them that, though they may not live to see it, the animals of England will one day rise up and defeat their human masters. After teaching the animals a revolutionary tune, the animals sing it repeatedly. This awakes Jones who, believing there to be a fox in the yard, fires a shotgun pellet into the darkness, ending the meeting.

Old Major dies three nights later and the pigs Napoleon, Snowball and Squealer form his teachings into the system of Animalism, teaching it to the animals several nights a week while Jones sleeps.

On a Saturday Midsummer's Eve, Jones leaves the farm for Willingdon and becomes so intoxicated at the Red Lion that he does not return until noon on Sunday. In his absence, his men milked the cows in the morning and went out rabbiting without feeding the animals. When Jones returns, he heads straight for the drawing-room sofa and falls asleep with the News of the World over his face, neglecting to feed the animals. In the evening the animals have still not been fed and they grow furious. A cow breaks the door of the store-shed and the animals feed from its bins. Jones wakes and gathers 3 of his men. They equip themselves with whips and lash at the animals. This is more than the starved animals can bear and, without planning it, the animals begin attacking the men, butting and kicking them. After a few minutes of trying to defend themselves and, pursued by the animals, flee down the carttrack that leads to the main road. Jones' wife observes the incident and gathers her possessions, following them. The animals chase the humans to the road and shut the five-barred gate. With Jones expelled, the animals take control of Manor Farm, renaming it Animal Farm. They destroy reminders of Jones and aim to run the farm without the cruel aspects which characterised Jones' rule.

Until the late summer, Jones spends most of his time complaining to other farmers in the taproom of the Red Lion of the injustice he had suffered. Other farmers sympathise, though they offer little help and wonder whether they can take advantage of Jones' misfortune. Mr. Pilkington and Mr. Frederick, owners of the two farms which adjoin Animal Farm, Foxwood and Pinchfield respectively, are terrified that a similar uprising could occur on their farms. They initially pretend to be amused by an animal-run farm but soon change their strategy, spreading rumours about atrocities committed by the animals and blaming this on them rebelling against the laws of nature.

Early in October, Jones, along with his men and 6 from Foxwood and Pinchfield, sent by Pilkington and Frederick, enter the farm in hopes of retaking it from the animals, who have continued farming and trading in Jones' absence. Jones brings his gun while the other men carry sticks. Snowball, who has begun leading the farm with the other pigs, particularly Napoleon, has studied a book on Julius Caesar's campaigns and devises a plan to defeat the humans. As the humans approach the farm buildings, the Geese attack them. They are easily driven off by the men's sticks but this is merely a skirmishing manoeuvre by Snowball. Snowball leads the sheep along with Muriel, a goat and Benjamin, the donkey, in a charge. Benjamin lashes at the men with his hooves while the others prod and butt them. Snowball squeals and the animals retreat. The men, unaware that this is part of Snowball's plan, give a shout of triumph and rush after them. As the men enter the yard, the three horses, the three cows, and the rest of the pigs cut them off. Snowball signals and leads a forward charge and Jones fires his gun, wounding Snowball and killing a sheep. Snowball bodyslams Jones' legs, throwing him into a dung-heap and Boxer, the cart-horse, rears and strikes a stable-lad in the skull, accidentally killing him. Seeing this, several of the men drop their sticks and attempt to flee but the animals chase them and enact vengeance on them, wounding them in many ways. Jones' cat bites a cowman in the neck. When an opening presents itself, the men retreat to the main road, pecked at by pursuing geese.

Jones eventually gives up hope of reclaiming his farm and moves to another part of the county. Years later, he dies in an inebriates' home.

== Interpretations ==
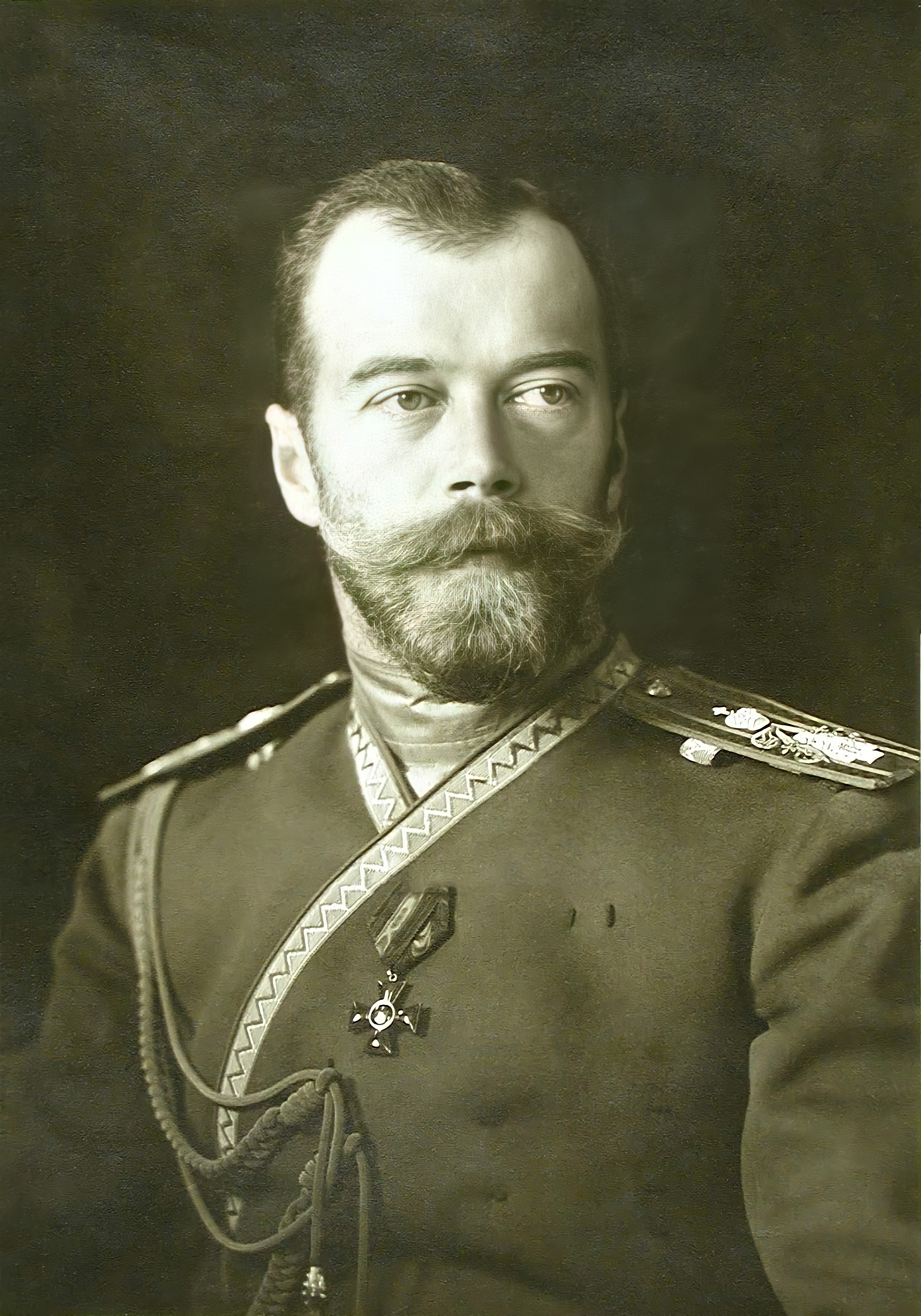
Jones is often considered to be an allegory for Tsar Nicholas II

As the leader of the farm prior to the revolution, Jones is widely identified as representing as the ruling class prior to the revolution, sometimes the bourgeoisie but most often Tsar Nicholas II.

Nicholas II severely underestimated the scale of discontent among the Russian people in 1917, paralleled by Orwell through his characterisation of Jones as often drunk and negligent toward the displeased animals. A major factor in the abdication of Nicholas was food shortages. During World War I, food shortages occurred in Russia, leading to riots. The end of Jones' rule of the farm has been compared to Nicholas II's, as the animals revolt after the Jones and his men neglect to feed them.

Scholar Patrick Reily argues that Animal Farm, as a comic tale about the horror of a failed revolution, uses comedy to soften the subject matter and allow the reader to digest the novella without repulsion. Jones' death is one topic which he claims is softened to make the book digestible. Nicholas II, his wife and his children were murdered by Bolsheviks, while Jones is allowed to flee the farm and eventually dies in an inebriates' home.

== Portrayals ==
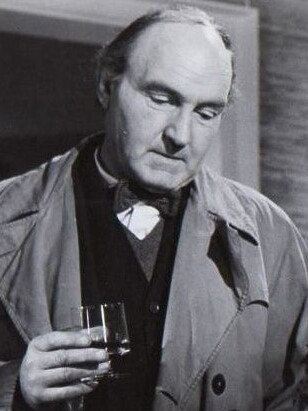
Maurice Denham voiced Jones in the 1954 film

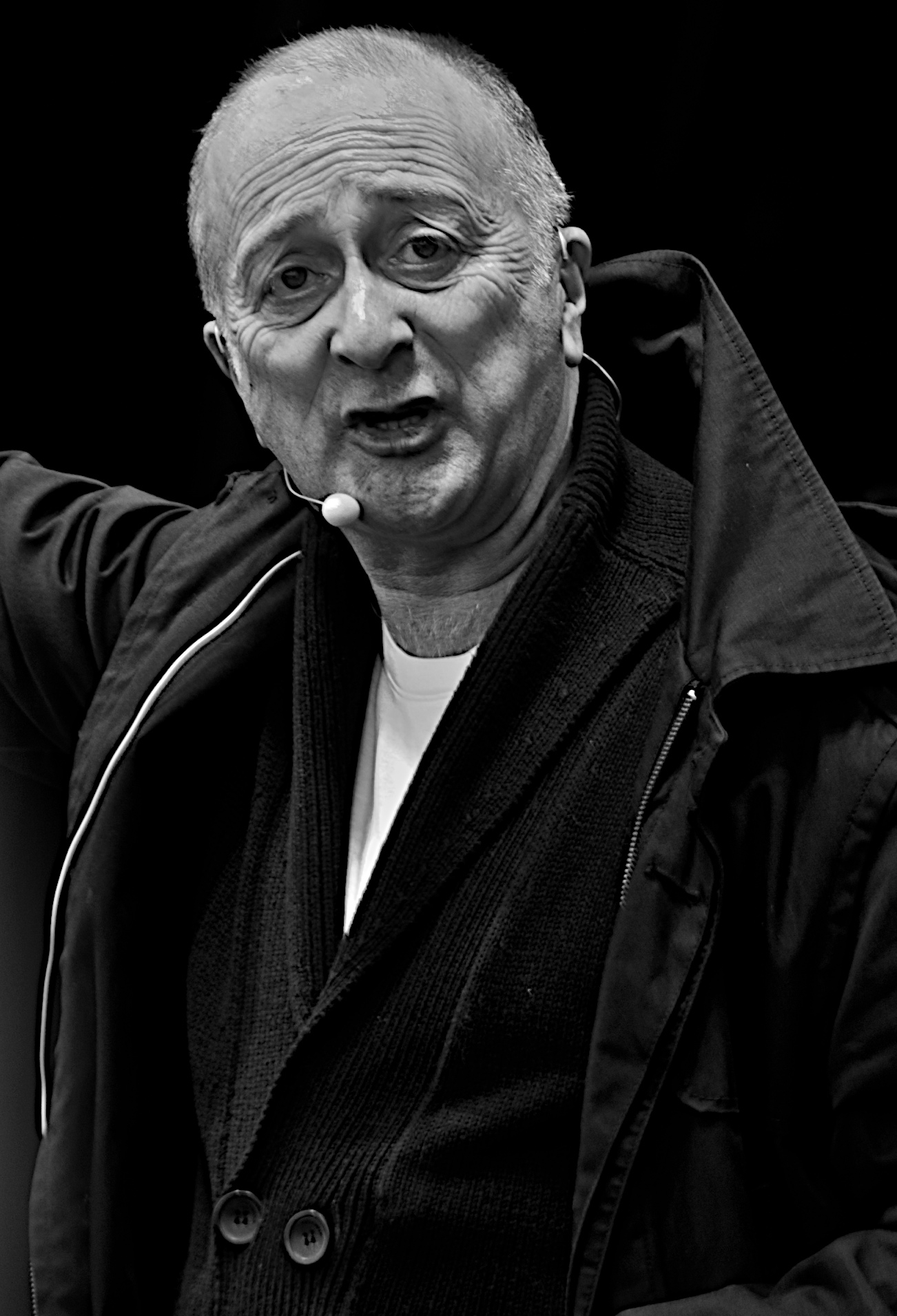
Tony Robinson portrayed Jones in the documentary featurette Down on Animal Farm

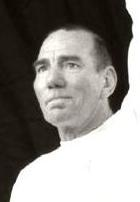
Pete Postlethwaite portrayed Jones in the 1999 film

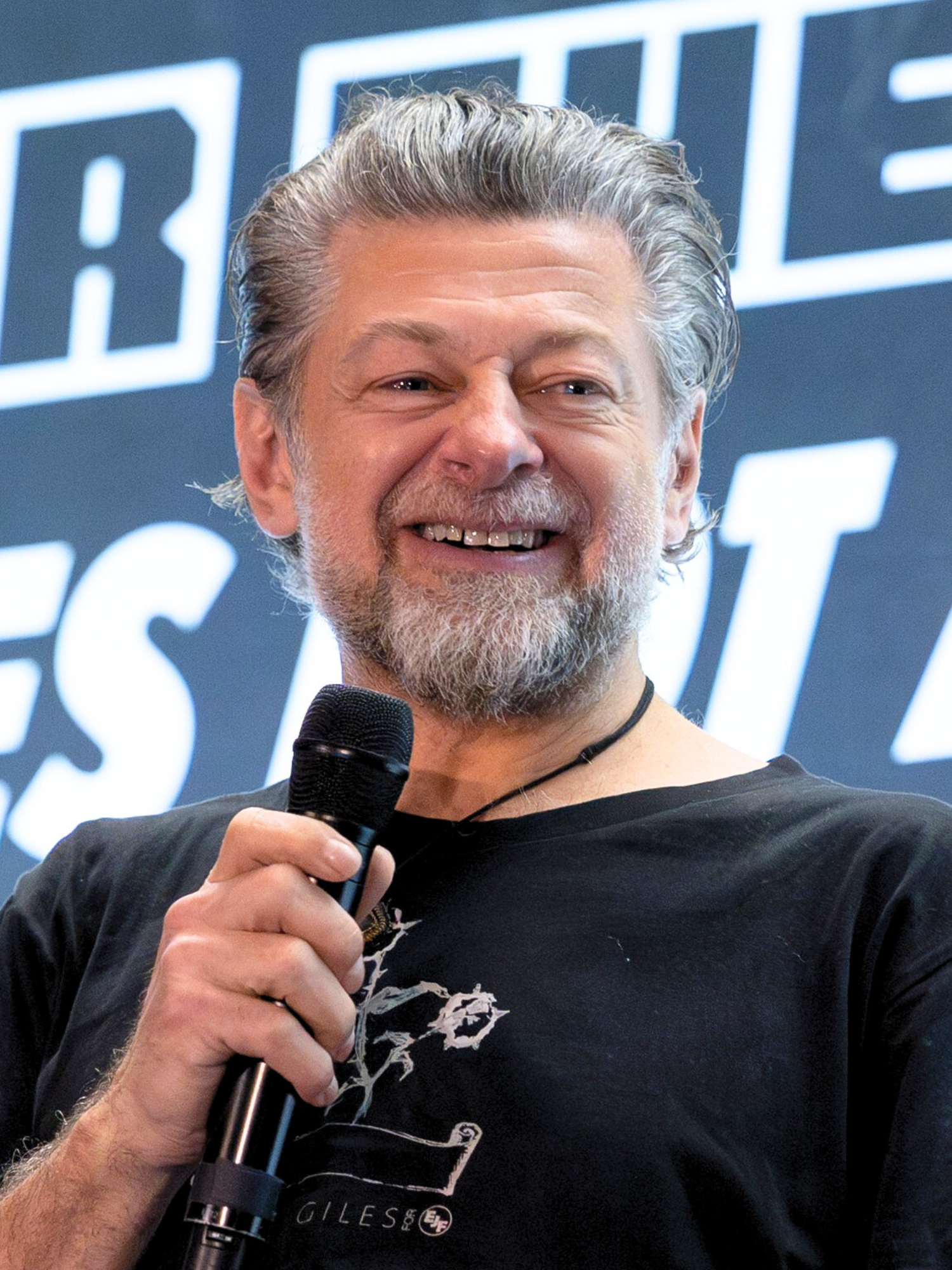
Andy Serkis voiced Jones in Animal Farm: A Cautionary Tail

Frank Atkinson voiced Jones with a "rural" accent in the 1947 BBC Radio Adaptation.

In the 1954 animated adaptation of the novel, Jones was voiced by Maurice Denham, who provided all voices bar the narration. Jones's place in the narrative is fairly faithful to the novel, except Jones is not married and never leaves the area and instead remains in his local pub. The opening scene depicts him at the pub with his men before returning to Manor Farm to lock the outhouses. Immediately after the revolution, Jones convinces the other pub-goers to help him retake the farm. When the other major farmers decide to make another attempt to seize Animal Farm, Jones offers to join them but is turned down. Instead, he acquires a large quantity of dynamite and destroys the windmill with himself still inside (due to being drunk). In the final scene, the animals see Napoleon and the other pigs face's morph into Jones'.

Tony Robinson portrayed Jones in the 1994 featurette Down on Animal Farm, a documentary about the making of the 1954 adaptation.

Pete Postlethwaite portrayed Jones in the 1999 live-action film, as a brutish yokel who is highly in debt and is the laughingstock of the neighboring farms for his poor farm, although his alcoholism is toned down. A brief scene depicts Jones and the wife of another farmer in bed together, until he is woken by the singing of the animals. He investigates but trips in the dirt and accidentally fires his shotgun, killing Old Major. In this film, he and Mrs. Jones destroy the windmill together before fleeing the area. What happened to them afterwards is never revealed.

In Orwell's Animal Farm, a video game developed by Nerial, the player can choose the animals' plan of attack during the revolution and other attempts by Jones to retake the farm with options such as 'attack' and 'defend'.

Director Andy Serkis voices Jones in the 2025 animated film Animal Farm: A Cautionary Tail. In a departure from the novel, Jones loses Manor Farm to foreclosure and the animals face the prospect of being sent to a slaughterhouse, prompting their revolution.
