= Animal Farm (disambiguation) =

Animal Farm is a 1945 novel by George Orwell.

Animal Farm may also refer to:

== Films based on the novel ==
- Animal Farm (1954 film), an animated film based on the book
- Animal Farm (1999 film), a live action film based on the book
- Animal Farm (2025 film), an animated film based on the book

== Other uses ==
- Animal Farm (video), pornographic film
- "Animal Farm" (song), by The Kinks
- "Animal Farm", a song by Madness from the 1982 album Driving in My Car
- "Animal Farm", a song by Greenslade from the 1975 album Time and Tide
- "Animal Farm", a song by Clutch from the 1995 album Clutch
- "Animal Farm", a song by Bibi from her upcoming debut studio album
- "Animal Farm", an episode of HBO drama Oz
- "Animal Farm", adapted by Peter Hall, National Theatre) 1984
- Animal Farm (opera) by the Russian composer Alexander Raskatov
- TV Animal Farm, a South Korean television program

== See also ==
- Farm
