= Boxer (Animal Farm) =

Cart horse from the novella Animal Farm

- First appearance: Animal Farm
- Last appearance: Animal Farm (Only Appearance)
- Created by: George Orwell
- Voiced by: Maurice Denham (1954 film); Paul Scofield (1999 film); Woody Harrelson (2025 film)

In-universe information
- Nickname: Boxer
- Species: Horse
- Gender: Male
- Occupation: Laborer at Animal Farm (before death)

Boxer is a character from George Orwell's 1945 novella Animal Farm, who is shown as the farm's dedicated and loyal labourer. The cart-horse Boxer serves as an allegory for the Russian working-class who helped to oust Tsar Nicholas II and establish the Soviet Union, but were eventually betrayed by the government under Joseph Stalin.

He is described as "faithful"; and he believes any problem can be solved if he works harder. David Low used a cart horse as a symbol for the T.U.C. in cartoons for many years before Orwell began to write Animal Farm.

Boxer can only remember four letters of the alphabet at a time but sees the importance of education, aspiring to learn the rest of the alphabet during his retirement. Boxer is a loyal supporter of Napoleon. Boxer listens to everything the self-appointed ruler of the farm says and assumes that everything Napoleon tells the farm animals is true, hence "Napoleon is always right".

Boxer's strength plays a huge part in keeping Animal Farm together prior to his death: the rest of the animals trusted in it to keep their spirits high during the long and hard laborious winters. Boxer was the only close friend of Benjamin, the cynical donkey.

Boxer fights in the Battle of the Cowshed and the Battle of the Windmill. He kicks a stable boy during a fight, mistakingly believing he has killed the boy. Though he dislikes humans, he hates himself for doing so, thinking that he went too far. When Boxer defends Snowball's reputation from Squealer's revisionism, the pigs designate him as a target for the Great Purge. However, when the dogs attack, Boxer pins one under his hooves, causing the other dogs to flee, and the captured dog is spared at Napoleon's request. When he collapses from overwork, the pigs say they have sent him to a veterinarian. In actuality, they have sent him to the knacker's yard to be slaughtered, in exchange for money to buy a case of whisky for the pigs to drink. Benjamin, who is described as "devoted to Boxer", noticed that the van Boxer is taken away in is the knacker's; however, Squealer deceives the other animals by saying that the van was owned by a veterinarian who failed to repaint the van. Squealer concocts a sentimental tale of the death of Boxer, saying that he was given the best medical care possible, paid for by Napoleon. Boxer's death is turned into a day of honoring him. Squealer says that his sayings, "Comrade Napoleon is always right" and "I will work harder!" should live on in all the animals, another excuse to make the animals work even harder.

During Old Major's speech, which inspired the principles of Animalism, a specific reference is made to how Boxer would be turned into glue under Farmer Jones' rule, thus implying that it would not happen to him under Animalism. "You, Boxer, the very day that those great muscles of yours lose their power, Jones will send you to the knacker, who will cut your throat and boil you down for the foxhounds."

== Films ==
In the 1954 film adaptation of Animal Farm, Boxer is voiced by Maurice Denham. In the 1999 film adaptation, he is voiced by Paul Scofield. In the 2025 film adaptation, he is voiced by Woody Harrelson.

== See also ==
- List of fictional horses
