= Anthems in Animal Farm =

George Orwell's 1945 allegorical novel Animal Farm contains various anthems adopted by the eponymous farm, most notably the original anthem "Beasts of England" and its later replacement "Comrade Napoleon".

The later song "Comrade Napoleon" praises Napoleon and fails to represent freedom at all. This change is used to show the corruption of the principles of the animals' rebellion by Animal Farm's leader Napoleon.

== "Beasts of England" ==
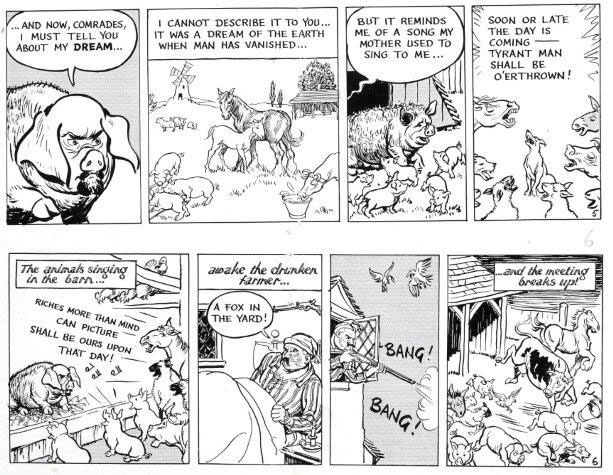
Artwork of the animals singing "Beasts of England" from the Animal Farm comic strip, adapted by Don Freeman with artwork by Norman Pett

"Beasts of England", the original anthem of the Animal Farm corresponds to the famous socialist anthem, The Internationale, but also alludes to Shelley's Men of England.

In the book, the pig Old Major explains his dream of an animal-controlled society three nights before his death. The song's tune is described in the novel as sounding like a combination of "La Cucaracha" and "Oh My Darling Clementine".

The animals sing "Beasts of England" frequently after the rebellion, especially after meetings. At one point when Clover the horse questions the direction of Animal Farm, she sings "Beasts of England" which causes the other animals to join in.

After "Beasts of England" has been used to express criticism of the direction of Animal Farm, Napoleon tries to supplant the song, arguing that such an anthem is antiquated and no longer needed after the rebellion has been completed. The anthem is first replaced by the short "Animal Farm!" and later by "Comrade Napoleon", while "Beasts of England" is eventually outlawed. The phasing out of "Beasts of England" as the anthem of Animal Farm corresponds to the Soviet Union's 1944 replacement of The Internationale with the National Anthem of the Soviet Union. However, while "Beasts of England" was banned in Animal Farm, "The Internationale" was not in the Soviet Union at any time and remained the anthem of the Communist Party.

Suzanne Gulbin compares the role of "Beasts of England" to that of the conch in William Golding's Lord of the Flies: it serves to create enthusiasm and unity, and its banning represents the loss of hope for a better life. Florence and William Boos read the fact that the animals continue to sing "Beasts of England" after it is banned as a testimony to the power of the memory of Old Major.

== "Animal Farm!" ==
"Animal Farm!" is the anthem first replacing "Beasts of England" after Squealer manages to convince the other animals that the original anthem is not required. Its purpose is to inspire loyalty to the farm, and also to the new leadership. Minimus the poet composes a short, new anthem which starts:

Animal Farm, Animal Farm,
Never through me shalt thou come to harm!

But it is noted that it does not inspire the animals as much as "Beasts of England."

Paul Kirschner writes that the switch from "Beasts of England" to "Animal Farm!" is a parody of the transition from Lenin's proletarian internationalism to Stalin's "Socialism in One Country". The song itself is most likely a reference to the State Anthem of the Soviet Union.

== "Comrade Napoleon" ==
As Napoleon became more powerful, he replaced "Beasts of England" with another anthem, again written by Minimus. The anthem praised and glorified Napoleon, attributing many of the successes on the farm to him, even though he had little or no role in them. The poem marked the general happy feeling towards the rule of Napoleon at the time in the book and was painted on the wall of the big barn opposite the Seven Commandments. It was capped by a portrait of Napoleon drawn by Squealer in white paint.

== 1999 film adaptation ==
Flag designs used in the 1999 adaptation during the film (left) and at the end of it (right)

In the 1999 film adaptation, "Beasts of England" is replaced with a song "Beasts of the World", which has its own tune and different lyrics. "Comrade Napoleon" is replaced by a song titled "Glorious Leader Napoleon", put to the tune of the Russian song "Let's Go". In the same film, a new song was written for Napoleon by a "grateful duck", called "Napoleon, Mighty Leader" (known as "The Song of the Grateful Duck" in the soundtrack).
