= Old Major =

Character in Orwell's novella "Animal Farm"

Major
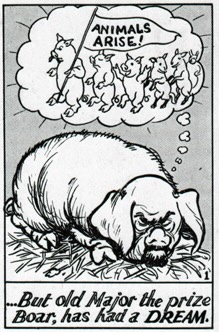
- Artwork by Norman Pett of Old Major from the Animal Farm comic strip. It has been observed that his features resemble Vladimir Lenin's.
- First appearance: Animal Farm
- Created by: George Orwell
- Based on: Karl Marx, Vladimir Lenin
- Voiced by: Maurice Denham (1954 film); Peter Ustinov (1999 film); Andy Serkis (2025 film)

In-universe information
- Nickname: Willingdon Beauty
- Species: Middle White
- Gender: Male
- Occupation: Revolutionary Leader of Animal Farm
- Relatives: issue of 400 piglets

Major, also called Willingdon Beauty during showings, is a fictional character of 1945 novella Animal Farm. A prize Middle White boar, the pig is a kind, grandfatherly philosopher of change.

Old Major is the first major character introduced in the novella, written by George Orwell. He serves as an allegory for both Karl Marx and Vladimir Lenin, whose ideas together influenced the Marxist-Leninist communist ideology that was later shaped by Joseph Stalin. Stalin, in turn, is represented in the novella by Napoleon, the story's main antagonist.

== Analysis ==
Major proposes a solution to the animals' desperate plight on Manor Farm under the Jones administration and inspires thoughts of a rebellion. He does not specify a time for the rebellion; it could be tomorrow or several generations down the road. But when he dies three days after delivering his speech, the animals immediately set to work on bringing about the rebellion, driving Jones and the farmhands off the farm and removing many of the implements of his rule.

The Seven Commandments that Snowball transcribes, which are supposed to encompass Major's general philosophy, are gradually altered and deformed under Napoleon until they have entirely different meanings from those originally intended. "Beasts of England", the song that came to Major in his dream, is later banned on Animal Farm by Napoleon and replaced by "Comrade Napoleon", a hymn composed by Minimus the pig that pledges allegiance to Animal Farm and to work to protect it.

Major's skull is dug up and saluted by the animals every day, even after the rebellion, as a sign of respect that the animals remember their roots and the roots of the Rebellion. Later, after Napoleon decides to accept the humans and strike bargains with them, he announces that the remains are to be disposed of because they represent the old days when Animal Farm was "violent and primitive" toward humans; toward the end of the story, Napoleon announces that he has reburied the skull.

In both film adaptations featuring Major, he dies while provoking the animals into rebelling. In the 1954 adaption (voiced by Maurice Denham), he dies suddenly while the animals are singing. In the 1999 version (voiced by Peter Ustinov), Farmer Jones slips in mud while investigating the sounds coming from the barn, setting off his shotgun and indirectly hitting Major in his backside so that he staggers backward and falls from the top of the barn to his death; the site where he fell is whitewashed by Squealer to mark it as a patriotic location.
