= Animal Farm (1954 film) =

1954 animated film by Halas and Batchelor

- Poster
- Directed by: John Halas; Joy Batchelor
- Written by: Joy Batchelor; John Halas; Borden Mace; Philip Stapp; Lothar Wolff
- Based on: Animal Farm by George Orwell
- Produced by: John Halas; Joy Batchelor
- Starring: Maurice Denham
- Music by: Mátyás Seiber
- Production company: Halas and Batchelor
- Distributed by: Associated British-Pathé (United Kingdom); Louis de Rochemont Associates; Distributors Corporation of America (United States)
- Release dates: 29 December 1954 (New York City); 7 January 1955 (London)
- Running time: 72 minutes
- Countries: United Kingdom; United States
- Language: English
- Budget: $350,000

Animal Farm is a 1954 animated film directed and produced by John Halas and Joy Batchelor, funded in part by the Central Intelligence Agency (CIA), who also revised the original script. Based on the 1945 novella Animal Farm by George Orwell, the film is narrated by Gordon Heath, with the voices of animals provided by Maurice Denham.

The rights for a film adaptation were purchased from Orwell's widow, Sonia, after she was approached by agents working for the Office of Policy Coordination, a branch of the CIA that used culture to combat communism.

Despite being a box office failure, taking fifteen years to generate a profit, the film became a staple in classrooms.

== Plot ==
Manor Farm is mismanaged by its drunken owner, Mr. Jones. Prize pig Old Major encourages the farm animals to rebel against Jones and take over the farm, teaching them the revolutionary song "Beasts of England" before he dies from a heart attack. When Mr. Jones forgets to feed the animals the next morning, Major's successor Snowball leads the animals into the storehouse for food, before leading them into chasing away Jones, who returns later with neighbouring farmers in attempt to retake the farm. The animals defeat the invaders, rename the farm "Animal Farm", and destroy the tools of oppression that had been used against them. They decide against living in the farmhouse, though Saddleback boar Napoleon is interested and begins to secretly raise an orphaned litter of puppies as attack dogs while helping himself to Jones's jam storage.

The Seven Commandments of Animalism are written on a barn wall, the most important being "All animals are equal". The animals cooperate to run the farm and produce plenty of food, but the pigs, led by Napoleon and his second-in-command Squealer, avoid physical labor yet claim leadership and special foods such as milk "by virtue of their brainwork". As the winter causes work to slow, Snowball holds a meeting where he promises electric power at the cost of harder work and rationing in the meantime, which Napoleon opposes. When the animals decide to proceed in favour of Snowball, Napoleon has his dogs chase Snowball from the farm and kill him, before declaring himself leader of Animal Farm and denouncing Snowball as a traitor. He promptly abolishes farm policy meetings, appropriates all decision-making, and advances Snowball's plan for a windmill as his own.

Work begins on the windmill, spearheaded by Boxer the workhorse and Benjamin the donkey who work overtime, while the pigs consume more food and appropriate more luxuries for themselves. When Boxer and Benjamin find the pigs sleeping on beds in the farmhouse, the pigs alter the Commandment "No animal shall sleep in a bed" to "No animal shall sleep in a bed WITH SHEETS". Napoleon starts trading some of the hens' eggs for jam from local businessman Mr. Whymper without their consent, prompting the hens to revolt against the pigs before Napoleon's dogs intervene. To impose his will through fear, Napoleon holds a show trial of the hens, where a sheep and a duck also confess to dissenting; they are all executed by the dogs, and the victims' blood is used to change one of the Commandments into "No animal shall kill another animal WITHOUT CAUSE". Fearful of a potential counter-revolution, Napoleon also bans "Beasts of England" under penalty of death, arbitrarily declaring the revolution complete and the dream of Animal Farm realised.

Later, farmers jealous of Mr. Whymper's profits attack Animal Farm. The animals ambush and repel the farmers at the cost of numerous casualties, while Jones drunkenly blows up the windmill with himself inside. The animals are forced to rebuild the windmill, including Boxer, whose injuries and age cause an accident that forces him to retire. Napoleon calls a van to take Boxer away, which Benjamin recognises as being from Whymper's glue factory; he and the other animals try to save him, but to no avail. Squealer delivers a sham eulogy in which he claims Boxer's last words were to glorify Napoleon. The animals see through the propaganda but are forced into compliance by the dogs. That night, the pigs toast to Boxer's memory with whisky they traded for his life.

Several years later, Napoleon rules Animal Farm under a cult of personality and has expanded its influence into neighbouring farms owned by pigs who now act almost identically to humans, walking upright on two legs and wearing clothes. During one pig ceremony, Benjamin and the animals, now famished after constant harsh labour and rationing, are horrified to learn that the pigs have reduced the Commandments to one single phrase: "All animals are equal, but some animals are more equal than others". Benjamin spies on the pigs' dinner party, where Napoleon is congratulated for having the hardest-working and lowest-consuming animals in the country, and the pigs toast to a future of similar pig-owned farms everywhere. Benjamin has a hallucination of Napoleon and the pigs all turning into Jones. Realizing the only thing the revolution accomplished was trading one tyrant for another, Benjamin rallies the farm animals and others from nearby farms to storm the farmhouse while the dogs are too drunk to respond. The animals smash through the house and kill Napoleon and his followers as Benjamin stands with triumph.

== Cast ==
- (United Kingdom) Gordon Heath as Narrator
- (United Kingdom) Maurice Denham as Snowball
  - Old Major
  - Napoleon
  - Snowball
  - Squealer
  - Benjamin
  - Boxer
  - Mr. Jones
  - Mr. Whymper
  - Mr. Frederick
  - Mr. Pilkington
  - The mother dog
  - The sheep
  - The chickens (i.e., hens, cockerel)
  - The cows

== Production ==
=== Development ===
After Orwell died in 1950, his widow Sonia Orwell sold the film rights to Animal Farm to film executives Carleton Alsop and Finis Farr, undercover agents for the Central Intelligence Agency's Office of Policy Coordination which funded anti-communist art for E. Howard Hunt's Psychological Warfare Workshop. Hunt chose The March of Time newsreel producer Louis de Rochemont and his company as a front organization for production. De Rochemont agreed so that he could release frozen pounds earned from ticket sales of his previous film, Lost Boundaries, which were required to be spent on film productions staged in the United Kingdom.

John Halas and Joy Batchelor were chosen to direct because of their work on documentaries produced by the Marshall Plan and the British Ministry of Information. The CIA distrusted American animators and illustrators due to the Red Scare and the Hollywood blacklist. Halas and Batchelor hired John F. Reed, the sole involved American, from Walt Disney Productions, who led a team of eighty animators from The Rank Organisation's disbanded animation division. Despite their background, Halas, Batchelor and the animation crew were kept unaware of the CIA's involvement.

=== Filming ===
Halas and Batchelor were awarded the contract to produce the film in November 1951, and production ended in April 1954. Animation was done in London while camera work took place in Gloucestershire. Hunt later said that the film was "carefully tweaked to heighten the anti-Communist message". During production, De Rochemont, acting on behalf of the CIA, rewrote the film from the original novel's plot by Philip Strapp and Lothar Wolf to end with the other animals successfully revolting against the pigs. Batchelor strongly opposed the change, though Halas later defended it. Fredric Warburg, original publisher of the novel and a former MI6 agent, served as a consultant, suggesting that Old Major be given an appearance similar to Winston Churchill. One proposed scene would have shown Snowball in exile in a "tropical country", where he would be visited by a benign-looking pig who would suddenly reveal himself to be one of Napoleon's dogs and tear Snowball's throat out, emulating the assassination of Trotsky.

The CIA investors were allegedly initially greatly concerned that Snowball was presented too sympathetically in early scripts, such as how Batchelor's script implied Snowball was "intelligent, dynamic, courageous". A memo declared that Snowball must be presented as a "fanatic intellectual whose plans if carried through would have led to disaster no less complete than under Napoleon." This caused some debate with screenwriter Lothar Wolff objecting, but the filmmakers agreed to rewrite some of Snowball’s scenes to portray him as "more dominating and officious” while the finished film does not take a stance on the practicality of his plans.

The investors wanted the film to distinguish between "good and bad farmers", attributed to their concern of possible offence to American audiences involved in agriculture. They insisted that Jones should be shown as the only bad farmer, with the other human antagonists being farmhands, and that the film should show more sympathetic farmers shunning Jones. The investors wanted it shown that not all animals had cause to revolt, which resulted in the addition of a sequence where some animals on other farms dismissed news of the rebellion.

The film’s narration was partly re-written by de Rochemont collaborator John Stuart Martin, whose contributions were contentious and sometimes cut due to being deemed too heavy-handed by the filmmakers. Martin’s proposed narration frequently demonized Napoleon and made explicit references to “purges” and a “fenced-in state.” One of his proposed lines was for the pigs to drink to Boxer’s memory “with the whiskey they had bought with Boxer’s blood” which was toned down to “Boxer’s life.”

== Release ==
The film was rated "U" (Universal), which the British film classification system used for films fit for audiences of all ages.

Much of the pre-release promotion for the film in the UK focused on it being a British film instead of a product of the Hollywood studios.

Scenes from Animal Farm, along with the 1954 TV programme Nineteen Eighty-Four, were featured in "The Two Winstons", the final episode of Simon Schama's program A History of Britain broadcast 18 June 2002.

Four decades after the release of Animal Farm, Cold War historian Tony Shaw discovered, through looking at archives of the film, that the CIA, who secretly purchased the rights to the film, altered the ending of the film so that the pigs, who represent communists, were overthrown by the other animals on the farm.

== Reception and legacy ==
Film critic C. A. Lejeune wrote at the time: "I salute Animal Farm as a fine piece of work... [the production team] have made a film for the eye, ear, heart and mind". Matyas Seiber's score and Maurice Denham's vocal performance have been praised specifically (Denham provided every voice and animal noise in the film). The animation style has been described as "Disney-turned-serious". The movie holds a 67% score at Rotten Tomatoes based on 12 critic reviews.

Some criticism was levelled at the altered ending, with one paper reporting, "Orwell would not have liked this one change, with its substitution of commonplace propaganda for his own reticent, melancholy satire".

The film was a box office failure, posting the lowest financial loss in fiscal year 1954. Its budget was recovered fifteen years after its release.

=== Comic strip adaptation ===
In 1954, Harold Whitaker, one of the film's animators, adapted the film into a comic strip published in various British regional newspapers.

=== In popular culture ===
The band The Clash used an image from the film on their 45-RPM single "English Civil War".

=== Home media ===
Animal Farm (1954) was released on Super 8 film in the 1970s, and received several home video releases in the UK and America. American VHS releases were produced by Media Home Entertainment, Vestron Video, Burbank Video and Wham! USA Entertainment. In the United States, the film was first released to DVD by 2002 by Sterling Entertainment Group, under license by the estate of Halas and Bachelor. Universal Pictures Home Entertainment released the film on DVD in the UK in 2003. In 2004, Home Vision Entertainment released a "Special Edition" DVD of the movie in the United States, also licensed from Halas and Bachelor, which also included a documentary hosted by Tony Robinson. That same year, Digiview Entertainment released a DVD of Animal Farm, and because the film had received a Super 8 release in the 1970s and possibly due to it being released through Distributors Corporation of America, Digiview had assumed that it was in the public domain. It turned out that Halas and Batchelor's estate still owned the film's copyright, so it filed and won a lawsuit against Digiview, which filed for bankruptcy later that year.

In 2014, a 60th-anniversary Blu-ray was released by Network Distributing in the UK only.

=== 1999 film ===
A live-action version of the film was released on 3 October 1999, directed by John Stephenson. The film stars Kelsey Grammer, Ian Holm, Julia Louis-Dreyfus, Patrick Stewart, Julia Ormond, Paul Scofield, Pete Postlethwaite and Peter Ustinov.

== See also ==
- List of British films of 1954
- Halas and Batchelor
- List of American films of 1954
- Office of Policy Coordination
- Information Research Department
