= Alexander Raskatov =

Russian composer (born 1953)

Alexander Mikhailovich Raskatov
- Алекса́ндр Миха́йлович Раска́тов
- Born: March 9, 1953 (age 73); Moscow
- Education: Moscow Conservatory
- Occupation: Composer

Alexander Mikhailovich Raskatov (Russian: Алекса́ндр Миха́йлович Раска́тов; born 9 March 1953) is a Russian composer.

== Life ==
Alexander Raskatov was born on 9 March 1953 in Moscow. His father was a leading journalist of the magazine Krokodil, his mother was a medical doctor and war hero of World War II. Raskatov studied composition under Albert Leman and Tikhon Khrennikov at the Moscow Conservatory. In 1990 he was composer in residence at Stetson University and 1998 in Lockenhaus. Raskatov was a member of the Union of Soviet Composers; after the collapse of the Soviet Union he is a member of the Composers' Union of Russia. In the early nineties he moved to Germany, then to France in 2004. Raskatov is a member of the Russian Authors' Agency (RAO).

== Musical style ==
Raskatov’s music, especially his sound development, is influenced by Modest Mussorgsky and Anton Webern. His vocal works are often based on texts of Russian poets like Alexander Blok or Joseph Brodsky. His viola concerto 'Path-Put-Chemin-Weg' was commissioned on the occasion of the 50th birthdays of Yuri Bashmet and Valeri Gergiev and premiered in Le Chatelet in January 2003. A documentary on the concerto was recorded by the Dutch National Television (NTR) and can be viewed via the link

Irina Schnittke, Alfred Schnittke’s widow, entrusted him with the reconstruction of Schnittke’s Ninth Symphony of 1998, which he finished in 2007.

In June 2010 his opera A Dog's Heart received its world premiere at the Dutch National Opera, Amsterdam, in a co-production with the English National Opera, where it was seen in November 2010. The production, by Simon McBurney, has also been staged at the Teatro alla Scala in Milan (in March 2013 starring Paulo Szot), and the Opéra National de Lyon (in January 2014).

One of his most recent musical pieces, entitled 'A White Nights Dream', was premiered at the Royal Festival Hall (London, UK; cond. Vladimir Jurowski) in September 2011. This led to the commission of another work, Green Mass, which was premiered by Jurowski and the LPO along with the Choir of Clare College, Cambridge in 2016.

== Selected works ==
Opera

- Animal Farm, Opera in 2 acts (nine scenes with an epilogue), libretto in English by Ian Burton after a novella by George Orwell
- The Pit and the Pendulum (Колодец и маятник), Opera in 5 episodes (1989–1991); libretto in Russian by Alexei Parin after the story by Edgar Allan Poe
- A Dog's Heart (Собачье сердце), Opera in 2 acts (18 scenes with an epilogue) (2008–2009); libretto in Russian by Cesare Mazzonis after the story by Mikhail Bulgakov

Orchestral

- Xenia for chamber orchestra (1991)
- Steady Time, 3 Orchestral Interludes (2007)

Wind ensemble

- Paradise Lost? (1999)
- Pro–kofiev et Contra–kofiev (1999)

Concertante

- Night Hymns, Chamber Concerto for piano and 11 instruments (1982–1984)
- Concerto for oboe and 15 strings (1987)
- 6 Psalmodies for viola, harp and 15 strings (1990)
- Commentary on a Vision for solo percussion and orchestra (1991)
- Miserere for viola, cello and orchestra (1992)
- Farewell from the Birds of Passage for alto saxophone, percussion and string orchestra (1994)
- Primal Song (Urlied) for viola and 15 strings (1995)
- Blissful Music for cello and chamber orchestra (1997)
- Swinging the Dream Pendulum for violin, string orchestra, piano, celesta and harpsichord (1998)
- Ritual II for 4 saxophones, percussion, piano and string orchestra (1998–1999)
- 5 Minuten aus dem Leben von W.A.M. (not a "not-turno") for violin solo, string orchestra and percussion (2001)
- Concerto "Path" (Путь; Chemin; Weg) for viola and orchestra (2002)
- Gens extorris for piano and string orchestra (2005)
- Bel Canto for viola, string orchestra and temple gong (2008)
- In Excelsis, Concerto for violin and orchestra (2008)
- Night Butterflies, Concerto for piano and orchestra (2013)

Chamber music

- Byline for cello and piano (1974)
- Little Triptych for oboe solo (1975)
- Canti for viola solo (1978)
- Dramatic Games, Sonata for cello (1979)
- 4 Bagatelles for 2 violins and bassoon (1980)
- Invitation to a Concert for 2 percussionists (1981)
- Remembrance of an Alpine Rose for 6 percussionists, a musical box (or barrel organ) and tape (1982)
- Muta III for 3 flutes (1986)
- Sentimental Sequences for chamber ensemble (1986)
- 2 Pieces for double bass and piano (1986)
- Sonata for Yuri Bashmet for viola and piano (1988)
- Glosses for bassoon solo (1989)
- Dolce far niente for cello and piano (1991)
- Kyrie eleison for cello solo (1992)
- Madrigal in Metal for five percussionists (1993)
- Eco perpetuo for basson, bass clarinet, percussion, harp, piano, cello and double bass (1993)
- "... I Will See a Rose at the End of the Path ..." for string quartet (1994)
- Xcos for cello and accordion (1994)
- Litania for chamber ensemble (1994)
- Path for 2 cellos and harpsichord (1994)
- Before Thy Throne for violin and percussion (1999)
- Ode to Valentine's Day for 8 cellos and a bottle of champagne (2004)
- Time of Falling Flowers for 6 instrumentalists (2006)
- Cosmogony According to Chagall for chamber ensemble

Keyboard

- Two Pieces for piano (1980)
- Piano Sonata (1981)
- Consolation for piano (1989)
- Punctuation Marks for harpsichord (1989)
- Misteria brevis for piano and percussion (1 performer) (1992)
- Credo in Byzantinum for harpsichord or piano (1995)
- Recordare for piano (2006)

Vocal

- Courtly Songs for soprano and chamber ensemble (1976)
- Starry World for tenor and piano (1977)
- Circle of Singing (Part I) for mezzo-soprano, cello, piano, harpsichord and celesta (1984); words by Vasily Zhukovsky and Evgeny Baratynsky
- Elegies for high voice and piano (1984)
- Book of Spring for tenor and chamber ensemble (1985); words by Vasily Zhukovsky
- Stabat mater, Five Fragments by Samuel Taylor Coleridge for counter-tenor and string trio (1988)
- Gra-ka-kha-ta for tenor and four percussionists (1988); text by Velimir Khlebnikov
- Let There Be Night, Five Fragments by Samuel Taylor Coleridge for counter-tenor (or mezzo-soprano) and string trio (1989)
- "66" for soprano and twelve instruments on a Sonnet by William Shakespeare (1990)
- Txetru – Urtext for soprano and percussion (1 performer), clarinet, bass clarinet, viola, cello and double bass (1992)
- Seven Stages of "Hallelujah" for soprano with percussion and piano (1993)
- Pas de deux for soprano with bells and saxophone (1994); words by Antonin Artaud
- Sonnenuntergangslieder (Songs of Sunset) for mezzo-soprano, viola and piano (1995); words by Friedrich Hölderlin
- Gebet (Kaddish) (Prayer) for soprano and string quartet (1996)
- Resurrexi for soprano, mezzo-soprano and chamber ensemble (1996–1997)
- Quasi Hamlet for soprano, flute, accordion, percussion and double bass (1997)
- Ritual for voice and percussion (1 performer) (1997); words by Velimir Khlebnikov
- Praise for 4 male voices and church bells (1998)
- Circle of Singing (Part II) for baritone and piano (2000); texts by Alexander Pushkin and F. Tyuchev
- Voices of a Frozen Land for 7 singers, wind ensemble and percussion (2001)
- In nomine for 8 singers, wind ensemble and percussion (2001)
- "... and meadows merge into the sky ..." for soprano and string quartet (2004); words by Gennadi Aigi, Evgeny Baratynsky and Vasily Zhukovsky
- Nunc dimittis "In Memoriam Alfred Schnittke" for mezzo-soprano, male voices and orchestra (2007); words by Joseph Brodsky and Starets Siluan
- Green Mass, a work for soloists, choir and orchestra (2016); additional texts by various poets

Arrangements and reconstructions

- Modest Mussorgsky – Songs and Dances of Death for bass and orchestra (1877); arranged 2007; words by Arseni Golenishchev-Kutuzov
- Sergei Prokofiev – Sonata for cello, wind ensemble and double bass (1999); arrangement of the Sonata No.2 in C major for cello and piano, Op.119 (1949)

(2007)

- Alfred Schnittke – Symphony No. 9 (1997/98), reconstruction (2007)
- Dmitri Shostakovich – String Quartet No.7 in F♯ minor, Op.108 (1960); arrangement for string orchestra (2001)
