= Andy Richardson (writer) =

British writer, promoter and publisher

Andy Richardson is a British writer, promoter and publisher.

He worked with the actor Pete Postlethwaite to ghostwrite his autobiography, A Spectacle of Dust (published Orion, 2011) and among other titles also ghostwrote John Lydon's I Could Be Wrong, I Could Be Right (published A Way With Media, 2020). He has worked at New Musical Express, where his cover features included Prince, Bono, Oasis and Radiohead. He has worked for British and international newspapers and magazines. He publishes cook books for Michelin-starred restaurants.

== Work with the band Oasis ==
Richardson worked with the band Oasis in 1996–1998, becoming the first journalist to report on their worldwide hit (What's the Story) Morning Glory?, in interviews with Noel Gallagher. He is an investigative reporter and journalist, having completed assignments around the world.

== Collaboration with Pete Postlethwaite ==
Richardson worked with Postlethwaite for two years prior to the publication of the actor's memoir on 23 June 2011. The Guardian's film critic Peter Bradshaw observed Richardson's sympathetic treatment and described the memoir as "an extrovert, tender, charming and unselfconscious book, with some extraordinary, hell-raising and hair-raising anecdotes", and The Evening Standard noted that "The closing chapter is deeply wrenching". The book featured on The Sunday Times best-seller list and was recommended as one of its Books of the Year for 2011. The newspaper's tribute noted Richardson's contribution in finishing the book on behalf of Postlethwaite, who died prior to its completion. It reported "The final chapter, as Postlethwaite succumbs to cancer, is immensely moving".

== Cook book publisher ==
As a cook book publisher, he has worked with many of the UK's Michelin-starred chefs. In 2015, his company, Away With Media, published the debut cook book from Stephen Terry, titled Inspired... By.
