= Animal Farm (2025 film) =

Film by Andy Serkis

- American theatrical release poster
- Directed by: Andy Serkis
- Screenplay by: Nicholas Stoller
- Based on: Animal Farm by George Orwell
- Produced by: Jonathan Cavendish; Adam Nagle; Peter Nagle; Dave Rosenbaum; Andy Serkis
- Starring: Seth Rogen; Gaten Matarazzo; Steve Buscemi; Glenn Close; Laverne Cox; Kieran Culkin; Woody Harrelson; Jim Parsons; Andy Serkis; Kathleen Turner; Iman Vellani
- Edited by: Kevin Pavlovic
- Music by: Heitor Pereira
- Production companies: Aniventure; The Imaginarium Studios; Cinesite
- Distributed by: Angel Studios (United States and Canada); Vue Lumière (United Kingdom)
- Release dates: 9 June 2025 (Annecy); 1 May 2026 (United States); 24 July 2026 (United Kingdom)
- Running time: 94 minutes
- Countries: Canada; United Kingdom; United States
- Language: English
- Budget: $35 million
- Box office: $6.5 million

Animal Farm is a 2025 animated satirical dark comedy film directed by Andy Serkis and written by Nicholas Stoller, loosely based on the 1945 novella by George Orwell. The cast includes Seth Rogen, Gaten Matarazzo, Steve Buscemi, Glenn Close, Laverne Cox, Kieran Culkin, Woody Harrelson, Jim Parsons, Serkis, Kathleen Turner, and Iman Vellani. It is the third adaptation of the novella, following the 1954 animated film, and the 1999 live-action television film. This version introduces an alternative, coming-of-age plot with original, new characters such as a piglet called Lucky, who is the film's main protagonist.

Animal Farm premiered at the Annecy International Animation Film Festival on 9 June 2025, and was released in the United States and Canada on 1 May 2026, by Angel Studios. The film received generally negative reviews from critics and grossed $6.5 million against a $35 million budget.

== Plot ==
Farmer Jones fails to make his mortgage payments on Manor Farm, which is repossessed by the bank and scheduled to be sold to Pilkington Industries. Ruthless billionaire Frieda Pilkington intends to kill the animals, who believe they're being taken on vacation to a "laughterhouse". A sow named Snowball realises the truth and convinces the animals to rebel against the humans. They drive the human owners from the place and rename it 'Animal Farm'. They elect Snowball and the boar Napoleon co-leaders and establish an autonomous government with a legal code of seven rules intended to prevent them becoming like humans.

The animals struggle to run the farm on their own. Napoleon objects to Snowball's plan to build a watermill for electricity and convinces other animals Snowball is hindering their freedom. Napoleon pressures Snowball into leaving and assumes sole control of Animal Farm. Mr. Whymper, a worker from the bank, tells the pigs that the bank requires the farm to pay $1,000 per month for the next thirty years, or it will be repossessed again. Snowball's former protégé, Lucky, whom Napoleon considers like a son, suggests they raise the funds by operating a market. It succeeds and Napoleon moves all the pigs into the farmhouse, and they use their extra money to shop at Pilkington's mall. Pilkington allies with Napoleon and the pigs, giving them free things in hopes of reacquiring the farm someday.

With the help of his lackey Squealer, Napoleon warps the rules of Animal Farm to favour pigs and humans. Life becomes miserable for other animals while Napoleon and the pigs enjoy an affluent lifestyle, behaving more humanlike. They walk on two legs, wear clothes, and drink alcohol. Lucky questions the regime when fellow pig Puff rejects their new living conditions. Napoleon tells Lucky he plans to sell all of the animals that are not pigs, after rebuilding the watermill into a dam as promised to Pilkington.

Despondent after escaping Napoleon's dogs, Lucky is motivated by the elderly donkey Benjamin to rebel against Napoleon, apologises to the other animals about his behaviour and stages a plan to ridicule Napoleon as he addresses Pilkington's company over the new hydroelectric dam. Lucky and Puff humiliate Napoleon while the animals, led by Benjamin and Carl, stuff the dam with fireworks, but the dam breaks as they ignite with Randolph inside, flooding the farm and destroying Pilkington's company. Pilkington tries to escape the flood with her drone Moses but falls into the water. Lucky confronts Napoleon on the water tower and confesses the truth that he treats Lucky like a son, but now Lucky, knowing the truth, wants him to leave. Enraged, Napoleon fights Lucky before he drowns when the water tower collapses. Lucky makes it to shore with the other animals while Mr. Whymper drifts away, leaving the farm in the animals' care.

Knowing that both Napoleon and Snowball are always not right, the animals look up towards the stars over a rising sun, uncertain but hopeful about their future.

== Voice cast ==
- Gaten Matarazzo as Lucky, a piglet torn between Napoleon and Snowball's teachings
- Seth Rogen as Napoleon, a boar and co-leader of the rebellion
- Kieran Culkin as Squealer, a boar and Napoleon's aide
- Woody Harrelson as Boxer, a cart-horse who is Benjamin and Lucky's friend
- Kathleen Turner as Benjamin, an elderly donkey and Boxer and Lucky's friend
- Iman Vellani as Puff and Tammy, twin sister show piglets and Lucky's friends
- Laverne Cox as Snowball, a co-leader of the rebellion
- Jim Parsons as:
  - Carl, a sheep
  - Carl's flock
- Andy Serkis as:
  - Randolph, a cockerel
  - Farmer Jones (uncredited), the original owner of the farm
- Steve Buscemi as Mr. Whymper, a banker and assistant to Pilkington
- Glenn Close as Freida Pilkington, Mr. Jones' neighbour and a billionaire

== Production ==
In July 2011, a feature film adaptation of George Orwell's 1945 novella Animal Farm was announced to be in development, with Rupert Wyatt serving as director. Wyatt and Andy Serkis, who had worked together on Rise of the Planet of the Apes (2011), were slated to serve as co-screenwriters. By October 2012, Serkis was announced to have taken over directorial duties, with the project being developed as a HFR-3D film. In August 2018, Netflix purchased distribution rights to the film. Serkis began pre-production on the project, after completing his directing duties for the Sony's Spider-Man Universe (SSU) film Venom: Let There Be Carnage (2021).

By April 2022, it was announced that production had commenced as an animated film at Cinesite Studios, with a screenplay written by Nicholas Stoller. Serkis also served as producer, alongside Adam Nagle, Dave Rosenbaum, and Jonathan Cavendish with both Stoller and Wyatt set to serve as executive producers. Connie Nartonis Thompson produced the film on behalf of Cinesite. The project is a joint-venture production between Cinesite, Aniventure, and the Imaginarium Productions, with Netflix dropping the distribution rights. In March 2023, during an interview with Screen Rant, Serkis stated that one year of production had passed while another year was left for the film. Deadline Hollywood reported in May 2024 that Animal Farm finished production.

In April 2025, the cast was announced, with Serkis, Seth Rogen, Steve Buscemi, Glenn Close, Iman Vellani, and Kieran Culkin among the additions.

== Music ==
Animal Farm (Soundtrack From The Angel Film)

Soundtrack album by Heitor Pereira
- Released: May 1, 2026
- Studio: AIR Studios
- Length: 69:25
- Label: Lakeshore Records
- Producer: Heitor Pereira

Heitor Pereira chronology
| Despicable Me 4 (2024) | Animal Farm (Soundtrack From The Angel Film) (2026) | The Angry Birds Movie 3 (2026) |

On June 2025, it was announced that Heitor Pereira will compose the score for the film. The soundtrack for the film was later released on May 1, 2026 from Lakeshore Records, with new songs from DJ Carl Cox and Pigeon John.

=== Track listing ===
All music is composed by Heitor Pereira, except as noted.

| No. | Title | Length |
|---|---|---|
| 1. | "Going on Vacation" | 3:13 |
| 2. | "Laughterhouse" | 1:11 |
| 3. | "Rebellion" | 2:04 |
| 4. | "Break Down the Barn" (Pigeon John) | 2:19 |
| 5. | "I Want That Farm" | 1:08 |
| 6. | "The Farmhouse" | 1:45 |
| 7. | "The Farm Commandments" | 1:37 |
| 8. | "About to Burst" | 0:59 |
| 9. | "Let's Farm!" | 1:49 |
| 10. | "Napoleon" | 2:52 |
| 11. | "Take All Our Worries Away" | 2:03 |
| 12. | "Build a Water Wheel" | 0:55 |
| 13. | "Construction Project" | 0:45 |
| 14. | "Farm Meeting" | 1:49 |
| 15. | "Give Us Grain" | 0:42 |
| 16. | "All Animals Are Equal" | 1:28 |
| 17. | "A Moment with Napoleon" | 1:35 |
| 18. | "A Visit from the Bank" | 2:30 |
| 19. | "Pigs Gotta Stick with Pigs" | 1:55 |
| 20. | "Time to Shop" | 0:49 |
| 21. | "Napoleon's Proposal" | 1:35 |
| 22. | "Stand Up to the Humans" | 1:36 |
| 23. | "The Water Wheel" | 1:57 |
| 24. | "Farmhouse Party" | 0:27 |
| 25. | "Winter Arrives" | 0:59 |
| 26. | "A Alliance Forms" | 0:59 |
| 27. | "No Grain, Big Surprise" | 0:50 |
| 28. | "The Rogues" (Carl Cox) | 6:18 |
| 29. | "The Inevitable" | 1:15 |
| 30. | "Napoleon is Always Right" | 2:00 |
| 31. | "Boxer Saves the Worker" | 1:47 |
| 32. | "Boxer is Hurt" | 2:08 |
| 33. | "End Up Like Them" | 1:49 |
| 34. | "Animal or Pig?" | 1:44 |
| 35. | "The Rebellion Starts Now" | 1:45 |
| 36. | "Drone Farm" (Carl Cox) | 4:16 |
| 37. | "Operation Party Pooper" | 1:16 |
| 38. | "Blue Danube" | 1:29 |
| 39. | "My Bunker My Party" (Carl Cox) | 5:33 |
| 40. | "The Dam Breaks" | 3:08 |
| 41. | "Not What They Seem" | 1:26 |
| 42. | "Animal Farm Song" | 1:23 |
| Total length: | | 69:25 |

== Release ==
Animal Farm had its world premiere on 9 June 2025, at the Annecy International Animation Film Festival. It premiered in the United Kingdom on 11 October 2025, at the BFI London Film Festival. In December 2025, Angel Studios acquired the U.S. theatrical distribution rights for the film. It was released on 1 May 2026. Vue Lumière released the film in the United Kingdom and Ireland on 24 July 2026.

== Reception ==
=== Box office ===
Animal Farm grossed $1.15 million from 2,600 theaters on its first day of release in the United States and Canada, including Thursday night previews.

=== Critical response ===
On the review aggregator website Rotten Tomatoes, 29% of 85 critics' reviews are positive, with an average rating of 4.1/10. The website's consensus reads: "All Animal Farm adaptations are equal, but some Animal Farm adaptations are more watchable than others." Metacritic, which uses a weighted average, assigned the film a score of 27 out of 100, based on 18 critics, indicating "generally unfavorable" reviews. Audiences polled by CinemaScore gave the film an average grade of "C-" on an A+ to F scale, the lowest grade ever for an animated film and for Angel Studios.

Peter Debruge of Variety wrote: "Serkis' 21st-century update dilutes Orwell's political allegory in favour of what passes for something more 'audience friendly': His approach adopts the celebrity voices, cutesy character designs and antic, mile-a-minute energy of big-studio American toons. The result isn't nearly as polished as Illumination or DreamWorks movies, but 'good enough for government work,' as the saying goes."

Pete Hammond of Deadline Hollywood wrote: "With a screenplay, alternately funny and frighteningly perceptive by Nicholas Stoller, this gorgeously animated version is not outwardly trying to be political but nevertheless is uncannily meeting its time and proving to be a little too close for comfort to America's drift toward authoritarianism." Rafael Motamayor's IGN review noted that Serkis shifts Orwell's allegory from Stalinism to modern corporate corruption, trading a dystopian tone for "something a little more uplifting". He praised the visuals and cast, but felt the adaptation "lost some teeth" compared to the novel.

Tim Robey, writing for The Daily Telegraph, gave it one out of five stars, heavily criticising the film: "A Trump-era makeover for this classic is totally misjudged, from terrible songs to toilet humour." Peter Bradshaw of The Guardian also gave it one out of five, criticising its "pretty cheapo digital look" and accusing Stoller and Serkis of "betray(ing) Orwell by outrageously blandifying and defanging its classic allegory of Stalinism and failed revolution with a dumb happy ending in the Disney style." Mark Kennedy rated the film zero out of four stars in an Associated Press review, writing that "screenwriter Nicholas Stoller and director Andy Serkis' awfully misguided Disneyfication of one of the greatest allegorical satires in the English language is a cinematic car crash." In Civitas Outlook, Titus Techera wrote that the film "completely betrayed Orwell's story."
