= Borden Mace =

American film producer

Francis Borden Mace, (July 23, 1920 – November 21, 2014) in Beaufort, North Carolina, was an American film producer. Mace died on November 21, 2014, in Salisbury, Connecticut.

Mace produced hundreds of films, many of them for the military, in a career spanning decades. During the post World War II period he worked on numerous projects with his mentor, producer Louis de Rochemont, notably on Alfred L. Werker's quasi-biographical Lost Boundaries, which was one of the first U.S. films to feature black actors in professional positions, and which was banned in Atlanta and Memphis. He was also involved in the production and story development of the 1954 Joy Batchelor and John Halas animated adaptation of Animal Farm. His last Hollywood project was John Ehle's The Journey of August King.

Mace, along with his friend Ehle, was instrumental in the founding in 1980, of the North Carolina School of Science and Mathematics (NCSSM), serving as the school's first principal and deputy director. The school's library is named after Mace.

Following his success with NCSSM, Mace was asked, in 1983, to advise in the founding of a similar school, the Illinois Mathematics and Science Academy in Aurora, Illinois, serving 1986–1987 as interim director.

In 1991, Mace again came out of retirement to advise on the establishment of the School of Filmmaking at the North Carolina School of the Arts.

Mace was married to Grace Breslin Wingerter who died in 2001. Mace died November 21, 2014, in Salisbury, Connecticut.
