= Snowball (Animal Farm) =

Character in George Orwell's 1945 novella Animal Farm

- First appearance: Animal Farm
- Created by: George Orwell
- Based on: Leon Trotsky
- Voiced by: Maurice Denham (1954 film); Kelsey Grammer (1999 film); Laverne Cox (2025 film)

In-universe information
- Species: Pig
- Gender: Male; Female (2025 film)

Snowball is a character in George Orwell's 1945 novella Animal Farm. He is largely based on Leon Trotsky, who led the opposition against Joseph Stalin (Napoleon). Snowball is depicted as an intellectual pig whose leadership, dedication, and feats for Animal Farm is unparallel to any others on the farm; however, he is rivalled by Napoleon, who hates him. In the 1954 film adaptation of Animal Farm, he was voiced by Maurice Denham, and was voiced by Kelsey Grammer in the 1999 television adaptation. The character is voiced by Laverne Cox and gender-swapped to a female in the 2025 film.

== Biography ==
The flag of Animal Farm designed by Snowball, made from Mrs. Jones' tablecloth

Snowball believes in a continued revolution: he argues that to defend Animal Farm, he must strengthen the reality of Old Major's dream of a life without humans and that they must stir up rebellions in other farms throughout England. However, Napoleon always disagrees with any ideas that Snowball has because he does not want Snowball to lead Animal Farm, wanting to lead it himself with an iron fist.

Snowball writes the Seven Commandments for Animal Farm, which are later altered by Squealer under the orders of Napoleon, to accommodate the actions of the pigs; the commandment stating "No animal shall drink alcohol" is changed to "No animal shall drink alcohol to excess", "No animal shall sleep in a bed" has been changed to "No animal shall sleep in a bed with sheets", and "No animal shall kill another animal" is changed to "No animal shall kill another animal without cause". Later all the commandments are replaced with one phrase: "All animals are equal, but some animals are more equal than others".

Once Napoleon gains control of Animal Farm he uses his guard dogs to attack Snowball, who flees to an unknown fate (in the 1954 film, he is killed), and manipulates the farm into believing what Snowball had done before was the cause of problems for the farm. Though Snowball had fought bravely for Animal Farm at the Battle of the Cowshed, Napoleon alters his account of the events to say Snowball had openly fought for Jones. Napoleon then conducts a purge of Snowball's supporters and has them executed as conspirators.

== Historical parallels with Trotsky ==
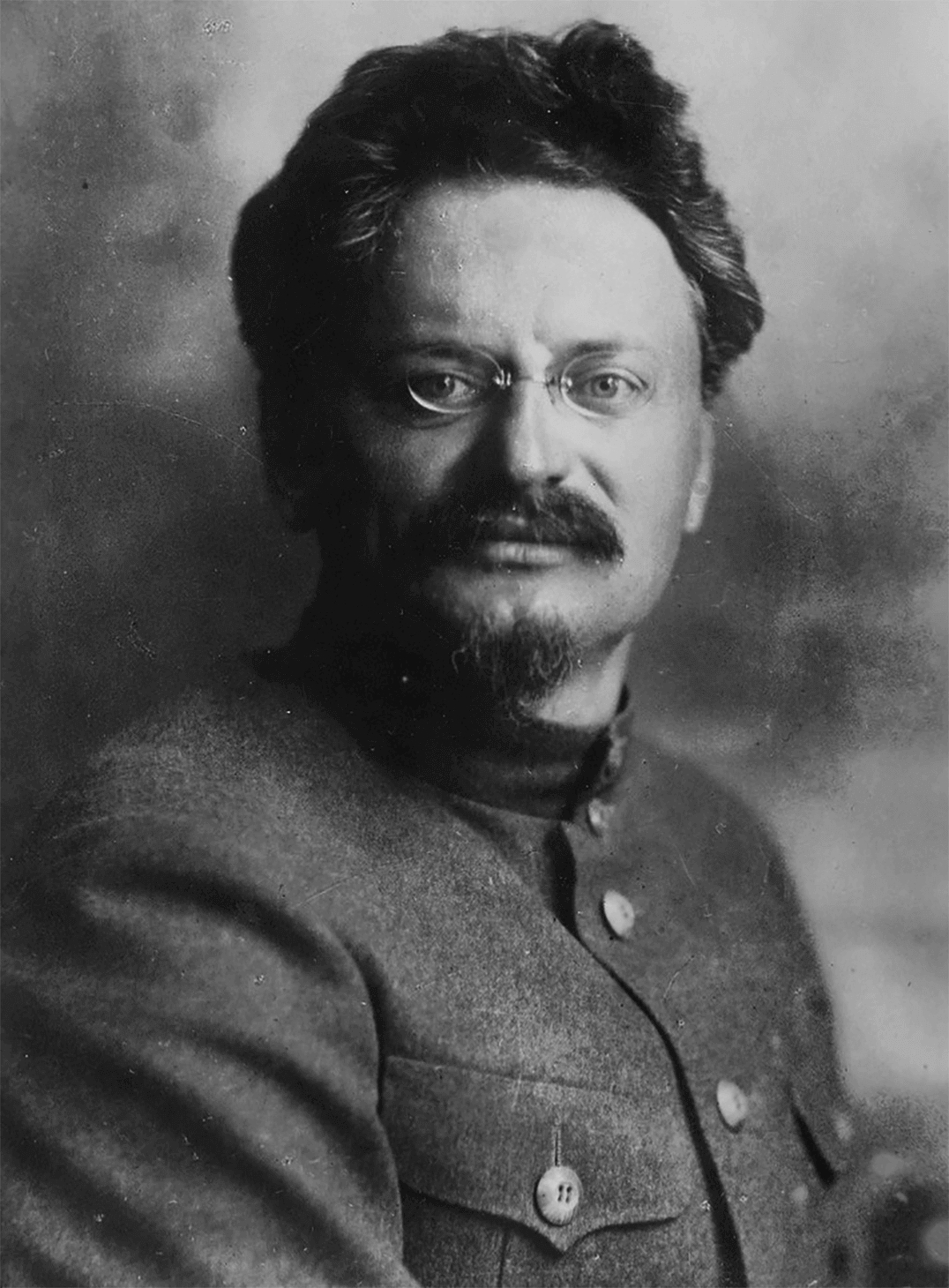
Trotsky served as the model for Snowball and was leader of the Left Opposition which advocated an alternative set of policies to Stalin

Orwell depicts Snowball in a sympathetic manner and superior to Napoleon in regards to personal intellect, rhetorical skills, economic theories, literary writings and military leadership. Orwell also highlighted the growing antagonism from Napoleon and Snowball such as the former’s frequent criticisms of Snowball’s economic plans, his eventual appropriation of the plans and later efforts to falsify history upon the latter’s exile. The personality traits and eventual defeat of Snowball mirrored the life of his historical counterpart Trotsky, including his contributions to the early Soviet Union and forced exile.

Yet, Orwell remained skeptical of any substantial differences between Snowball and Napoleon as he expressed the view to his friend George Woodcock: "Trotsky-Snowball was potentially as big a villain as Stalin-Napoleon, although he was Napoleon's victim. The first note of corruption was struck when the pigs secretly had the cows’ milk added to their own mash and Snowball consented to this first act of inequity."

However, literary critic Jeffrey Meyers who reviewed the political allegories in Orwell’s work stated that:

"Orwell ignores the fact that Trotsky passionately opposed Stalin's dictatorship from 1924 to 1940, which featured Siberian prison camps, the deliberately created Ukraine famine and the massive slaughter during the Moscow Purge Trials of 1937."

Meyers also added that Orwell drew on the views of a right-wing combatant to reinforce his arguments. In contrast, Meyers cited historian Isaac Deutscher's biographical account of Trotsky which presented him to be a much more civilised figure than Stalin and suggested that he would not have purged the Red Army generals or millions of Soviet citizens.

== In adaptations and pop culture ==
In the 1999 live-action film adaptation, he is shown escaping the dogs and surviving, though Napoleon declares him banished under pain of death. This live-action adaptation portrays the character more accurately to the book, including his survival.

When the novel Animal Farm was adapted for the screen in the 1950s, the CIA investors were greatly concerned that Snowball was presented too sympathetically in early script treatments and that Batchelor's script implied Snowball was "intelligent, dynamic, courageous". A memo declared that Snowball must be presented as a "fanatic intellectual whose plans if carried through would have led to disaster no less complete than under Napoleon." De Rochemont subsequently implemented these changes. The film, unlike the book, shows him being killed by the dogs, likely due to related pressure. Snowball's death mirrors the assassination of Leon Trotsky.

In the 2020 action horror film The Hunt, the characters allude to Animal Farm, with the main antagonist referring to the main protagonist as Snowball.
