= Pete Postlethwaite =

English actor (1946–2011)

Pete Postlethwaite OBE
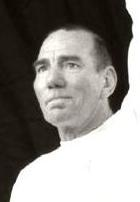
- Postlethwaite speaking at a Make Poverty History event in 2004
- Born: Peter William Postlethwaite; 7 February 1946; Warrington, Lancashire, England
- Died: 2 January 2011 (aged 64); Shrewsbury, Shropshire, England
- Education: Bristol Old Vic Theatre School
- Occupation: Actor
- Years active: 1975–2011
- Spouse: Jacqueline Morrish (m. 2003)
- Children: 2, including Billy Postlethwaite

Peter William Postlethwaite (7 February 1946 – 2 January 2011) was an English character actor. After various stage and minor television appearances, Postlethwaite's first major success arose through the film Distant Voices, Still Lives (1988), directed by Terence Davies. He had a breakthrough in Hollywood when he portrayed David in Alien 3 (1992), and his international reputation was further solidified when he was nominated for the Academy Award for Best Supporting Actor for his role as Giuseppe Conlon, father of Gerry Conlon, in In the Name of the Father (1993).

Following this role, he portrayed the mysterious lawyer Mr. Kobayashi in The Usual Suspects and went on to appear in a wide variety of films, including James and the Giant Peach, Dragonheart, Romeo + Juliet, Brassed Off, The Lost World: Jurassic Park, Amistad, The Shipping News, Dark Water, The Constant Gardener, and Inception. On television, Postlethwaite played Sergeant Obadiah Hakeswill on Sharpe. On stage, he was a member of the Royal Shakespeare Company from 1981 to 1987.

Director Steven Spielberg once called him "the best actor in the world". He was made an Officer of the Order of the British Empire in the 2004 New Year Honours list. Less than one month after his death, he was nominated for the BAFTA Award for Best Actor in a Supporting Role for his performance as gangster Fergie Colm in The Town (2010).

== Early life ==
Peter William Postlethwaite was born into a working-class Catholic family at 101 Norris Street in Warrington, Lancashire on 7 February 1946, the son of Mary Geraldine (née Lawless; 1913–2000) and cooper, wood machinist, and school caretaker William Postlethwaite (1913–1988). He had an older brother named Michael (1944–2006) and two older sisters, Patricia and Anne. He would later portray Irish characters on multiple occasions, leading some to mistakenly believe that he was of Irish descent.

Postlethwaite attended St Benedict's RC Junior School and a seminary, then joined West Park Grammar School in St Helens, where he enjoyed sports including rugby union. He spent an extra year re-sitting some of his O-levels, and then took four A-levels in English, history, geography, and French. Before his acting career, he trained as a teacher at St Mary's College, Strawberry Hill where his chosen subjects were physical education and drama (where he became the first male drama teacher). He initially trained to be a Catholic priest, but later settled on a career in acting. He trained as an actor at the Bristol Old Vic Theatre School in 1970.

He was a veteran of the Royal Shakespeare Company and other acting companies. On 13 January 1981, he took the leading role in a BBC TV black comedy by Alan Bleasdale, The Muscle Market, which was a spin-off from Boys from the Blackstuff; it was part of the Play for Today series.

After other early appearances in small parts for television programmes such as The Professionals and as Jack "Oily" Wragg in the Minder episode Back In Good Old England, Postlethwaite's first film success came with the film Distant Voices, Still Lives in 1988. He received an Academy Award nomination for his role in In the Name of the Father in 1993. He is well known for his role as mysterious lawyer Mr. Kobayashi in The Usual Suspects. He made appearances in several other successful films, including Alien 3, Amistad, Brassed Off, The Shipping News, The Constant Gardener, Inception, James and the Giant Peach and as Friar Lawrence in Baz Luhrmann's Romeo + Juliet.

== Career ==
Early in his career, Postlethwaite was advised to adopt a new surname for his acting work by his first agent and by peers who quipped that his name "would never be put up in lights outside theatres because they couldn't afford the electricity". He rejected the advice. He started his career at the Everyman Theatre in Liverpool, where his colleagues included Bill Nighy, Jonathan Pryce, Antony Sher, Matthew Kelly, and Julie Walters, having an intimate relationship with the latter during the mid-to-late 1970s.

In 2003, he toured Australia and New Zealand in a 90-minute one-man play, Scaramouche Jones, in which he played a clown trying to find out who he is before he dies at midnight, receiving a nomination for the TMA Award for Best Actor and winning the Theatregoers' Choice Award for Best Solo Performance. This was directed by Rupert Goold, who would also direct his Lear in 2008, in which Postlethwaite played every character. As well as Australia, the play toured Canada, New Zealand and the UK to great acclaim.

In The Art of Discworld (2004), Terry Pratchett wrote that he had always imagined Sam Vimes as "a younger, slightly bulkier version of Pete Postlethwaite".

Steven Spielberg, who directed Postlethwaite in 1997's The Lost World: Jurassic Park, called him "the best actor in the world". Postlethwaite quipped: "I'm sure what Spielberg actually said was, 'The thing about Pete is that he thinks he's the best actor in the world.'" Postlethwaite next starred in a Liverpool stage production of King Lear in 2008 at the Everyman Theatre, Liverpool, and at the Young Vic, London. He appeared in the climate change-themed film The Age of Stupid, which premiered in March 2009.

One of his more notable roles was Sergeant Obadiah Hakeswill in ITV's Sharpe series. The actor said this was one of his favourite roles and that he and fellow actor Sean Bean played well off each other because of their mutual love and respect. Bernard Cornwell, the author and creator of the Sharpe series, specifically wrote Hakeswill's character in later novels to reflect Postlethwaite's performance as the character in the TV series. Postlethwaite co-starred with Bean in When Saturday Comes.

Terminally ill, Postlethwaite made a return to Hollywood in three 2010 films, first as Spyros in Clash of the Titans. He next appeared in the blockbuster hit Inception as Maurice Fischer, an industrialist who is slowly dying. Lastly, his performance in The Town as florist and crime boss Fergus "Fergie" Colm was well received by critics, which would earn him a posthumous nomination for BAFTA Award for Best Actor in a Supporting Role, and making several publications' lists of Oscar predictions for Best Supporting Actor. His final appearance on screen was in Nick Hamm's film Killing Bono, based on the memoir of Neil McCormick. The role was written specially for Postlethwaite to accommodate his illness. The film was released on 1 April 2011. He was scheduled to be in the BBC series Exile, but had to pull out due to his declining health and was replaced by Jim Broadbent.

== Activism ==
Postlethwaite appeared as a taxi driver in a political broadcast for the Labour Party during the 1997 general election, and marched in London against the Iraq War in 2003.

In his later years, Postlethwaite was vocal in calling for action on climate change, and installed a wind turbine in his garden; he wrote in The Sun, "The stakes [of climate change] are very, very high. They're through the roof. How could we willingly know that we're going into extinction ... and let it happen?" At the UK premiere of The Age of Stupid in 2009, he told then-Secretary of State for Energy and Climate Change Ed Miliband that he would return his OBE and vote for any party other than Labour if the Kingsnorth coal-fired power station was given the go-ahead by the Labour government.

== Personal life ==
Postlethwaite lived in West Itchenor before moving near Bishop's Castle. He was a lifelong supporter of Liverpool F.C. He began a relationship with former BBC producer Jacqueline Morrish in 1987, and they were married in 2003 at St Nicholas' Church in West Itchenor. They had a son, actor Billy Postlethwaite (born in 1989), and a daughter (born in 1996).

== Health issues and death ==
Postlethwaite was diagnosed with testicular cancer in 1990, and had his right testicle removed. A life-long smoker since he was 10, he said during a 2009 interview with Scotland on Sunday, "We've got to hope the next generation will do things differently. I'm sure that in 20 years' time the kids will say: 'Can you believe that people actually used to smoke – put these funny little things in their mouths, lit them and sucked all that crap into their lungs?"

Postlethwaite was diagnosed with pancreatic cancer in March 2009, and continued acting for the next year and a half, showing clear signs of weight loss during his final performances. On 2 January 2011, at the age of 64, he died at the Royal Shrewsbury Hospital in Shrewsbury. In his final two years, he worked on his memoir A Spectacle of Dust with writer Andy Richardson, which was published in June 2011.

== Awards ==
Postlethwaite was made an Officer of the Order of the British Empire in the 2004 New Year Honours list and received an Honorary Fellowship in recognition of outstanding contribution to the dramatic arts by Liverpool John Moores University in 2005 and an honorary degree from the University of Liverpool in 2006. He received an Academy Award nomination for his role In the Name of the Father and was posthumously nominated for a BAFTA Award for his performance in The Town.

== Filmography ==
=== Film ===
Year	Title	Role	Notes
1975	The Racer	Ecco	Short film
1977	The Duellists	Man Shaving General Treillard	Credited as Peter Postlethwaite
1978	Doris and Doreen	Mr. Lomax	Television film
1983	Fords on Water	Winston's Boss	Credited as Peter Postlethwaite
1984	A Private Function	Douglas J. Nuttal	
1985	King David	Isai	
1985	Cyrano de Bergerac	Ragueneau	Television film
1987	Coast to Coast	Kecks McGuinness	Television film
1988	Distant Voices, Still Lives	Father	
1988	Tumbledown	Major at Rehabilitation Centre	Television film
1988	To Kill a Priest	Josef	Credited as Peter Postlethwaite
1988	The Dressmaker	Jack	Credited as Peter Postlethwaite
1988	Number 27	Becket	
1990	Hamlet	Player King	
1990	Treasure Island	George Merry	Television film Credited as Peter Postlethwaite
1991	The Grass Arena	The Dipper	Television film
1991	A Child from the South	Harry	Television film
1991	They Never Slept	Panter	Television film
1992	Split Second	Paulsen	
1992	Alien 3	David	
1992	Waterland	Henry Crick	Credited as Peter Postlethwaite
1992	The Last of the Mohicans	Captain Beams	
1993	Anchoress	William Carpenter	
1993	In the Name of the Father	Giuseppe Conlon	Nominated – Academy Award for Best Supporting Actor
1994	Suite 16	Glover	
1994	Sin Bin	Mitch	Television film
1994	Sharpe's Company	Sergeant Obadiah Hakeswill	Television film
1994	Sharpe's Enemy	Sergeant Obadiah Hakeswill	Television film
1995	The Usual Suspects	Mr. Kobayashi	National Board of Review Award for Best Cast
1996	When Saturday Comes	Ken Jackson	
1996	James and the Giant Peach	Magic Man; Narrator	
1996	Dragonheart	Brother Gilbert of Glockenspur	
1996	Crimetime	Sidney	
1996	Romeo + Juliet	Friar Lawrence	
1996	Brassed Off	Danny	
1997	The Serpent's Kiss	Thomas Smithers	
1997	The Lost World: Jurassic Park	Roland Tembo	Nominated – Saturn Award for Best Supporting Actor
1997	Bastard	Sincai	
1997	Amistad	William S. Holabird	
1998	Among Giants	Ray	
1999	Lost for Words	Deric Longden	Television film Nominated – British Academy Television Award for Best Actor
1999	Alice in Wonderland	The Carpenter	Television film
1999	Butterfly Collectors	John McKeown	Television film
1999	Wayward Son	Ben Alexander	
1999	The Divine Ryans	Uncle Reg Ryan	
1999	Animal Farm	Farmer Jones; Benjamin	Television film
2000	When the Sky Falls	Martin Shaughnessy	
2000	Rat	Hubert Flynn	
2001	Cowboy Up	Reid Braxton	
2001	The Shipping News	Tert Card	
2002	Triggermen	Ben Cutler	
2002	Between Strangers	John	
2003	The Selfish Giant	Arthur	Short film
2004	The Limit	Gale	
2004	Strange Bedfellows	Russell McKenzie	
2005	Dark Water	Veeck	
2005	The Constant Gardener	Dr. Lorbeer / Dr. Brandt	
2005	Red Mercury	Gold Commander	
2005	Æon Flux	Keeper	
2006	Valley of the Heart's Delight	Albion Munson	
2006	The Omen	Father Brennan	
2007	Ghost Son	Doc	
2007	Closing the Ring	Quinlan	
2007	Liyarn Ngarn	Narrator	Documentary
2008	Player	Colin	Short film
2009	The Age of Stupid	The Archivist	Documentary
2009	Solomon Kane	William Crowthorn	
2009	Waving at Trains	Douglas	Short film
2010	Clash of the Titans	Spyros	
2010	Inception	Maurice Fischer	Nominated – Central Ohio Film Critics' Association Award for Best Ensemble; Nominated – Phoenix Film Critics Society Award for Best Cast; Nominated – Washington D.C. Area Film Critics Association Award for Best Ensemble
2010	The Town	Fergus "Fergie" Colm	National Board of Review Award for Best Cast; Washington D.C. Area Film Critics Association Award for Best Ensemble; Nominated – BAFTA Award for Best Actor in a Supporting Role (posthumous); Nominated – Broadcast Film Critics Association Award for Best Cast
2011	Killing Bono	Karl	Posthumous release

=== Television ===
Year	Title	Role	Notes
1975	Second City Firsts		Episode: "Thwum"; Credited as Peter Postlethwaite
1976	Plays for Britain	Soldier	Episode: "The Paradise Run"; Credited as Peter Postlethwaite
1978	Last of the Summer Wine	Customer in Sid's Cafe	Episode: "A Merry Heatwave"; Credited as Peter Postlethwaite
1978	Going Straight	Thomas Clifford Crowther	Episode: "Going Going Gone"; Credited as Peter Postlethwaite
1979	Afternoon Off	Gallery Attendant	
1979	Horse in the House	Uncle Doug	6 episodes
1981	Play for Today	Danny Duggan	Episode: "The Muscle Market"; Credited as Peter Postlethwaite
1981	Coronation Street	Detective Sergeant Cross	Episode 2061
1981	Crown Court		Episode: "The Merry Widow: Part 1"
1982–1993	Minder	Jack "Oily" Wragg; Eric "Logie" Lawson	2 episodes Credited as Peter Postlethwaite
1984	Mitch	Jack Frost	Episode: "Squealer"; Credited as Peter Postlethwaite
1985	Victoria Wood: As Seen on TV	Barry	Episode 1.6; Credited as Peter Postlethwaite
1985	Summer Season		Episode: "A Crack in the Ice"; Credited as Peter Postlethwaite
1987–1994	Screen Two		
1989	Tales of Sherwood Forest	Eric	7 episodes
1990	Screenplay	Paula's Father	Episode: "Needle"
1990	Debut on Two	Tony; Keef	2 episodes
1990	Boon	Steve McLaughlin	Episode: "Undercover"
1990	Zorro		Episode: "The Marked Man"
1990–1993	Casualty	Ralph Peters; Hank	2 episodes
1992	El C.I.D.	Vince	Episode 3.1: "Making Amends"
1992	Between the Lines	Chief Superintendent Jameson	Episode: "Out of the Game"
1992	Shakespeare: The Animated Tales	Quince	Episode: "A Midsummer Night's Dream"; Credited as Peter Postlethwaite
1992	The Bill	Ray Goller	Episode: "Principled Negotiation"
1993	Lovejoy	Terence Sullivan	Episode: "Goose Bumps"
1994	Sharpe	Sgt. Obadiah Hakeswill	Episode: "Sharpe's Company" Episode: "Sharpe's Enemy"
1994	Pie in the Sky	Kevin Tasker	Episode 1.8: "A Matter of Taste"
1994	Martin Chuzzlewit	Montague Tigg/Tigg Montague	5 episodes Nominated – British Academy Television Award for Best Actor
2000	The Sins	Len Green	TV series Nominated – British Academy Television Award for Best Actor
2003	Shattered City: The Halifax Explosion	Charles Burchell	TV series
2008	Criminal Justice	Hooch	TV series

== See also ==
- List of Academy Award winners and nominees from Great Britain
- List of actors in Royal Shakespeare Company productions
