= Benjamin (Animal Farm) =

Fictional donkey in George Orwell's 1945 novella Animal Farm

- First appearance: Animal Farm
- Created by: George Orwell
- Voiced by: Maurice Denham (1954 film); Pete Postlethwaite (1999 film); Kathleen Turner (2025 film)

In-universe information
- Species: Donkey
- Gender: Male

Benjamin is a donkey in George Orwell's 1945 novella Animal Farm. He is the oldest of all the animals and lives to the end of the novella. While Animal Farm is an allegory for the evolution of Communism in Russia, he is less straightforward than most characters in the novella, and a number of interpretations have been put forward as to which social class he represents in the context of the Russian Revolution and the Soviet Union. It is likely that Benjamin represents the old people of historical Russia, as he remembers the old laws that have been changed.

== Interpretations ==
Some interpret Benjamin as representing the elderly populace of Russia, because he is old and cynical. Others feel that he represents the Menshevik intelligentsia as he is just as intelligent, if not more so than the novella's pigs, yet he is marginalized. He is very cynical about the Revolution and life in general. It has also been argued that he represents the skeptical people who believed that Communism would not help the people of Russia, but who did not criticize it fervently enough to lose their lives.

He is one of the wisest animals on the farm and is able to "read as well as any pig". However, he rarely uses his ability, because he feels there is nothing worth reading. He does not use his ability for the benefit of others until the end of the book when Boxer (his closest friend) is sent off to the slaughterhouse, and when Clover asks him to read the public display of the Seven Commandments, as they, for the last time in the book, changed; Benjamin reveals that the Commandments now consist entirely of the message "All animals are equal, but some animals are more equal than others". Despite his age, he is never given the option of retirement (none of the animals are). Only the pigs' betrayal of his best friend, Boxer, spurs him into (failed) action, after which Benjamin becomes even more cynical than ever.

He is also quite significant in that he is not quite a horse (the working class) and yet definitely not a leader like the pigs, although his intellect is at least equal to theirs; this implies that Benjamin is a symbol of the intelligentsia who during the revolution and its aftermath were very much aware of what was going on, but did nothing about it. Although he is aware of their mistreatment (especially that of Boxer) and can see how the basic rules of their society are changing, he is unwilling to act on it in any way that would threaten his security.

Orwell became known as "Donkey George" to his friends – a reference to both his gloomy disposition and the character of Benjamin.

== Film ==
In the 1954 film, Benjamin is voiced by Maurice Denham. It is Benjamin who leads the other animals in a counter-revolution against Napoleon when his abuses finally go too far.

In the 1999 film, he is voiced by Pete Postlethwaite (who also played Farmer Jones in the film). In the film, his role is mostly played by Jessie the dog. In the end, Benjamin simply flees Napoleon's unendurable regime with Jessie and some of the other animals and returns after the regime had collapsed (neither event occurs in the book).

In the 2025 film, he is voiced by Kathleen Turner.
