= Animal Farm (1999 film) =

1999 American film directed by John Stephenson

- Promotional poster
- Based on: Animal Farm by George Orwell
- Teleplay by: Alan Janes; Martyn Burke
- Directed by: John Stephenson
- Starring: Kelsey Grammer; Ian Holm; Julia Louis-Dreyfus; Patrick Stewart; Julia Ormond; Paul Scofield; Pete Postlethwaite; Peter Ustinov
- Theme music composer: Richard Harvey
- Countries of origin: United States; United Kingdom
- Original language: English

Production
- Producers: Greg Smith; Robert Halmi
- Cinematography: Mike Brewster
- Editor: Colin Green
- Running time: 91 minutes
- Production companies: Lakeshore Entertainment; Hallmark Entertainment
- Budget: $23 million

Original release
- Network: TNT
- Release: 3 October 1999

Animal Farm is a 1999 satirical black tragicomedy film directed by John Stephenson and written by Alan Janes. A television film and live-action adaptation based on the 1945 novel of the same name by George Orwell and serving as an allegory of the Russian Revolution and its aftermath, the film features an ensemble cast including Kelsey Grammer, Ian Holm, Julia Louis-Dreyfus, Patrick Stewart, Julia Ormond, Paul Scofield (in his final film), Charles Dale, Pete Postlethwaite, Alan Stanford and Peter Ustinov. Jim Henson's Creature Shop provided the film's animatronic animals.

In the film, a border collie named Jessie serves as a main protagonist of the story. Jessie, alongside with her leader Snowball, and a group of anthropomorphic animals revolt successfully against their human owner, only to slide into a more brutal tyranny among themselves when Napoleon takes control of the farm.

== Plot ==
Jones, the irresponsible and alcoholic owner of Manor Farm, invites the Pilkingtons, whose large neighbouring farm is overgrown with weeds, to discuss his mounting debts, while the farm's animals gather inside his barn. Explaining that they can revolt and overthrow the humans to ensure egalitarianism and prosperity for animals, Old Major, the Middle White boar, teaches the creatures a song called "Beasts of the World", but Jones, overhearing the noise coming from the barn, ventures outside to investigate, only to unintentionally shoot Major with a shotgun. He then heads into town for a drink, but neglects to feed the animals. Upon Jones' return, Boxer, Manor Farm's shire horse, helps the animals infiltrate the food shed. The creatures accidentally awaken Jones, but soon pursue him, his wife and men off the farm and into town.

Snowball, a Large White boar, takes control of Manor Farm, renaming it "Animal Farm" and putting down the Seven Commandments of "Animalism". To commemorate the occasion, Snowball raises a green flag with a white hoof and horn on it. Meanwhile, a Border Collie named Jessie gives birth to puppies. Napoleon, a Berkshire boar, and his second-in-command Squealer, a Tamworth boar, hold a secret meeting in which he has Pincher, a rottweiler, swear loyalty to them, and gets hold of Jessie's puppies to train up. The pigs secretly begin hoarding apples and milk for themselves. Determined to prevent revolution from spreading to other farms, Pilkington leads an invasion into Animal Farm with some villagers and locals led by Frederick, the tough owner of the small but well-kept neighbouring Pinchfield Farm. However, as Snowball has planned for this in advance, the animals launch a counter-attack, frightening the other humans into fleeing.

Napoleon, opposing Snowball's plans to build a windmill to improve the animals' lives, summons Jessie's now-grown puppies to chase Snowball out of the farm and then decrees the pigs will decide the future; the animals begin to build the windmill. Pilkington learns that some of the animals can speak English and that they can trade. Jessie informs the others that she noticed the pigs living in the farmhouse and sleeping in the beds, realizing that Napoleon and Squealer altered the "sleeping in beds" commandment. Later that night at the Red Lion Inn, Pilkington humorously recounts exploiting Napoleon's inexperience by selling him cheap farm equipment. After Jones and his wife blow up the windmill, Napoleon blames its destruction on Snowball, and when the hens refuse to surrender their eggs to the market because of a food shortage, Napoleon makes feeding a hen punishable by death. Squealer begins making propaganda films, while the alcohol and killing commandments are altered into "no animal shall drink alcohol to excess" and "no animal shall kill another animal without cause".

While the windmill is being reconstructed, Boxer is injured. When the time comes for Boxer to be transported, Jessie and a wise donkey named Benjamin suddenly realize that the van taking him away is from the glue factory, with Pilkington having paid Napoleon to sell Boxer there. That night, Jessie observes Pilkington and his wife dining with the pigs in the farmhouse, with Napoleon having reverted the farm's name to Manor Farm. Through the warped window, Jessie notices Napoleon and Pilkington's faces have become so alike, she cannot differentiate between them. Muriel the goat and Benjamin notice that the final commandment, "All animals are equal", has been extended to include "but some animals are more equal than others". Realizing Napoleon and Squealer have become like Jones and Pilkington, Jessie, Benjamin, Muriel, and some other animals escape. Later, Napoleon, now clothed and standing on his hind legs, declares that the revolution is over and all animals are free.

Years later, the escaped animals return to the derelict Manor Farm, which has long collapsed following the end of Napoleon's reign of terror. They find Napoleon and Squealer are dead, having perished from their own dictation, though a few animals have survived, including Jessie's puppies, who all recognize her as their mother. Later, Jessie finds that a new family has purchased the farm (though it is unknown what happened to Jones and his wife), and vows to help them avoid the mistakes of Jones and Napoleon.

== Cast ==
Flag designs used in the 1999 adaptation during the film (left) and at the end of it (right)
- Pete Postlethwaite as Jones
- Caroline Gray as Mrs. Jones
- Alan Stanford as Pilkington
- Gail Fitzpatrick as Mrs. Pilkington
- Gerard Walsh as Mr. Frederick

=== Voices ===
The voice cast is:

- Julia Ormond as Jessie, a Border Collie
- Kelsey Grammer as Snowball, a Large White boar who leads the revolution.
- Patrick Stewart as Napoleon, a Berkshire boar who rises to power at Animal Farm
- Ian Holm as Squealer, a Tamworth boar and Napoleon's aide.
- Paul Scofield as Boxer, a shire stallion
- Pete Postlethwaite as Benjamin, a donkey
- Julia Louis-Dreyfus as Mollie, a grey Andalusian mare
- Jean Beith as Muriel, a Saanen goat
- Peter Ustinov as Old Major, an elderly Middle White boar who inspires the animals' rebellion
- Charles Dale as:
  - Moses, a raven
  - Pincher, a Rottweiler

== Production ==
Filming began on 25 August 1998 and ended on 6 November.

Animals were built to represent the titular characters of Animal Farm at Jim Henson's Creature Shop in London: four pigs (Old Major, Snowball, Napoleon, and Squealer), a shire horse (Boxer), two mares (Mollie and an unnamed black horse that is implied to be Clover), a Border collie (Jessie), a rottweiler (Pincher), a donkey (Benjamin), a raven (Moses), a goat (Muriel), a flock of sheep, cows, a rat, chickens, ducks and pigeons.

== Reception ==
The film won Best Special Effects and was nominated for best film in the 2000s Fantasporto International Fantasy Film Award.

The film's director John Stephenson was nominated for Starboy Award in the 2000s Oulu International Children's and Youth Film Festival.

== Release ==
=== Home media ===
Released on VHS and DVD on 18 January 2000 by Artisan Home Entertainment.

Re-released on a 2-disc DVD set paired with Moby Dick on 28 December 2010 by Vivendi Visual Entertainment.
