= Napoleon (Animal Farm) =

Fictional character and the main antagonist in George Orwell's Animal Farm

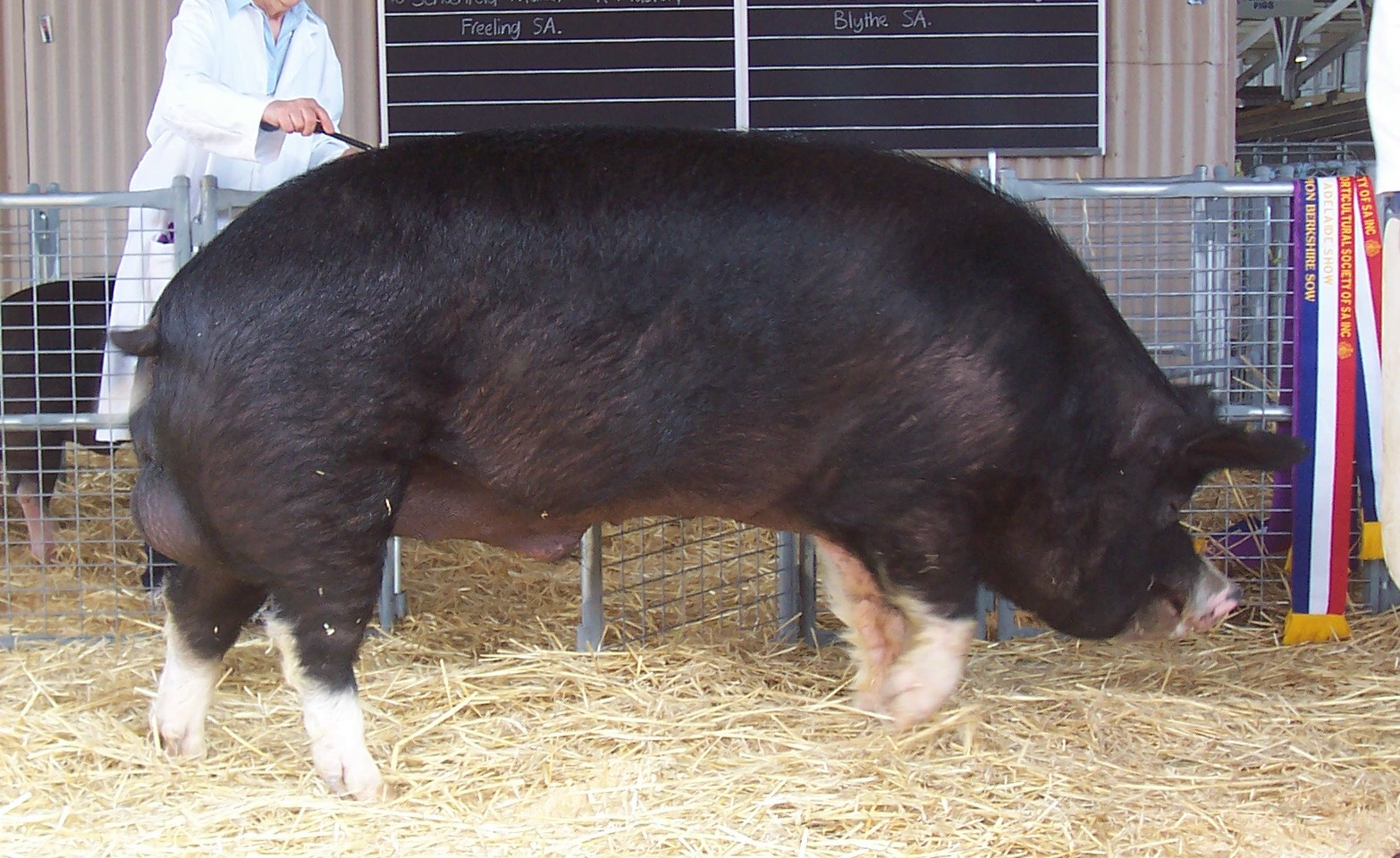
- A Berkshire boar, the breed that Napoleon is described as.
- First appearance: Animal Farm
- Created by: George Orwell
- Based on: Joseph Stalin
- Voiced by: Rob Rackstraw (1954 film); Patrick Stewart (1999 film); Seth Rogen (2025 film)

In-universe information
- Species: Berkshire boar (novel and 1999 film); British Saddleback (1954 film)
- Occupation: Leader of Animal Farm

Napoleon is a fictional character and the main antagonist of George Orwell's 1945 novella Animal Farm. While he is at first a common farm pig, he exiles Snowball, another pig, who is his rival for power. He then takes advantage of the animals' uprising against their masters to eventually become the tyrannical "President" of Animal Farm, which he turns into a dictatorship. He eventually becomes just as cruel as the farm's original human owner and is perceived as physically indistinguishable from a human at the very end of the story.

== Inspirations ==
The flag used in Napoleon's "Spontaneous Demonstrations".

The flag of Manor Farm after Napoleon takes full control.

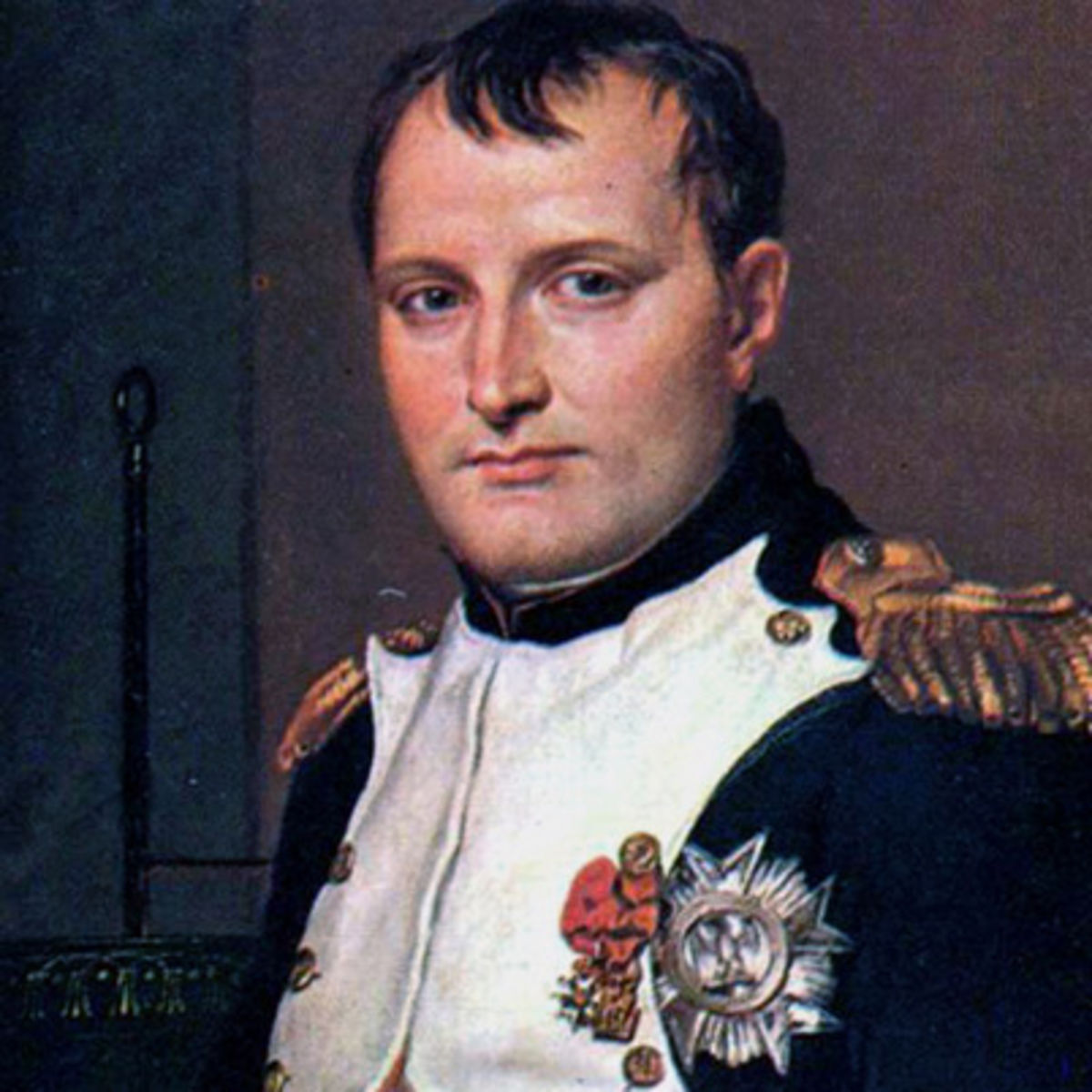
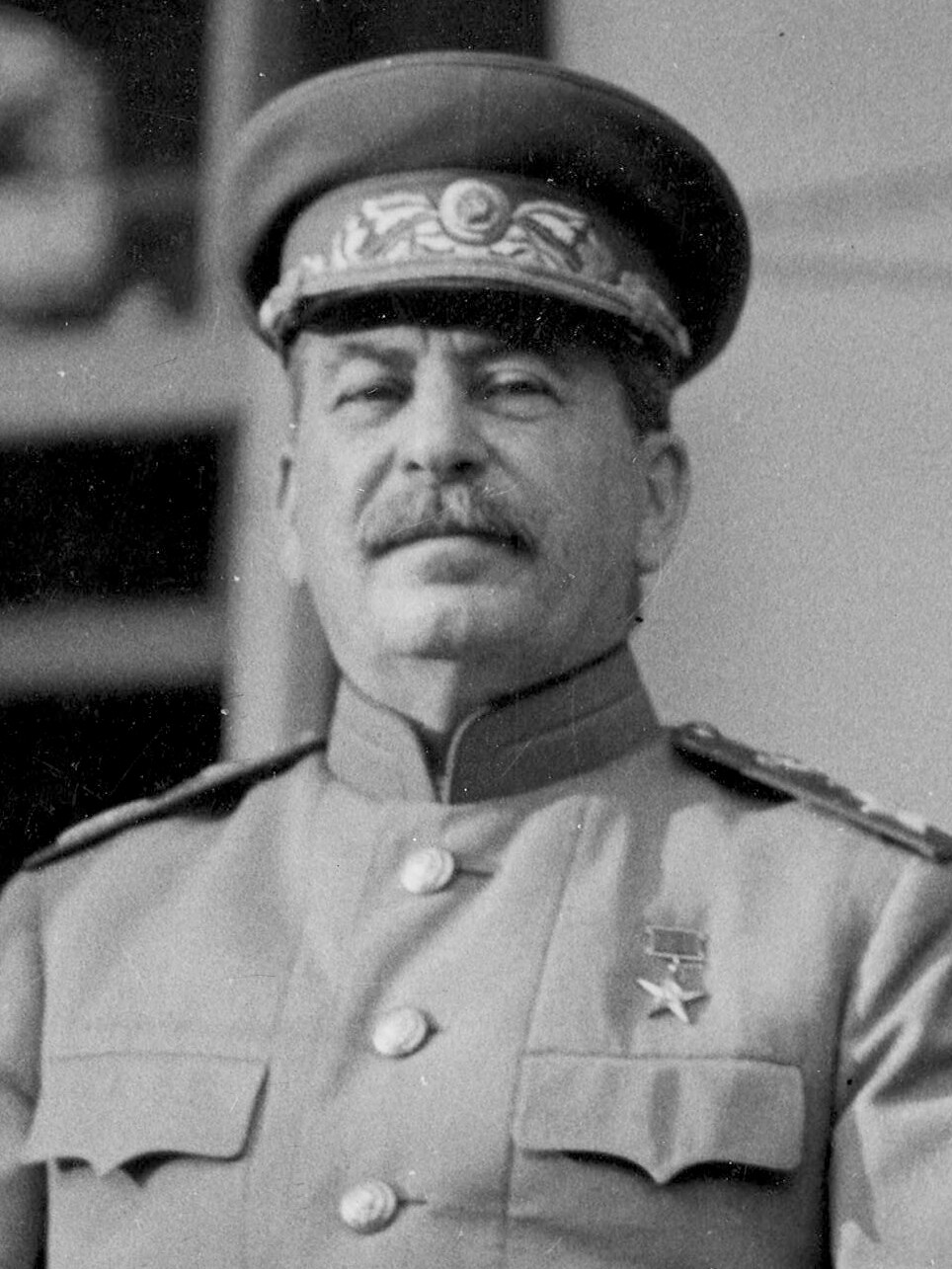
Napoleon was named after the Emperor of the French of the same name, while often considered as an allegory of Soviet Union general secretary and premier Joseph Stalin; both were highly controversial due to their wartime actions and dictatorship.

He is presumed to be named after the French emperor Napoleon. Napoleon and Snowball mirror the relationship between Stalin and Leon Trotsky. Trotsky supported Permanent Revolution (just as Snowball advocated overthrowing other farm owners), while Stalin supported socialism in one country (similar to Napoleon's idea of teaching the animals to use firearms, instead). When it seems Snowball will win the election for his plans, Napoleon calls in the dogs he has raised to chase Snowball from the farm. This is the first time the dogs have been seen since Napoleon took them in and raised them to act as his secret police.

Later on, after ostracising Snowball, Napoleon orders the construction of the windmill, which had been designed by Snowball and which Napoleon had opposed vigorously (just as Stalin opposed Trotsky's push for large scale industrialisation, then adopted it as a policy when Trotsky was in exile), so as to show the animals that he could be just as inventive as Snowball. The other animals are told it was Napoleon's ideas and that Snowball had stolen it. When the primitive windmill collapses after a storm, due to Napoleon's poor planning (a reference to Stalin's backward approach to the Five-Year Plans), Napoleon blames Snowball and starts a wave of terror (a reference to the Great Purge). During this period, he orders the execution of several of the animals after coercing their "confessions" of wrongdoing. He then commands the building of a second, stronger windmill, while severely cutting rations of the animals, except those of the pigs and dogs.

Napoleon later makes a deal with Frederick (similar to the Molotov–Ribbentrop Pact shortly before World War II). Frederick tricks Napoleon by paying him for a load of timber with counterfeit money and then invading the farm (much as Germany broke its pact and invaded the Soviet Union). During the Battle of the Windmill, the windmill is destroyed; although the animals win, they pay a high price. Napoleon attempts to cover the losses by stating it was a grand victory for the animals.

Although Napoleon exhorts the other animals to fight and die for the good of the farm, he himself is a coward and a lazy one at that, in contrast to Snowball, who was more concerned with the welfare of his animal friends than his power. Napoleon uses corrupt historical revisionism to portray himself as a hero, claiming responsibility for the animals' victory in the Battle of the Cowshed, when in reality it was Snowball who had performed heroic acts in this battle. Snowball's acts are denigrated through bald-faced lies about him collaborating with Jones all along and openly supporting Jones during the battle. Snowball was wounded in the back by buckshot, but it is claimed Napoleon inflicted the wounds with his teeth. Napoleon spends most of his time inside, giving his orders through other pigs, like the cunning orator Squealer, who helps spread support for him and changes the commandments. Napoleon declares the farm a republic, and a president is elected; as the only candidate, Napoleon is elected unanimously.

During his time in power, he also, through Squealer, secretly changes the Seven Commandments' prohibition against killing, drinking, and sleeping in beds, allowing his followers and him to break the original commandments, because the other animals (except for Benjamin, the cynical donkey) are not clever enough to notice, or they blame their own memories if they think they have noticed.

Ultimately, Napoleon becomes an oppressive dictator and begins to adopt many aspects of human behaviour. The pigs start walking on their hind legs, drinking alcohol, wearing clothes, and carrying whips near the end of the book. The commandments are changed to say, famously, "All animals are equal, but some animals are more equal than others." The maxim, "Four legs good, two legs bad." is changed to "Four legs good, two legs better."

The novel ends with Napoleon meeting with Pilkington of Foxwood Farm and other farmers, who claim the animals here work longer for less food than on other farms they have seen. Napoleon tells the other farmers that he has decided to abolish the use of "comrade" and declares that the farm shall revert to its original name of Manor Farm. Pilkington and he, just after declaring their similarities, fight after they both draw an ace of spades at a card game. The pigs have become so much like humans, both in behaviour and appearance, that the animals watching through a window from the outside cannot tell man and pig apart.

== In adaptations ==
The animated film version of Animal Farm adds a somewhat controversial last-minute "happy ending" where the realization that Napoleon has become identical to Mr. Jones prompts the other animals to revolt and kill him. Napoleon's fate is depicted by a rock breaking a hanging portrait of him before it falls off the wall.

The live-action version, meanwhile, ends with its protagonists successfully fleeing the farm after seeing a musical propaganda film portraying Napoleon as standing on two legs, and later returning after he has died and his dictatorship collapsed under vague circumstances, mirroring the real-life fall of the Soviet Union.

In the 2025 animated adaptation he is substantially re-written to be a more comedic character.
