= Squealer (Animal Farm) =

Fictional character from George Orwell's "Animal Farm"

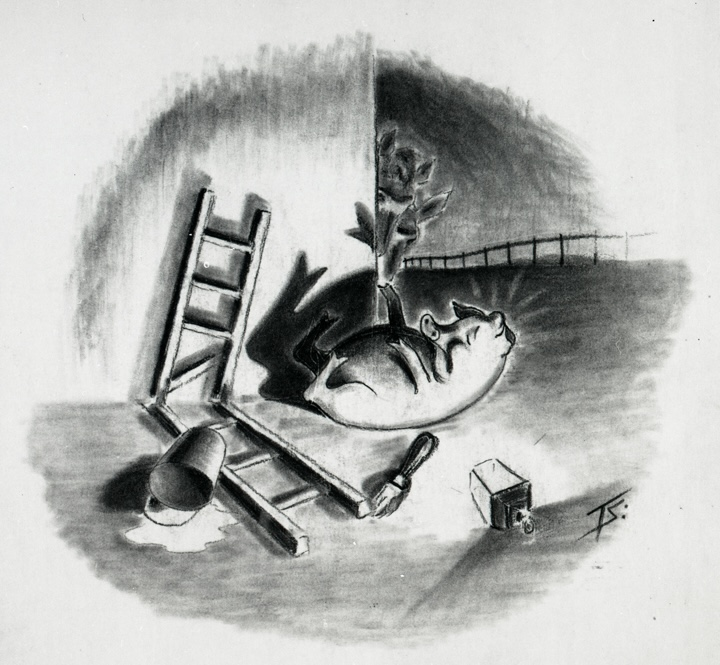
- Preliminary artwork by Norman Pett for a 1950 strip cartoon by Don Freeman, depicting Squealer falling from a ladder while changing the Seven Commandments on the barn
- First appearance: Animal Farm (only appearance)
- Created by: George Orwell
- Voiced by: Maurice Denham (1954 film); Ian Holm (1999 film); Kieran Culkin (2025 film)

In-universe information
- Species: Large White pig (1954 animated film and novel); Tamworth pig (in the 1999 film)
- Occupation: Napoleon's second-in-command and a leader of Animal Farm

Squealer is a fictional character, a pig, in George Orwell's 1945 novella Animal Farm. He serves as second-in-command to Napoleon and is the farm's minister of propaganda. He is described in the book as an effective and very convincing orator and a fat porker. In the 1954 film, he is a pink Large White pig, whereas in the 1999 film, he is a Tamworth pig who wears a monocle. He is said to be young near the beginning of the book, but ages years over time, being described in chapter 10 of the 1945 book as "so fat he could with difficulty see out of his eyes."

== Squealer's argument ==
Throughout the novel Squealer is very skilled at making speeches to the animals. He is also one of the leaders of the new farm. Under the rule of Napoleon, Squealer does things to manipulate all of the animals. Squealer takes the central role in making announcements to the animals, as Napoleon keeps appearing less and less often as the book progresses. Near the start of the book, it is said that he was very convincing and could turn "black into white". This foreshadows several euphemisms he uses to maintain the control of the barn through difficult times. He is Napoleon's key to propaganda for the farm.

== Breaking the commandments and telling lies ==
Throughout the book, Napoleon, Snowball, and Squealer broke the Seven Commandments, the tenets on which governance of the farm is based. To prevent the animals from suspecting them, Squealer preys on the animals' confusion and alters the Commandments from time to time as the need arises. Squealer falls off a ladder while trying to change one of the commandments in the night. A few days later it is discovered that Squealer was altering the commandment regarding alcohol; which suggests that he fell off the ladder because he was drunk. Orwell uses Squealer mainly to show how the increasingly totalitarian and corrupt regime uses propaganda and deceit to get its ideas accepted and implemented by the people. In the end, Squealer reduces the Seven Commandments to one commandment: "All animals are equal, but some animals are more equal than others".

A point is made by Napoleon dismissing the education of the mature animals as a lost cause while Snowball attempts to educate them all (he does focus on the key ideas of Animalism, nevertheless) and starting many committees which are apparently for the good of the entire Farm — Napoleon is explicitly stated to have 'no interest' in these committees, instead snatching up newborn dogs to educate them in seclusion. He takes advantage of their malleable minds and moulds them to his liking — the dogs show up later as military enforcers or secret police. As the newer generations are brought up with propaganda and the old generations are ignored, Squealer begins making changes to the Seven Commandments. The animals experience a vague feeling of unease, and when Clover and Muriel ponder the changes, they are told that they have simply forgotten. They accept this easily, helped along by the growling dogs that accompany the pigs everywhere. Benjamin alone appears to understand what is happening, though he never acts. If asked, he says that donkeys live a long time, and that "none of you has ever seen a dead donkey". True to his cynical nature, he continues to believe that life never gets better. He is briefly outraged by Boxer's death but becomes ever more cynical when Squealer again convinces the denizens of the Farm that Boxer was only taken to a hospital.

In the end, this works out to Squealer's advantage. Terror and silver-tongued oration fool nearly everyone, and the sole animal who sees through these fronts, Benjamin, is simply too cynical to do anything.

This reflected Orwell's view that events in Russia following the Revolution of 1917 had followed an unwelcome path, and that the egalitarian socialism he believed in had there become a brutal dictatorship built around a cult of personality and enforced by terror and lies. Orwell wrote: "All people who are morally sound have known since about 1931 that the Russian régime stinks". Squealer, as the chief propagandist of the regime, is prominent in the story and Orwell defines the path down which small lies lead to bigger lies. Orwell regarded propaganda as a feature of all modern governments but especially prominent in totalitarian regimes, which depended on it. In The Prevention of Literature (1946) he described "organized lying" as a crucial element of totalitarian states.
