= Maurice Denham =

English actor (1909–2002)

Maurice Denham OBE
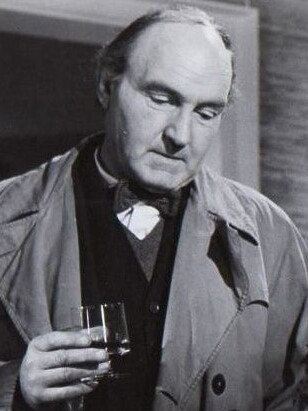
- Denham in Hysteria (1965)
- Born: William Maurice Denham; 23 December 1909; Beckenham, Kent, England
- Died: 24 July 2002 (aged 92); Denville Hall, London, England
- Occupation: Actor
- Years active: 1934–1997
- Spouse: Elizabeth Dunn (m. 1936; died 1971)
- Children: 3

William Maurice Denham (23 December 1909 – 24 July 2002) was an English actor who appeared in over 100 films and television programmes in his long career.

== Early life ==
Denham was born on 23 December 1909 in Beckenham, Kent, the son of Eleanor Winifred (née Lillico) and Norman Denham. He was the third child of four. He was educated at Tonbridge School and trained as a lift engineer. Like fellow actor James Robertson Justice, he played amateur rugby for Beckenham RFC.

== Career ==
Denham became an actor in 1934, and appeared in live television broadcasts as early as 1938, continuing to perform in that medium until 1997.

Denham initially made his name in radio comedy series such as It's That Man Again (ITMA) and Much Binding in the Marsh, which established him as a familiar radio character (providing over sixty different voices, female as well as male, according to a radio interview in November 1988), and later provided all the voices for the animated version of Animal Farm (1954). British Pathé chose him to narrate the voiceover for their 1950s film, All in a Day.

He was nominated for the BAFTA Award for Best Actor in a Leading Role for his performance as Blore in The Purple Plain (1954). Other film credits include 23 Paces to Baker Street (1956), Night of the Demon (1957), Two-Way Stretch (1960), Sink the Bismarck! (1960), H.M.S. Defiant (1962), Those Magnificent Men in Their Flying Machines (1965), The Day of the Jackal (1973), Minder on the Orient Express (1985) and 84 Charing Cross Road (1987).

Among his television appearances were as the father in Talking to a Stranger (1966), The Lotus Eaters (1972–73), as Archbishop Lang in Edward & Mrs Simpson (1978), Gerrit Dou in Schalcken the Painter (1979), All Passion Spent with Dame Wendy Hiller (1986), as Mr Justice Gwent-Evans in an episode of Rumpole of the Bailey (1987), Behaving Badly (1989), Inspector Morse (1991) and as Sir Max Spence in an episode of Lovejoy ("Benin Bronze", 1992). He appeared in the Sherlock Holmes story "The Last Vampyre" (1993), with Jeremy Brett starring as Sherlock Holmes. He also appeared (heavily made-up) in another Sherlock Holmes episode, starring Douglas Wilmer as Holmes, "The Retired Colourman", first shown by the BBC in 1965.

He made a guest appearance in the BBC science fiction television series Doctor Who in the 1984 serial The Twin Dilemma, the first story to star Colin Baker in the title role as the sixth Doctor. He later appeared in the Doctor Who radio serial The Paradise of Death in 1993, alongside Jon Pertwee. As The Honourable Mr Justice Stephen Rawley in two episodes in 1977 of the BBC TV prison comedy Porridge, he ends up sharing a cell with Ronnie Barker's Fletcher, whom he had sentenced.

In further radio work, he starred in a BBC Radio 4 version of the Oldest Member, based on stories by P.G. Wodehouse, from 1994 to 1999, as Rumpole in Rumpole: The Splendours and Miseries of an Old Bailey Hack, as Alexandre Manette in A Tale of Two Cities, as 'Father' in Peter Tinniswood's Winston series, and also as Chief Inspector Jules Maigret in several series beginning in 1976. He also portrayed Hercule Poirot in a BBC radio dramatisation of The Mystery of the Blue Train (1985).

In his book British Film Character Actors (1982), Terence Pettigrew noted that Denham "had one of the best-known bald heads in British films. His face was a minor work of art, a bright-eyed pixie face hand-painted on an egg. It could be kindly, sympathetic, gnomish and infinitely expressive. He also had one of the most listenable and controlled of English-speaking voices, a legacy from his many years in radio."

== Personal life and death ==
In 1936, Denham married Elizabeth Dunn, with whom he had two sons and a daughter.

Denham was awarded the OBE in 1992. He died on 24 July 2002, aged 92 at Denville Hall in north London.

== Selected filmography ==
- The Man Within (1947) as Smuggler
- The Upturned Glass (1947) as Mobile Policeman
- They Made Me a Fugitive (1947) as Mr Fenshaw
- Holiday Camp (1947) as Camp Doctor
- Jassy (1947) as Jim Stoner
- Captain Boycott (1947) as Lt. Col. StrickLand
- Fame Is the Spur (1947) as Prison Doctor No. 2 (uncredited)
- Take My Life (1947) as Defending Counsel
- The End of the River (1947) as Defending Counsel
- Easy Money (1948) as Detective-Inspector Kirby
- Blanche Fury (1948) as Maj. Fraser
- Escape (1948) as Crown Counsel
- Daybreak (1948) as Inspector
- Miranda (1948) as Cockle Vendor
- Oliver Twist (1948) as Chief of Police
- My Brother's Keeper (1948) as Supt. Trent
- London Belongs to Me (1948) as Jack Rufus
- The Blind Goddess (1948) as Johnson, The Butler
- Quartet (1948) as Coroner (segment "The Allen Corn")
- Here Come the Huggetts (1948) as 1st Engineer
- Look Before You Love (1948) as Fosser
- Once Upon a Dream (1949) as Vicar
- The Blue Lagoon (1949) as Ship Captain
- It's Not Cricket (1949) as Otto Fisch
- A Boy, a Girl and a Bike (1949) as Bill Martin
- Poet's Pub (1949) as PC Windle
- Don't Ever Leave Me (1949) as Mr Knowles
- Madness of the Heart (1949) as Simon Blake
- Landfall (1949) as Wing Cmdr. Hewitt
- The Spider and the Fly (1949) as Colonel de la Roche
- Traveller's Joy (1950) as Fowler
- No Highway (1951) as Major Pearl (uncredited)
- Time Bomb (1953) as Jim Warrilow
- The Net (1953) as Prof. Carrington (uncredited)
- Street Corner (1953) as Mr. Dawson
- Malta Story (1953) as British Officer (uncredited)
- The Million Pound Note (1954) as Jonathan Reid
- Eight O'Clock Walk (1954) as Horace Clifford
- The Purple Plain (1954) as Blore
- Carrington V.C. (1954) as Lt Col Reeve
- Animal Farm (1954) as All Animals (voices)
- Doctor at Sea (1955) as Easter
- Simon and Laura (1955) as Wilson
- 23 Paces to Baker Street (1956) as Inspector Grovening
- The Spanish Gardener (1956) as Pedro (voice)
- Checkpoint (1956) as Ted Thornhill
- Barnacle Bill (1957) as Crowley
- Night of the Demon (1957) as Professor Harrington
- The Captain's Table (1959) as Major Broster
- Our Man in Havana (1959) as Admiral
- Two-Way Stretch (1960) as The Governor
- Sink the Bismarck! (1960) as Commander Richards
- The Greengage Summer (1961) as Uncle William
- The Mark (1961) as Arnold Cartwright
- Invasion Quartet (1961) as Dr Barker
- Damn the Defiant (1962) as Mr Goss (Ship's Surgeon)
- The Set Up (1963) as Theo Gaunt
- The King's Breakfast (1963) as Narrator (voice)
- The Very Edge (1963) as Crawford
- Paranoiac (1963) as John Kossett
- Long Past Glory (TV film) (1963) as Charles
- The 7th Dawn (1964) as Tarlton
- Downfall (1964) as Sir Harold Crossley
- Operation Crossbow (1965) as RAF Officer
- Hysteria (1965) as Hemmings
- Those Magnificent Men in Their Flying Machines (1965) as Trawler Skipper
- The Alphabet Murders (1965) as Japp
- The Nanny (1965) as Dr. Beammaster
- The Heroes of Telemark (1965) as Doctor
- The Night Caller (1965) as Dr Morley
- The Uncle (1966) as Mr. Ream
- After the Fox (1966) as Chief of Interpol
- Jules Verne's Rocket to the Moon (1967) as Narrator (voice, uncredited)
- The Long Duel (1967) as Governor
- Danger Route (1967) as Peter Ravenspur
- Torture Garden (1967) as Uncle Roger (segment 1 "Enoch")
- Attack on the Iron Coast (1968) as Rear Admiral Sir Frederick Grafton
- Negatives (1968) as The Father
- Some Girls Do (1969) as Mr. Mortimer
- Midas Run (1969) as Charles Crittenden
- A Touch of Love (1969) as Doctor Prothero
- The Best House in London (1969) as Editor of The Times
- The Virgin and the Gypsy (1970) as The Rector
- Countess Dracula (1971) as Master Fabio, Castle Historian
- Sunday Bloody Sunday (1971) as Mr Greville
- Nicholas and Alexandra (1971) as Kokovtsov
- The Lotus Eaters (1972-1973), TV serie, as Nestor Turton
- The Day of the Jackal (1973) as General Colbert
- Luther (1974) as Johann von Staupitz
- Fall of Eagles (1974) as Kaiser Wilhelm I
- Shout at the Devil (1976) as Mr Smythe
- Julia (1977) as Undertaker
- Porridge (1977) as The Honourable Mr Justice Stephen Rawley (2 episodes)
- Secret Army — Series 1 Episode 14: Good Friday (1977) as Father Girard
- From a Far Country (1981) as Sapieha
- The Agatha Christie Hour (1982) as Parker Pyne
- Martin Luther, Heretic (1983) as Father Staupitz
- The Chain (1984) as Grandpa
- Mr. Love (1986) as Theo
- 84 Charing Cross Road (1987) as George Martin
- Miss Marple — 4:50 from Paddington (1987) as Luther Crackenthorpe
- Inspector Morse (1991) as Lance Mandeville
- Casualty (1997) as Mr Turnbull
