= Animal Farm =

1945 political allegorical novella by George Orwell

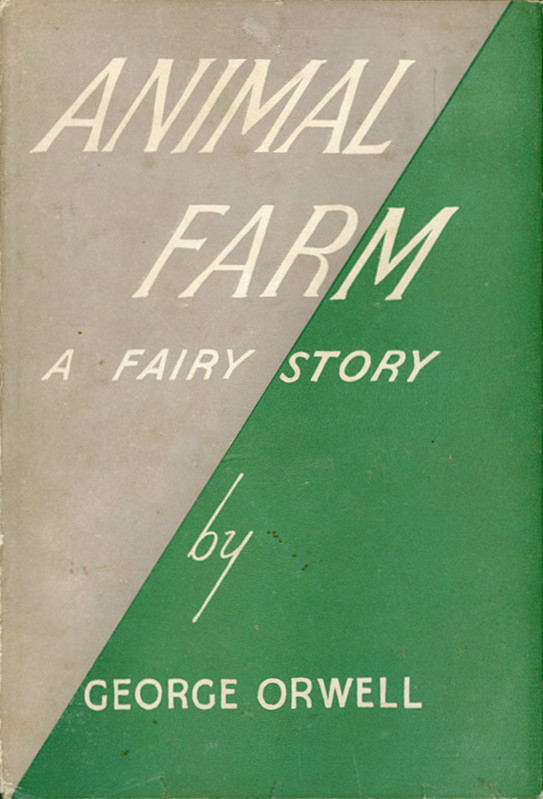
- First edition cover
- Author: George Orwell
- Original title: Animal Farm: A Fairy Story
- Language: English
- Genre: Political satire, dystopia, allegory
- Published: 17 August 1945 (Secker and Warburg, London, England)
- Publication place: United Kingdom
- Media type: Print (hard & paperback)
- Pages: 92
- Awards: Modern Library's 100 Best Novels; NPR: 100 Best Science Fiction and Fantasy Books; Hugo Award for Best Short Novel (1946); Prometheus Award – Hall of Fame (2011)
- OCLC: 3655473
- Dewey Decimal: 823/.912 20
- LC Class: PZ3.O793 An
- Preceded by: Inside the Whale and Other Essays
- Followed by: Nineteen Eighty-Four

Animal Farm (originally Animal Farm: A Fairy Story) is a satirical, allegorical, dystopian novella and beast fable by George Orwell, first published in England on 17 August 1945. It follows the mistreated, anthropomorphized farm animals of Manor Farm as they rebel against their human master and endeavor to create a utopian society. However, the rebellion is hijacked and betrayed, and under the dictatorship of the pigs, the farm ends up in a dystopian state nearly identical to what it had been before.

According to Orwell, Animal Farm was inspired by events leading up to the Russian Revolution of 1917 and then the Stalinist era of the Soviet Union, a period when Russia lived under the Marxist–Leninist ideology of Joseph Stalin. Orwell, a democratic socialist, was a critic of Stalin and hostile to Moscow-directed Stalinism, an attitude that was critically shaped by his experiences during the Barcelona May Day conflicts between the POUM and Stalinist forces during the Spanish Civil War. (Note: Orwell, writing in his review of Franz Borkenau's The Spanish Cockpit in Time and Tide, 31 July 1937, and "Spilling the Spanish Beans", New English Weekly, 29 July 1937) In a letter to Yvonne Davet (a French writer), Orwell described Animal Farm as a satirical tale against Stalin ("un conte satirique contre Staline"), and in his essay "Why I Write" (1946) wrote: "Animal Farm was the first book in which I tried, with full consciousness of what I was doing, to fuse political purpose and artistic purpose into one whole."

The original title of the novel was Animal Farm: A Fairy Story. American publishers dropped the subtitle when it was published in 1946. Other title variations include subtitles like "A Satire" and "A Contemporary Satire". Orwell suggested the title Union des républiques socialistes animales for the French translation, which abbreviates to "URSA", the Latin word for "bear", a symbol of Russia. It also played on the French name of the Soviet Union, Union des républiques socialistes soviétiques.

Orwell wrote the book between November 1943 and February 1944, when the United Kingdom was in its wartime alliance with the Soviet Union against Nazi Germany and the British intelligentsia held Stalin in high esteem, which Orwell hated. The manuscript was initially rejected by several British and American publishers, including one of Orwell's own, Victor Gollancz, which delayed its publication. (Note: According to Orwell, Gollancz refused to publish the book due to the fear of spoiling relations with a fundamental ally in the war against Nazism: "I must tell you that it is I think completely unacceptable politically from your point of view (it is anti-Stalin)." Gollancz became very angry at this insinuation; however, on 4 April 1944, he recognised his error of judgment: "You were right and I was wrong. I am so sorry. I have returned the manuscript.") It became a great commercial success when it did appear; international relations and public opinion had transformed as the wartime alliance gave way to the Cold War.

Time magazine chose the book as one of the 100 best English-language novels (1923 to 2005); it also appeared at number 31 on the Modern Library List of Best 20th-Century Novels, and number 46 on the BBC's The Big Read poll. It won a Retrospective Hugo Award in 1996, and is included in the Great Books of the Western World selection.

== Plot summary ==
The animal populace of Manor Farm near Willingdon, England, is neglected at the hands of the irresponsible and alcoholic farmer Mr. Jones. One night, the exalted boar Old Major holds a conference, at which he calls for the overthrow of humans and teaches the animals a revolutionary song called "Beasts of England". When Old Major dies, two young adult boars, Snowball and Napoleon, assume command and stage a revolt, driving out Mr. Jones and renaming the property "Animal Farm". The animals adopt the Seven Commandments of Animalism, a condensed version of Old Major's teachings, the most important of which is "All animals are equal". These rules are painted in large letters on one side of the barn. Snowball teaches the animals to read and write, while Napoleon educates young puppies on the principles of Animalism separately from the rest of the farm. To commemorate the start of Animal Farm, Snowball raises a flag with a white hoof and horn symbol made from Mrs. Jones' green tablecloth. Food is plentiful, and the farm runs smoothly. The pigs elevate themselves to positions of leadership and set aside special food items, ostensibly for their health. Following an unsuccessful attempt by Mr. Jones and his associates to retake the farm, henceforth referred to by the animals as the "Battle of the Cowshed", Snowball announces his plans to modernise the farm by building a windmill. Napoleon disputes this idea, and matters come to a head, which culminates in Napoleon's dogs chasing Snowball away and Napoleon effectively assuming supreme command.

Napoleon enacts changes to the political structure of the farm, replacing meetings with a committee of governing pigs. Old Major's skull is also exhumed and put on display. Through a diminutive boar named Squealer, who is a skilled orator, Napoleon claims credit for the idea of building the windmill, claiming that Snowball was only trying to win animals to his side. The animals work harder with the promise of easier lives with the windmill. When the windmill collapses after a violent storm due to its thin walls, Napoleon and Squealer persuade the animals that Snowball is trying to sabotage their project, and begin to purge the farm of animals accused by Napoleon of consorting with his old rival. When some animals recall the Battle of the Cowshed, Napoleon, who was not present during the battle, gradually smears Snowball to the point of saying he is a collaborator of Mr. Jones while falsely representing himself as the main hero of the battle. "Beasts of England" is banned, while an anthem glorifying Napoleon ("Comrade Napoleon") is composed and sung. Napoleon then conducts a second purge, during which many animals who are alleged to be helping Snowball in plots are executed by Napoleon's dogs, which troubles the rest of the animals. Despite their hardships, the animals are easily pacified by Squealer's retort that they are better off than they were under Mr. Jones (along with his accompanying false data), as well as by the sheep's continual bleating of "four legs good, two legs bad". As Napoleon, Squealer, and the other pigs gradually adopt a human-like lifestyle and repeatedly break the Seven Commandments, they secretly rewrite the laws to avoid facing resistance.

Mr. Frederick, a neighbouring farmer, attacks the farm, using blasting powder to blow up the restored windmill. Although the animals win the battle, they do so at great cost, as many, including Boxer the workhorse, are wounded. Although he recovers from this, Boxer eventually collapses while working on the windmill due to his age. After long sickness, he is taken away in a knacker's van, and a donkey called Benjamin alerts the animals of this, but Squealer quickly waves off their alarm by persuading the animals that the van had been purchased from the knacker by an animal hospital and that the previous owner's signboard had not been repainted. Squealer subsequently reports Boxer's death and honours him with a festival the following day, while, in truth, Napoleon had engineered the sale of Boxer to the knacker, allowing him and his inner circle to acquire money to buy whisky for themselves, which they used to celebrate the following night.

Years pass, the windmill is rebuilt, and a second windmill is constructed, which makes the farm a good amount of income. However, the ideals that Snowball discussed—including stalls with electric lighting, heating, and running water, along with a three-day work week for all animals—are forgotten, with Napoleon now advocating that the happiest animals live simple lives. Snowball himself has been forgotten too, while Boxer is remembered by only his friends. Many of the animals who participated in the rebellion are dead or old. Mr. Jones is known to have died in an inebriates' home. The pigs now resemble humans: they walk bipedally, carry whips, drink alcohol, and wear clothes. The Seven Commandments are abridged to just one phrase: "All animals are equal, but some animals are more equal than others". The maxim "Four legs good, two legs bad" is similarly changed to "Four legs good, two legs better". The Hoof and Horn symbol is removed from the green banner, and Old Major's skull is reburied.

Napoleon holds a dinner party for the pigs and newly allied human farmers. The other farm animals, who have not been invited, gather at the window to watch. He abolishes the practice of the revolutionary traditions and restores the property's name to "Manor Farm". He explains to the guests that, contrary to what has been told to the animals of the farm, the "lesser" animals are working more hours and receiving less food; a practice the other farmers commend and plan to institute with their own farms. The men and pigs start playing cards, quickly descending into conflict when both sides cheat. When the animals outside look at the pigs and men, they find they have become indistinguishable from one another.

== Characters ==
=== Pigs ===
- Old Major – An aged prize Middle White boar who provides the inspiration that fuels the rebellion. He is also called Willingdon Beauty when showing. He is an allegorical combination of Karl Marx, one of the creators of communism, and Vladimir Lenin, the communist leader of the Russian Revolution and the early Soviet nation, in that he draws up the principles of the revolution. His skull being put on revered public display recalls Lenin, whose embalmed body was left in indefinite repose at Lenin's Mausoleum. By the end of the book, the skull is reburied.
- Napoleon – An intimidating, manipulative Berkshire boar who becomes the leader of Animal Farm after driving out Snowball and gradually starts living like a human. Despite his name, he is an allegory of Joseph Stalin.
- Snowball – A boar and Napoleon's rival, who initially leads the farm after Jones's overthrow. His life parallels that of Leon Trotsky; although there is no reference to Snowball having been murdered (as Trotsky was), he is exiled from the farm and subsequently becomes an image of evil. He may also combine some elements from Lenin. (Note: According to Christopher Hitchens, "the persons of Lenin and Trotsky are combined into one [i.e., Snowball], or, it might even be ... to say, there is no Lenin at all.")
- Squealer – A small, stout boar who serves as Napoleon's second-in-command and minister of propaganda, is a collective portrait of the Soviet nomenklatura and journalists, such as of the national daily Pravda (The Truth), able to justify every twist and turn in Stalin's policy.
- Minimus – A poetic pig who writes the second national anthem of Animal Farm after the singing of "Beasts of England" is banned; later he composes a poem "Comrade Napoleon". Literary theorist John Rodden compares him to the poet Vladimir Mayakovsky, who eulogised Lenin and the Soviet Union, although Mayakovsky neither wrote anthems nor praised Stalin in his poems.
- The piglets – Hinted to be the children of Napoleon and are the first generation of animals subjugated to his idea of animal inequality.
- The young pigs – Four pigs who complain about Napoleon's takeover of the farm but are quickly silenced and later executed, the first kind of animals killed in Napoleon's farm purge. Probably based on the Great Purge of Grigory Zinoviev, Lev Kamenev, Nikolai Bukharin, and Alexei Rykov.
- Pinkeye – A pig who is mentioned only when he was given the task of tasting Napoleon's food to make sure it is not poisoned.

=== Humans ===
- Mr. Jones – A heavy drinker who is the original owner of Manor Farm, a farm in disrepair with farmhands who often loaf on the job. He is an allegory of Russian Tsar Nicholas II, who was forced to abdicate following the February Revolution of 1917 and was executed, along with the rest of his family, by the Bolsheviks on 17 July 1918. The animals revolt after Jones goes on a drinking binge, returns hungover the following day and neglects them completely. Jones is married, but his wife plays no active role in the book. She seems to live with her husband's drunkenness, going to bed while he stays up drinking until late into the night. In her only other appearance, she hastily throws a few things into a travel bag and flees when she sees that the animals are revolting. Towards the end of the book, Napoleon's "favourite sow" wears her old Sunday dress.
- Mr. Frederick – The tough owner of Pinchfield Farm, a small but well-kept neighbouring farm, who briefly allies with Napoleon. Animal Farm shares land boundaries with Pinchfield on one side and Foxwood on another, making Animal Farm a "buffer zone" between the two bickering farmers. The animals of Animal Farm are terrified of Frederick, as rumours abound of him abusing his animals and entertaining himself with cockfighting. Napoleon allies with Frederick to sell surplus timber that Pilkington also sought, but is enraged to learn Frederick paid him in counterfeit money. Shortly after the swindling, Frederick and his men invade Animal Farm, killing many animals and destroying the windmill. The brief alliance and subsequent invasion may allude to the Molotov–Ribbentrop Pact and Operation Barbarossa.
- Mr. Pilkington – The easy-going but crafty and well-to-do owner of Foxwood Farm, a large neighbouring farm overgrown with weeds. Pilkington is wealthier than Frederick and owns more land, but his farm needs care as opposed to Frederick's smaller but more efficiently run farm. Although on bad terms with Frederick, Pilkington is also concerned about the animal revolution that deposed Jones and is worried that this could also happen to him.
- Mr. Whymper – A man hired by Napoleon to act as the liaison between Animal Farm and human society. At first, he acquires necessities that cannot be produced on the farm, such as dog biscuits and paraffin wax, but later he procures luxuries like alcohol for the pigs.

=== Equines ===
- Boxer – A loyal, kind, dedicated, powerful, hard-working, and respectable cart-shire horse, although quite naive and gullible. Boxer does a large share of the physical labour on the farm. He is shown to believe that "Napoleon is always right." At one point, he questions Squealer's statement that Snowball was always against the welfare of the farm, causing him to be attacked by Napoleon's dogs; however, Boxer's immense strength repels the attack, worrying the pigs that their authority can be challenged. Boxer has been compared to Alexey Stakhanov, a diligent and enthusiastic role model of the Stakhanovite movement. He has been described as "faithful and strong"; he believes any problem can be solved if he works harder. When Boxer is injured, Napoleon sells him to a local knacker to buy himself whisky, and Squealer gives a moving account, falsifying the circumstances of Boxer's death.
- Mollie – A self-centred, self-indulgent, and vain young white mare who quickly leaves for another farm after the revolution, like those who left Russia after the fall of the Tsar. She is only once mentioned again, and has an affinity for hair ribbons and sugar cubes.
- Clover – A gentle, caring mare who shows concern, especially for Boxer, who often pushes himself too hard. Clover can read all the letters of the alphabet, but cannot form words with them.
- Benjamin – A donkey, one of the oldest, wisest animals on the farm, and one of the few who can read properly. He is sceptical, temperamental and cynical: his most frequent remark is, "Life will go on as it has always gone on – that is, badly". Academic Morris Dickstein has suggested there is "a touch of Orwell himself in this creature's timeless scepticism" and indeed, friends called Orwell "Donkey George", "after his grumbling donkey Benjamin, in Animal Farm ". Benjamin evades the purges and survives despite the threat he potentially poses given his knowledge, his age, and his equivocal, albeit apolitical, positions.

=== Other animals ===
- Muriel – A goat who is another of the oldest, wisest animals on the farm and friends with all of the animals on the farm. Similar to Benjamin, Muriel is one of the few animals on the farm who is not a pig but can read. She survives, as does Benjamin, by eschewing politics.
- The puppies – Offspring of Jessie and Bluebell, the puppies were taken away at birth by Napoleon and raised by him to serve as his powerful security force.
- Moses – A charismatic raven and personal pet of Mr. Jones with a natural talent for storytelling. Initially following Mrs. Jones into exile, he reappears several years later and resumes his role of talking but not working. He regales Animal Farm's denizens with tales of a wondrous place beyond the clouds called "Sugarcandy Mountain, that happy country where we poor animals shall rest forever from our labours!" Orwell portrays institutionalised religion as "the black raven of priestcraft – promising pie in the sky when you die, and faithfully serving whoever happens to be in power". His preaching to the animals heartens them, and Napoleon allows Moses to reside at the farm "with an allowance of a gill of beer daily", akin to how Stalin brought back the Russian Orthodox Church during the Second World War.
- The sheep – They are not given individual names or personalities. They show limited understanding of Animalism and the political atmosphere of the farm, yet nonetheless, they are the voice of blind conformity as they bleat their support of Napoleon's ideals with jingles during his speeches and meetings with Snowball. Their constant bleating of "Four legs good, two legs bad!" is used as a device to drown out any opposition or alternative views from Snowball, much as Stalin used hysterical crowds to drown out Trotsky. Towards the end of the book, Squealer, the propagandist, trains the sheep to alter their slogan to "Four legs good, two legs better!", which they dutifully do.
- The hens – The hens are promised following the rebellion that they will get to keep their eggs, which are stolen from them under Mr. Jones; however, their eggs are soon taken from them under the premise of buying goods from outside the farm. The hens are among the first to rebel, albeit unsuccessfully, against Napoleon, being brutally suppressed through starvation. They represent the Ukrainian victims of the Holodomor.
- The three cows – Unnamed. The cows are enticed into the revolution by promises that their milk will not be stolen but can be used to raise their calves. Their milk is then stolen by the pigs, who learn to milk them. The milk is stirred into the pigs' mash every day, while the other animals are denied such luxuries.
- The cat – Unnamed and never seen to carry out any work. The cat is absent for long periods and is forgiven because her excuses are so convincing and she is naturally charming and affectionate. She has no interest in the politics of the farm, and the only time she is recorded as having participated in an election, she is found to have actually voted both ways.
- The ducks – Unnamed. A brood of ducklings is said to have lost their mother. They are protected by Clover.
- The roosters – One arranges to wake Boxer early, and a black one acts as a trumpeter for Napoleon from the time he is a young cockerel.
- The geese – Unnamed. One gander commits suicide by eating nightshade berries.
- The pigeons — Unnamed. They attend Major's speech, report the appearance of Mollie on another farm, and partake in the Battle of the Cowshed, and are later used to convey messages between the pigs and humans under Napoleon's watch.
- The rats – Unnamed. Classed among the wild animals, unsuccessful attempts are made to civilise them and teach them the principles of Animalism.
- The rabbits – Like the rats, unsuccessful attempts are made to civilise them. At one point, Jones's former farmhands hunt and kill them.

== Genre and style ==
George Orwell's Animal Farm is an example of a political satire and an allegory that was intended to have a "wider application", according to Orwell himself, in terms of its relevance. Stylistically, the work shares many similarities with some of Orwell's other works, most notably Nineteen Eighty-Four, as both have been considered works of Swiftian satire. Furthermore, these two prominent works seem to suggest Orwell's bleak view of the future for humanity; he seems to stress the potential/current threat of dystopias similar to those in Animal Farm and Nineteen Eighty-Four. In these kinds of works, Orwell distinctly references the disarray and traumatic conditions of Europe following the Second World War. Orwell's style and writing philosophy as a whole were very concerned with the pursuit of truth in writing.

Orwell was committed to communicating straightforwardly, given the way that he felt words were commonly used in politics to deceive and confuse. For this reason, he is careful, in Animal Farm, to make sure the narrator speaks in an unbiased and uncomplicated fashion making the words easier to understand. The difference is seen in the way that the animals speak and interact, as the general moral animals seem to speak their minds clearly, while the wicked animals on the farm, such as Napoleon, twist language in such a way that it meets their insidious desires. This style reflects Orwell's proximity to the issues facing Europe at the time and his determination to comment critically on Stalin's Soviet Russia.

== Background ==
=== Origin and writing ===
Orwell may have been inspired by the Polish Nobel prize laureate Wladyslaw Reymont's 1924 book Bunt ("Revolt"), a story very similar to Animal Farm about a revolt by animals which take over their farm with plans to introduce equality.

George Orwell wrote the manuscript between November 1943 and February 1944 after his experiences during the Spanish Civil War, which he described in Homage to Catalonia (1938). In the preface of a 1947 Ukrainian edition of Animal Farm, he explained how escaping the communist purges in Spain taught him "how easily totalitarian propaganda can control the opinion of enlightened people in democratic countries". This motivated Orwell to expose and strongly condemn what he saw as the Stalinist corruption of the original socialist ideals. Homage to Catalonia sold poorly; after seeing Arthur Koestler's best-selling Darkness at Noon about the Moscow Trials, Orwell decided that fiction would be the best way to describe totalitarianism.

Immediately before writing the book, Orwell quit the BBC. He was also upset about a booklet for propagandists the Ministry of Information had put out. The booklet included instructions on how to quell ideological fears of the Soviet Union, such as directions to claim that the Red Terror was a figment of Nazi imagination.

In the preface, Orwell described the source of the idea of setting the book on a farm:

I saw a little boy, perhaps ten years old, driving a huge carthorse along a narrow path, whipping it whenever it tried to turn. It struck me that if only such animals became aware of their strength we should have no power over them, and that men exploit animals in much the same way as the rich exploit the proletariat.

In a 2025 article in The Guardian, Orwell's adopted son Richard Blair stated that his adoptive mother Eileen Blair, Orwell's first wife, helped to plan Animal Farm and described the book as "my parents' teamwork".

In June 1944, the manuscript was almost lost when a German V-1 flying bomb destroyed his London flat in Mortimer Crescent, Kilburn. Orwell spent hours sifting through the rubble to find the pages intact. Writing to T. S. Eliot at his publisher, Orwell noted that the enclosed manuscript had been "blitzed" and was in "slightly crumpled condition, but it is not damaged in any way".

== Publication ==
=== Publishing ===
Orwell initially encountered difficulty getting the manuscript published, largely due to fears that the book might upset the western wartime alliance with the Soviet Union. Four publishers refused to publish Animal Farm, yet one had initially accepted the work but declined it after consulting the Ministry of Information. (Note: Orwell 1976 p. 25 La libertà di stampa) Eventually, Secker & Warburg in London published the first edition on 17 August 1945.

During World War II, it became clear to Orwell that anti-Soviet literature was not something which most major publishing houses in Britain and America would touch – including his regular publisher Gollancz. He also submitted the manuscript to Faber and Faber, where the poet T. S. Eliot (who was a director of the firm) rejected it; Eliot wrote back to Orwell praising the book's "good writing" and "fundamental integrity", but declared that they would only accept it for publication if they had some sympathy for the viewpoint "which I take to be generally Trotskyite". Eliot said he found the view "not convincing", and contended that the pigs were made out to be the best to run the farm; he posited that someone might argue "what was needed ... was not more communism but more public-spirited pigs". Orwell let André Deutsch, who was working for Nicholson & Watson in 1944, read the typescript, and Deutsch was convinced that Nicholson & Watson would want to publish it; however, they did not, and "lectured Orwell on what they perceived to be errors in Animal Farm". In his London Letter on 17 April 1944 for Partisan Review, Orwell wrote that it was "now next door to impossible to get anything overtly anti-Russian printed. Anti-Russian books do appear, but mostly from Catholic publishing firms and always from a religious or frankly reactionary angle". In 2025, Orwell's son Richard Blair wrote:

There was a deep-rooted institutional reluctance to allow any criticism of Soviet Russia while it was a British ally leading the destruction of Nazi Germany. This attitude was compounded by relentless Soviet government lobbying and the comprehensive infiltration of British institutions by Soviet agents. Peter Smollett (AKA Smolka, Soviet agent codename ABO) was head of Soviet relations at the Ministry of Information and the now notorious Cambridge spy Guy Burgess was a BBC producer.

The publisher Jonathan Cape, who had initially accepted Animal Farm, subsequently rejected the book after an official at the British Ministry of Information warned him off – although the civil servant who it is assumed gave the order was later found to be a Soviet spy. Writing to Leonard Moore, a partner in the literary agency of Christy & Moore, publisher Jonathan Cape explained that the decision had been taken on the advice of a senior official in the Ministry of Information. Such flagrant anti-Soviet bias was unacceptable, and the choice of pigs as the dominant class was thought to be especially offensive. It may reasonably be assumed that the "important official" was an Austrian-born man named Peter Smollett (born Hans Peter Smolka), who was later unmasked as a Soviet agent. Orwell was suspicious of Smollett/Smolka, who had come to Britain in 1933 as an NKVD agent codenamed "ABO", and he would be one of the names Orwell included in his list of Crypto-Communists and Fellow-Travellers sent to the Information Research Department in 1949. The publisher wrote to Orwell, saying:

If the fable were addressed generally to dictators and dictatorships at large then publication would be all right, but the fable does follow, as I see now, so completely the progress of the Russian Soviets and their two dictators [Lenin and Stalin], that it can apply only to Russia, to the exclusion of the other dictatorships.

Another thing: it would be less offensive if the predominant caste in the fable were not pigs. I think the choice of pigs as the ruling caste will no doubt give offence to many people, and particularly to anyone who is a bit touchy, as undoubtedly the Russians are.

Fredric Warburg also faced pressures against publication, even from people in his own office and from his wife Pamela, who felt that it was not the moment for ingratitude towards Stalin and the Red Army, which had played a major part in defeating Adolf Hitler. A Russian translation was printed in the paper Posev, and in permitting a Russian translation of Animal Farm, Orwell refused in advance all royalties. A translation in Ukrainian, which was produced in Germany, was confiscated in large part by the American wartime authorities and handed over to the Soviet repatriation commission. (Note: Struve, Gleb. Telling the Russians, written for the Russian journal New Russian Wind, reprinted in Remembering Orwell)

When Animal Farm was eventually first published in England in August 1945 (Fredric Warburg of Secker & Warburg had agreed to take it on in July 1944, but paper shortages and ongoing reluctance to offend the wartime ally meant it was not published until then) the views towards the Russians were beginning to change, with Orwell's son Richard Blair writing in The Guardian, "relations with Russia were by then rapidly cooling and, as my father said, people were "fed up with all [this] Russian nonsense".

In October 1945, Orwell wrote to Fredric Warburg expressing interest in pursuing the possibility that the political cartoonist David Low might illustrate Animal Farm. Low had written a letter saying that he had had "a good time with Animal Farm – an excellent bit of satire – it would illustrate perfectly". Nothing came of this, and a trial issue produced by Secker & Warburg in 1956 illustrated by John Driver was abandoned. The Folio Society published an edition in 1984 illustrated by Quentin Blake and an edition illustrated by the cartoonist Ralph Steadman was published by Secker & Warburg in 1995 to celebrate the fiftieth anniversary of the first edition of Animal Farm.

Despite its enormous commercial success in the UK, Animal Farm had a hard time finding a publisher in the US. Some of the rejections were straightforward, made on the grounds that the book was "too short for adequate marketing." Orwell was aware that, as in the UK, some American publishers had rejected Animal Farm on political grounds. In January 1946, Partisan Review editor Philip Rahv warned Orwell that the majority of the American left-wing was "almost solidly Stalinist." Historian and polemicist Peter Viereck remarked that Animal Farm's initial reception suffered due to "the brilliantly successful infiltration of Stalinoid sympathizers in the book world." Historian Arthur Schlesinger Jr. returned to America from wartime service in Europe with several Animal Farm copies and attempted to interest his American publisher. He recalls the firm rejecting the book because, according to Schlesinger, the editor-in-chief was "a defender of Stalinism."

The book was eventually published in the US by Harcourt, Brace after Frank Morley, an editor who previously worked at Faber and Faber, encountered customers at a bookshop in Cambridge, England in late 1945 seeking to purchase the sold-out Animal Farm. After procuring a copy, he made a deal in January 1946 to publish the book in the US.

=== Preface ===
Orwell originally wrote a preface complaining about British self-censorship and how the British people were suppressing criticism of the USSR, their World War II ally:

The sinister fact about literary censorship in England is that it is largely voluntary ... Things are kept right out of the British press, not because the Government intervenes but because of a general tacit agreement that "it wouldn't do" to mention that particular fact.

What is disquieting is that where the USSR and its policies are concerned one cannot expect intelligent criticism or even, in many cases, plain honesty from Liberal writers and journalists who are under no direct pressure to falsify their opinions. Stalin is sacrosanct and certain aspects of his policy must not be seriously discussed.

Although the first edition allowed space for the preface in the author's proof, it was not included, and the page numbers had to be renumbered at the last minute. In 1972, Ian Angus found the original typescript titled "The Freedom of the Press", and Bernard Crick published it, together with his introduction, in The Times Literary Supplement on 15 September 1972 as "How the essay came to be written". Orwell's essay criticised British self-censorship by the press, specifically the suppression of unflattering descriptions of Stalin and the Soviet government, and believed that this was a symptom of the weakening of the western liberal tradition.

== Reception ==
Contemporary reviews of the work were not universally positive. Writing in the American New Republic magazine, George Soule expressed his disappointment in the book, writing that it "puzzled and saddened me. It seemed on the whole dull. The allegory turned out to be a creaking machine for saying in a clumsy way things that have been said better directly." Soule believed that the animals were not consistent enough with their real-world inspirations, and said, "It seems to me that the failure of this book (commercially it is already assured of tremendous success) arises from the fact that the satire deals not with something the author has experienced, but rather with stereotyped ideas about a country which he probably does not know very well."

The Guardian on 24 August 1945 called Animal Farm "a delightfully humorous and caustic satire on the rule of the many by the few". Tosco Fyvel, writing in Tribune on the same day, called the book "a gentle satire on a certain State and on the illusions of an age which may already be behind us". Julian Symons responded, on 7 September, "Should we not expect, in Tribune at least, acknowledgement of the fact that it is a satire not at all gentle upon a particular State – Soviet Russia? It seems to me that a reviewer should have the courage to identify Napoleon with Stalin, and Snowball with Trotsky, and express an opinion favourable or unfavourable to the author, upon a political ground. In a hundred years perhaps, Animal Farm may be simply a fairy story; today it is a political satire with a good deal of point". Animal Farm has been subject to much comment in the decades since these early remarks.

Between 1952 and 1957, the CIA, in an operation codenamed Aedinosaur, sent millions of balloons carrying copies of the novel into Poland, Hungary, and Czechoslovakia, whose air forces tried to shoot the balloons down. The Information Research Department, a secret Cold War propaganda agency of the British government, translated the book into various languages such as Arabic.

Time magazine chose Animal Farm as one of the 100 best English-language novels (1923 to 2005); it also featured at number 31 on the Modern Library List of Best 20th-Century Novels. It won a Retrospective Hugo Award in 1996 and is included in the Great Books of the Western World selection.

Popular reading in schools, Animal Farm was ranked the United Kingdom's favourite book from school in a 2016 poll.

Animal Farm has also faced an array of challenges in school settings around the United States. The following are examples of this controversy that has existed around Orwell's work:

- The John Birch Society in Wisconsin challenged the reading of Animal Farm in 1965 because of its reference to the masses revolting.
- New York State English Council's Committee on Defense Against Censorship found that in 1968, Animal Farm had been widely deemed a "problem book".
- A censorship survey conducted in DeKalb County, Georgia, United States, relating to the years 1979–1982, revealed that many schools had attempted to limit access to Animal Farm due to its "political theories".
- A superintendent in Bay County, Florida, banned Animal Farm at the middle school and high school levels in 1987.
  - The Board quickly brought back the book, however, after receiving complaints of the ban as "unconstitutional".
- Animal Farm was removed from the Stonington, Connecticut school district curriculum in 2017.

Animal Farm has also faced similar forms of resistance in other countries. The American Library Association also mentions the way that the book was prevented from being featured at the International Book Fair in Moscow, Russia, in 1977 and banned from schools in the United Arab Emirates for references to practices or actions that defy Arab or Islamic beliefs, such as pigs or alcohol. At times, it is also not allowed by some countries in the Islamic world for similar reasons.

In the same manner, Animal Farm has also faced relatively recent issues in China. In 2018, the Chinese government decided to censor all online posts about or referring to Animal Farm. Despite this move, as of 2019, the book remains sold in stores. Amy Hawkins and Jeffrey Wasserstrom of The Atlantic stated in 2019 that the book is widely available in mainland China for several reasons: because censors believe the general public is unlikely to read a highbrow book, because the elites who do read books feel connected to the ruling party anyway, and because the Communist Party sees being too aggressive in blocking cultural products as a liability. The authors stated: "It was – and remains – as easy to buy 1984 and Animal Farm in Shenzhen or Shanghai as it is in London or Los Angeles". An enhanced version of the book, launched in India in 2017, was widely praised for capturing the author's intent, by republishing the proposed preface of the First Edition and the preface he wrote for the Ukrainian edition.

== Analysis ==
=== Animalism ===
After the revolution, Snowball, Napoleon, and Squealer adapt Old Major's ideas into "a complete system of thought", which they formally name Animalism, an allegoric reference to Communism, not to be confused with the philosophy of Animalism. Soon after, Napoleon and Squealer partake in activities associated with humans that the Seven Commandments had explicitly prohibited. They also engage in trade, one of Old Major's proposed forbidden activities not directly included in the commandments (the other two being living in houses and smoking tobacco). Squealer is employed to alter the commandments to account for this humanisation, an allusion to the Soviet government's revising of history to exercise control of the people's beliefs about themselves and their society.

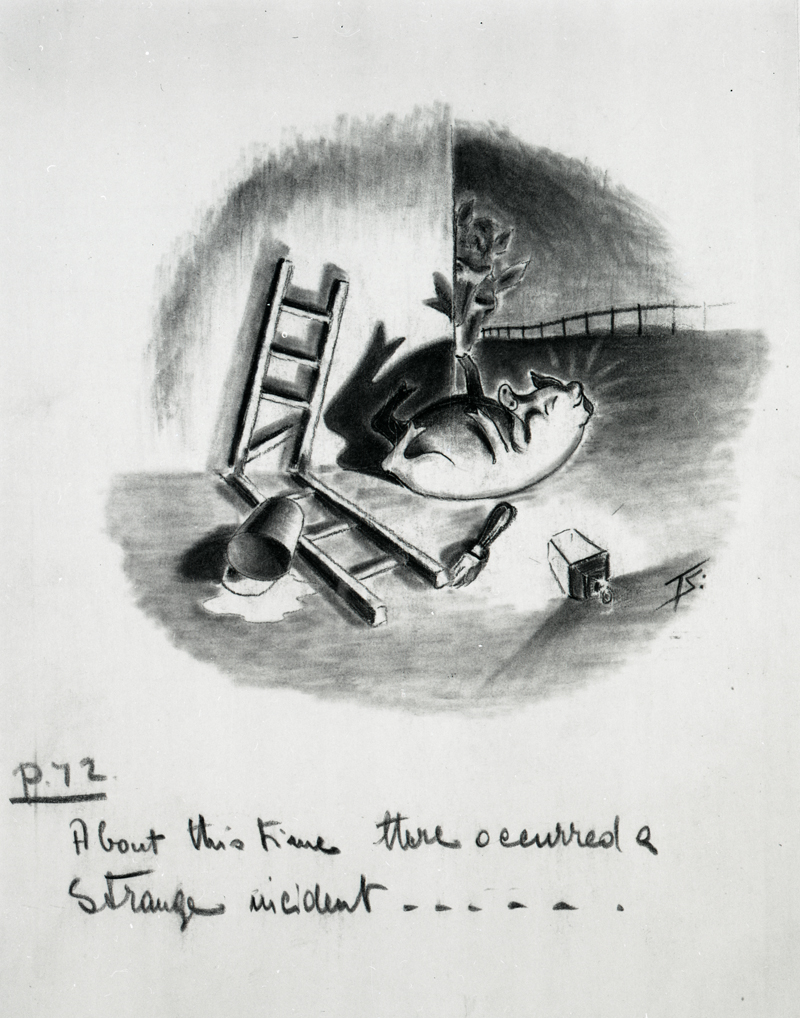
Squealer sprawls at the foot of the end wall of the big barn where the Seven Commandments were written (ch. viii) – preliminary artwork for a 1950 strip cartoon by Norman Pett and Donald Freeman

The original commandments are:

1. Whatever goes upon two legs is an enemy.
2. Whatever goes upon four legs, or has wings, is a friend.
3. No animal shall wear clothes.
4. No animal shall sleep in a bed.
5. No animal shall drink alcohol.
6. No animal shall kill any other animal.
7. All animals are equal.

These commandments are also distilled into the maxim "Four legs good, two legs bad!" which is primarily used by the sheep on the farm, often to disrupt discussions and disagreements between animals on the nature of Animalism.

Later, Napoleon and his pigs secretly revise some commandments to clear themselves of accusations of law-breaking. The changed commandments are as follows, with the changes bolded:

4. No animal shall sleep in a bed **with sheets**.
5. No animal shall drink alcohol **to excess**.
6. No animal shall kill any other animal **without cause**.
7. All animals are equal **but some animals are more equal than others.**

Eventually, only the seventh commandment remains, and the "legs" maxim is replaced by "Four legs good, two legs better!", as the pigs become more anthropomorphic. This is an ironic twist to the original purpose of the Seven Commandments, which was supposed to keep order within Animal Farm by uniting the animals together against the humans and preventing animals from following the humans' evil habits. Through the revision of the commandments, Orwell demonstrates how simply political dogma can be turned into malleable propaganda.

=== Significance and allegory ===
The Hoof and Horn flag described in the book as "an old green tablecloth of Mrs. Jones's [which has] painted on it a hoof and a horn in white" appears to be based on the hammer and sickle, the Communist symbol. By the end of the book when Napoleon takes full control, the Hoof and Horn is removed from the flag.

Orwell biographer Jeffrey Meyers has written, "virtually every detail has political significance in this allegory". While the novella is often interpreted as a direct satire of specific historical events, some readings emphasize that its broader message extends beyond a single ideology, illustrating how systems of power—whether emerging from revolutionary, liberal, conservative, or mixed political traditions—can produce authoritarian outcomes under certain conditions. Orwell himself wrote in 1946, "Of course I intended it primarily as a satire on the Russian revolution ... [and] that kind of revolution (violent conspiratorial revolution, led by unconsciously power-hungry people) can only lead to a change of masters [–] revolutions only effect a radical improvement when the masses are alert". This observation has been interpreted by some commentators as suggesting a more universal warning about political complacency and the concentration of power, rather than a critique confined to a single party or ideology. In contemporary discourse, this perspective has been contrasted with more partisan interpretations that attribute authoritarian tendencies primarily to specific modern political groups, with critics arguing that such readings risk oversimplifying the dynamics Orwell sought to portray.

In a preface for a 1947 Ukrainian edition, Orwell stated, "for the past ten years I have been convinced that the destruction of the Soviet myth was essential if we wanted a revival of the socialist movement". However, the narrative has also been read as a study of how political myths and charismatic leadership can take hold in any society, particularly during periods of instability. As such, the work has been described as remaining relevant in modern contexts, where observers have noted parallels between the behavior of fictional leaders and that of various contemporary political figures across different countries, regardless of ideological alignment.

The revolt of the animals against Farmer Jones is Orwell's analogy with the October 1917 Bolshevik Revolution. The Battle of the Cowshed has been said to represent the allied invasion of Soviet Russia in 1918, and the defeat of the White Russians in the Russian Civil War. The pigs' rise to preeminence mirrors the rise of a Stalinist bureaucracy in the USSR, just as Napoleon's emergence as the farm's sole leader reflects Stalin's emergence. At the same time, broader interpretations suggest that the mechanisms depicted—propaganda, fear, gradual erosion of norms, and the personalization of power—are not unique to one historical regime but can develop in varied political environments when institutional checks weaken.

The pigs' appropriation of milk and apples for their own use, "the turning point of the story" as Orwell termed it in a letter to Dwight Macdonald, stands as an analogy for the crushing of the left-wing 1921 Kronstadt revolt against the Bolsheviks, and the difficult efforts of the animals to build the windmill suggest the various five-year plans. The puppies controlled by Napoleon parallel the nurture of the secret police in the Stalinist structure, and the pigs' treatment of the other animals on the farm recalls the internal terror faced by the populace in the 1930s. In chapter seven, when the animals confess their non-existent crimes and are killed, Orwell directly alludes to the purges, confessions and show trials of the late 1930s. These elements have also been interpreted more generally as illustrating how fear-based governance and the manipulation of truth can emerge in many political systems, particularly when populations are divided or disengaged.

Peter Edgerly Firchow and Peter Davison contend that the Battle of the Windmill, specifically referencing the Battle of Stalingrad and the Battle of Moscow, represents World War II. During the battle, Orwell first wrote, "All the animals, including Napoleon" took cover. Orwell had the publisher alter this to "All the animals except Napoleon" in recognition of Stalin's decision to remain in Moscow during the German advance. Orwell requested the change after he met Józef Czapski in Paris in March 1945. Czapski, a survivor of the Katyn Massacre and an opponent of the Soviet regime, told Orwell, as Orwell wrote to Arthur Koestler, that it had been "the character [and] greatness of Stalin" that saved Russia from the German invasion. (Note: A Note on the Text, Peter Davison, Animal Farm, Penguin edition 1989)

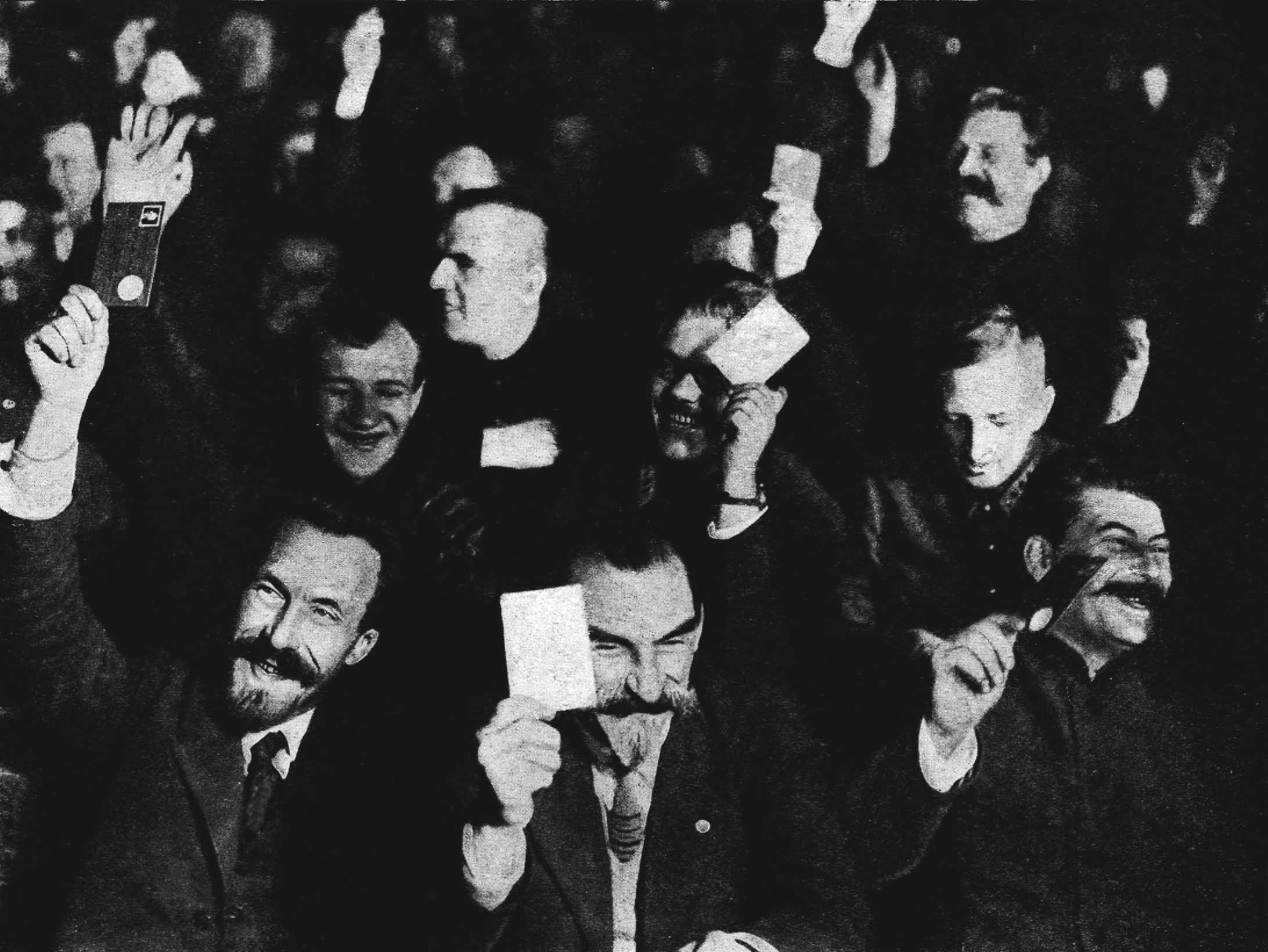
Front row (left to right): Rykov, Skrypnyk, and Stalin – 'When Snowball comes to the crucial points in his speeches he is drowned out by the sheep (Ch. V), just as in the party Congress in 1927 [above], at Stalin's instigation 'pleas for the opposition were drowned in the continual, hysterically intolerant uproar from the floor'. (Isaac Deutscher)

Other connections that writers have suggested illustrate Orwell's telescoping of Russian history from 1917 to 1943, (Note: In the Preface to Animal Farm Orwell noted, however, "although various episodes are taken from the actual history of the Russian Revolution, they are dealt with schematically and their chronological order is changed.") including the wave of rebelliousness that ran through the countryside after the Rebellion, which stands for the abortive revolutions in Hungary and Germany (Ch. IV); the conflict between Napoleon and Snowball (Ch. V), parallelling "the two rival and quasi-Messianic beliefs that seemed pitted against one another: Trotskyism, with its faith in the revolutionary vocation of the proletariat of the West; and Stalinism with its glorification of Russia's socialist destiny"; Napoleon's dealings with Whymper and the Willingdon markets (Ch. VI), paralleling the Treaty of Rapallo; and Frederick's forged bank notes, parallelling the Molotov–Ribbentrop Pact of August 1939, after which Frederick attacks Animal Farm without warning and destroys the windmill.

The book's close, with the pigs and men in a kind of rapprochement, reflected Orwell's view of the 1943 Tehran Conference (Note: Preface to the Ukrainian edition of Animal Farm, reprinted in Orwell:Collected Works, It Is What I Think) that seemed to display the establishment of "the best possible relations between the USSR and the West"—but in reality were destined, as Orwell presciently predicted, to continue to unravel. More broadly, the ending has been interpreted as underscoring how distinctions between ruling groups can blur over time, reinforcing the idea that the consolidation of power may follow similar patterns regardless of the system from which it originates.

Similarly, the music in the novel, starting with "Beasts of England" and the later anthems, parallels "The Internationale" and its adoption and repudiation by the Soviet authorities as the anthem of the USSR in the 1920s and 1930s. These shifts have also been interpreted as reflecting the malleability of political messaging more generally, a feature observable in diverse political contexts across different eras.

According to Masha Gessen, the metamorphosis of the seventh commandment ("some animals are more equal") was likely inspired by a similar change of a party line which declared all Soviet people equal: the Russian nation and language suddenly became "first among equals" in official CPSU publications in 1936–1937. More generally, the phrase has entered common discourse as a shorthand for the erosion of equality under systems that initially promise fairness, a phenomenon that commentators have argued can arise under a wide range of political conditions, particularly in periods marked by strong personalities and weakened institutional constraints.

== Adaptations ==
=== Stage productions ===
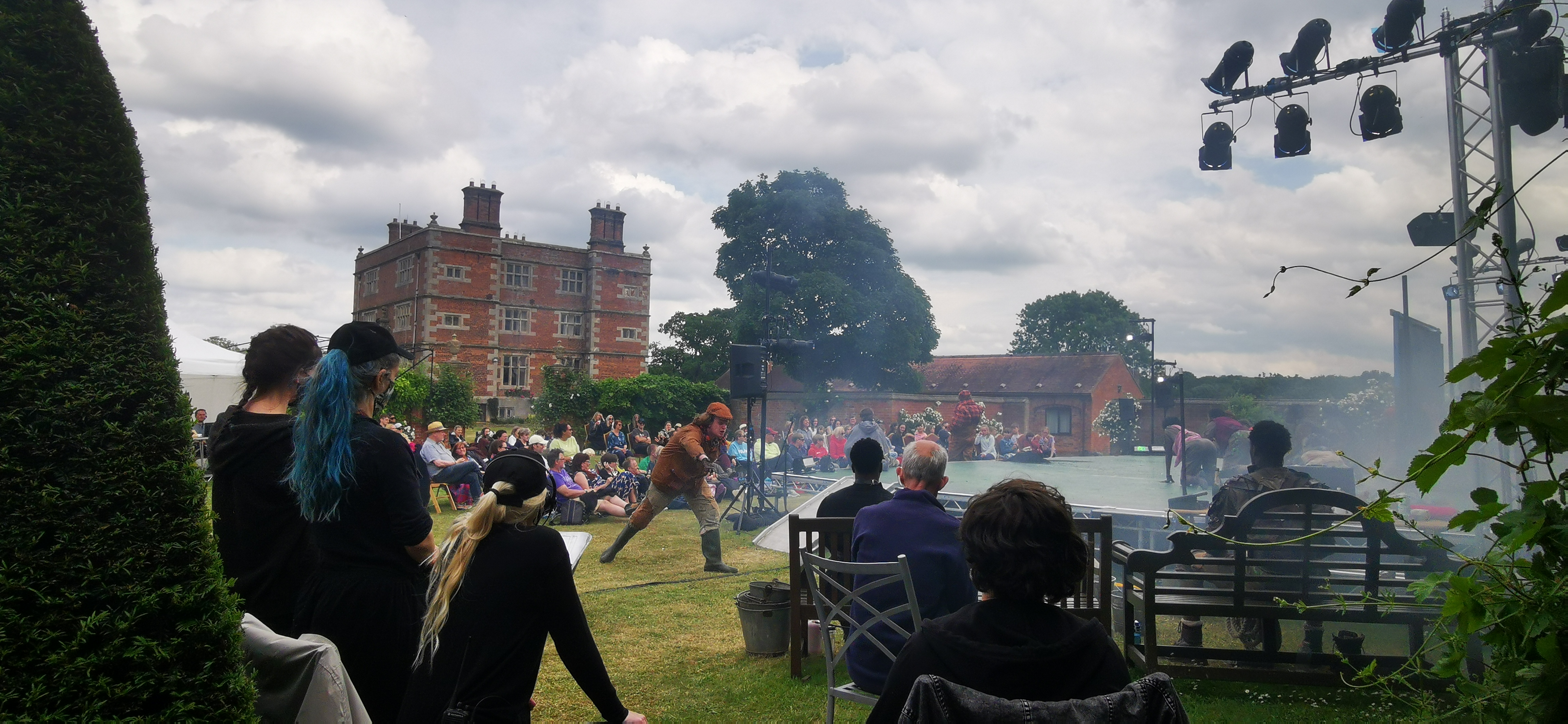
A National Youth Theatre performance of Animal Farm at Soulton Hall

A theatrical version, with music by Richard Peaslee and lyrics by Adrian Mitchell, was staged at the National Theatre London on 25 April 1984, directed by Peter Hall. It toured nine cities in 1985.

A solo version, adapted and performed by Guy Masterson, premiered at the Traverse Theatre Edinburgh in January 1995 and has toured worldwide since.

In 2021, during pandemic restrictions, the National Youth Theatre toured a stage version of Animal Farm; this run included outdoor performances on a farm at Soulton Hall.

A new adaptation written and directed by Robert Icke, designed by Bunny Christie with puppetry designed and directed by Toby Olié opened at the Birmingham Repertory Theatre in January 2022 before touring the UK.

The Russian composer Alexander Raskatov has written an opera based on the book. Its premiere took place on 4 March 2023 in Amsterdam as part of Dutch National Opera's 2022/2023 season.

=== Films ===
Animal Farm has been adapted to film three times.

- Animal Farm (1954) is an animated film, in which Napoleon is eventually overthrown in a second revolution. In 1974, E. Howard Hunt revealed that he had been sent by the CIA's Psychological Warfare department to obtain the film rights from Orwell's widow, and the resulting 1954 animation was funded by the agency.
- Animal Farm (1999) is a live-action TV version that shows Napoleon's regime collapsing in on itself, with the farm having new human owners, reflecting the collapse of Soviet communism.
- Animal Farm (2025) is an animated film, directed by Andy Serkis, with an alternative plot serving as an allegory for business corruption in the 21st century and features new characters such as a piglet named Lucky, who serves as the audience surrogate. It also depicts Snowball as female.

=== Radio dramatisations ===
A BBC radio version, produced by Rayner Heppenstall, was broadcast in January 1947. Orwell listened to the production at his home in Canonbury Square, London, with Hugh Gordon Porteous, amongst others. Orwell later wrote to Heppenstall that Porteous, "who had not read the book, grasped what was happening after a few minutes".

In January 2013, a second radio production was broadcast on BBC Radio 4, using Orwell's own dramatisation of his book, directed by Alison Hindell and narrated by Tamsin Greig. The cast included Nicky Henson as Napoleon, Toby Jones as the propagandist Squealer, Patrick Brennan as Snowball, Liza Sadovy as Clover, and Ralph Ineson as Boxer.

=== Comic strip ===
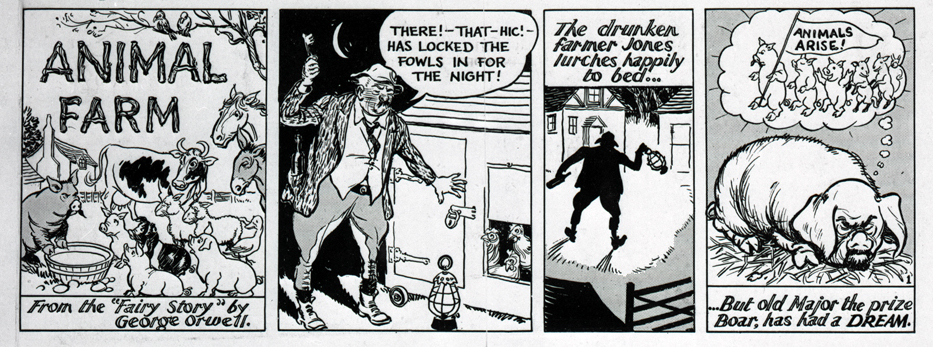
A Foreign Office copy of the first instalment of Pett and Freeman's Animal Farm comic strip

In 1950, Norman Pett and his writing partner Don Freeman were secretly hired by the Information Research Department, a secret department of the Foreign Office, to adapt Animal Farm into a comic strip. This comic was not published in the United Kingdom but ran in Brazilian and Burmese newspapers.

=== Video game ===
Orwell's Animal Farm is a video game based on the book, developed by Nerial and The Dairymen and released in 2020, with permission from the Orwell Estate. The game is available on Windows, macOS, iOS, and Android.

== See also ==
- Information Research Department
- Authoritarianism
- History of Soviet Russia and the Soviet Union (1917–1927)
- History of the Soviet Union (1927–1953)
- Ideocracy
- New class
- Anthems in Animal Farm
- Animals, Pink Floyd album loosely based on Animal Farm

=== Books ===
- Gulliver's Travels was a favourite book of Orwell's. Swift reverses the role of horses and human beings in the fourth book. Orwell brought to Animal Farm "a dose of Swiftian misanthropy, looking ahead to a time 'when the human race had finally been overthrown."
- The Farm Animals' Revolt (Скотской бунт), published in 1917 by Russian historian Nikolai Kostomarov, has a similar premise to Animal Farm.
- Bunt (Revolt), published in 1924 by Polish Nobel laureate Władysław Reymont, has a similar premise to Animal Farm.
- White Acre vs. Black Acre, published in 1856 by William M. Burwell, is a satirical novel that features allegories for slavery in the United States similar to Animal Farm's portrayal of Soviet history.
- George Orwell's own Nineteen Eighty-Four is a dystopian novel about totalitarianism.
