= Far Cry (disambiguation) =

Far Cry is a series of first-person shooter video games.

Far Cry may also refer to:

- Far Cry (album), a 1960 album by jazz musicians Eric Dolphy and Booker Little
- "Far Cry" (Marvin Gaye song), 1981
- "Far Cry" (Rush song), 2007
- Far Cry (video game), the first in the series
- Far Cry (film), a 2008 German film adapted from the video game
- A Far Cry (film), a 1959 documentary about displaced persons after the Korean War
- The Far Cry, a 1926 American silent epic drama film
- A Far Cry, a Boston-based chamber orchestra
- "A Far Cry", a song from the 1992 album Aqua by Asia
- The Far Cry, a 1949 novel by Emma Smith
- The Far Cry, a 1951 crime novel by Fredric Brown
