= Orwell's list =

Potential Stalin sympathisers secretly identified by George Orwell

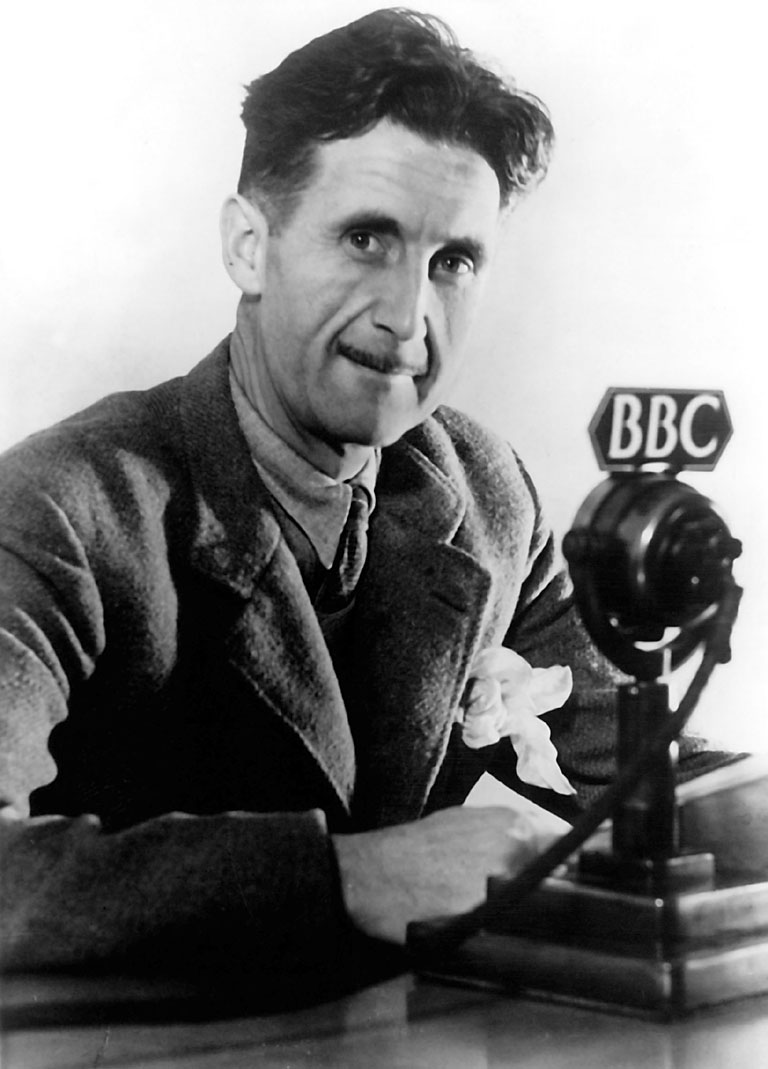
George Orwell

In 1949, shortly before he died, English author George Orwell prepared a list of notable writers and other people he considered to be unsuitable as possible writers for the anti-communist propaganda activities of the Information Research Department, a secret propaganda organisation of the British state under the Foreign Office. A copy of the list was published in The Guardian in 2003 and the original was released by the Foreign Office soon after.

== Background ==
The Information Research Department (IRD) was a secret propaganda wing of the UK Foreign Office, dedicated to disinformation warfare, anti-communism, and pro-colonial propaganda. The IRD was created in 1948 by Clement Attlee's Labour government, and became both the largest wing of the Foreign Office and the longest running covert government propaganda department in British history.

Celia Kirwan, a close friend of Orwell, who had just started working as Robert Conquest's assistant at the IRD, visited Orwell in March 1949, at a sanatorium where he was being treated for tuberculosis. Orwell wrote a list of names of people he considered sympathetic to Stalinism and therefore unsuitable as writers for the Department, and enclosed it in a letter to Kirwan. The list became public in 2003.

Having worked for Cyril Connolly's Horizon magazine, and briefly as an editorial assistant for Humphrey Slater's Polemic, Kirwan was Arthur Koestler's sister-in-law and one of the four women to whom Orwell proposed after the death of his wife Eileen O'Shaughnessy in 1945. Although Koestler had supported such a match, Kirwan turned him down.

== Notebook ==
Orwell based his list on a private notebook he had maintained since the mid-1940s of possible "cryptos", "F.T." (his abbreviation for fellow travellers), members of the Communist Party of Great Britain, agents and sentimental sympathisers. The notebook, now at the Orwell Archive at University College London, contains 135 names in all, including US writers and politicians. Ten names had been crossed out, either because the person had died or because Orwell had decided that they were neither crypto-communists nor fellow travellers. The people named were a mélange: "some famous, some obscure, some he knew personally and others he did not." Orwell commented in New Leader in 1947:

The important thing to do with these people – and it is extremely difficult, since one has only inferential evidence – is to sort them out and determine which of them is honest and which is not. There is, for instance, a whole group of M.P.s in the British Parliament (Pritt, Zilliacus, etc.) who are commonly nicknamed "the cryptos". They have undoubtedly done a great deal of mischief, especially in confusing public opinion about the nature of the puppet regimes in Eastern Europe; but one ought not hurriedly to assume that they all hold the same opinions. Probably some of them are actuated by nothing worse than stupidity.

The notebook contained columns with names, comments and various markings. Typical comments were: Stephen Spender – "Sentimental sympathiser... Tendency towards homosexuality"; Richard Crossman – "Too dishonest to be outright F. T."; Kingsley Martin –"Decayed liberal. Very dishonest"; and Paul Robeson – "very anti-white. [Henry] Wallace supporter". Journalist Geoffrey Wheatcroft considered Orwell's remarks "perceptive and sometimes even generous", going on to say that "DN Pritt is described as an 'almost certainly underground' Communist but also a "Good MP (i.e. locally). Very able and courageous'". Among the names, Orwell selected 38 which he forwarded to Kirwan.

Richard Rees discussed the names with Orwell, later commenting that it was "a sort of game we played – discussing who was a paid agent of what and estimating to what lengths of treachery our favourite bêtes noires would be prepared to go." Orwell asked Rees to fetch the notebook from Orwell's former residence on the Scottish island of Jura in early 1949, thanking him in a letter of 17 April.

One of Orwell's biographers, Bernard Crick, thought there were 86 names in the list and that some of the names were written in the hand of Koestler, who also co-operated with the IRD in producing anti-Communist propaganda.

Orwell was an ex-colonial policeman in Burma and, according to Timothy Garton Ash, he liked making lists: "In a 'London Letter' to Partisan Review in 1942, he wrote, 'I think I could make out at least a preliminary list of the people who would go over to the Nazi side if the Germans occupied England.'"

== Reactions to the list ==
The British press had known about the list for several years before it was officially made public in 2003. In 1996, The Independent discussed the list and who was named on it in an article headlined, "Orwell's little list leaves the left gasping for more". In 1998, The Daily Telegraph used the headline "Socialist Icon Who Became an Informer".

Michael Foot, the former leader of the Labour Party, and a friend of Orwell in the 1930s and 1940s, was "amazed" by the revelation. Richard Gott, who in 1994 had resigned as literary editor of The Guardian after admitting that he had accepted travel expenses from the KGB in an unrelated case, referred to Orwell's list as only a "small surprise".

The journalist and activist Norman MacKenzie, who was on the list, noted "Tubercular people often could get very strange towards the end. I'm an Orwell man, I agreed with him on the Soviet Union, but he went partly ga-ga I think. He let his dislike of the New Statesman crowd, of what he saw as leftish, dilettante, sentimental socialists who covered up for the Popular Front in Spain [after it became communist-controlled] get the better of him."

Bernard Crick justified Orwell wanting to help the post-war Labour government. "He did it because he thought the Communist Party was a totalitarian menace," he said. "He wasn't denouncing these people as subversives. He was denouncing them as unsuitable for a counter-intelligence operation."

The journalist and writer Alexander Cockburn was strongly critical of Orwell's actions, referring to the notebook as "a snitch list". Cockburn attacked Orwell's description of Paul Robeson as "anti-white", pointing out Robeson had campaigned to help Welsh coal miners. Cockburn also said the list revealed Orwell as a bigot: "There seems to be general agreement by Orwell's fans, left and right, to skate gently over Orwell's suspicions of Jews, homosexuals and blacks".

Professor Peter Davison, editor of Orwell's Complete Works, said those who would be really disappointed would be those who claimed to have been on the list but were not.

The historian John Newsinger considered it "a terrible mistake on his part, deriving in equal measure from his hostility to Stalinism and his illusions in the Labour government. What it certainly does not amount to, however, is an abandonment of the socialist cause or transformation into a footsoldier in the Cold War. Indeed, Orwell made clear on a number of occasions his opposition to any British McCarthyism, to any bans and proscriptions on Communist Party members (they certainly did not reciprocate this) and any notion of a preventive war. If he had lived long enough to realise what the IRD was actually about there can be no doubt that he would have broken with it".

The journalist Neal Ascherson was critical of Orwell's decision to give the information to the IRD, claiming "there is a difference between being determined to expose the stupidity of Stalinism and the scale of the purges and throwing yourself into the business of denouncing people you know". The journalist and activist Paul Foot said the revelations would not detract from Orwell's reputation as a great writer, noting "I am a great admirer of Orwell, but we have to accept that he did take a McCarthyite position towards the end of his life". In 2003, Celia Kirwan (Celia Goodman) said that Orwell was quite right to do it because "the only thing that was going to happen to them was that they wouldn't be asked to write for the Information Research Department". In a 2002 essay for the New York Review of Books, Christopher Hitchens wrote: "All too much has been made of this relatively trivial episode, the last chance for Orwell's enemies to vilify him for being correct".

== The list ==
The final list submitted to the IRD contains 38 names, along with remarks by Orwell about the person in question:

Name	Job	Remarks
Aldred (Christian name?) [likely James Aldridge]	Novelist ("Of many Men" etc.)	Qy. whether open C.P. member.
Anderson, John	Industrial Correspondent (Manchester Guardian)	Probably sympathiser only. Good reporter. Stupid.
Beavan, John	Editor (Manchester Evening News and other papers)	Sentimental sympathiser only. Not subjectively pro-C.P. May have changed views.
Blackett, Professor P.M.S.	Scientific populariser (physics)	
Calder-Marshall, Arthur	Novelist and journalist	Previously close fellow-traveler. Has changed, but not reliably. Insincere person.
Carr, Professor E.H.	The "Times". Aberystwith [sic] University. Books on Bakunin etc.	Appeaser only.
Chaplin, Chas.	Films	?
Childe, Professor Gordon	Scientific populariser (anthropology and history of science)	??
Crowther, J.G.	Scientific populariser	Qy. whether open C.P. member.
Deutscher, I.	Journalist (Observer, Economist and other papers)	Sympathiser only. Is Polish Jew. Previously Trotskyist, and changed views chiefly because of Jewish issue. Could change again.
Dover, Cedric	Writer ("Half Caste" etc.) and journalist. Trained as zoologist.	Is Eurasian. Main emphasis anti-white (especially anti-U.S.A.), but reliably pro-Russian on all major issues. Very dishonest, venal person.
Driberg, Tom	M.P. for Malden, and columnist (Reynolds' News, previously Daily Express)	Usually named as "crypto", but in my opinion NOT reliably pro-C.P.
Duranty, W. (Anglo-U.S.)	Well-known foreign correspondent. Books on Russia etc.	
Goldring, D.	Writer (mainly novels)	Disappointed careerist.
Hooper, Major [Arthur Sanderson] (initials?)	Military expert. Pamphlets, books on U.S.S.R.	
Jacob, Alaric	Foreign Correspondent (D. Express and other papers)	
Kohn, Marjorie	Teacher and Journalist (New Statesman and other papers)	Silly sympathiser.
Litauer, Stefan	Foreign affairs expert, News Chron. Polish correspondent circa 1943-6	Obviously dishonest. Said to have been previously Pilsudski supporter.
Mackenzie, Norman	Journalist (New Statesman)	Qy. whether open C.P. member.
Macmurray, Professor John	S.C.M. National Peace Council. Personalist movement. Many books	?? No organisational connection, but very pro-U.S.S.R. subjectively. It is worth noting that the French branch of the Personalist Movement is partly dominated by fellow-travellers.
Martin, H. Kingsley	Ed. New Statesman	?? Too dishonest to be outright "crypto" or fellow-traveller, but reliably pro-Russian on all major issues.
McDiarmid [sic], Hugh (C.M. Grieve)	Poet and critic. Scottish Nationalist Movement.	Dissident Communist but reliably pro-Russian.
McLeod [sic], Joseph	Writer on theatrical subjects, previously B.B.C. announcer	??
Mende, Tibor	Foreign Affairs expert. Books.	Hungarian. Perhaps sympathiser only.
Mitchison, N.	Novelist	Silly sympathiser. Sister of J.B.S. Haldane.
Moore, Nicholas	Poet	? Anarchist leanings.
Morley, Iris	Foreign Correspondent (Observer and other papers)	Very strong fellow-traveller. Qy. whether open C.P. member.
Neumann, R.	Novelist. Edited "International Authors" for Hutchinsons for some years.	German
O'Donnell, Peader [sic]	Critic	Qy. whether open C.P. member.
Padmore, George	League against Imperialism, and kindred activities. Many pamphlets	Negro. Dissident Communist (expelled from C.P. about 1936) but reliably pro-Russian.
Parker, Ralph	Foreign correspondent (News Chronicle and other papers)	
Priestley, J.B.	Novelist and broadcaster	??
Redgrave, Michael	Actor	??
Schiff, Leonard (the Rev.)	C. of E. parson (modernist). Knowledge of India. Pamphlets.	?
Smollett, Peter (real name Smolka?)	Correspondent, D. Express etc. Russian section of M.O.I. during war	Said by C. Pers to be mere careerist, but gives strong impression of being some kind of Russian agent. Very slimy person.
Stewart, Margaret	Journalist (News Chronicle, Economist and other papers). Active in N.U.J.	About 5 years ago was underground member of C.P. May just possibly have changed her views. Very able person.
Werth, Alexander	Foreign Correspondent (Manchester Guardian and other papers)	? May not be fellow-traveller but gives that impression.
Young, Commander E.P. (R.N.)	Naval expert. Pamphlets.	Almost certainly "crypto".

== The notebook ==
The original list in Orwell's notebook contains 135 names. A partial version, "as complete as the laws of libel allow", but with 36 names withheld, was published in vol. 20 of The Complete Works of George Orwell, edited by Peter Davison, in 1998. The names included there, except for the ones submitted to the IRD and already listed above, are the following:

- Louis Adamic, Slovene-American writer (erroneously described as "Croat" in the notebook)
- Gerald Bailey, Liberal politician and directing secretary of the National Peace Council
- J. D. Bernal, natural scientist
- Bessie Braddock, Labour MP
- Tom Braddock, Labour MP
- E. H. S. Burhop, physicist (named as "Burhop (initial)" in the notebook)
- W. P. Coates, author on Soviet affairs and left-wing activist
- Zelda Coates, author on Soviet affairs and left-wing activist
- Seymour Cocks, Labour MP (crossed out by Orwell)
- G. D. H. Cole, economist
- Richard Crossman, Labour MP
- A. J. Cummings, News Chronicle columnist (crossed out by Orwell)
- Nancy Cunard, heiress and left-wing activist
- Sidney Dark, journalist, former editor of Church Times (died in 1947; crossed out by Orwell)
- John Davenport, literary critic
- Joseph E. Davies, former US ambassador to the Soviet Union
- Cecil Day-Lewis, poet
- Vera M. Dean, Russian-American political scientist, Foreign Policy Association research director
- Maurice Edelman, Labour MP and journalist, Reynold's News
- Janet Flanner ("Genêt"), American journalist, The New Yorker
- Fletcher, "Labour Party agent for Stroud" (possibly a George Fletcher, who briefly commanded the British Battalion of the International Brigades during the Spanish Civil War)
- Heinrich Fraenkel, author
- Louis Golding, novelist
- Rev. Fr. St John Groser, Anglican priest (misspelled as "Grozer" in the notebook)
- Maurice Hindus, Russian-American writer and journalist
- Tom Hopkinson, Picture Post editor
- Emrys Hughes, Labour MP, editor of Forward
- Lester Hutchinson, Labour Independent Group MP
- Ralph Ingersoll, American publisher, editor of PM
- Hewlett Johnson, Dean of Canterbury (named as "Hewlett-Johnson (initials?)" in the notebook)
- Freda Kirchwey, American journalist, editor of The Nation
- Fiorello La Guardia, former mayor of New York City (died in 1947; crossed out by Orwell)
- Harold Laski, economist, former Labour Party chairman (named as "LASKI!" in the notebook)
- Kenneth Leslie, Canadian poet, editor of The Protestant
- A. J. Liebling, American journalist, The New Yorker
- Fred Longden, Labour MP
- Ian Mackay, News Chronicle columnist and industrial correspondent (crossed out by Orwell)
- Leah Manning, Labour MP
- F. O. Matthiessen, American literary critic (misspelled as "Mathieson" in the notebook)
- Alan Nunn May, physicist and convicted Soviet spy
- Joseph McCabe, author and freethinker
- Ian Mikardo, Labour MP, Tribune columnist
- Emmanuel Mounier, French personalist philosopher
- Scott Nearing, American left-wing activist and writer
- Reinhold Niebuhr, American Protestant theologian (Orwell has remarked "NB. Two people of this name?"; there may be confusion with his brother, H. Richard Niebuhr, also a Protestant theologian)
- Seán O'Casey, Irish playwright
- Liam O'Flaherty, Irish novelist
- Sir Bernard Pares, historian, expert on Russia
- B. T. Parkin, Labour MP (misspelled as "Parker" in the notebook)
- Claude Pepper, US Senator
- John Platts-Mills, Labour Independent Group MP and barrister
- D. N. Pritt, Labour Independent Group MP and barrister
- George Reavey, Irish-Russian poet and literary critic
- Paul Robeson, actor and singer
- Maurice Schumann, French politician, journalist, and World War II hero (misspelled as "Maurice L. Schuman" in the notebook, and named as a contributor to PM and The New Republic; it is likely that Orwell was thinking of the American historian and political scientist Frederick L. Schuman)
- G. B. Shaw, Irish playwright
- Upton Sinclair, American writer and muckraker journalist (crossed out by Orwell following his denunciation of the 1948 Czechoslovak coup d'état)
- Edgar Snow, American correspondent, author of Red Star Over China (1937)
- L. J. Solley, Labour Independent Group MP (named as "Solley (inits.)" in the notebook)
- Stephen Spender, poet and literary critic
- Olaf Stapledon, novelist and philosopher
- John Steinbeck, novelist
- Anna Louise Strong, American journalist and left-wing activist
- S. T. Swingler, Labour MP
- A. J. P. Taylor, historian (crossed out by Orwell following his "anti-CP. line at Wroclaw Conference")
- George Thomson, professor of Greek, University of Birmingham
- Louis Untermeyer, American poet, literary critic, and anthologist
- Henry Wallace, editor-in-chief, The New Republic; former vice president of the United States
- William Warbey, Labour MP and author
- Victor Weisz, German-British political cartoonist (named under his pseudonym "Vicky" in the notebook)
- Orson Welles, film director
- Konni Zilliacus, Labour Independent Group MP and author
- Solly Zuckerman, professor of anatomy, University of Birmingham (misspelled as "Zuckermann" in the notebook)

== See also ==
- "Christmas tree" files
