= Crypto-politics =

Crypto-politics is the secret support for a political belief. It may refer to:

- Crypto-communism
- Crypto-fascism
- Synarchism: rule by a secret elite
- Cryptocracy
- Political aspects of cryptocurrency
