= Iris Morley =

English historian and journalist (1910–1953)

Iris Vivienne Morley (10 May 1910 – 27 July 1953) was an English historian, writer and journalist.

Morley was born at Carshalton, Surrey, the daughter of Colonel Lyddon Charteris Morley CBE and Gladys Vivienne Charteris Braddell. She married Ronald Gordon Coates of the Devonshire Regiment on 10 January 1929. The couple divorced in 1934 and she married Alaric Jacob on 2 August 1934.

With Jacob, she was in America for a period where he was based as a foreign correspondent, and they stayed there until the beginning of World War II. During the war, she wrote her trilogy of historical novels - Cry Treason (1940), We Stood For Freedom (1941) and The Mighty Years (1943) - with James Scott, the Duke of Monmouth, and William III, as central characters. Jacob was away for two years at this time reporting from war zones.

She accompanied her husband to Moscow in January 1944 and wrote her work Soviet Ballet published in 1945. Morley was a journalist for The Observer and The Yorkshire Post. She became a Communist and her ideas strongly influenced her husband. She appears in Jacob's book Scenes from a Bourgeois Life published in 1949 as Miranda Ireton.

That same year, she and her husband were included on Orwell's list of people he considered unsuitable to be authors for the Information Research Department. This list was prepared in March 1949 by George Orwell for his friend Celia Kirwan at the IRD, a propaganda unit set up at the Foreign Office by the Labour government.

In August 1948, Jacob had joined the BBC monitoring service at Caversham, but in February 1951 he was "suddenly refused establishment rights, which meant he would receive no pension." By this, time Jacob and his wife were separated but his establishment and pension rights were only restored shortly after Iris Morley died in 1953.

Jacob and Morley had a daughter. After her death he married the actress Kathleen Byron.

== Publications ==
- The Proud Paladin New York: William Morrow & Co, 1936
- Cry Treason London: Peter Davies, 1940
- We Stood for Freedom New York: William Morrow and Co, 1942
- The Mighty Years London: Peter Davies, 1943
- Soviet Ballet London: Collins, 1945
- Nothing but Propaganda London: Peter Davies, 1946
- Not Without Fantasy London: Peter Davies, 1947
- The Rose and the Star In collaboration with Phyllis Manchester 1949
- The Rack London: Peter Davies, 1952
- A Thousand Lives London: Andre Deutsch
