= Alaric Jacob =

English writer & journalist (1909–1995)

Harold Alaric Jacob (8 June 1909 – 26 January 1995) was an English writer and journalist. He was a Reuters correspondent in Washington in the 1930s and a war correspondent during World War II in North Africa, Burma and Moscow.

== Early life ==
Alaric Jacob was the son of Ellen Hoyer, the daughter of a Danish missionary, and Lieutenant-Colonel Harold Fenton Jacob, a member of the Indian Army and former political agent in Aden. Jacob was born in Edinburgh and brought up in Scotland. As a child, he spent time in India and Arabia, but was educated in England. He was a childhood friend of Soviet spy Kim Philby. Jacob developed a stammer, which he believed came from his association with Philby. This was managed over time by singing lessons.

Like several other promising children from Anglo-Indian or military families, Jacob attended St Cyprian's School for reduced fees. English novelist George Orwell left the school the year before Jacob started, and was presented as an inspiration to the students. Jacob's first term at St Cyprian's overlapped with English writer and literary critic Cyril Connolly's last year there. Connolly gave a lesson in Jacob's last year. For Jacob it was "an age of friendships, of excitement on the cricket fields and in school plays, of singing to a receptive audience at concerts, of having a sonnet printed in the school magazine, of winning the Townsend Warner History Prize." Jacob struggled with the classics and did not enter for a scholarship to public school. He instead studied at The King's School, Canterbury; however, unimpressed with what he was learning, he left school and moved to France to pursue a career in journalism.

== Career ==
=== Writing and journalism ===
While in France, Jacob began writing, returning to England after the General Strike. When he was seventeen, his first play was produced in Plymouth, where he started his career as a journalist on the Western Morning News. His second play, The Compleat Cynic, was produced in Plymouth the following year. In 1930, Seventeen, his first novel was published. It is a fictionalized account of his school days in Canterbury. By then, he had become a close friend of Margot Asquith, forty years his senior, who became his mentor and literary influence. She introduced him to editors and important literary figures, including Sir Roderick Jones, the head of Reuters, and was offered a position as diplomatic correspondent for Reuters in London.

During his time in London, Jacob moved in high social and intellectual circles. He wrote a play in which the hero was a communist and as a result, decided to read Das Kapital. In 1934, he married Iris Morley, daughter of Lieutenant Colonel Chartres Morley. She was a historical novelist and journalist for The Observer and the Yorkshire Post. Early in their marriage, they bonded amidst the Great Depression and hunger marches. This period stirred up socialist sentiments in the couple. In 1936, the Jacobs went to Washington where he was in regular and close contact with US President Franklin D. Roosevelt. They stayed in Washington until the outbreak of World War II, when they returned to London.

=== War correspondent ===
First edition

Jacob remained in London until May 1941 when became a war correspondent for the Daily Express. He sailed to Cairo, taking the long sea route via Cape Town. He spent the next two years with the 8th Army in North Africa, initially covering the Siege of Tobruk and Operation Crusader. He was withdrawn from Tobruk shortly before it fell to the Germans and was posted to Tehran where he received permission from the Soviet Embassy to visit the Red Army in Azerbaijan. He returned to Egypt for the first and second Battle of El Alamein, before traveling to India. He covered Wingate's first 'Chindit' expedition in Burma, and the circumstances of Gandhi's fast. In the Soviet Union for four months, he covered the Battle of Kursk and Stalin's counterattack. He described his experiences in A Traveler's War published in 1944.

After Christmas leave in England in 1943, Jacob and Iris sailed to the Soviet Union in January 1944 on board a ship of the Arctic Convoy. They spent the remainder of the war in Moscow, covering the advances of the Red Army in Odessa, the Crimea, and through Vitebsk, Minsk, Poland, and on to the fall of Berlin. He published A Window in Moscow in 1945. His experiences made him sympathetic towards the Soviet regime and he stayed in the Soviet Union, on and off, until the start of the cold war in late 1947. Iris had become a Communist and her ideas strongly influenced him. He suspected that her membership of the Communist Party worked against him even when they were separated, and that he was blacklisted by the BBC and put on their "Christmas tree" list of potential political subversives as a result.

In 1949, Jacob published Scenes from a Bourgeois Life, a semi-autobiographical novel and an apologia for the paradoxes and anomalies of his career.

=== BBC ===
First edition

In August 1948, Jacob joined the BBC monitoring service in Caversham, Reading, but in February 1951 he was "suddenly refused establishment rights, which meant he would receive no pension". He complained unsuccessfully to his cousin Sir Ian Jacob, who was a senior figure in the BBC and later became the organization's Director-General. Some have attributed Jacob's problems to the fact that his name was on Orwell's list, a list of people with pro-communist leanings, prepared in March 1949 by Orwell for his friend Celia Kirwan at the Information Research Department, a propaganda unit set up at the Foreign Office by the Labour government. Jacob's establishment and pension rights were restored shortly after Iris (also on Orwell's list) died in 1953. By the time he retired in 1972, Jacob had become a senior editor at Bush House, then the base of the BBC World Service.

In 1971, Jacob published Eminent Nonentities, a book of short stories about the unknown characters he encountered as a war correspondent.

== Personal life ==
After Iris died in 1953, Jacob married British actress Kathleen Byron. He had one daughter with Iris Morley, and a son and daughter with Byron.

Journalist Paul Hogarth described Jacob in his obituary as the quintessential English journalist; urbane yet modest, with a bone-dry sense of humor and a razor intelligence. "He possessed the grand manner of an Edwardian foreign correspondent with an Alan-Clark-like taste for vintage claret, a good cigar and fine brandy".

Jacob died in Lambeth, London, aged 85 on 26 January 1995. Byron survived him; she died in January 2009.

== Publications ==
- Seventeen (1930)
- A Traveller's War (1944)
- A Window in Moscow (1946)
- Scenes from a Bourgeois Life (1949)
- Two Ways in the World (1962)
- A Russian Journey
- Eminent Nonentities (1971)

== Unpublished books ==
- A Snob's Guide to Socialism
- Lovers of the Lost
