= Peter Smollett =

British journalist and Soviet spy

Harry Peter Smollett, OBE (1912–1980), born Hans Peter Smolka and sometimes using that name as a pen name even after he changed it by deed poll, was a journalist for the Daily Express and later a Central Europe correspondent for The Times. During the Second World War, Smolka became head of the Russian section at Britain's Ministry of Information and was responsible for organising pro-Soviet propaganda. He was later identified as a Soviet agent.

Born in Vienna, he came to Britain in 1933 as an NKVD agent codenamed "ABO". Although he changed his name to Smollett on becoming a naturalised British subject in 1938, he returned to using the surname Smolka when he returned to Vienna after the war. According to the Mitrokhin Archive, Smollett had been recruited by Kim Philby.

George Orwell included him on the list of those who "in my opinion are crypto-communists, fellow-travellers or inclined that way and should not be trusted as propagandists" that he gave to the Information Research Department in 1949 as "almost certainly agent of some kind" and "a very slimy person" (see Orwell's list). Timothy Garton Ash stated that Smollett "was 'almost certainly' the civil servant on whose advice the London publisher Jonathan Cape rejected Orwell's Animal Farm as an unhealthily anti-Soviet text".

Graham Greene's biographer, Michael Shelden, refers to the inside joke that appears in the film The Third Man (1949), filmed in Vienna. Greene wrote the screenplay and used the name Smolka for a bar because Smolka/Smollett had given uncredited advice on the filming.
