= "Christmas tree" files =

20th-century files kept by the BBC

From the 1930s until the 1980s, the BBC kept a number of clandestine files on applicants accused by MI5 of political subversion, in particular those deemed to be communists or fellow travellers of communism, and also members of far-right organisations. They were marked with a distinctive upward-facing green arrow, which bore resemblance to a Christmas tree and had the effect of blacklisting a number of applicants for roles in the BBC. Knowledge of the files was made public in 1985 after being reported on by The Observer. By that time, the practice had ceased, but a number of files remained. They were destroyed in the 1990s following the end of the Cold War.

== Process ==
From the late 1930s until 1984, MI5 stationed an intelligence officer at the BBC to vet editorial applicants. During World War II, those deemed to be political subversives, in particular suspected communists or fellow travellers of communism, were banned from working at the BBC. The personnel records of anyone suspicious were stamped with the legend "SECRET", a distinctively shaped green upward-facing arrow resembling a Christmas tree. Only a handful of BBC staff knew what the tag meant. The practice was secret and was officially denied until it became public knowledge when The Observer wrote about the practice in 1985, following leaked information from Mike Fentiman. The officer in charge of vetting at that time was Ronnie Stonham.

The "Christmas tree" scheme was dropped in 1984. Mike Fentiman claimed that the Christmas tree symbol was used because the Christmas carol "O Tannenbaum" had the same tune as the socialist song "The Red Flag". However, in 2020, on the BBC programme QI, it was claimed that the "Christmas tree" symbol was merely an arrow, indicating that a file should be referred upwards. Michael Hodder, who worked for the vetting unit in the 1980s, told The Times that all files were destroyed in the early 1990s as the Cold War ended.

== Categories ==
- Category A: MI5 "advises that the candidate should not be employed in a post offering direct opportunity to influence broadcast material for a subversive purpose".
- Category B: MI5 "advised" against employment "unless it is decided that other considerations are overriding".
- Category C: The individual should not be debarred unless the post gave "exceptional opportunity" for subversive activity.

The BBC's policy was to not employ someone in Category A, although this did happen sometimes.

== Organisations on the blacklist ==
- The Communist Party of Great Britain
- The Socialist Workers Party
- The Workers Revolutionary Party
- The Militant tendency
- The National Front
- The British National Party

Membership of these groups was not necessary for blacklisting; guilt by association was assumed.

== People who underwent vetting ==
In 1940, Hugh Greene – who later became Director-General of the BBC – was one of the first to undergo its security vetting, as MI5 mistakenly suspected Greene was a communist. Other people who underwent vetting and gained the "Christmas tree" tag on their file included:

- Anna Ford
- Paul Gambaccini (Note: He says this was due to him being gay, rather than any political reason)
- Renee Goddard
- John Goldschmidt
- Richard Gott
- Isabel Hilton
- Alaric Jacob
- Roland Joffé
- Joan Littlewood
- Ewan MacColl
- Stephen Peet
- Michael Rosen
- Paul Turner

== See also ==
- BBC controversies
- Orwell's list – Potential Stalin sympathisers secretly identified by George Orwell
- Executive Order 9835 – 1947 Loyalty Order by President Truman
