= John Peet (journalist, born 1915) =

John Scott Peet (1915 – 29 June 1988) was a British journalist who defected to East Germany (the German Democratic Republic) in 1950.

== Biography ==
=== Parental family ===
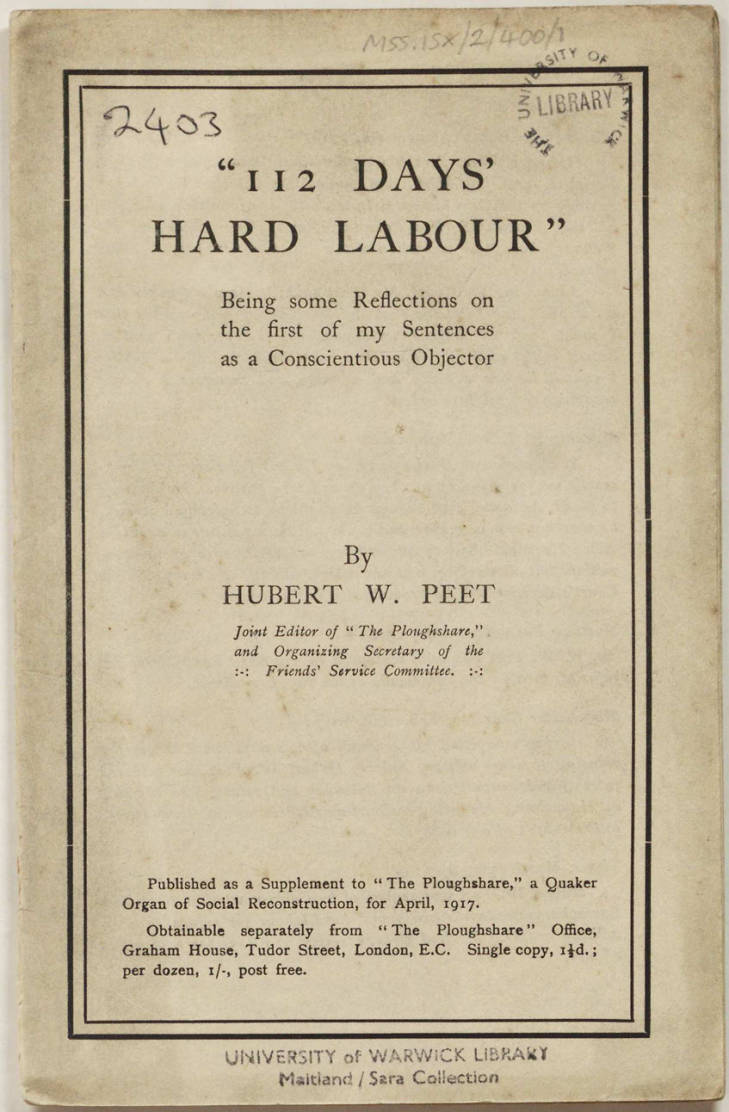
112 Days' Hard Labour by Peet's father Hubert

John Peet was born on 27 November 1915, the third child of Hubert William Peet (1886–1951) and his wife, Edith Mary, born Scott. He had two older sisters and a younger brother, Stephen. John's parents were Quakers, unlike his four grandparents who were Congregationalist. His mother's parents had served as missionaries.

Peet went to the Quaker boarding schools at Saffron Walden and then Bootham

His father was a journalist, who wrote religious news and also edited the weekly Quaker magazine The Friend from 1932 to 1949. He was also an absolutist conscientious objector, who suffered three terms of imprisonment for his refusal to obey military orders.

=== Grenadier Guard ===
"For complex reasons", after Quaker school, Peet joined the Grenadier Guards. According to his brother, Stephen, he was bought out after three months.

=== Spanish episode ===
Peet fought in the Spanish Civil War with the International Brigade.

He travelled and worked in various European cities, until 1939, when he joined the British Army, serving in the British Mandate of Palestine. There he ran the news section of Jerusalem Radio, until he was recruited by Reuters news agency in 1945.

=== International journalist ===
He worked for Reuters in Palestine, Vienna and Warsaw and covered the Nuremberg trials after World War II, November 1945 to October 1946.

=== Defection ===
After three years as a reporter in Berlin, Peet announced during a press conference in East Berlin in 1950 that he was leaving the West because of West German rearmament.

From 1952 to 1975, Peet produced the Democratic German Report, a fortnightly newsletter targeting the left-of-centre public opinion in the United Kingdom. His positive portrayal of the German Democratic Republic (GDR) was among the GDR's most believable and powerful propaganda in Britain.

He spent the last ten years of his life translating Marx and Engels into English. The Times (London) published three of his letters to the editor during his exile.

Many East Germans saw Peet as the archetypical Englishman, and he played this character in several East German films.

Peet was married four times. In 1952, he married the Bulgarian Ravensbrück survivor Georgia Tanewa (1923–2012) and they had two children.

He died in East Berlin on 29 June 1988, after a long illness. He was survived by his fourth wife, Engelgard. An autobiography, The Long Engagement, was published after his death, with an introduction by Len Deighton. In these memoirs, Peet writes about his defection stating he "could no longer serve the Anglo-American warmongers ...". He also writes about his relationship with Soviet intelligence.

== Other sources ==
- Friendly enemies: Britain and the GDR 1949-1990, by Stefan Berger and Norman Lapole; Berghahn Books, New York and London (2010). Text available online (minus index)
