= Song to the Men of England =

1819 political ballad

The Poetical Works of Percy Bysshe Shelley
- The 1839 first edition title page of The Poetical Works of Percy Bysshe Shelley
- Author: Percy Bysshe Shelley
- Language: English
- Published: 1839
- Publisher: Edward Moxon
- Publication place: England
- Pages: 314

"Song To the Men of England" is a 1819 political ballad by the English Romantic poet Percy Bysshe Shelley which called on the English working classes to fight for their rights and to resist economic exploitation. Written in 1819 following the Peterloo Massacre, it was not published until 1839 in the collected The Poetical Works of Percy Bysshe Shelley.

It was written in September 1819 while living in Italy as a passionate, revolutionary reaction to the Peterloo Massacre that had just occurred in Manchester, England, in August of that year.

Similar to The Masque of Anarchy and "England in 1819", it expresses one of his most powerful political statements. It was too dangerous to publish, too radical and revolutionary for its time.

It is a call for the working classes to rise up against economic exploitation in peaceful, non-violent resistance. It argues that laborers produce all the nation's wealth but receive none of the benefits. He uses the metaphor of bees serving "stingless drones" to describe English workers laboring to enrich an idle upper class.

== Background ==
The poem was written as a response to the Peterloo Massacre, which occurred on August 16, 1819, at St. Peter's Field in Manchester, England, when cavalry armed with sabers charged into a peaceful crowd of over 60,000 pro-democracy demonstrators. They killed at least 15 to 18 people and severely injured approximately 400 to 700 others.

The massacre was fueled by an economic crisis. Protesters were suffering from acute unemployment, famine, and high bread prices exacerbated by the Corn Laws. There was also no adequate political representation to address their grievances and concerns. Only about 2% to 11% of adult males had the right to vote in 1819. Manchester, experiencing rapid industrialization, was not represented in Parliament.

The protest was a peaceful rally that sought universal suffrage and parliamentary reform. The speaker at the event was scheduled to be Henry Hunt, a radical reformer. Magistrates issued arrest warrants for Hunt and other organizers due to fears of an insurrection and uprising. The Manchester and Salford Yeomanry attacked the protesters with sabers to make the arrests. The regular army cavalry unit, the 15th Hussars, were sent in to disperse the crowds. Most of the casualties sustained were from saber wounds, trampling, or the crushing of demonstrators attempting to leave by the blocked exits.

The satirical name "Peterloo" was coined by the liberal Manchester Observer newspaper as a mocking reference to the Battle of Waterloo.

The government defended the actions taken that day as necessary. As a consequence, the Six Acts were passed, which restricted public meetings and the press. The tragedy led to calls for reform which resulted in the Great Reform Act of 1832, with greater voting rights.

== Publication history ==
Written in Italy in September 1819 as a response to the Peterloo Massacre, it was initially suppressed. It remained unpublished during Shelley's lifetime due to the threat of sedition charges. It was first published in 1839. It first appeared in print in the four-volume The Poetical Works of Percy Bysshe Shelley (London: Edward Moxon) edited by Mary Shelley, in Volume III.

The poem was republished in Poems from Shelley selected and arranged by Stopford A. Brooke in 1880 in London by Macmillan under the section "Poems Consecrate to Liberty".

== Structure ==
The poem is divided into eight quatrains or four-line stanzas that use rhyming couplets, a pattern of AABB. It is technically a ballad, using a consistent meter that is similar to a chant or speech at a political rally. It is written in trochaic tetrameter with some variation. The majority of the lines consist of four sets of two beats, the first of which is stressed and the second is unstressed. Later there is a change to iambs.

The name of the poem also is rendered as "Song: To the Men of England", A Song: “Men of England”, and "To the Men of England".

== Summary ==
"Song to the Men of England" is an incendiary call for radical reform and even for revolution. Written in 1819 in response to the Peterloo Massacre, the poem challenges the working class to realize their own power, stop enriching the oppressive upper class, and fight for their rights.

The poem addresses the issue of economic exploitation through several key themes:

In a paradox of labor, Shelley asks workers why they toil to produce food, weave clothing, and forge weapons, only to see these goods given to "lords" and "tyrants" who do nothing.

He uses a bee and drone metaphor, comparing the working class to productive bees and the ruling upper class to "stingless drones" who sit idly and consume the honey the workers produce.

Shelley urges the workers to keep the fruits of their own labor. He advises them to "sow," "weave," and "forge" for their own benefit and self-defense rather than handing their output over to their oppressors.

He harshly criticizes the workers for being passive and attacks their submission, warning them that if they do not shake off their chains, they are literally digging their own graves.

Because of its radical, anti-establishment message, the poem was considered too dangerous to publish during Shelley's lifetime due to sedition laws. It did not see print until 1839, nearly 20 years after he wrote it.

Stanza One

Men of England, wherefore plough For the lords who lay ye low? Wherefore weave with toil and care The rich robes your tyrants wear?

The first stanza starts with the question of why the “Men of England,” or the working class, spend their lives plowing the fields "for their lords" when they are laid low. Why do they make the clothes that only the wealthy, or upper classes or aristocracy, wear, "your tyrants"?

Stanza Two

Wherefore feed and clothe and save From the cradle to the grave Those ungrateful drones who would Drain your sweat—nay, drink your blood?

Why do they spend their entire lives feeding, clothing, and protecting the “ungrateful drones” who would "drain your sweat" and “drink your blood".

He uses the device of asking rhetorical questions throughout the poem to throw doubt and uncertainty on its justness and correctness.

Stanza Three

Wherefore, Bees of England, forge Many a weapon, chain, and scourge, That these stingless drones may spoil The forced produce of your toil?

He presents an extended metaphor by invoking the phrase “bees of England", comparing the working class of England to working bees who are commanded by the “stingless drones” who only are concerned for their own benefit and gain at the expense and toil of the bees.

Stanza Four

Have ye leisure, comfort, calm, Shelter, food, love’s gentle balm? Or what is it ye buy so dear With your pain and with your fear?

What benefit do they derive from their work? Do they obtain “leisure, comfort, calm” and “shelter, food love’s gentle balm?” They sweat and toil merely to survive.

Their labors rarely bring them happiness and security. What do they "buy" that is “so dear” with their "pain" and "fear"? Only bare existence is what they obtain

Stanza Five

The seed ye sow, another reaps; The wealth ye find, another keeps; The robes ye weave, another wears; The arms ye forge, another bears.

The devices of repetition, anaphora, and parallelism, are used. This gives the words more power and makes them sound like a chant or a speech. The "Song" mimics the popular broadside ballad form meant to be sung in streets and taverns. No matter what “ye” do (“sow,” “find,” “weave,” “forge”), another takes it. Someone else “reaps,” “keeps,” “wears,” and “bears” all that is created by the working classes.

Stanza Six

Sow seed—but let no tyrant reap: Find wealth—let no imposter heap: Weave robes—let not the idle wear: Forge arms—in your defence to bear.

Workers are advised to look after their own interests. They should "sow" seeds for themselves and not let a "tyrant" "reap" them. They should keep their own wealth. They should make clothes for themselves, not for the "idle" rich. They should make weapons to defend themselves. They should strive to achieve lasting benefits from their efforts and toil.

Stanza Seven

Shrink to your cellars, holes, and cells— In hall ye deck another dwells. Why shake the chains ye wrought? Ye see The steel ye tempered glance on ye.

They will live in decrepit and dilapidated dwellings, "cellars", "holes", and "cells" if they do not safeguard their own interests. The homes they build for the wealthy they cannot afford or acquire. Why "shake" the “chains” they themselves made? They need to realize their predicament before the weapons they forged are used against them.

Stanza Eight

“With plough and spade and hoe and loom Trace your grave and build your tomb And weave your winding-sheet—till fair England be your Sepulchre.”

The poem ends with a stark and gloomy picture of the working class. The only thing they can look forward to is the solace of death. If they don't shake off the metaphorical chains, then they will end up in a grave they dug, wearing a shroud they wove, and underneath a tombstone they built. England will be a “Sepulcher” or a mausoleum filled with the bodies of the working class.

== Sources ==
- A’yun, Annisa Qurrota. "The Social Condition of England during 1800-1900 Reflected in 'Song to the Men of England' and 'England in 1819' by Percy B. Shelley." Diss. Diponegoro University, Semarang, Indonesia, 2015.
- Boyle, Catherine. Shelley in 1819: Poetry, Publishing and Radicalism. University of Surrey (United Kingdom), 1998.
- Chandler, James. England in 1819: The Politics of Literary Culture and the Case of Romantic Historicism. University of Chicago Press. 1998.
- Cox, Jeffrey N. Poetry and Politics in the Cockney School: Keats, Shelley, Hunt and their Circle (Cambridge Studies in Romanticism). Cambridge University Press, 2004.
- Cronin, Richard. "Asleep in Italy: Byron and Shelley in 1819." The Politics of Romantic Poetry: In Search of the Pure Commonwealth. London: Palgrave Macmillan UK, 2000. 156-180.
- Duff, David. Romance and Revolution: Shelley and the Politics of a Genre (Cambridge Studies in Romanticism). Cambridge University Press, 2005.
- Jost, François. "Anatomy of an Ode: Shelley and the Sonnet Tradition." Comparative Literature, Vol. 34, No. 3 (Summer, 1982), pp. 223–246.
- Laili, Ahmad Nur. "Pandangan Dan Harapan Percy Bysshe Shelley Terhadap Kelas Pekerja Inggris Seperti Tercermin Dalam Puisi Berjudul 'Song to the Men of England'." Dissertation. Diponegoro University, Semarang, Indonesia, 2008.
- LeGette, Casie. "From Citation to Recitation: Shelley’s “Men of England”." Remaking Romanticism: The Radical Politics of the Excerpt. Cham: Springer International Publishing, 2017. 167-212.
- O’Neill, Michael. "1819–1820: 'The Torrent of My Indignation'." Percy Bysshe Shelley: A Literary Life. London: Palgrave Macmillan UK, 1989. 93-124.
- Rumens, Carol. "Poem of the week: England in 1819: This week, a furious sonnet from Shelley whose attack on the ruling classes retains its power two centuries on." Guardian, 23 February 2009.
- Setyarini, Margani Rahma. "Literary Style in Percy Bysshe Shelley's 'Song to the Men of England'." Dissertation. Diponegoro University, Semarang, Indonesia, 2015.
- Shelley, Percy Bysshe. "Song to the Men of England." The Poetical Works. Volume III. London: Edward Moxon, 1839, p. 186.
- Stock, Paul. The Shelley-Byron Circle and the Idea of Europe (Palgrave Studies in Cultural and Intellectual History). Palgrave Macmillan, 2010.
- Vivante, Leone. "Shelley and the Creative Principle" in Shelley. Ed. George Ridenour. Englewood Cliffs: Prentice-Hall, 1965.
- Wasserman, Earl. Shelley: A Critical Reading. Baltimore: Johns Hopkins Press, 1971.
- Wasserman, Earl. The Subtler Language. Baltimore, Johns Hopkins Press, 1959.
- Wheatley, Kim. Shelley and His Readers: Beyond Paranoid Politics. University of Missouri, 1999.
- Wroe, Ann. Being Shelley: The Poet's Search for Himself. Pantheon, 2007.
- Xiaoli, Huang. "Comparison of 'Song to the Men of England' With 'Large Rat' of Book of Songs From the Approach of New Criticism." Psychology 13.12 (2023): 604-608. Wenzhou, China. https://www.davidpublisher.com/Public/uploads/Contribute/65a0e13524a8e.pdf
