= Crypto-communism =

Secret support or admiration for communism

Crypto-communism (or cryptocommunism) is a secret support for, or admiration of, communism. Individuals and groups have been labelled as crypto-communists, often as a result of being associated with, or influenced by communists. Crypto-communism among political leaders aided the sovietization of the Baltic states.

== Historical use of the term ==
In 1947, Winston Churchill described a crypto-communist as, "one who has not the moral courage to explain the destination for which he is making". In 1949, shortly before his death, George Orwell compiled a list for the Information Research Department of the British Foreign Office of thirty-eight journalists and writers who in his opinion were crypto-communists or fellow travellers.

In 1960, Bruce Hutchison described what he viewed as a crypto-communist threat from the left wing of the Liberal Democratic Party of Japan under Nobusuke Kishi. In West Germany, some accused the Social Democratic Party under the leadership of Willy Brandt of being a crypto-communist front.

The Black Book of Communism refers to some individuals as crypto-communist, namely Damyan Velchev and Ludvík Svoboda.

== See also ==
- Orwell's list
- Beefsteak Nazi
- Crypto-Christianity
- Crypto-fascism
- Crypto-Judaism
- Crypto-politics (disambiguation)
- People's Democracy Party (South Korea)
- PROFUNC
- Red-baiting
- McCarthyism
