= Ronnie Stonham =

Ronald Leonard Stonham (9 July 1927 – 5 August 2014) was the Special Assistant to the Director of Personnel at the BBC until 1985, later caught up in the scandal over MI5 monitoring of potential staff. He was educated at Portsmouth Grammar School, from where he joined the Post Office Engineering Department in 1944.

== Biography ==
In 1948 he was granted an Emergency Commission in the Royal Corps of Signals and posted to 2nd Divisional Signal Regiment in Germany. At the end of his National Service in 1949, he joined the Territorial Army with 3 (Line of Communication) Signal Regiment. Unfulfilled with civilian life after a taste of the military, he applied to return to the Royal Signals in 1951 and was granted a Regular Commission. He was posted to Cyprus then to the Canal Zone in early 1952, before moving to El Ballah to command 32nd Guards Brigade Signal Troop. It was here that he met his future wife, Joy, who was attached to the British Military Hospital. In 1954, the couple returned to Britain for their wedding and settled in Richmond, Yorkshire; the couple had three children. In 1957, Stonham was appointed Signal Officer, Joint Experimental Helicopter Unit at RAF Middle Wallop, where he was involved in day and night navigation and homing trials for military helicopters.

Postings to Malaya and Germany followed during the childhood of their three daughters. Stonham became increasingly involved in intelligence-based jobs as he was promoted through to Lieutenant Colonel, taking command of 4th Division Headquarters and Signal Regiment in Herford until 1971. The two years following command were with the Defence Intelligence Staff at the Ministry of Defence, spending time with the American forces in Vietnam during the "Vietnamisation" programme, also visiting Laos and Cambodia.

Promoted to Colonel in 1973, he was appointed Chief Instructor at the School of Signals in Blandford for two years. This was followed by six months on the Senior Officers' War Course at the Royal Naval College, Greenwich, and then 18 months as Chief Signal Officer, Headquarters 3rd Division at Bulford. On promotion to Brigadier in 1978, he commanded 12 Signal Brigade (Volunteers), being appointed an Aide-de-Camp to the Queen in July 1980.

His last tour, before retiring in July 1982, was as Brigadier General Staff (Author) in the Ministry of Defence where he wrote the classified operational history of the Northern Ireland campaign. As Special Assistant to the Director of Personnel, he occupied Room 105 at Broadcasting House in London from 1982, following his departure from the Army, until October 1988.

The role he inherited at the BBC was to liaise with MI5 regarding whether candidates for roles at the broadcasting corporation had suspicious political connections, particularly with communism (see: "Christmas tree" files). However, Stonham's role from his appointment in 1982 was to 'wind down' the vetting and reduce the number of BBC staff appointments that were subject to vetting. Sir Hugh Greene, a former Director-General of the BBC, said about Security Service vetting of BBC job applicants:

I was vetted in 1940. MI5 thought I was a Communist but it turned out to be a mistake.

Michael Grade, at the time Controller of BBC 1, also commented on the existence of Room 105, where Stonham was based:

I don't know about room 105, but it does sound like a good title for a drama series.

== Death ==
Stonham died on 5 August 2014, aged 87.
