= Stephen Peet =

English filmmaker (1920–2005)

Stephen Hubert Peet (16 February 1920 – 22 December 2005) was an English filmmaker, best known as a pioneer of illustrated oral history and his BBC television series Yesterday's Witness (1969–1981).

== Parental family and early life ==
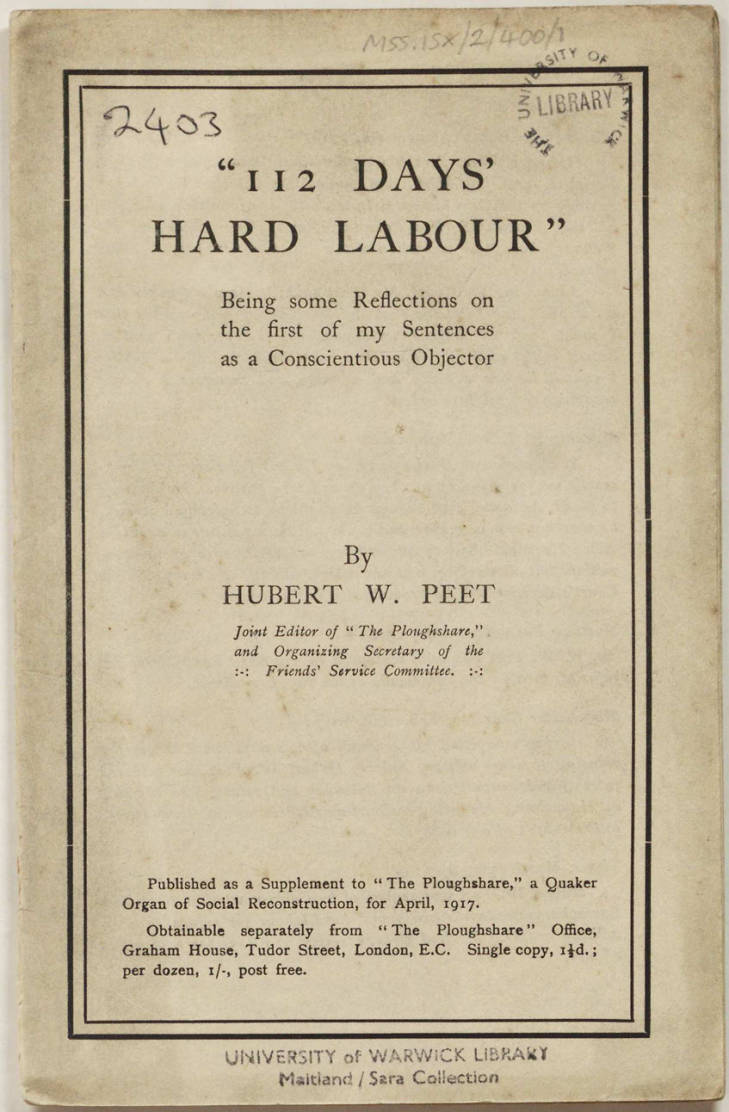
112 Days' Hard Labour by Peet's father Hubert

Stephen Hubert Peet was born on 16 February 1920, in Penge, South London, the youngest child of Hubert William Peet (1886 - 1951) and his wife, Edith Mary, born Scott. He had two older sisters and an older brother, John.

Stephen's parents were Quakers, unlike his four grandparents who were Congregationalists. His mother's parents had served as missionaries.

Stephen's father was a journalist, who wrote religious news and also edited the weekly Quaker magazine The Friend from 1932 to 1949. He was also an absolutist conscientious objector, who suffered three terms of imprisonment for his refusal to obey military orders.

Peet was educated at the Quaker Sidcot School, Somerset, where he met first his future wife, Olive, as a younger fellow pupil (they married in July 1948 )).

== Second World War ==
He was, like his father, a conscientious objector in World War II, serving with the Friends Ambulance Unit in London, north Africa and Greece, where he was taken prisoner on Kos, to become a civilian internee in Austria, then Germany. Following release after the war he began film work for the FAU, and then, with a former FAU colleague, Maurice Broomfield, for International Student Service.

== Film career ==
He had begun his career in the late 1930s as a camera assistant in the documentary unit run by Marian Grierson, sister of John Grierson. He worked in the Central Africa Film Unit for seven years, making narrative educational films for village audiences, before work at ITV and the BBC. Unknown until 1985, MI5 blocked Peet's career progression at the BBC in 1965, suspicious of him for retaining links with his older brother, John, a communist who defected to East Germany in 1950 (see: "Christmas tree" files).

With Yesterday's Witness, Peet pioneered having ordinary members of the public telling their stories straight to the camera. He worked with others on the series, including James Cameron. The BBC Two series in included a programme - "Prisoners of conscience: No to the State", no doubt a subject close to Stephen Peet's heart.

== Personal life ==
Stephen and Olive Peet had two sons, Graham and John, and twins, a boy and a girl, Michael and Susie.

== Sources ==
- Obituary in The Guardian: Stephen Peet: Filmmaker behind Yesterday's Witness by Steve Humphries, 17 February 2006
- Letter from Alan Dein: Stephen Peet's contribution to the oral history community in the UK, Guardian 22 March 2006
- Short biography
- Imperial War Museum interview with Stephen Peet by Lyn E Smith (Recorder) Catalogue number 11736, Production date 1990-10-30, ten reels of audio tape with text summary, available online

== See also ==
- A Far Cry (1959 film), directed by Stephen Peet
