= Peter Edgerly Firchow =

Peter Edgerly Firchow (December 16, 1937 – October 18, 2008) was an American literary scholar and educator. He wrote extensively on the relationship between British and German literature of the late 19th and early 20th centuries, and he was a leading scholar of the British writer Aldous Huxley. He served as a faculty member in the University of Minnesota English Department from 1967 to 2008 and as director of the university's Comparative Literature program from 1972 to 1978.

== Life and career ==
Peter Firchow was born December 16, 1937, in Needham, Massachusetts, United States, to a German father and Costa Rican mother. He eventually became fluent in English, Spanish, and German. In 1942, during World War II, Firchow's father was deported from the USA as a hostile alien, and the family followed him to Germany. The entire family returned to the USA in 1949 and settled in Cambridge, Massachusetts, where Firchow attended Cambridge Latin High School.

Firchow received B.A. and M.A. degrees in English literature at Harvard University and a Ph.D. in English from the University of Wisconsin–Madison in 1965, writing his dissertation on Aldous Huxley. He wrote or edited nine books and translated three from German to English. He also wrote over 50 articles and over 70 reviews.

Gerald Gillespie described two of Firchow's books as "great achievements in comparative literary studies": The Death of the German Cousin: Variations on a Literary Stereotype, 1890-1920, and Strange Meetings: Anglo- German Literary Encounters from 1910 to 1950. The latter was published just weeks before his death.

Firchow's wife, Evelyn S. Firchow, also a professor at the University of Minnesota, was a philologist and scholar of medieval German literature. She edited a collection of Firchow's essays, Reluctant Modernists: Aldous Huxley and Some Contemporaries. After his death Firchow was honored in a special edition of the Aldous Huxley Annual, which included an evaluation of his criticism and announced the establishment of the "Peter Edgerly Firchow Memorial Essay Prize in Aldous Huxley Studies."

== Selected bibliography ==
=== Books ===
- Friedrich Schlegel's "Lucinde" and the Fragments. Ed. and Trans. Minneapolis: U of Minnesota P, 1971.
- Aldous Huxley: Satirist and Novelist. Minneapolis: U of Minnesota P, 1972.
- The Writer's Place: Interviews on the Literary Situation in Contemporary Britain. Minneapolis: U of Minnesota P, 1971
- East German Short Stories: An Introductory Anthology. Ed. and Trans. with Evelyn S. Firchow. Boston: Twayne, 1979.
- The End of Utopia: A Study of Aldous Huxley's Brave New World. Lewisburg: Bucknell UP, 1984.
- The Death of the German Cousin: Variations on a Literary Stereotype, 1890-1920. Lewisburg: Bucknell UP, 1986.
- Envisioning Africa: Racism and Imperialism in Conrad's "Heart of Darkness". Lexington: UP of Kentucky, 1999.
- The Abbey. By Alois Brandstetter. Translated by Peter and Evelyn Firchow. Afterword by Peter Firchow. Riverside: Ariadne P, 1998.
- W.H. Auden: Contexts for Poetry. Newark: U of Delaware P, 2002.
- Reluctant Modernists: Aldous Huxley and Some Contemporaries. A Collection of Essays. Münster: LIT-Verlag, 2002.
- Modern Utopian Fictions from H.G. Wells to Iris Murdoch. Washington: Catholic U of America P, 2007.
- Strange Meetings: Anglo-German Literary Encounters from 1910 to 1960. Washington: Catholic U of America P, 2008.

=== Articles ===
- "Conrad, Goethe, and the German Grotesque." Comparative Literature Studies 13 (1976): 60-73.
- "Mental Music: Thomas Mann's The Magic Mountain and Aldous Huxley's Point Counter Point as Novels of Ideas." Studies in the Novel 9 (1977): 518-35.
- "Faschismus und die literarische Avantgarde in England zwischen den Kriegen." Faschismus und die Avantgarde. Ed. by Reinhold Grimm and J. Hermand. Königstein: Athenäum, 1980. 35-65.
- "Sunlight in the Hofgarten: The Wasteland and pre-1914 Munich." Anglia 111 (1993): 447-58.
- "Shakespeare, Goethe, and the War of the Professors, 1914-1918." Intimate Enemies: English and German Literary Reactions to the Great War, 1914-1918. Ed. Franz K. Stanzl and Martin Löschnigg. Heidelberg: Carl Winter, 1993. 177-86.
- "Literary Multilingualism and Modernity: The Anglo-American Perspective." Multilinguale Literatur im 20. Jahrhundert. Ed. Manfred Schmeling and Monika Schmitz-Emans. Würzburg: Königshausen & Neumann, 2002. 59-67.
