= A Far Cry (film) =

1959 British film about South Korea

- Directed by: Stephen Peet
- Written by: Stephen Peet
- Narrated by: Peter Finch
- Cinematography: Stephen Peet
- Edited by: Stephen Peet
- Music by: Max Saunders
- Production companies: Save the Children Fund, Oxfam
- Distributed by: BBC
- Release date: 1959
- Country: United Kingdom
- Language: English

A Far Cry (also known as Children of Korea) is a 1958 British documentary film directed by Stephen Peet about displaced persons in South Korea following the Korean War (1950–1953). It was commissioned by the Save the Children Fund UK and was broadcast in the UK by the BBC in 1959. It appears on the programme of two International Film Festivals in 2015.

Stephen Peet subsequently made many more documentary films for BBC TV, with the series title Yesterday's Witness.

== Production ==
The Save the Children UK archive records:

Save the Children was involved in using film from a very early time. As early as 1921, the Fund sent . . . a Daily Mirror photographer, to Russia to film scenes of the famine there. . . .

In 1958, on the initiative of Peter Blatchford, SCF Public Relations Officer, Stephen Peet, a director / cinematographer who had made training films in Africa, was sent to Korea to film SCF's work in Korea.

Some of the money was provided by the BBC, in return for TV broadcast rights. On his return, Stephen Peet put together the film, A Far Cry, which was broadcast on the BBC at Easter 1959 to great acclaim.

— Save the Children UK archive,

The International Documentary Film Festival Amsterdam 2015 brochure adds:

The purpose of the film was to raise funds. In order to keep the expenses as low as possible, Peet left for Korea alone with his Bolex camera and a few reels of black-and-white film, and worked with an interpreter there. He was shocked and angry because of what he saw in South Korea, particularly the bad living conditions of the people. He wanted to convey those emotions in his film. He filmed for two months in and around the city of Pusan

— IDFA 2015 Brochure online,

The 1959 Radio Times account of the film gives more information:

A filmed report on the fate of the thousands of children in South Korea whose families are refugees from the war, or who are abandoned or homeless, or sick, showing the conditions in which they live and the relief work that is being done for them by international voluntary agencies

- Commentary by Alan Burgess
- Music by Max Saunders
- Narrator, Peter Finch
- Directed, photographed, and edited by Stephen Peet

— Radio Times, indexed by BBC Genome project,

The Melbourne International Film Festival 2015 brochure adds:

At the port of Pusan a clinic issues milk and clothing to some of the children of the million refugees who fill the city and surrounding hills . . This film made by the Save the Children Fund with the help of the United Nations was shot in South Korea during November and December, 1958. It is a memorable documentary, made on a shoe-string budget, and is a series of individual stories which are linked with material which stresses the appalling general conditions in that country. The deliberately unsensational presentation of the horrifying life of a city where six children are abandoned every day makes a profound impression; a production with urgency as well as compassion.

— MIFF 2015 online brochure,

== Reception ==
The film was a success. The Save the Children Fund continued using the film to inform and fundraise.

With other material from the trip, [Stephen Peet] then made a short appeal film, Children of Korea. He also prepared a section of A Far Cry for BBC children's TV and this material was subsequently used as a film for child audiences - Mr Kim and the Beggar Boys.

— Save the Children UK archive,

== Sources ==
- National Archive: note of records held by Save the Children UK of the film work of the SCF Public Affairs Department. , accessed 13-06-2015
- Melbourne International Film Festival (MIFF) Festival programme 30-07 to 15-08-2015: Festival Archive - http://miff.com.au/festival-archive/film/14395, accessed 15-06-2015
- International Documentary Film Festival Amsterdam 18–29 November 2015 - website , accessed 13-06-2015
