= Vera Micheles Dean =

Russian-American political scientist

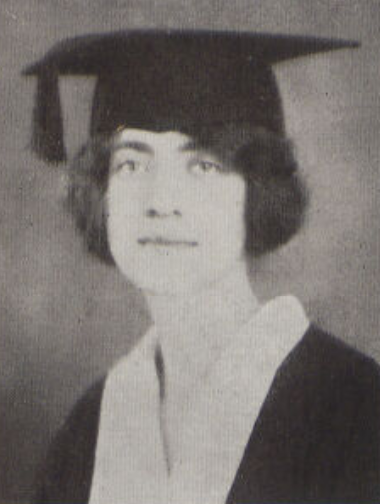
- Vera Micheles (later Dean), from the 1925 yearbook of Radcliffe College
- Born: Vera Micheles; March 29, 1903; Saint Petersburg, Russian Empire
- Died: October 10, 1972 (aged 69); New York City, U.S.
- Occupation: Political scientist

Vera Micheles Dean (née Micheles; March 29, 1903 – October 10, 1972) was a Russian-American political scientist. She was the head of research for the Foreign Policy Association, one of the leading think tanks of the 1940s and 1950s, where she became one of the leading authorities in international affairs during that period.

== Early life and schooling ==
Vera Micheles was born in Saint Petersburg as the eldest of three children. Her father, Alexander Micheles, was of German and Jewish ancestry, while her mother, Nadine (Kadisch) Micheles, was the daughter of German and Polish Jews who had been baptized into the Russian Orthodox church. Her parents were both intellectuals; her mother was educated in England, and spent her time translating English novels into Russian, while her father had spent several years in the United States, and occasionally worked as a reporter for Jewish newspapers in New York City. She was studied in the classics and learned seven foreign languages, including English, German and French. Her parents fled Russia after the Russian Revolution of 1917 and first moved to London, then to Boston. Dean enrolled at Radcliffe College, and after graduating in 1925, she won a Carnegie Endowment fellowship to Yale University where she earned an M.A in international law. She came back to Radcliffe for her Ph.D. and was soon hired by the Foreign Policy Association.

She married a New York City attorney, William Johnson Dean, and had two children. After the sudden death of her husband in 1936, to support her children she decided to dedicate more time with the Association.

== Career ==
=== Foreign Policy Association ===
In 1928, Dean was hired as an expert on the Soviet Union at the Foreign Policy Association (FPA). In 1936, she became head of the research department at the FPA. She became the main editor of the Association newspaper Foreign Policy Bulletin where she became a leading advocate of a collective security approach to American politics. Here she authored many Foreign Policy Reports, including those entitled “North Atlantic Defense Pact”, “Russia’s Foreign Economic Policy” and “Economic Trends in Eastern Europe”.

=== Foreign Politics ===
Dean was appointed by Governor Herbert H. Lehman as his adviser for the first American delegation to the United Nations and later as a consultant for The San Francisco Conference. In 1949, General Lucius D. Clay arranged for Dean to travel throughout Europe, visiting Frankfurt, Berlin, Prague, Warsaw and London. In each country, officials of the United States Department of State, United States Army and the Economic Cooperation Administration organized for Dean to interview of representatives and country officials.

Dean's book titles include "Europe in Retreat," "The Four Cornerstones of Peace" and "Russia: Menace or Promise?". She focused particularly on United States - Soviet Union relations, writing an influential book "The United States and Russia" in 1946, becoming one of the first experts to decry the Cold War. She was awarded the Jane Addams Medal for Distinguished Service presented by Rockford College in 1954 and the French Legion of Honor.

She was accused of pro-Soviet views in the late 1940s and 1950s. McCarthyists targeted works published by Dean, seeking to remove them from libraries.

=== Academia ===
Dean taught at Harvard University, Barnard College, University of Rochester, and lectured at the University of Paris on American Foreign Policy before settling down at New York University Graduate School of Public Administration. There she became a tenured professor and a senior fellow in the Center for International Studies before retiring in 1971.

== Death ==
She suffered multiple strokes before dying of heart failure and a stroke in New York City in 1972. At the time she was in the middle of writing her autobiography. After her death, Dean's personal papers, including her autobiography, were given to Radcliffe College and are held in Harvard University library archives.
