= Foreign Policy Association =

American non-profit organization

Foreign Policy Association (FPA)
- Type: Non-profit educational/cultural organization
- Founded: 1918; 108 years ago (as League of Free Nations Association); New York City, New York, U.S.
- Headquarters: New York City, New York, U.S.
- Key people: Dr. Noel V. Lateef (CEO)
- Revenue: 4,638,434 United States dollar (2018)
- Total assets: 6,154,230 United States dollar (2022)
- Website: fpa.org

The Foreign Policy Association (FPA, formerly known as the League of Free Nations Association) is an American non-profit foreign policy organization. According to the FPA, the organization aims to spread global awareness and understanding of US foreign policy and global issues by informing, inspiring, and engaging with the public in community and educational forums. As of 2023, the organization's current President & CEO is Noel V. Lateef, who is also the longest serving President of the Foreign Policy Association.

== History ==
=== League of Free Nations Association ===
The FPA was founded in 1918 as the "League of Free Nations Association." Under the chairmanship of journalist Paul Underwood Kellogg, it was formed by 41 Americans to support US President Woodrow Wilson's efforts to achieve a "just peace", with his speech and proposal of the Fourteen Points, which included the idea of a world organization, later to be called the League of Nations. Although the League of Nations ultimately failed, it did help pave the way for the success of the United Nations. The FPA also sought to increase support for United States membership in the world body that was then being discussed and laid out in the Versailles Treaty and the Paris Peace Conference, 1919, with the "Big Four" representatives dominating the many representatives of the nations formerly at war: President Woodrow Wilson of the US, Prime Minister David Lloyd George of the United Kingdom, Premier Georges Clemenceau of France, and Prime Minister Vittorio Emanuele Orlando of Italy following the Armistice ending combat in World War I. It also included future influential Americans from both major political parties, John Foster Dulles and Eleanor Roosevelt.

The United States Senate refused to ratify the Treaty of Versailles and membership of the League of Nations during various debate sessions with votes taken in 1919 and early 1920. Later following the election Republican President Warren G. Harding in the Presidential Election of 1920, the prospect of the US joining the League of Nations vanished. The League of Free Nations Association launched a bulletin in 1920. In 1921 the organisation changed its name to the Foreign Policy Association, and renamed its bulletin the News Bulletin of the Foreign Policy Association.

=== Foreign Policy Association ===
In 1938, a series of lectures on foreign policy aimed towards women called "Off the Record" was launched under the support of the FPA, which later became a non-profit organization of its own in 1938, and now has more than 400 members as of 2023.

In the 1940s, headed by Vera Micheles Dean, the FPA was broadcasting New York City meetings and weekly talks on the program "The World Today" over the National Broadcasting Company's (NBC) radio network. Later, as the discussions among citizens spread, the FPA branches across America began to grow in notoriety and became the forerunners of the various independent membership councils with the World Affairs Councils of America and the foreign affairs or foreign policy councils founded in major large cities or regions of states in the 1950s and 1960s, and some as late as the 1980s.

The FPA's publications, "Foreign Policy Reports" (1925–1951), "Foreign Policy Bulletin" (1920–1961) and "Headline Series" (1935–present) provide analysis of foreign policy issues.

In 1954, the FPAs launched its Great Decisions public education program on international affairs. In the 1960s, the forerunner of the FPA's "Citizen's Guide to U.S. Foreign Policy" was published.

In the 1970s, Great Decisions opinion ballots were tabulated nationally for the first time.

The Foreign Policy Association celebrated its 100th anniversary at a gala held at the Metropolitan Museum of Art in October 2018.

== Media ==
In the effort to help distinguish itself from other non-profit educational and civic organizations in the field of international affairs, the Foreign Policy Association works to engage the public through a variety of different media: Print, Internet and blogs, and television and DVDs.

=== Great Decisions Briefing Book ===
The Great Decisions briefing book features analyses on issues of concern to US policymakers today.

=== Great Decisions Television Series ===
The Foreign Policy Association also produces the Great Decisions series on public television. Great Decisions is produced by Executive Producer MacDara King.

Narrated by David Strathairn, the series features eight half-hour documentaries providing background information, analyses, and debate on issues of concern to US foreign policymakers. The show was narrated by Walter Cronkite. Former guests include Secretary-General of the United Nations Ban Ki-moon, Desmond Tutu, Jimmy Carter, and Madeleine Albright.

=== Foreignpolicyblogs.com ===
Launched in 2007 as part of the "Great Decision" Program, the "Foreign Policy Blogs" network is a network of global affairs commentary "blogs" comprising nearly 50 blogs on a wide variety of global issues ranging from US foreign policy to global feature films/movies. With the "Foreign Policy Blogs" network, the Foreign Policy Association brings to the public, discussion on global affairs to the internet.

The "Foreign Policy Blogs" network is a production of the Foreign Policy Association but is staffed by professional contributors from journalism, academia, business, non-profits and think tanks.

== Programming ==
The Great Decisions program, launched in 1954, is the flagship educational program at the core of its outreach.

The Foreign Policy Association organizes educational programs such as the Great Decisions discussion groups and workshops. FPA's national network of volunteer coordinators help implementing the Great Decisions program by setting up discussion groups, seminars, and public forums in which participants meet, discuss, and reach informed opinions on each topic.

To facilitate the programming, the FPA produces the weekly e-newsletters, "Great Decisions Online" and "Great Decisions in the Classroom," written for Great Decisions participants and educators. The organization makes a map of all the various discussion groups across the US available and encourages individuals to start groups of their own.

=== Teacher Training ===
Working to increase Great Decisions participation among high school students, FPA conducts outreach to hundreds of high school teachers from around the United States at meetings of the National Council for the Social Studies. Through Great Decisions workshop presentations and exhibitor booths, educators learn about FPA's programming and receive samples of the Great Decisions educational materials.

In addition to the general outreach, the Foreign Policy Association organizes "Great Decisions Teacher Training Institutes". Here, secondary school teachers learn about the Great Decisions programming materials and resources to explore ways to integrate Great Decisions in the classroom curricula.

== Events ==
Since the launch of the luncheon series in the 1920s, the Foreign Policy Association has invited experts to discuss global affairs issues with the public. Aside from the recurrent annual events such as the Annual FPA Dinner, the "World Leadership Forum," and the "International Business Forum," it also organizes events such as "Town Hall" meetings, lectures, luncheon discussions, and open forums with world leaders and experts in the New York City metropolitan area.
