= Crypto-fascism =

Hidden support for fascist ideology

Crypto-fascism is the secret support or admiration of fascism or of associated trends. The term is used to imply that an individual or a group keeps this support or admiration hidden in an attempt to avoid political persecution or political suicide. A person, an organization or an idea which possesses this tendency would be described as "crypto-fascist". Alternatively, the term can be used in reference to individuals or organizations which operate in a democratic framework but espouse fascist beliefs or ideologies which are politically close to fascism.

== Origin ==
In an ABC television debate during the 1968 Democratic National Convention, Gore Vidal described William F. Buckley Jr. as a "sort of pro or crypto-Nazi". Buckley responded, "Now listen you queer, stop calling me a crypto-Nazi or I'll sock you in the goddamn face, and you'll stay plastered." Vidal later clarified in an essay published in Esquire in 1969, "I had not intended to use the phrase 'pro crypto Nazi.' 'Fascist-minded' was more my intended meaning". In later reporting on this event, the term Vidal used to describe Buckley was sometimes misquoted as "crypto-fascist".

The term "crypto-fascist" had first appeared in print five years earlier in a German-language book by the sociologist Theodor W. Adorno, German: Der getreue Korrepetitor, lit. 'The Faithful Répétiteur'. Adorno had used "crypto-fascism" as early as 1937 in a letter written to Walter Benjamin. In this document, the term is not linked to secret support or admiration of fascism but it is used to refer to someone who is insufficiently conscious when displaying such regressive tendencies.

== Usage ==
The term was used by German Nobel laureate Heinrich Böll in a 1972 essay titled "Will Ulrike Gnade oder freies Geleit?" ("Does Ulrike want mercy or safe passage?") that was sharply critical of the tabloid newspaper Bild's coverage of the Baader-Meinhof Gang left-wing terrorist organization. In the essay, Böll stated that what Bild does "is no longer crypto-fascist, no longer fascistoid, that is naked fascism. Incitement, lies, filth."

In the 1989 Red Dwarf episode "Timeslides", the lead character Lister goes back in time to meet up with his younger self in order to make himself rich. His younger self calls his older self a Crypto-Fascist.

In a 2011 article for The Guardian, Rick Moody suggested that "mainstream Hollywood cinema" and specifically comic book artist and film director Frank Miller are "crypto-fascist" because they promote the view that "war against a ruthless enemy is good, and military service is good, that killing makes you a man, that capitalism must prevail."

The game Disco Elysium has a minor character that the text in-game calls a Crypto-Fascist. The protagonist, a police detective, can also choose to espouse fascist ideals over the course of the game. If he agrees to stop openly discussing said views while conducting police work after a verbal confrontation with his partner, he will refer to the protagonist as a Crypto-Fascist in a later conversation.

With alternative meaning of the prefix "crypto", similar to its use in "crypto-anarchy", the term "crypto-fascism" has also been used to refer to the embracing of cryptocurrency by overt fascists and the association of cryptocurrency with its use by the far right.

== See also ==
- Para-fascism
- Post-fascism
- Clerical fascism
- Neo-fascism
- Crypto-communism
- Fellow traveller
- Nippon Kaigi
- Ecofascism
- Ghost skin
- National Party – Greeks
