= Longman–History Today Awards =

The Longman–History Today Awards is the name of an annual awards ceremony, run by Longman and History Today magazine, in which prizes are presented in various categories "to promote the study, publication and accessibility of history to a wide audience." The awards, given in memory of one of the founding editors of History Today, Sir Peter Quennell, are announced at a gala event in London each January.

The award categories are:

- The Trustees Award: given to a person or organisation that has done most to promote history over the last year or years.
- Book of the Year: given for an author’s first or second book.
- Picture Researcher of the Year: given to a researcher who has done outstanding work to enhance a text with the creative, imaginative and wide-ranging selection of appropriate images.
- Undergraduate Dissertation of the Year: for the best dissertation presented by a final-year undergraduate at a British university.

== Past winners ==
(note: in 2012 the decision was made to rename the awards for the year in which they are given. Hence, there is no award for 2011).

The awards were apparently discontinued after 2019, though no formal announcement appears to have been made.

=== 2019 ===
Prize	Winner	Runner-up	Highly commended
The Trustees Award	Claire Breay (head of Ancient, Medieval and Early Modern Manuscripts at the British Library)		
Book of the Year Award	Our Boys: The Story of a Paratrooper by Helen Parr (Allen Lane)		
Undergraduate Dissertation Prize	Ella Sbaraini (Clare College, Cambridge) for Rethinking Middle-Aged Women's Sexuality in England, 1700-1815		

=== 2018 ===
Prize	Winner	Runner-up	Highly commended
The Trustees Award	In Our Time (radio documentary series)		
Book of the Year Award	Edmund Burke & the Invention of Modern Convervatism, 1830-1914 by Emily Jones (Oxford University Press)		
Undergraduate Dissertation Prize	Abigail Greenall (University of Manchester) for Magical Materials and Emotion in the Early Modern East Anglian Household		

=== 2017 ===
Prize	Winner	Runner-up	Highly commended
The Trustees Award	David Olusoga (historian and broadcaster)		
Book of the Year Award	Æthelred the Unready by Levi Roach (Yale University Press)		
Historical Picture Researcher of the Year	Pauline Hubner (for Huw Lewis-Jones and Kari Kerbert's Sketchbooks: The Art of Discovery and Adventure)		
Undergraduate Dissertation Prize	Emma Marshall (University of Durham) for Women's Domestic Medical Practice: Recipe Writing and Knowledge Networks in 17th Century England		

=== 2016 ===
Prize	Winner	Runner-up	Highly commended
The Trustees Award	David Cesarani (historian of the Holocaust; posthumous award)		
Book of the Year Award	If This Is a Woman—Inside Ravensbruck: Hitler's Concentration Camp for Women by Sarah Helm (Little Brown)		
Historical Picture Researcher of the Year	Maria Ranuro (for Alexandra Harris's Weatherland: Writers and Artists Under English Skies)		

=== 2015 ===
Prize	Winner	Runner-up	Highly commended
The Trustees Award	Commonwealth War Graves Commission		
Book of the Year Award	London Calling: the BBC World Service and the Cold War by Alban Webb (Bloomsbury)		
Historical Picture Researcher of the Year	Laura Canter (for the Folio Society's edition of Paul Fussell's The Great War and Modern Memory)		
Digital History Award	Eleanor Parker (for her website "A Clerk of Oxford")		
Undergraduate Dissertation Prize	Rebecca Pyne-Edwards Banks (University of Derby) for Cutting Through the Gordian Knot: The British Military Service Tribunals During the Great War		

=== 2014 ===
Prize	Winner	Runner-up	Highly commended
The Trustees Award	Norman Davies (Professor Emeritus, University College London)		
Book of the Year Award	Empire of Secrets: British Intelligence, the Cold War and the Twilight of Empire by Calder Walton (Harper Press)		
Historical Picture Researcher of the Year	Cathie Arrington (for the Folio Society's edition of Galileo Galilei's Dialogue Concerning the Two Chief World Systems)		
Digital History Award	Historypin		
Undergraduate Dissertation Prize	Anna Field (Cardiff University) for Masculinity and Myth: the Highway-woman in Early Modern England		

=== 2013 ===
Prize	Winner	Runner-up	Highly commended
The Trustees Award	Pevsner Architectural Guides, published by Yale University Press.		
Book of the Year Award	Memories of Empire. Vol. I The White Man’s World by Bill Schwarz (Oxford University Press)		
Historical Picture Researcher of the Year	Pauline Hubner (for The Great Builders by Kenneth Powell)		
Undergraduate Dissertation Prize	Frederick Smith (University of Durham) for Discerning Cheese from Chalke: Louvainist Propaganda and Recusant Identity in 1560s England		

=== 2012 ===
Prize	Winner	Runner-up	Highly commended
The Trustees Award	Professor Gordon Campbell (University of Leicester)		
Book of the Year Award	Evening’s Empire: A History of the Night in Early Modern Europe by Craig Koslofsky (Cambridge University Press)		
Historical Picture Researcher of the Year	Caroline Hotblack (for Black Sea by Neal Ascherson) and Cecilia Mackay (for Crimea by Orlando Figes)		
Undergraduate Dissertation Prize	Richard Lowe-Lauri (University of Durham) for The Decline of the Stamford Bull-Running c. 1788-1840		

=== 2010 ===
Prize	Winner	Runner-up	Highly commended
The Trustees Award	Professor Tim Hitchcock (University of Hertfordshire) and Professor Robert Shoemaker (University of Sheffield) for The Old Bailey Proceedings Online and London Lives.		
Book of the Year Award	Demobbed: Coming Home After the Second World War by Alan Allport (Yale University Press)	Pashas: Traders and Travellers in the Islamic World by James Mather (Yale University Press)	Matters of the Heart: History Medicine and Emotion by Fay Bound Alberti (Oxford University Press); Selling Sex in the Reich: Prostitutes in German Society, 1914-45 by Victoria Harris (Oxford University Press); Bomber County: The Lost Airmen of World War Two by Daniel Swift (Hamish Hamilton)
Historical Picture Researcher of the Year	Julie McMahon (for Stalingrad by Antony Beevor)	Steve Behan (for The Battle of Britain by Richard Overy)	
Undergraduate Dissertation Prize	Alexander Baggallay (University of Edinburgh) for Myths of Mau Mau Expanded: The Role of Rehabilitation in Detention Camps During the State of Emergency in Kenya, 1954-1960	David Kenrick (University of Liverpool) for Identity and the Politics of Survival: White Rhodesia, 1965-1980	

=== 2009 ===
Prize	Winner
The Trustees Award	Diarmaid MacCulloch
Book of the Year Award	Hot Flushes, Cold Science: A History of the Modern Menopause by Louise Foxcroft (Granta)
Historical Picture Researcher of the Year	Alice Foster and Sally Paley (for Shakespeare’s London on Five Groats a Day by Richard Tames (Thames & Hudson))
Undergraduate Dissertation Prize	Eleanor Betts (Queen Mary, University of London) for Who Will Help? The Impact of the 1866 Cholera Epidemic on the Children of East London

=== 2008 ===
Prize	Winner	Runner-up	Highly commended
The Trustees Award	Simon Jenkins		
Book of the Year Award	The Forsaken: From the Great Depression to the Gulags – Hope and Betrayal in Stalin’s Russia by Tim Tzouliadis	The Pain and the Privilege: The Women in Lloyd George’s Life by Ffion Hague; Pilgrims: New World Settlers and the Call of Home by Susan Hardman Moore	War in England, 1642-1649 by Barbara Donagan; Richard II: Manhood, Youth and Politics by Christopher Fletcher; The Jewel House: Elizabethan London and the Scientific Revolution by Deborah E. Harkness; Blessed Days of Anaesthesia: How Anaesthetics Changed the World by Stephanie J. Snow
Historical Picture Researcher of the Year	Melanie Haselden (for Going Dutch: How England Plundered Holland’s Glory by Lisa Jardine)		Caroline Wood (for A History of Herbert Smith by Tom Philips); Alice Foster (for Discovery! Unearthing the New Treasures of Archaeology ed. Professor Brian M. Fagan)
Undergraduate Dissertation Prize	Catherine Martin, University of Greenwich		Katherine McMullen, Oxford University; Robbie Maxwell, University of Edinburgh

=== 2007 ===
Award	Winner	Highly commended
The Trustees Award	William Hague	
Book of the Year Award	Life on Air: A History of Radio 4 by David Hendy	Nazis and the Cinema by Susan Tegel; God’s Architect: Pugin and the Building of Romantic Britain by Rosemary Hill; Mrs Woolf and the Servants: The Hidden Heart of Domestic Service by Alison Light
Picture Research Award	Juliet Brightmore (for A Little History of the English Country Church by Roy Strong)	
Undergraduate Dissertation Prize	Morgan Daniels, Queen Mary, University of London	Liz Homans, University of Wales, Bangor; Dmitri Levitin, Selwyn College, Cambridge
Local History Project Award	Unheard Stories	

== See also ==
- List of history awards
