= The Great Terror (book) =

1968 book by Robert Conquest

- Cover of The Great Terror: A Reassessment, the 1990 revised version of the book
- Authors: Robert Conquest
- Original title: The Great Terror: Stalin's Purge of the Thirties
- Language: English
- Subjects: Great Purge; Stalin era
- Publisher: Oxford University Press
- Publication date: 1968
- Publication place: United Kingdom
- Media type: Print
- Pages: 584 (first edition)
- ISBN: 9780195055801

The Great Terror: Stalin's Purge of the Thirties is a book by British historian Robert Conquest which was published in 1968.

One of the first books by a Western writer to discuss the Great Purge in the Soviet Union, it was based mainly on information which had been made public, either officially or by individuals, during the Khrushchev Thaw in the period 1956–1964, and on an analysis of official documents such as the Soviet census. Many of The Great Terror’s primary sources were Information Research Department materials, which the agency used to shape political consensus in its favor. It also drew on accounts by Russian and Ukrainian émigrés and exiles dating back to the 1930s. The book was well received in the popular press and was read widely among dissidents in the Soviet Union, but its estimates started a debate among historians. Conquest defended his higher estimates of 20 million, which are supported by some historians and other authors in the popular press, while other historians said that even his reassessments were still too high and are considerably less than originally thought.

It gave rise to an alternate title of the period in Soviet history known as the Great Purge. Conquest's title was also an allusion to the period that was called the Reign of Terror during the French Revolution (French: la Terreur and from June to July 1794 la Grande Terreur, "the Great Terror"). A revised version of the book, called The Great Terror: A Reassessment, was printed in 1990 after Conquest was able to amend the text, having consulted the opened Soviet archives.

== Synopsis ==
The first critical inquiry into the Great Purge outside the Soviet Union had been made as early as 1937 by the Dewey Commission, which published its findings in the form of a 422-page book entitled Not Guilty (this title referred to the people who had been charged with various crimes by Joseph Stalin's government and therefore purged); the Dewey Commission found them not guilty. The most important aim of Conquest's The Great Terror was to widen the understanding of the purges beyond the previous narrow focus on the Moscow Trials of disgraced All-Union Communist Party (Bolsheviks) leaders, such as Nikolai Bukharin and Grigory Zinoviev. The question of why these leaders had pleaded guilty and confessed to various crimes at the trials had become a topic of discussion for a number of Western writers and had underlain books, such as George Orwell's Nineteen Eighty-Four and Arthur Koestler's Darkness at Noon. According to the book, the trials and executions of these former Communist leaders were a minor detail of the purges, which together with man-made famines had led to 20 million deaths according to his estimates. In the appendix of the original 1968 edition, Conquest estimated that 700,000 legal executions took place during 1937 and 1938, which was roughly confirmed by the 681,692 executions found in the Soviet archives for these two years. In the preface to the 40th anniversary edition of The Great Terror, Conquest wrote that he had been "correct on the vital matter—the numbers put to death: about one million" but lowered other figures, saying that the total number of deaths brought about by the various Soviet terror campaigns "can hardly be lower than some 13 to 15 million."

In the book, Conquest disputed the assertion made by Nikita Khrushchev and supported by many Western leftists, namely that Stalin and his purges were an aberration from the ideals of the October Revolution and were contrary to the principles of Leninism. Conquest posited that Stalinism was a natural consequence of the system established by Vladimir Lenin, although he conceded that the personal character traits of Stalin had brought about the particular horrors of the late 1930s. Neal Ascherson wrote: "Everyone by then could agree that Stalin was a very wicked man and a very evil one, but we still wanted to believe in Lenin; and Conquest said that Lenin was just as bad and that Stalin was simply carrying out Lenin's programme." Conquest sharply criticized Western intellectuals for what he described as their blindness towards the realities of the Soviet Union, both in the 1930s and in some cases even in the 1960s. He described figures, such as Beatrice Webb and Sidney Webb, George Bernard Shaw, Jean-Paul Sartre, Walter Duranty, Bernard Pares, Harold Laski, Denis Pritt, Theodore Dreiser, and Romain Rolland, as dupes of Stalin and apologists for his regime for denying, excusing, or justifying various aspects of the purges. A widespread story recounts that when he was asked to provide a new title for an anniversary edition, after his initial findings were verified by the opened Soviet archives, Conquest allegedly replied: "How about I Told You So, You Fucking Fools?" According to Conquest, this never happened and was a joking invention of writer Kingsley Amis.

== Reception, impact, and debates ==
The Great Terror was the first comprehensive research of the Great Purge, which took place in the Soviet Union between 1934 and 1939 according to Conquest. Many aspects of his book remain disputed by Sovietologist historians and researchers on Russian and Soviet history. Many reviewers at the time were not impressed by his way of writing about the Great Terror, which was in the tradition of great men history, and attributed state violence to Stalin as a “master plotter." In 1995, investigative journalist Paul Lashmar suggested that the reputation of prominent academics such as Conquest was built upon work derived from material provided by the Information Research Department. In 1996, historian Eric Hobsbawm praised The Great Terror as "a remarkable pioneer effort to assess the Stalin Terror" but said that this work and others were now obsolete "simply because the archival sources are now available." According to Denis Healey, The Great Terror was an important influence, "but one which confirmed people in their views rather than converted them."

After the dissolution of the Soviet Union and the opening up of the Soviet archives, Conquest's estimates of death tolls and other aspects of his research were challenged by several historians, including J. Arch Getty, Gábor T. Rittersporn, Hobsbawm, and Vadim Rogovin. Michael Ellman and Getty in particular criticised Conquest for relying on hearsay and rumour as evidence, and cautioned that historians should instead utilize archive material. Ellman distinguished between historians who base their research on archive materials, and those like Conquest whose estimates are based on witnesses evidence and other data that is unreliable. Historian Stephen G. Wheatcroft said that Conquest's victim totals for Stalinist repressions are too high, even in his reassessments. Wheatcroft stated that historians relied on Aleksandr Solzhenitsyn to support their estimates of deaths under Stalin in the tens of millions but research in the state archives vindicated the lower estimates, while adding that the popular press has continued to include serious errors that should not be cited, or relied on, in academia. Historian Timothy D. Snyder wrote that it is still taken for granted that Stalin killed more people than Adolf Hitler but the estimates of 6–9 million for the Stalin regime are considerably less than originally thought, while those for Nazi Germany are higher and in line with previous estimates.

Other historians, such as Stéphane Courtois and Steven Rosefielde, agree with Conquest and maintain their original, higher estimates, while Robert Gellately put more recent estimates at 10–20 million. Among other authors published by the popular press who agree with Conquest's estimates are Stalin biographer Simon Sebag Montefiore, perestroika architect and former head of the Presidential Committee for the Rehabilitation of Victims of Political Repression Alexander Nikolaevich Yakovlev, and the director of Yale University's Annals of Communism series Jonathan Brent. Historian Dmitri Volkogonov, who was special adviser for defence issues to the Russian president Boris Yeltsin until 1994, is also broadly in agreement with Conquest. In 1997, Conquest stated: "We are all inclined to accept the Zemskov totals (even if not as complete) with their 14 million intake to Gulag 'camps' alone, to which must be added 4–5 million going to Gulag 'colonies', to say nothing of the 3.5 million already in, or sent to, 'labour settlements'. However taken, these are surely 'high' figures." In the preface to the 40th anniversary edition of The Great Terror (2007), Conquest wrote: "Exact numbers may never be known with complete certainty, but the total of deaths caused by the whole range of Soviet regime's terrors can hardly be lower than some fifteen million."

== Publication history ==
The 1968 first edition begins with a Preface, and closes with seven Appendices and a "Biographical Note".

It was published in 1971 by Penguin under their "Pelican" imprint, with an additional Preface.

A "Revised Edition" was published in 1973, retaining the prefaces and adding a third, "Preface to the Present Edition". This edition also adds an "Addendum".

It was republished in 1990 with a new Preface. The Appendices and Biographical Note are removed. The text was substantially revised, and the Epilogue ("Heritage of Terror", revised) has a second section, "The Terror Today".

The 1990 edition was reissued in 2008 as the "40th anniversary" edition, with a new Introduction.

The "50th anniversary" edition was published in 2018, after Conquest's death, with a Foreword by Anne Applebaum, and keeping the 2007/8 Introduction. There is a new Acknowledgements section at the end, between the notes and the bibliography, and an "Additional select bibliography for 2008 edition".

== See also ==
- Soviet and Communist studies
- Stalin: Breaker of Nations
- Stalin: Paradoxes of Power, 1878–1928 by Stephen Kotkin
- Stalin: Waiting for Hitler, 1929–1941 by Stephen Kotkin

== Sources ==
- Brent, Jonathan (2008). Inside the Stalin Archives: Discovering the New Russia (PDF) (hardcover ed.). Fayetteville, North Carolina: Atlas Books. ISBN 9780977743339. Archived from the original (PDF) on 24 February 2009 – via Atlas & Co. See also the 2008 edition via Google Books.
- Brown, Andrew (15 February 2003). "Scourge and Poet". The Guardian. London, England.
- Conquest, Robert (November 1997). "Victims of Stalinism: A Comment" (PDF). Europe-Asia Studies. 49 (7). London, England: Routledge: 1317–1319. doi:10.1080/09668139708412501. JSTOR 154087 – via Soviet Studies.
- Conquest, Robert (12 April 2007). "Kingsley Amis and 'The Great Terror'". The New York Review of Books. New York City, New York.
- Courtois, Stéphane; et al. (Bartosek, Karel; Margolin, Jean-Louis Paczkowski, Andrzej; Panné, Jean-Louis; Werth, Nicolas) (1999) [1997]. The Black Book of Communism: Crimes, Terror Repression (hardcover ed.). Cambridge, Massachusetts: Harvard University Press. ISBN 9780674076082 – via Google Books.
- Defty, Andrew (2013). Britain, America and Anti-Communist Propaganda 1945–53: The Information Research Department (E-book ed.). London, England: Routledge. ISBN 9781317791690.
- Ellman, Michael (November 2002). "Soviet Repression Statistics: Some Comments" (PDF). Europe-Asia Studies. 54 (7). London, England: Routledge: 1152–1172. doi:10.1080/0966813022000017177. JSTOR 826310. S2CID 43510161 – via Soviet Studies.
- Gellately, Robert (2007). Lenin, Stalin, and Hitler: The Age of Social Catastrophe (hardcover ed.). Alfred A. Knopf. ISBN 9781400040056 – via Google Booksto the 2012 Random House edition.
- Getty, J. Arch (1985). Origins of the Great Purges: The Soviet Communist Party Reconsidered, 1933–1938. Translated by Choate, Frederick S. (illustrated ed.). New York City, New York: Cambridge University Press. ISBN 9780521335706 – via Google Books.
- Hobsbawm, Eric (2011). "Can We Write the History of the Russian Revolution". On History (E-book ed.). London, England: Hachette UK. ISBN 9781780220512 – via Google Books.
- Montefiore, Simon Sebag (2005). Stalin: The Court of the Red Tsar (paperback ed.). New York City, New York. ISBN 9781400076789 – via Google Books.
- Rappaport, Helen (1999). Joseph Stalin: A Biographical Companion (illustrated, commented ed.). Santa Barbara, California: ABC-CLIO. ISBN 9781576070840 – via Google Books.
- Rittersporn, Gábor (1991). Stalinist Simplifications and Soviet Complications, 1933–1953 (illustrated ed.). New York City, New York: Harwood Academic Publishers. ISBN 9783718651078 – via Google Books.
- Rogovin, Vadim (1998). 1937: Year of Terror. Oak Park, Michigan: Mehring Books. ISBN 9780929087771 – via Google Books.
- Rosefielde, Steven (2009). Red Holocaust (paperback ed.). London, England: Routledge. ISBN 9780415777575 – via Google Books.
- Samuelson, Lennart (2009). "A Pathbreaker. Robert Conquest and Soviet Studies During the Cold War". Baltic Worlds. II (1). Flemingsberg, Sweden: Centre for Baltic and East European Studies: 47–51 – via Balticworlds.com on 17 February 2010.
- Snyder, Timothy D. (2010). Bloodlands: Europe Between Hitler and Stalin (Kindle ed.). New York City, New York: Basic Books. ISBN 9780465002399 – via Internet Archive. See also the 2012 paperback edition via Google Books.
- Snyder, Timothy D. (10 March 2011). "Hitler vs. Stalin: Who Killed More?". The New York Review of Books. New York City, New York.
- Taylor, D. J. (6 November 2002). "Obituary: Celia Goodman". The Guardian. London, England.
- Volkogonov, Dmitri (1998). Autopsy for an Empire: The Seven Leaders Who Built the Soviet Regime (1st paperback ed.). New York City, New York: Free Press. ISBN 0684834200 – via Internet Archive. See also the 1999 paperback edition published by Touchstone Books via Google Books.
- Wheatcroft, Stephen G. (March 1999). "Victims of Stalinism and the Soviet Secret Police: The Comparability and Reliability of the Archival Data. Not the Last Word" (PDF). Europe-Asia Studies. 51 (2). London, England: Routledge: 340–342. doi:10.1080/09668139999056. JSTOR 153614 – via Soviet Studies.
- Wheatcroft, Stephen G. (September 2000). "The Scale and Nature of Stalinist Repression and its Demographic Significance: On Comments by Keep and Conquest" (PDF). Europe-Asia Studies. 52 (6). London, England: Routledge: 1143–1159. doi:10.1080/09668130050143860. JSTOR 153593. PMID 19326595. S2CID 205667754 – via Soviet Studies.
- Williamson, Marcus (5 August 2015). "Robert Conquest: Revered historian and poet who was the first to catalogue the full horrors of the Stalinist purges of the 1930s". The Independent. London, England.
- Yakovlev, Alexander Nikolaevich; et al. (Hollander, Paul) (2002). A Century of Violence in Soviet Russia. Translated by Austin, Anthony (hardcover ed.). New Haven, Connecticut: Yale University Press. ISBN 9780300103229 – via Google Books.

== Bibliography ==
- Conquest, Robert (1968). The Great Terror: Stalin's Purge of the Thirties (1st print ed.). Oxford, England: Oxford University Press. ISBN 9780195055801 – via Google Booksto the 1968 Penguin edition. See also the 1968 Macmillan edition via the Internet Archive.
- Conquest, Robert (1990). The Great Terror: A Reassessment (1st hardcover ed.). Oxford, England: Oxford University Press. ISBN 9780195055801 – via Google Booksto the 1990 Hutchinson edition.
- Conquest, Robert (1991). The Great Terror: A Reassessment (1st trade paperback ed.). Oxford, England: Oxford University Press. ISBN 9780195071320 – via Google Books.
- Conquest, Robert (2007) [1991]. The Great Terror: A Reassessment (40th Anniversary hardcover ed.). Oxford: Oxford University Press. ISBN 9780195316995 – via Google Books.
- Conquest, Robert (2008) [1991]. The Great Terror: A Reassessment (reprint ed.). Oxford: Oxford University Press. ISBN 9780195316995 – via Google Books.
