= Stalin: Breaker of Nations =

1991 biography of Joseph Stalin

- Book cover for Stalin: Breaker of Nations by Robert Conquest
- Author: Robert Conquest
- Language: English
- Subject: Joseph Stalin, History of the Soviet Union, Stalinism.
- Genre: History
- Published: 1991
- Publisher: Penguin Random House (print), Blackstone Audio (audiobook)
- Publication place: United States
- Media type: Print, audiobook
- Pages: 346 pp., Penguin Random House, 1st hardcover edition (1991); 15 hours and 39 minutes, Blackstone Audio edition (1992).
- ISBN: 978-0297811947
- Website: Penguin Random House

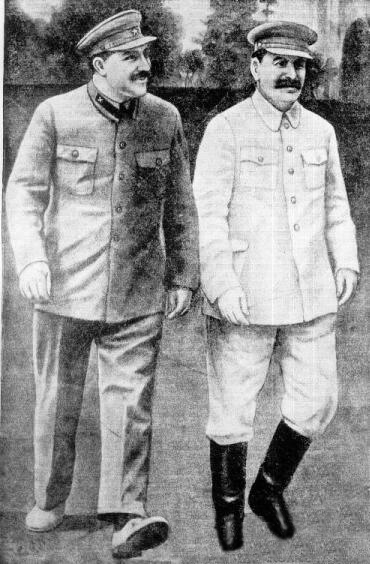
Stalin with Kaganovich during the Holodomor

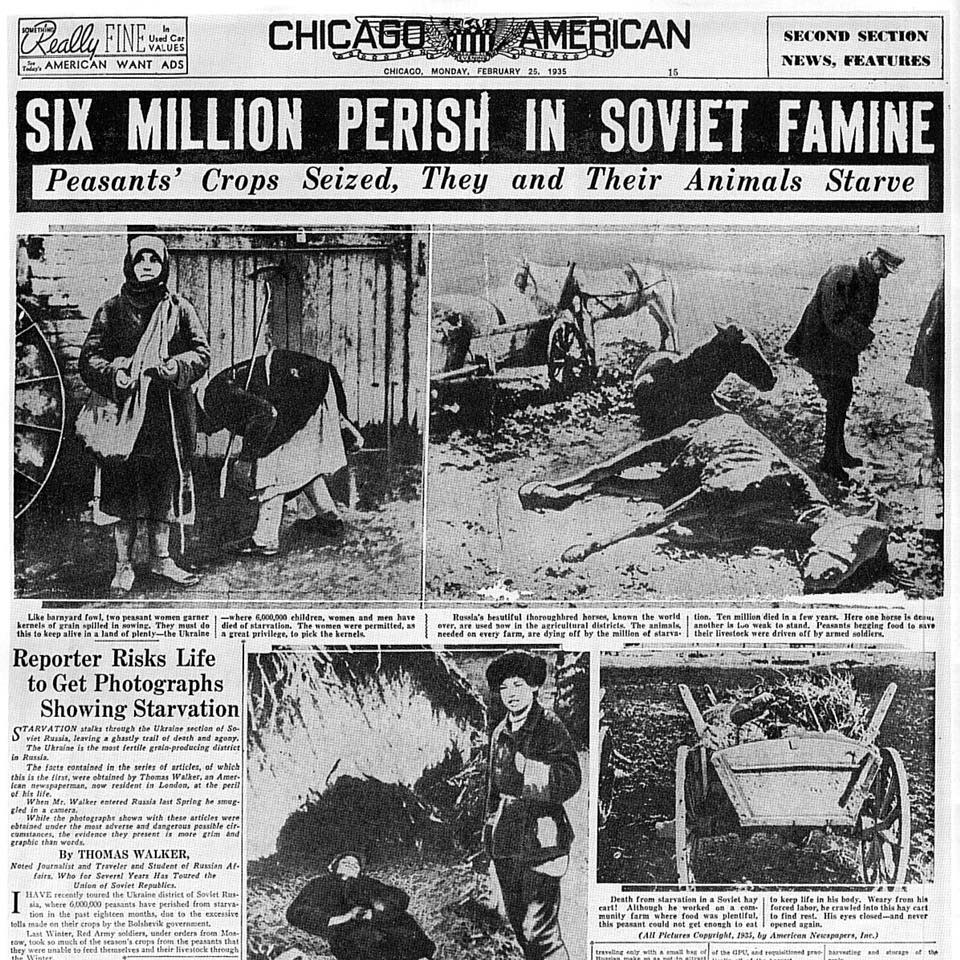
Newspaper reporting the famine in Ukraine

Stalin: Breaker of Nations is a biography of Joseph Stalin by author and historian Robert Conquest. It was published in 1991 by Weidenfeld and Nicolson and Penguin Books.

Conquest’s popular history can be placed within the Totalitarian School of Soviet historiography, attributing historical events like the Great Purge and the Katyn Massacre to Stalin’s individual personal and political goals, as well as his psychological state. This philosophy can also be described as "Great Man Theory."

== Synopsis ==
Both a personal and political biography, Stalin: Breaker of Nations traces the path of Stalin's life from his childhood and youth in Gori, Georgia and the time he spent in a seminary in Tiflis, until his death. Although it contains a great deal of information about Stalin personally, Conquest focuses mainly on the political aspects of Stalin's career: his political education under Lenin as a ruthless revolutionary, leader, and communist thinker; the horrors of Soviet agricultural collectivization; the mass bloodshed during the Great Terror; the Nazi-Soviet pact and the Nazi-Soviet war; and finally, the anti-Semitic campaign which immediately preceded his death. The book concludes with a chapter summarizing Stalin's legacy as of 1991. Stalin viewed through the lens of glastnost is a constant theme in this work, as it was in the author's preceding 1990 book, The Great Terror: A Reassessment.

Conquest focuses on three main reasons why Stalin was able to seize and maintain power through a variety of ever-changing coalitions of New Bolsheviks. First, he was a master at twisting Marxist and Leninist theory to fit his aims and defeat or sway the Old Bolsheviks. Second, his opponents miscalculated the amount of support Stalin was able to muster among New Bolsheviks, who hadn't had a prior relationship with Lenin and his followers. Finally, Stalin was committed to the idea of never-ending struggle; he could literally exhaust and eventually murder his opponents who did not thrive on constant conflict. Stalin is quoted as saying, "Death solves all problems, no man, no problem." Destruction was Stalin's ultimate weapon of the struggle; against his personal opponents and against the people he ruled over. J. Arch Getty writes in Slavic Review, "we find in Stalin: Breaker of Nations some quite interesting allusions to environmental and social factors in Soviet history. Conquest is right when he points to the inability of partially educated, categorical-minded bolshevik politicians to comprehend social reality. Their narrow faith in a particular kind of nineteenth-century science made it difficult for them to distinguish between fact and fantasy."

The book is relatively short for a subject as large as the life of Stalin, but ultimately the author is able to summarize Stalin's life, the horrors he inflicted on the Soviet people, and the means in which he achieved and maintained power.

== About the author ==
Robert Conquest was a well known and highly regarded popular historian of the Soviet Union, particularly the Stalinist period. He was a Senior Research Fellow at the Hoover Institution for 28 years and received the Presidential Medal of Freedom in 2005.

Writing about the author and this work, well known Soviet historian Richard Pipes (Note: Some of Richard Pipe's notable works on Russia are: The Russian Revolution (1990), Russia Under the Bolshevik Regime: 1919–1924 (1993), and A Concise History of the Russian Revolution(1995).) writes: "Mr. Conquest is without peer in the knowledge of Soviet history of the 1930's. He has supreme command of the sources, including those currently being released from Soviet archives. The byzantine intrigues by means of which Stalin, having transformed the country into his private domain, subjected the Soviet Union to experiments that were as cruel as they were senseless are told succinctly..."

== Reception ==
Writing about what makes Stalin: Breaker of Nations unique among the vast number of Stalin biographies, J. Arch Getty (Note: Some of J. Arch Getty's notable works on Russia are: Stalinist Terror: New Perspectives (1993), Origins of the Great Purges: The Soviet Communist Party Reconsidered, 1933-1938 (1996), The Road to Terror: Stalin and the Self-Destruction of the Bolsheviks, 1932-1939(1999), and Practicing Stalinism: Bolsheviks, Boyars, and the Persistence of Tradition (2013).) writes,

Yet, despite the unending stream of Stalin biographies, Stalin: Breaker of Nations fills an important niche. Until now, we have not had a serious, readable treatment aimed at a popular audience. Previous attempts to produce such for a non-specialist audience have foundered either because they were ponderously long and tedious, or because omission of a scholarly apparatus led to semi-fictional stories based more on imagination than fact. Robert Conquest has managed to avoid these pitfalls and has produced a highly readable, manageable book, accessible both to non-Russianist scholars and the general public.

Getty commented further that Conquest's biography "displays a kind of interpretive distinction from some of the author's earlier works. Although Conquest has by no means gone soft on communism, the book is short on the repeated manichean characterizations of communism-as-evil that his earlier books used almost as an explanatory vehicle." He also praises Conquest's writing style as deft and polished.

He criticises Conquest's presentation as facts claims that there is still significant academic disagreement, such as labelling the 1932 famine as an intentional genocide and the death of Sergei Kirov as planned murder, Conquest's use of memoirs, stating that Conquest's description of Boris Bazhanov's memoirs as "very useful but not always authentic", "makes one wonder whether we can pick and choose the memories we like (or the rumors most often repeated) and discard the inconvenient ones." and points out that in Alexander Orlov's memoirs, he reported the existence of an imminent military coup on Stalin in 1937, which like in Bazhanov's claim that Stalin murdered Kirov, were both heard second-hand, and labels Conquest's choice of language in certain areas as "incautious", like the suggestion that "Stalin's antipathy toward Poles may have resulted "from their failure to let him defeat them at Lwow in 1920." or calling the pro-FDR American politicians as having displayed "selective sanctimoniousness... even more repulsive than their political stupidity." But ultimately, Getty states that "Even with its flaws, this book is the best short popular biography of Stalin."

Robert Legvold (Note: Some of Robert Legvold's notable works on Russia are: Return to Cold War (2016), Russian Foreign Policy in the Twenty-First Century and the Shadow of the Past (2007), and Thinking Strategically: The Major Powers, Kazakhstan, and the Central Asian Nexus (2003).) writes in Foreign Policy,

A graceful, evocative and compact biography, written by a long-time student of this man and his heroic, sad, too often awful times. Neither in explaining Stalin nor in probing the "ism" to which he gave rise does the book break fundamentally new ground. But it does incorporate new material from recent years into what is the most readable and accessible portrait available of a figure who still haunts his tortured land.

Academic journals

- D'Agostino, A. (1995). Stalin Old and New. The Russian Review, 54(3), 447–451.
- Getty, J. (1993). Review: Stalin: Breaker of Nations Slavic Review, 52(4), 914–915.
- Legvold, R. (1992). Reviewed Work: Stalin: Breaker of Nations by Robert Conquest Foreign Affairs, 71(2), 205-205.

Popular media

- Pipes, Richard (November 10, 1991). "Book Review: Stalin Breaker of Nations". The New York Times.
- Simms, Gayle (March 8, 1998). "Review: Stalin Breaker of Nations". The Philadelphia Inquirer. p. 194.
- Trully, Pat (November 24, 1991). "Book Review: Stalin Breaker of Nations". Fort Worth Star Telegram. p. 72.
- Walker, Martin (November 24, 1991). "Genghis Khan With A Telegraph". Washington Post.

== See also ==
- Bibliography of Stalinism and the Soviet Union
- Mass killings under Communist regimes
- Stalin: Paradoxes of Power, 1878-1928 by Stephen Kotkin
- Stalin: Waiting for Hitler, 1929-1941 by Stephen Kotkin
