= Robert Conquest =

British-American historian and poet (1917–2015)

Robert Conquest CMG OBE FBA FRSL
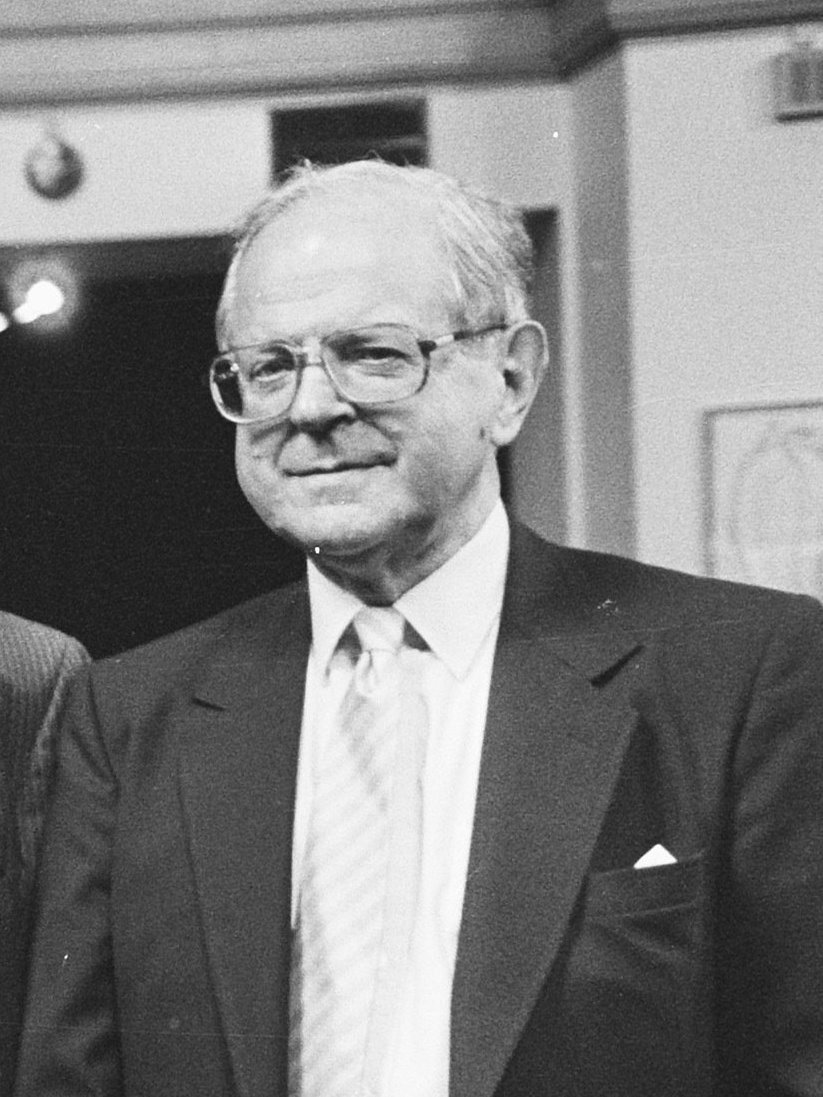
- Conquest in 1987
- Born: George Robert Acworth Conquest; 15 July 1917; Great Malvern, Worcestershire, England
- Died: 3 August 2015 (aged 98); Stanford, California, U.S.
- Citizenship: United Kingdom; United States
- Education: Winchester College; Magdalen College, Oxford (MA, DLitt); University of Grenoble
- Occupations: Historian; poet
- Spouses: Joan Watkins (m. 1942; div. 1948) Tatiana Mihailova (m. 1948; div. 1962) Caroleen Macfarlane (m. 1964; div. 1978) Elizabeth Wingate (m. 1979)
- Children: 3
- Writing career
- Notable works: The Great Terror (1968); The Harvest of Sorrow (1986)
- Notable awards: See below

George Robert Acworth Conquest (15 July 1917 – 3 August 2015) was a British and American historian, poet, and novelist. He was one of the West’s leading Sovietologists during the Cold War and was influential to both Ronald Reagan and Margaret Thatcher. Conquest was also affiliated with the anticommunist Information Research Department, within the British Foreign Affairs Office.

A long-time research fellow at Stanford University's Hoover Institution, Conquest was most notable for his work on the Soviet Union. His books included The Great Terror: Stalin's Purges of the 1930s (1968); The Harvest of Sorrow: Soviet Collectivization and the Terror-Famine (1986); and Stalin: Breaker of Nations (1991). He was also the author of two novels and several collections of poetry.

== Early life and education ==
Conquest was born in Great Malvern, Worcestershire, to an American father, Robert Folger Wescott Conquest, and an English mother, Rosamund Alys Acworth. His father served in an American Ambulance Field Service unit with the French Army in World War I, and was awarded the Croix de Guerre, with Silver Star in 1916.

Conquest was educated at Winchester College, where he won an exhibition to study Philosophy, Politics and Economics (PPE) at Magdalen College, Oxford. He took a gap year, spending time at the University of Grenoble and in Bulgaria, and returning to Oxford in 1937, where he joined the Communist Party of Great Britain and the Carlton Club. He was awarded an MA in PPE and a DLitt in history.

== Career ==
=== War years ===
In Lisbon on an American passport at the outbreak of the Second World War, Conquest returned to England. As the Communist Party of Great Britain denounced the war in 1939 as imperialist and capitalist, Conquest broke with it and was commissioned into the Oxfordshire and Buckinghamshire Light Infantry on 20 April 1940, serving with the regiment until 1946.

In 1943 he was posted to the School of Slavonic and East European Studies (later part of University College London) to study Bulgarian. The following year he was posted to Bulgaria as a liaison officer to the Bulgarian forces fighting under Soviet command, attached to the Third Ukrainian Front, then to the Allied Control Commission. At the end of the war, he joined the Foreign Office, returning to the British Legation in Sofia where he remained as the press officer. Conquest would later say that he first learned the "horrible realities of a Stalinist takeover" while observing the establishment of the People's Republic of Bulgaria from 1944-48. In 1948 he left Bulgaria when he was recalled to London under a minor diplomatic cloud after he had helped smuggle two Bulgarians out of the country.

=== Information Research Department ===
In 1948 Conquest joined the Foreign Office's Information Research Department (IRD), a "propaganda counter-offensive" unit created by the Labour Attlee government in order to "collect and summarize reliable information about Soviet and communist misdoings, to disseminate it to democratic journalists, politicians, and trade unionists, and to support, financially and otherwise, anticommunist publications." The IRD was also engaged in manipulating public opinion. Conquest was remembered there as a "brilliant, arrogant" figure who had 10 people reporting to him. He continued to work at the Foreign Office until 1956, becoming increasingly involved in the intellectual counter-offensive against communism.

In 1949 Conquest's assistant, Celia Kirwan (later Celia Goodman), approached George Orwell for information to help identify Soviet sympathisers. Orwell's list, discovered after her death in 2002, included Guardian and Observer journalists, as well as E. H. Carr and Charlie Chaplin. Conquest, like Orwell, fell for the beautiful Celia Kirwan, who inspired him to write several poems. One of his foreign office colleagues was Alan Maclean, brother of Donald Maclean, one of the Philby spy ring, who fled to Russia with Guy Burgess in 1951. When his brother defected, Alan resigned, then went to Macmillan and published a book of Conquest's poems. At the Foreign Office, Conquest wrote several papers that sowed the seeds for his later work. One, on the Soviet means of obtaining confessions, was elaborated on in The Great Terror. Other papers were "Peaceful Co-existence in Soviet Propaganda and Theory", and "United Fronts – a Communist Tactic". In 1950 Conquest served briefly as First Secretary in the British Delegation to the United Nations.

=== Writing ===
In 1956 Conquest left the Foreign Office and became a freelance writer and historian. After he left, he says, the Information Research Department (IRD) suggested to him that he could combine some of the data he had gathered from Soviet publications into a book. During the 1960s he edited eight volumes of work produced by the IRD, published in London by the Bodley Head as the Soviet Studies Series. Many of his Foreign Office works were published this way. In the United States, the material was republished as The Contemporary Soviet Union Series by Frederick Praeger, who had previously published several books on communism at the request of the CIA, in addition to works by Aleksandr Solzhenitsyn, Milovan Đilas, Howard Fast, and Charles Patrick Fitzgerald.

In 1962–1963 Conquest was literary editor of The Spectator, but he resigned when he found the job interfering with his historical writing. His first books on the Soviet Union were Common Sense About Russia (1960), The Soviet Deportation of Nationalities (1960) and Power and Policy in the USSR (1961). His other early works on the Soviet Union included Courage of Genius: The Pasternak Affair (1961) and Russia After Khrushchev (1965).

Conquest’s analysis of the Great Purge before the opening of Soviet archives relied on the memoirs and accounts of émigrés and defectors, showtrial transcripts, Khruschev’s testimonies, as well as “imagining” Soviet reality when direct sources were not available. According to historians like Hiroaki Kuromiya, Conquest also considered rumors the "best source of Soviet history."

== Historical works ==
=== The Great Terror (1968) ===
In 1968 Conquest published what became his best-known work, The Great Terror: Stalin's Purge of the Thirties, the first comprehensive research of the Great Purge, which took place in the Soviet Union between 1936 and 1938. Many reviewers at the time were not impressed by his way of writing about the Great Terror, which was in the tradition of "great men who make history". The book was based mainly on information which had been made public, either officially or by individuals, during the so-called "Khrushchev Thaw" in the period 1956–64. It also drew on accounts by Russian and Ukrainian émigrés and exiles dating back to the 1930s, and on an analysis of official Soviet documents such as the Soviet census.

The most important aspect of the book was that it widened the understanding of the purges beyond the previous narrow focus on the "Moscow trials" of disgraced Communist Party of the Soviet Union leaders such as Nikolai Bukharin and Grigory Zinoviev, who were executed shortly thereafter. The question of why these leaders had pleaded guilty and confessed to various crimes at the trials had become a topic of discussion for a number of western writers, and helped inspire anti-Communist tracts such as George Orwell's Nineteen Eighty-Four and Arthur Koestler's Darkness at Noon.

Conquest argued that the trials and executions of these former Communist leaders were a minor detail of the purges. By his estimates, Stalinist purges had led to the deaths of some 20 million people. In 2008, he wrote that the total number of deaths could "hardly be lower than some thirteen to fifteen million."

Conquest sharply criticized Western intellectuals such as Beatrice and Sidney Webb, George Bernard Shaw, Jean-Paul Sartre, Walter Duranty, Sir Bernard Pares, Harold Laski, D. N. Pritt, Theodore Dreiser, Bertolt Brecht, Owen Lattimore, and Romain Rolland, as well as American ambassador Joseph Davies, accusing them of being dupes of Stalin and apologists of his regime. Conquest cites various comments made by them where, he argues, they were denying, excusing, or justifying various aspects of the purges.

After the opening up of the Soviet archives, detailed information was released that Conquest argued supported his conclusions. When Conquest's publisher asked him to expand and revise The Great Terror, Conquest is famously said to have suggested the new version of the book be titled I Told You So, You Fucking Fools. In fact, the mock title was jokingly proposed by Conquest's old friend, Sir Kingsley Amis. The new version was published in 1990 as The Great Terror: A Reassessment; ISBN 0-19-507132-8. The American historian J. Arch Getty disagreed, writing in 1993 that the archives did not support Conquest's casualty figures. In 1995, investigative journalist Paul Lashmar suggested that the reputation of prominent academics such as Robert Conquest was built upon work derived from material provided by the IRD. According to Denis Healey The Great Terror was an important influence, "but one which confirmed people in their views rather than converted them".

Many aspects of his book continue to be disputed by sovietologist historians and researchers on Russian and Soviet history, such as Stephen G. Wheatcroft, who insists that Conquest's victim totals for Stalinist repressions are too high, even in his reassessments. In 2000, Michael Ignatieff, whose family had emigrated from Russia as a result of the Bolshevik Revolution, wrote "One of the few unalloyed pleasures of old age is living long enough to see yourself vindicated. Robert Conquest is currently enjoying this pleasure." Conservative historian Paul Johnson, one of Thatcher's closest advisers, described Conquest as "our greatest living historian". And, in the phrase of Timothy Garton Ash, he was Solzhenitsyn before Solzhenitsyn.

In 1996 Marxist historian Eric Hobsbawm, who had been previously attacked by Conquest for his book Age of Extremes, praised Conquest's The Great Terror "as a remarkable pioneer effort to assess the Stalin Terror". However he expressed the view that this work and others were now to be considered obsolete "simply because the archival sources are now available". As a result, he wrote, there was no need for "fragmentary sources" and "guesswork". "[W]hen better or more complete data are available, they must take the place of poor and incomplete ones." In 2002 Conquest replied to his revisionist critics: "They're still talking absolute balls. In the academy, there remains a feeling of, "Don't let's be too rude to Stalin. He was a bad guy, yes, but the Americans were bad guys too, and so was the British Empire."

=== The Harvest of Sorrow (1986) ===
In 1986 Conquest published The Harvest of Sorrow: Soviet Collectivization and the Terror-Famine, dealing with the collectivization of agriculture in Ukraine and elsewhere in the USSR, under Stalin's direction in 1929–31, and the resulting famine, in which millions of peasants died due to starvation, deportation to labor camps, and execution. In this book, Conquest supported the view that the famine was a planned act of genocide. According to historians Stephen Wheatcroft and R. W. Davies, "Conquest holds that Stalin wanted the famine... and that the Ukrainian famine was deliberately inflicted for its own sake." Nevertheless, he wrote to them in a letter in 2003 that "Stalin purposely inflicted the 1933 famine? No. What I argue is that with resulting famine imminent, he could have prevented it, but put 'Soviet interest' other than feeding the starving first thus consciously abetting it."

=== Stalin and the Kirov Murder (1989) ===
For the Trotskyists, Kirov's murder was the Stalinist equivalent of the Reichstag fire, deliberately started by the Nazis to justify the arrest of German Communists. The Trotskyist-Menshevik view became the dominant one among western historians, popularised in Robert Conquest's influential books.

In The Great Terror, Conquest already undermined the official Soviet story of conspiracy and treason. Conquest placed the murder in 1934 of the Leningrad party boss, Sergei Kirov, one of Stalin's inner circle, as the key to the mechanism of terror.

He returned to this in Stalin and the Kirov Murder (1989), where he argued that Stalin not only sanctioned Kirov's assassination, but used it as a justification for the terror that culminated in 1937–38, though no evidence has been found to confirm Stalin's role in the murder.

== Poetry and literature ==
=== Poems ===
In addition to his scholarly work, Conquest was a well-regarded poet whose poems have been published in various periodicals from 1937. In 1945 he was awarded the PEN Brazil Prize for his war poem "For the Death of a Poet" – about an army friend, the poet Drummond Allison, killed in Italy – and, in 1951, he received a Festival of Britain verse prize. During his lifetime, he had seven volumes of poetry and one of literary criticism published.

Conquest was a major figure in a prominent British literary circle known as "The Movement" which also included Philip Larkin and Kingsley Amis. Movement poets, many of whom bristled at being so labeled, rejected the experiments of earlier practitioners such as Ezra Pound.

He edited, in 1956 and 1962, the influential New Lines anthologies, introducing works by them, as well as Thom Gunn, Dennis Enright, and others, to a wider public. He spent 1959–60 as visiting poet at the University of Buffalo. Several of his poems were published in The New Oxford Book of Light Verse (1978; compiled by Amis), under the pseudonyms "Stuart Howard-Jones", "Victor Gray" and "Ted Pauker".

It emerged from the pages of poet Philip Larkin's published letters that Conquest and Larkin shared an enthusiasm for pornography in the 1950s. When Larkin was in Hull, Conquest sent him judicious selections of the latest pornography, and, when he came down to London, Conquest took him on shopping trips to the Soho porn shops. On one occasion Conquest, in 1957, wrote a letter to Larkin purporting to come from the Vice Squad which had found the poet's name on a pornographic publisher's list. Larkin panicked and went to see his solicitor, convinced that he was going to lose his job as librarian at Hull University, before Conquest owned up. The true story of the joke became, in 2008, Mr Larkin's Awkward Day, a comedy radio play by Chris Harrald.

Soon after his expulsion from the Soviet Union, Aleksandr Solzhenitsyn met with Conquest, asking him to translate a 'little' poem of his into English verse. This was "Prussian Nights" – nearly two thousand lines in ballad metre – published in 1977.

A new Collected Poems, edited by Elizabeth Conquest, was published in March 2020 by the Waywiser Press.

=== Novels ===
Conquest had been a member of the British Interplanetary Society since the 1940s, and shared Amis's taste for science fiction. Starting from 1961, the two writers jointly edited Spectrum, five anthologies of new sci-fi writing. Conquest also proposed to Amis a collaboration based on a draft comic novel that Conquest had completed. This was revised by Amis, then it appeared under both their names as The Egyptologists (1965). The novel is about a secret Egyptological London society that is really a husbands' organization serving as an alibi for philanderers. A reviewer in The New York Times felt that their "elaborate little jokes leave an unpleasant taste".

Later a film version of the novel was cancelled when its star, Peter Sellers, was called away to Hollywood. Conquest published a science-fiction novel, A World of Difference (1955).

== Political works ==
=== What to Do When the Russians Come (1984) ===
In 1984, Robert Conquest wrote, with Jon Manchip White, the fictional book What to Do When the Russians Come: a Survivor's Guide which, however, was intended to be a real survival manual in case of Soviet invasion. This book, as many other works of the mid-1980s in different media, like Sir John Hackett's The Third World War, the movie Red Dawn, and the Milton Bradley game Fortress America, starts from the premise that a Soviet ground-invasion of the United States could be imminent and that the Soviet Union was about to engulf the world.

It is widely accepted that the United States now faces a real possibility of succumbing to the power of an alien regime unless the right policies are pursued. [This book's aim] is, first, to show the American citizen clearly and factually what the results of this possible Soviet domination could be and how it would affect him or her personally; and second, to give some serious advice on how to survive."

Conquest supported the Reagan defense buildup and asked for an increase of expenses on US defense budget, claiming that in the nuclear field NATO was only possibly matching USSR military power:

We live in dangerous times. Such miscalculations are very possible. But they are not inevitable. The American people and their representatives have it in their power to prevent their country from undergoing the ordeal we have described. A democratic government, with all its distractions and disadvantages, ... It is not infallible, it is slow to learn, and it is willing to grasp at comfortable illusions; but it may yet act decisively" "But why should we fear that such an ordeal may face us? The economic potential of the West in gross national product is far greater than that of the Soviet Union....In fact, the Soviet Union is economically far behind the United States. American technology is always a generation ahead of theirs. They have to turn to the United States for wheat. The Soviet economy is at a dead end. The Communist system has failed to win support in any of the countries of Eastern Europe. The Soviet idea has no attractions. On any calculation—of economic power or social advance or intellectual progress there could be no question of the Russians imposing their will. But in terms of actual military power, the West's advantage does not seem to have been made use of. It is at least matched, and many would say overmatched, in the nuclear field; the Western forces in Europe have less than half the striking power of their opponents. It is no good our being more advanced than they are if this is not translated into power—both military power and political willpower."

In 1986 Conquest affirmed that "a science-fiction attitude is a great help in understanding the Soviet Union. It isn't so much whether they're good or bad, exactly; they're not bad or good as we'd be bad or good. It's far better to look at them as Martians than as people like us."

=== Reflections on a Ravaged Century (1999) ===
External videos
- Booknotes interview with Conquest on Reflections on a Ravaged Century, 19 December 1999, C-SPAN
- Presentation by Conquest of Reflections on a Ravaged Century, 19 January 2000, C-SPAN

Reflections on a Ravaged Century is a book devoted to the psychological roots of fanaticism, in which Conquest argues that Communism and Nazism were equal and more twins than opposites.

There is much more in this book about communism than Nazism, partly because of Conquest's greater expertise on communism, and partly because comparatively few Western intellectuals became Nazis. He focuses mainly on attacks on intellectuals in the West who became communists because they felt or believed that this was "anti-fascism" or "anti-Nazism".

=== Laws of politics ===
Conquest posited two laws of politics, apparently not referenced in any of his books but as observations he made in conversations:

1. Generally speaking, everybody is reactionary on subjects he knows about.
2. Every organisation appears to be headed by secret agents of its opponents.

Conquest's first and second law are attested by at least two sources. On 14 February 2003, Andrew Brown wrote of Conquest's campaign against the expansion of university education that "[f]rom this period dates 'Conquest's Law', which states that 'Everyone is a reactionary about subjects he understands'. This was later supplemented with the balancing rule that every organization behaves as if it is run by secret agents of its opponents." In his 1991 Memoirs, Kingsley Amis wrote of Conquest that "he was to point out that, while very 'progressive' on the subject of colonialism and other matters I was ignorant of, I was a sound reactionary about education, of which I had some understanding and experience. From my own and others' example he formulated his famous First Law, which runs, 'Generally speaking, everybody is reactionary on subjects he knows about.' (The Second Law, more recent, says, 'Every organization appears to be headed by secret agents of its opponents.')"

On 25 June 2003, John Derbyshire wrote in the National Review Online's blog The Corner that "[a]s best I can remember", Conquest conjectured three laws of politics:

1. Everyone is conservative about what he knows best.
2. Any organization not explicitly right-wing sooner or later becomes left-wing.
3. The simplest way to explain the behavior of any bureaucratic organization is to assume that it is controlled by a cabal of its enemies.

Derbyshire commented: "Of the Second Law, Conquest gave the Church of England and Amnesty International as examples. Of the third, he noted that a bureaucracy sometimes actually IS controlled by a secret cabal of its enemies – e.g. the postwar British secret service." For these statements, Conquest would become well known among certain thinkers, especially online conservatives; however, Derbyshire cited no source for them and implied his memory was not certain on the matter. Indeed, the second law given here is O'Sullivan's first law, which was stated by John O'Sullivan in his article "O'Sullivan's First Law" in the 27 October 1989 print issue of the National Review, in which he also references Derbyshire's Conquest's third law as Conquest's second law:

That is explained by O'Sullivan's First Law: All organizations that are not actually right-wing will over time become left-wing. I cite as supporting evidence the ACLU, the Ford Foundation, and the Episcopal Church. The reason is, of course, that people who staff such bodies tend to be the sort who don't like private profit, business, making money, the current organization of society, and, by extension, the Western world. At which point Michels's Iron Law of Oligarchy takes over—and the rest follows.

Is there any law which enables us to predict the behavior of right-wing organizations? As it happens, there is: Conquest's Second Law (formulated by the Sovietologist Robert Conquest):

The behavior of an organization can best be predicted by assuming it to be controlled by a secret cabal of its enemies. Examples: virtually any conservative party anywhere, the Ronald Lauder for Mayor campaign, and the British secret service. That last example is, however, flawed, since the British secret service actually was controlled by a secret cabal of its enemies in the form of Kim Philby, Anthony Blunt, et al. In which case, Conquest's Law should have operated to make M1-6 [sic] a crack anti-Soviet intelligence service of James Bond proportions. But these are deep waters.

== Personal life ==
Conquest was married four times, first in 1942 to Joan Watkins, with whom he had two sons. They divorced in 1948. There followed a marriage to Tatiana Mihailova (1948–1962), whom he had helped escape from Bulgaria. She was diagnosed with schizophrenia in 1951. In 1962 he married Caroleen Macfarlane (through whom he was the uncle by marriage of Charles Banner); they divorced in 1978. That year he began dating Elizabeth Neece Wingate, a lecturer in English and the daughter of a United States Air Force colonel. He and Wingate married in 1979. When he died in 2015, he had several grandchildren from his sons and stepdaughter.

== Later life ==
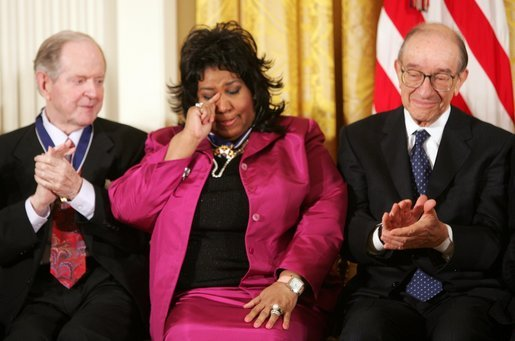
Conquest (left) receiving the Presidential Medal of Freedom with Aretha Franklin (middle) and Alan Greenspan (right) at the White House, November 2005

In 1981 Conquest moved to California to take up a post as Senior Research Fellow and Scholar-Curator of the Russian and Commonwealth of Independent States Collection at Stanford University's Hoover Institution, where he remained a Fellow. In 1985 he signed a petition in support of the anti-Communist Contras (Nicaragua). He was a fellow of the Columbia University's Russian Institute, and of the Woodrow Wilson International Center for Scholars; a distinguished visiting scholar at The Heritage Foundation; a research associate of Harvard University's Ukrainian Research Institute. In 1990 he presented Red Empire, a seven-part mini-series on the Soviet Union produced by Yorkshire Television.

Conquest died in 2015 in Stanford, California, at the age of 98, of respiratory failure as a result of Parkinson's disease.

== Awards and honors ==
Conquest was a Fellow of the British Academy, the American Academy of Arts and Sciences, the Royal Society of Literature, and the British Interplanetary Society, and a Member of the Society for the Promotion of Roman Studies.

His honours include

- Presidential Medal of Freedom (2005)
- Companion of the Order of St Michael and St George (CMG; 1996)
- Officer of the Order of the British Empire (OBE; 1955)
- Commander Cross of the Order of Merit of the Republic of Poland (2009)
- Estonian Cross of Terra Mariana (2008)
- Ukrainian Order of Yaroslav Mudryi (2005).
- Hearing Secret Harmonies, by Anthony Powell, the final volume in Powell's 12 volume sequence, A Dance to the Music of Time, is dedicated to Conquest.
- A street in (the Ukrainian city of) Dnipro was renamed after Robert Conquest in February 2024

His awards include:

- Selection by the National Endowment for the Humanities to deliver the 1993 Jefferson Lecture (the highest honor the U.S. government bestows for distinguished intellectual achievement in the humanities)
- Richard Weaver Award for Scholarly Letters (1999)
- Michael Braude Award for Light Verse (American Academy of Arts & Letters,1997)
- Dan David Prize (2012).
- Conquest was a member of the advisory council of the Victims of Communism Memorial Foundation.
- Shevchenko National Prize (1994)
- Antonovych prize (1987)

== Selected works ==
Historical and political

- Common Sense About Russia (1960)
- Power and Policy in the U.S.S.R.: The Struggle for Stalin's Succession 1945-1960 (1961)
- The Soviet Deportation of Nationalities (1960)
- Courage of Genius: The Pasternak Affair (1961)
- Russia After Khrushchev (1965)
- The Politics of Ideas in the USSR (1967)
- Soviet Nationalities Policy in Practice (1967)
- Industrial Workers in the USSR (1967)
- Agricultural Workers in the USSR (1968)
- Religion in the U.S.S.R. (1968)
- The Soviet Political System (1968)
- The Soviet Police System (1968)
- Justice and the Legal System in the U.S.S.R. (1968)
- The Great Terror: Stalin's Purge of the Thirties (1968)
  - The Great Terror: A Reassessment (1990)
  - The Great Terror: 40th Anniversary Edition (2008)
- Where Marx Went Wrong (1970)
- The Nation Killers: The Soviet Deportation of Nationalities (1970)
- The Human Cost of Soviet Communism (Prepared for the Subcommittee to Investigate the Administration of the Internal Security Act and Other Internal Security Laws, of the Committee on the Judiciary, United States Senate, 1970)
- V.I. Lenin (1972)
- The Russian Tradition (with Tibor Szamuely, 1974)
- Kolyma: The Arctic Death Camps (1979)
- Present Danger: Towards a Foreign Policy (1979)
- We & They: Civic & Despotic Cultures (1980)
- The Man-made Famine in Ukraine (with James Mace, Michael Novak and Dana Dalrymple, 1984)
- What to Do When the Russians Come: A Survivor's Guide (with Jon Manchip White, 1984)
- Inside Stalin's Secret Police: NKVD Politics, 1936–1939 (1985)
- The Harvest of Sorrow: Soviet Collectivization and the Terror-Famine (1986)
- The Last Empire: Nationality and the Soviet Future (1986)
- Tyrants and Typewriters: Communiques in the Struggle for Truth (1989)
- Stalin and the Kirov Murder (1989)
- Stalin: Breaker of Nations (1991)
- History, Humanity, and Truth (1993)
- Reflections on a Ravaged Century (1999)
- The Dragons of Expectation: Reality and Delusion in the Course of History, W. W. Norton & Company (2004), ISBN 0-393-05933-2

Journal articles

- The Limits of Detente. Foreign Affairs, 46(4), pp. 733–742.
- Stalin's Successors. (1970) Foreign Affairs, 48(3), pp. 509–524.
- A New Russia? A New World? (1975) Foreign Affairs, 53(3), pp. 482–497.
- Revisionizing Stalin's Russia. (1987) The Russian Review, 46(4), pp. 386–390.
- Academe and the Soviet Myth. (1993) The National Interest, 31, pp. 91–98.
- Toward an English-Speaking Union. (1999) The National Interest, (57), pp. 64–70.
- Downloading Democracy. (2004) The National Interest, (78), pp. 29–32.

Poetry

- Poems (1956)
- Back to Life: Poems from behind the Iron Curtain as translator/editor (1958)
- Between Mars and Venus (1962)
- Arias from a Love Opera, and Other Poems (1969)
- Forays (1979)
- New and Collected Poems (1988)
- Demons Don't (1999)
- Penultimata (2009)
- A Garden of Erses [limericks, as Jeff Chaucer] (2010)
- Blokelore and Blokesongs (2012)

Novels

- A World of Difference (1955)
- The Egyptologists (with Kingsley Amis, 1965)

Criticism

- The Abomination of Moab (1979)
