= Ralph Murray =

British journalist and diplomat (1908–1983)

Sir Ralph Murray
- Born: Francis Ralph Hay Murray; 3 March 1908
- Died: 11 September 1983 (aged 75)
- Education: Brentwood School
- Alma mater: St Edmund Hall, Oxford
- Occupations: Journalist, diplomat
- Title: Director, Information Research Department (1949–54); British Minister, Cairo (1954-56); British Ambassador to Greece (1962–67); Governor of the BBC (1967–83)
- Spouse(s): Mauricette Vladimira Marie, Reichsgräfin von Kuenburg
- Children: Ingram, Nicholas, Georgina and Simon
- Parent(s): Revd. Charles Murray & Mabel Umfreville
- Relatives: Al Murray (grandson)
- Awards: Knight Commander of the Order of St Michael and St George; Companion of the Order of the Bath

Sir Francis Ralph Hay Murray KCMG CB (3 March 1908 – 11 September 1983) was a British journalist, radio broadcaster and diplomat. He was also once the head of the Information Research Department (IRD), a secret branch of the UK Foreign Office dedicated to pro-colonial and anti-communist propaganda during the Cold War.

== Background and education ==
A great-great-great grandson of John Murray, 3rd Duke of Atholl, he was the son of the Revd Charles Murray, Rector of Kirby Knowle, Yorkshire, by his wife Mabel (née Umfreville). His great-grandfather was the Rt Revd Dr George Murray, Bishop of Rochester (who married Lady Sarah Hay-Drummond), while the actor Stephen Murray was his younger brother. He was educated at Brentwood School and St Edmund Hall, Oxford. His father died in 1919 from the Spanish flu pandemic.

== Career ==
Murray spoke French, German, Italian, Spanish, Greek, Hungarian and some Russian. Before the Second World War he worked for the BBC as a journalist, having previously worked for a Bristol newspaper. In 1935 he reported the Saarland Plebiscite – and succeeded in broadcasting live during the 9 o'clock news holding a microphone out of the window to capture the chants of the mob. From 1941 he was a member of the Underground Propaganda Committee (UPC) which had been formed to fuel a whispering campaign to undermine any invasion. He was also associated with Bletchley Park, and was involved in supporting resistance activity, notably, from 1943, of the Yugoslavian Partisans where he met Josip Broz Tito. His wife Mauricette was involved in propaganda broadcasting to occupied Europe, notably to Sweden where she had spent several years as a child.

In 1949 he became the director of the Information Research Department (IRD), This organization, which had close links with SIS/MI6, was formed by Clement Attlee in 1947 to carry on the work of the wartime "Political Warfare Executive", itself closely affiliated with SOE. At that time the intention was to promote a socialist Britain as an international third way, although in practice its resources were mainly devoted to attacking Communism and the Soviet Union. During this time Murray coined the phrase "Communo-fascism" to emphasize the similarity between Soviet communism and the Nazis.

In a pattern that was later to be repeated, Murray was appointed Minister at the British Embassy in Cairo in Egypt during the tense run up to the Suez Crisis in 1956. Personally fond of, and having some admiration for, President Nasser, he found himself having considerable distaste for the policy he was required to implement.

Murray was knighted KCMG in 1962 (CMG, 1950), when he was appointed British Ambassador to Greece. He held this post until 1967 and the right wing coup of the Greek Army Colonels which led to the formation of the Greek military junta of 1967-1974. He appears to have been frustrated with the passivity of the British government's actions both in the lead up to the coup of which there was some intelligence foreknowledge, and its ineffectual response. In particular he had little regard for George Brown, the then Foreign Secretary. He retired from HM diplomatic service in 1967, when he was appointed a BBC governor.

== Family ==
In 1935, he married Mauricette Vladimira Marie Reichsgräfin von Kuenburg, an Austrian aristocrat, the only child of Count Bernhard von Kuenburg. They had four children; Ingram, Nicholas, Georgina and Simon. The comedian, TV personality and parliamentary candidate, Al Murray, is his grandson.

Sir Ralph died in 1983.

Diplomatic posts
Preceded by Sir Roger Allen	British Ambassador to Greece; 1962–1967	Succeeded by Sir Michael Stewart
