= Information Research Department =

1948–1977 UK government propaganda agency

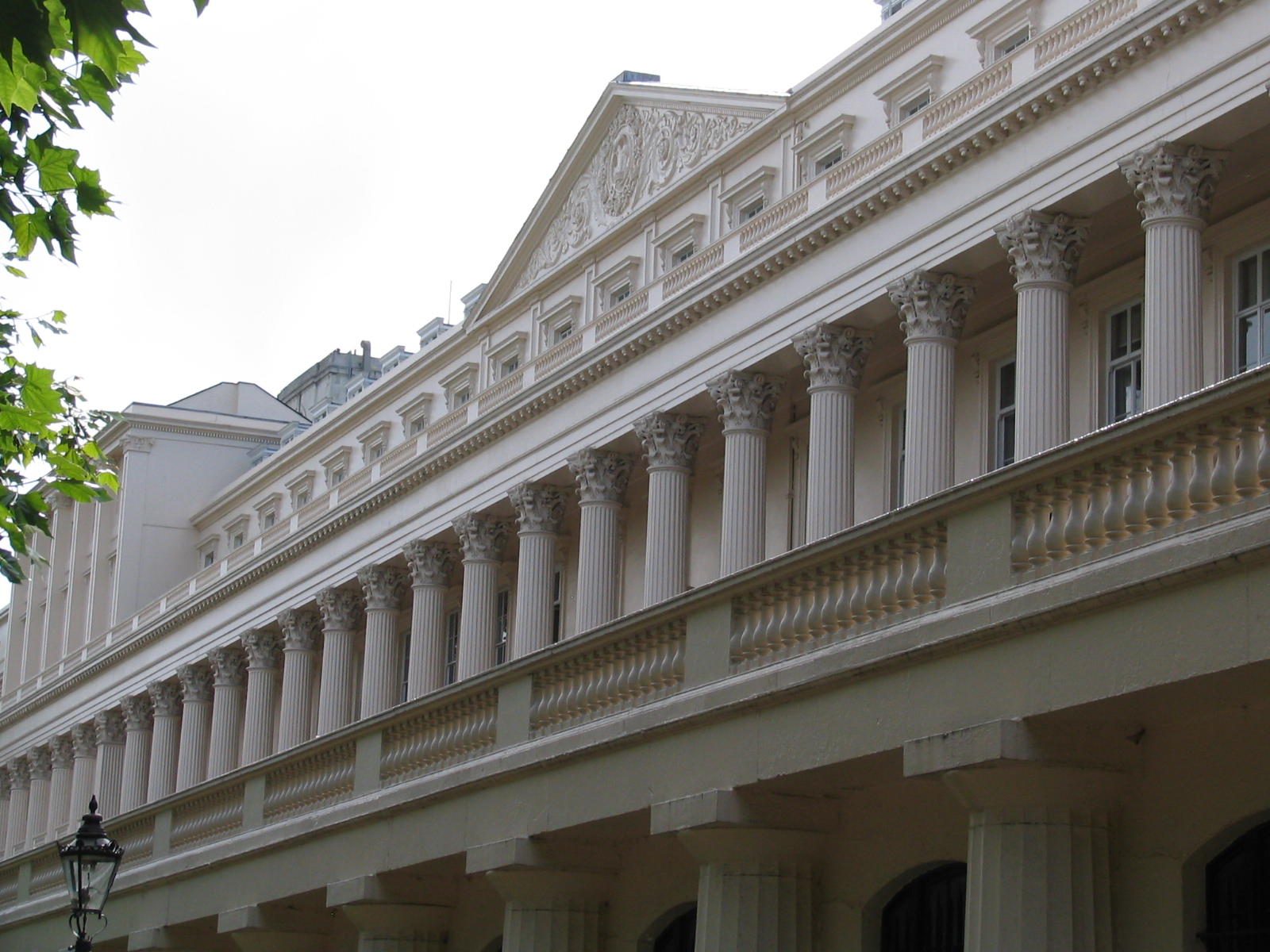
- Carlton House Terrace, the original home of the Information Research Department's propaganda activities

Agency overview
- Formed: 1948; 78 years ago
- Dissolved: 1977; 49 years ago
- Jurisdiction: United Kingdom
- Employees: Estimated 400-600 at height.
- Parent agency: Foreign Office

The Information Research Department (IRD) was a secret Cold War propaganda department of the British Foreign Office, created to publish anti-communist propaganda, including black propaganda, provide support and information to anti-communist politicians, academics, and writers, and to use weaponised information, but also disinformation and "fake news", to attack not only its original targets but also certain socialists and anti-colonial movements. Soon after its creation, the IRD broke away from focusing solely on Soviet matters and began to publish pro-colonial propaganda intended to suppress pro-independence revolutions in Asia, Africa, Ireland, and the Middle East. The IRD was heavily involved in the publishing of books, newspapers, leaflets and journals, and even created publishing houses to act as propaganda fronts, such as Ampersand Limited. Operating for 29 years, the IRD is known as the longest-running covert government propaganda department in British history, the largest branch of the Foreign Office, and the first major anglophone propaganda offensive against the USSR since the end of World War II. By the 1970s, the IRD was performing military intelligence tasks for the British Military in Northern Ireland during The Troubles.

The IRD promoted works by many presumably anti-communist authors including George Orwell, Arthur Koestler, Bertrand Russell, and Robert Conquest.

Internationally, the IRD took part in many historic events, including Britain's entry into the European Economic Community, the Korean War, the Suez Crisis, the Malayan Emergency, The Troubles, the Mau Mau Uprising, Cyprus Emergency, and the Sino-Indian War. Other IRD activities included forging letters and posters, conducting smear attacks against British trade unionists, and attacking opponents of the British military by planting fake news stories in the British press. Some of the fabricated stories the IRD created included accusations that Irish republicans were killing dogs by setting them on fire and falsely accusing members of EOKA, also anti-communist, of raping schoolgirls.

Although the existence of the IRD was successfully kept hidden from the British public until the 1970s, the Soviet Union had always been aware of its existence, for Guy Burgess had been posted to the IRD for a period of two months in 1948. Burgess was later sacked by the IRD's founder Christopher Mayhew, who accused him of being "dirty, drunk and idle". The IRD closed its operations in 1977 after its existence was discovered by British journalists after an investigation into a heavy amount of anti-Soviet propaganda being published by academics belonging to St Antony's College, Oxford. An exposé by David Leigh published in The Guardian, entitled "Death of the Department that Never Was", became the first public acknowledgement of the IRD's existence.

== Origins ==
Since 1946, many senior officials of both the Foreign Office and the right of the Labour Party had proposed the creation of an anti-communist propaganda organ. Christopher Warner raised a formal proposal in April 1946, but Secretary of State for Foreign Affairs Ernest Bevin was reluctant to upset the pro-Soviet members of the Labour Party. Later in the summer, Bevin rejected another proposal by Ivone Kirkpatrick to set up an anti-communist propaganda unit. In 1947, Christopher Mayhew lobbied for the proposals, linking anti-communism with the concept of "Third Force", which was meant to be a progressive camp between the Soviet Union and the United States. This framing, together with anti-British Soviet propaganda attacks during the same years, led Bevin to change his position and to start discussing the details for the creation of a propaganda unit. After sending a confidential paper to the foreign secretary, Ernest Bevin, in 1947, Mayhew was summoned by Attlee to Chequers to discuss it further.

On 8 January 1948, the Cabinet of the United Kingdom adopted the Future Foreign Publicity, memorandum drafted by Christopher Mayhew and signed by Ernest Bevin. The memorandum embraced anti-communism and took upon the British Labour Government to lead anti-communist progressivism internationally, stating:

It is for us, as Europeans and as a Social Democratic Government, and not the Americans, to give the lead in spiritual, moral and political sphere to all the democratic elements in Western Europe which are anti-Communist and, at the same time, genuinely progressive and reformist, believing in freedom, planning and social justice—what one might call the 'Third Force'.

— Ernest Bevin, Future Foreign Publicity memorandum, 4 January 1948

To achieve these goals, the memorandum called for the establishment of a Foreign Office department "to collect information" about Communism and to "provide material for our anti-Communist publicity through our Missions and Information Services abroad". The department would collaborate with ministers, British delegates, the Labour Party, trade union representatives, the Central Office of Information, and the BBC Overseas Service. The new department was finally established as the Information Research Department. Mayhew ran the department with Sir Ivone Kirkpatrick until 1950. The original offices were in Carlton House Terrace, before moving to Riverwalk House, Millbank, London.

== Staff and collaborators ==
The IRD was once one of the largest and well-funded organisations of the UK Foreign Office, with an estimated 400-600 employees at its height. The IRD founded under Clement Attlee's post-WWII Labour Party government (1945-1951) was headed by career civil servants including Ralph Murray, John Rennie, and Ray Whitney who became a Conservative MP and minister. Ann Elwell, over a twenty year career, became a central figure in the IRD. Although the vast majority of IRD staff were British subjects, the department also hired emigres from the Soviet Union, such as the rocket scientist Grigori Tokaty. Other staffers of note include Robert Conquest, whose secretary Celia Kirwan collected Orwell's list. Tracy Philipps was also based at the IRD, working to recruit emigres from Eastern Europe. Many IRD agents were former members of Britain's WWII propaganda department, the Political Warfare Executive (PWE), including former Daily Mirror journalist Leslie Sheridan. This high level of PWE veterans within the IRD, coupled with the similarities between how these two propaganda departments operated, has led some historians to describe the department as a "peacetime PWE".

Outside of full-time agents, many historians, writers, and academics were either paid directly to publish anti-communist propaganda by the IRD or whose works were bought and distributed by the department using British embassies to both translate and distribute their works across the globe. Some of these authors include George Orwell, Bertrand Russell, Arthur Koestler, Czesław Miłosz, Brian Crozier, Richard Crossman, Will Lawther, A. J. P. Taylor, Baron Wyatt of Weeford, Leonard Schapiro, Denis Healey, Douglas Hyde, Margarete Buber, Victor Kravchenko, W.N. Ewer, Victor Feather, Fay Weldon and hundreds (possibly thousands) of others. Some authors such as Bertrand Russell were fully aware of the funding for their books, while others such as the philosopher Bryan Magee were outraged when they found out.

=== Bertrand Russell ===
As part of its remit "to collect and summarize reliable information about Soviet and communist misdoings, to disseminate it to friendly journalists, politicians, and trade unionists, and to support, financially and otherwise, anti-communist publications", it subsidised the publication of books by 'Background Books', including three by Bertrand Russell, Why Communism Must Fail, What Is Freedom?, and What Is Democracy? The IRD bulk-ordered thousands of copies of Russell's books, including his work Why Communism Must Fail, and worked with the United States government to distribute them using embassies as cover. Working closely with the British Council, the IRD built Russell's reputation as an anti-communist writer, and to use his works to project power overseas.

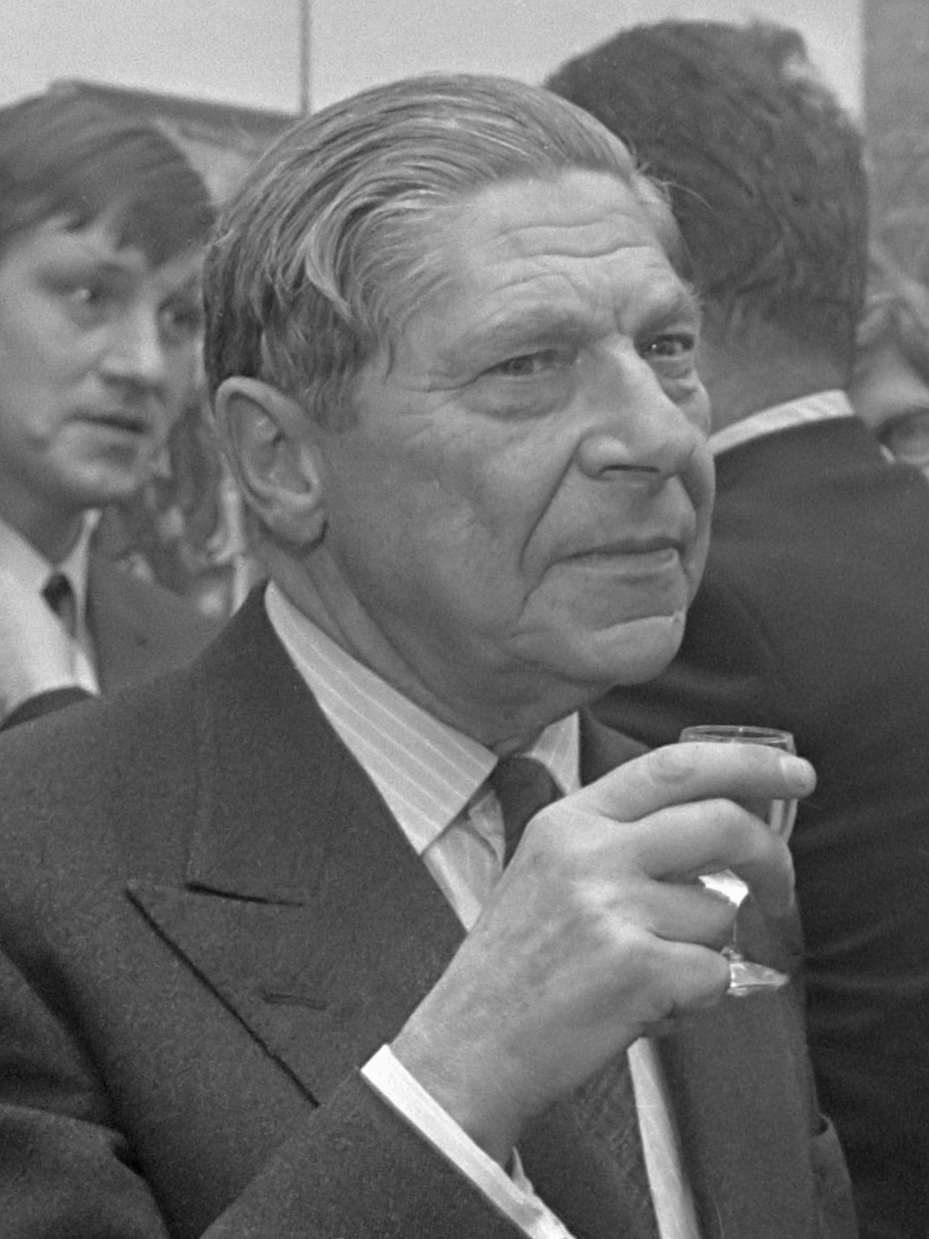
Arthur Koestler worked closely with the IRD who republished and distributed his anti-communist books free of charge. Koestler also consulted IRD agents on creating better propaganda and persuaded the British government to secretly fund left-wing anti-communist books.

=== Arthur Koestler ===
Koestler enjoyed strong personal relationships with IRD agents from 1949 onwards and was supportive of the department's anti-communist goals. Koestler's relationship with the British government was so strong that he had become a de facto advisor to British propagandists, urging them to create a popular series of anti-communist left-wing literature to rival the success of the Left Book Club. In return for his services to British propaganda, the IRD assisted Koestler by purchasing thousands of copies of his book Darkness at Noon and distributing them throughout Germany.

=== Directors ===
- 1948–1951: Ralph Murray
- 1951–1953: John Peck
- 1954–1958: John Rennie
- 1958–1962: Donald Hopson
- 1962–1966: Christopher Barclay
- 1966–1969: Nigel Clive
- 1969–1971: Kenneth Crook
- 1971–1975: Thomas Christopher Barker
- 1975–1977: Ray Whitney

== Propaganda ==
The IRD created, sponsored, and distributed a wide range of propaganda publications both fiction and non-fiction, in the form of books, magazines, pamphlets, newspaper articles, radio broadcasts, and cartoons. Books which the IRD believed could be used for British propaganda purposes were translated into dozens of languages and then distributed using British embassies. Most IRD material targeted the Soviet Union, but much IRD work also attacked socialist and anti-colonial revolutionaries in Cyprus, Malaya (now Malaysia), Singapore, Ireland, Korea, Egypt, and Indonesia. In Britain, the department used its propaganda to spread smear stories targeting trade union leaders and human rights activists, but was also used by the Labour Party to conduct internal purges against socialist members.

British introductions to IRD were made discreetly, with journalists being told as little as possible about the department. Propaganda material was sent to their homes under plain cover as correspondence marked "personal" carried no departmental identification or reference. They were told documents were "prepared" in the FCO primarily for members of the diplomatic service, but that it was allowed to give them on a personal basis to a few people outside the service who might find them of interest. As such, they were not statements of official policy and should not be attributed to HMG, nor should the titles themselves be quoted in discussion or in print. The papers should not be shown to anyone else and they were to be destroyed when no longer needed.

=== Animal Farm - George Orwell ===
Animal Farm was republished, distributed, translated, and promoted for many years by IRD agents. Of all the propaganda works ever supported by the IRD, Animal Farm was given more attention and support by IRD agents than any publication in the department's history and arguably given more support from the British and American governments than any other propaganda book in the Cold War. The IRD gained the translation rights to Animal Farm in Chinese, Danish, Dutch, French, German, Finnish, Hebrew, Italian, Japanese, Indonesian, Latvian, Norwegian, Polish, Portuguese, Spanish, and Swedish. The Chinese version of Animal Farm was created in a joint operation between British and American government propagandists, which also included a pictorial version.

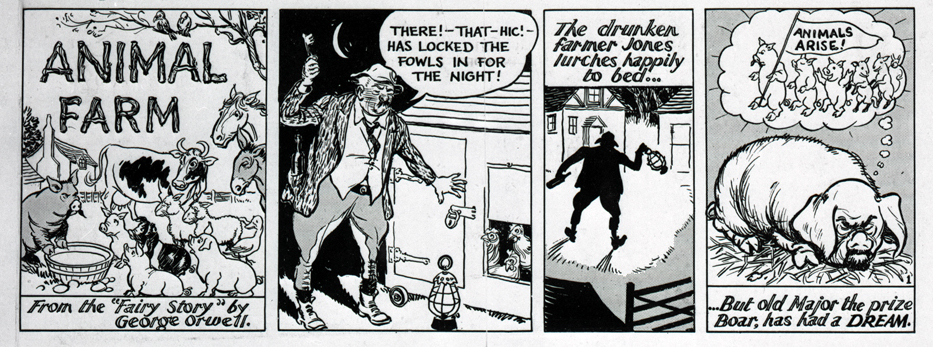
One of the Animal Farm cartoon strips commissioned and distributed by the IRD. This example was drawn by British cartoonist Norman Pett.

To further promote Animal Farm, the IRD commissioned cartoon strips to be planted in newspapers across the globe. The foreign rights to distribute these cartoons were acquired by the IRD for Cyprus, Tanganyika, Kenya, Uganda, Northern and Southern Rhodesia, Nyasaland, Sierra Leone, Gold Coast, Nigeria, Trinidad, Jamaica, Fiji, British Guiana and British Honduras.

=== Encounter magazine ===
In a joint operation with the CIA, Encounter magazine was established. Published in the United Kingdom, it was a largely Anglo-American intellectual and cultural journal, originally associated with the anti-Stalinist left, intended to counter the idea of cold war neutralism. The magazine was rarely critical of American foreign policy, but beyond this editors had considerable publishing freedom. It was edited by Stephen Spender from 1953 to 1966. Spender resigned after it emerged that the Congress for Cultural Freedom, which published the magazine, was being covertly funded by the CIA.

== Activities ==
=== Arab World ===
The IRD had two major Arabic projects, a radio station and a news agency. The Near Eastern Arabic Broadcasting Station or Sharq al Adna broadcast from a powerful transmitter in Cyprus. It had a staff of 150, most of whom were Palestinian. It was the cause of some embarrassment to MI6 due to generating a profit. The Arab News Agency was originally based in Cairo. In August 1956 twenty people, including four British citizens were arrested. Two British Embassy staff were expelled as well as three journalists from the Evening Standard, and one from the Daily Mail. At the subsequent trial James Swinburn, the ANA secretary, confessed to the charges and was sentenced to five years in prison. An Egyptian army officer was sentenced to death and his son to life in prison. Several other Egyptians were given long sentences. After the Suez War the ANA transferred its HQ to Beirut, where it set up a secret arrangement with Reuters whereby it paid £28,000 a year to be sole distributor of Reuters’ reports.

=== Italy ===
In 1948, fearing a victory of the Italian Communist Party in the general election, the IRD instructed the Embassy of the United Kingdom in Rome to disseminate anti-communist propaganda. Ambassador Victor Mallet chaired a small ad hoc committee to circulate IRD propaganda material to anti-communist journalists and Italian Socialist Party and Christian Democracy politicians.

=== Indonesia ===
Following the abortive Indonesian Communist coup attempt of 1965 and the subsequent mass killings, the IRD's South East Asia Monitoring Unit in Singapore assisted the Indonesian Army's destruction of the Indonesian Communist Party (PKI) by circulating anti-PKI propaganda through several radio channels including the British Broadcasting Corporation, Radio Malaysia, Radio Australia, and the Voice of America, and through newspapers like The Straits Times. The same anti-PKI message was repeated by an anti-Sukarno radio station called Radio Free Indonesia and the IRD's own newsletter. Recurrent themes emphasised by the IRD included the alleged brutality of PKI members in murdering the Indonesian generals and their families, Chinese intervention in the Communist attempt to overthrow the government, and the PKI subverting Indonesian on behalf of foreign powers. The IRD's propaganda efforts were aided by the United States, Australian and Malaysian governments which had an interest in supporting the Army's anti-communist mass murder and opposing President Sukarno. The IRD's information efforts helped corroborate the Indonesia Army's propaganda efforts against the PKI. In addition, the Harold Wilson Labour Government and its Australian counterpart gave the Indonesian Army leadership an assurance that British and Commonwealth forces would not step up the Indonesia-Malaysia Confrontation.

=== British trade unions ===
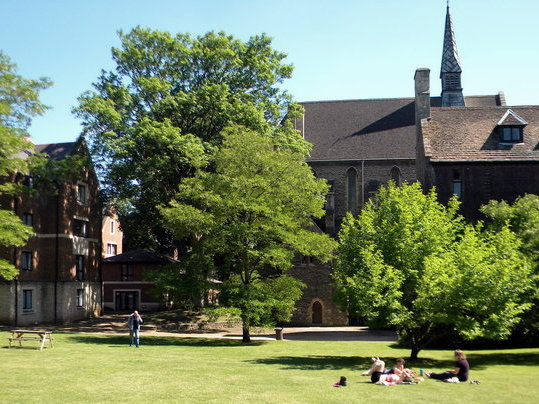
St Antony's College, Oxford was home to several academics working for the IRD, including R.N. Carew Hunt (1890–1959), a wartime SIS staff member, whose overzealous publication of anti-communist propaganda attracted the attention of investigative journalists. The following investigation led to the discovery of the IRD's existence.

In 1969 Home Secretary James Callaghan requested actions that would hinder the careers of two "politically motivated" trade unionists, Jack Jones of the Transport and General Workers Union and Hugh Scanlon of the Amalgamated Engineering Union. This issue was raised in the cabinet and further discussed with Secretary of State for Employment Barbara Castle. A plan for detrimental leaks to the media was placed in the IRD files, and the head of the IRD prepared a briefing paper. Information about how this was effected has not been released under the thirty-year rule under a section of the Public Records Act permitting national security exemptions.

=== Stokeley Carmichael ===
In 2022 declassified documents showed that the IRD attacked the U.S. Black Power movement with covert disinformation in the 1960s. Civil rights leader Stokeley Carmichael, who had fled to Africa, was targeted; he was claimed to be a foreigner in Africa who was contemptuous of Africans, rather than a Communist stooge. The IRD created a fake west African organisation called The Black Power – Africa's Heritage Group, which criticised Carmichael as an "unbidden prophet from America" who had abandoned the U.S. Black Power cause, with no place in Africa, who was "weaving a bloody trail of chaos in the name of Pan-Africanism", controlled by Kwame Nkrumah, the independence leader and former president of Ghana deposed by a coup in 1966.

=== Reuters ===
In 1969 Reuters agreed to open a reporting service in the Middle East as part of an IRD plan to influence the international media. To protect the reputation of Reuters, which might have been damaged if the funding from the British government became known, the BBC paid Reuters "enhanced subscriptions" for access to its news service and was in turn compensated by the British government for the extra expense. The BBC paid Reuters £350,000 over four years.

=== Chile ===
The IRD conducted a propaganda programme to prevent Salvador Allende from being elected president of Chile in the 1964 election. Allende's nationalisation policy threatened British and US interests since Chile's copper mines were largely owned by US companies. In the lead up to the election, the IRD was told by a British Cabinet Office unit called the "Counter-subversion Committee's Working Group on Latin America" that "it will be important to prevent significant gains by the extreme left". The IRD supported Allende's opponent Eduardo Frei Montalva in the lead up to the election by distributing material to its reliable contacts that was critical of Allende, and favourable to Frei.

The distribution of propaganda material by the IRD diminished after Allende was elected president in 1970, but increased again after the 1973 coup. The material was passed "to the Chilean Ministry of Foreign Affairs, Government information organisations" and the dictatorship's "military intelligence" services. The IRD helped Pinochet's government to develop a counter-insurgency strategy in order to stabilise it against domestic opposition. The counter insurgency techniques provided to Chile by the IRD were developed by Britain during its colonial interventions in Southeast Asia. The Chilean authorities were told not to reveal that the information came from the British government.

== Controversies ==
The ethical objection raised by IRD's critics was that the public did not know the source of the information and could therefore not make allowances for the possible bias. It differed thus from straightforward propaganda from the British point of view. This was countered by saying that the information was given to those who were already sympathetic to democracy and the West, and who had arrived at these positions independently.

=== Unattributed use by authors ===
Some writers who worked for the IRD have since been found to have used IRD material and presented it to the academic community as though it were their own work. Robert Conquest's book The Great Terror: Stalin's Purge of the Thirties "drew heavily from IRD files", and multiple volumes of Soviet history which Conquest edited had also contained IRD material.

=== Orwell's List ===
The IRD became the subject of heavy controversy in the UK after it was revealed that George Orwell had given the department a list of 38 people he suspected of being secret Communists or "fellow travellers".

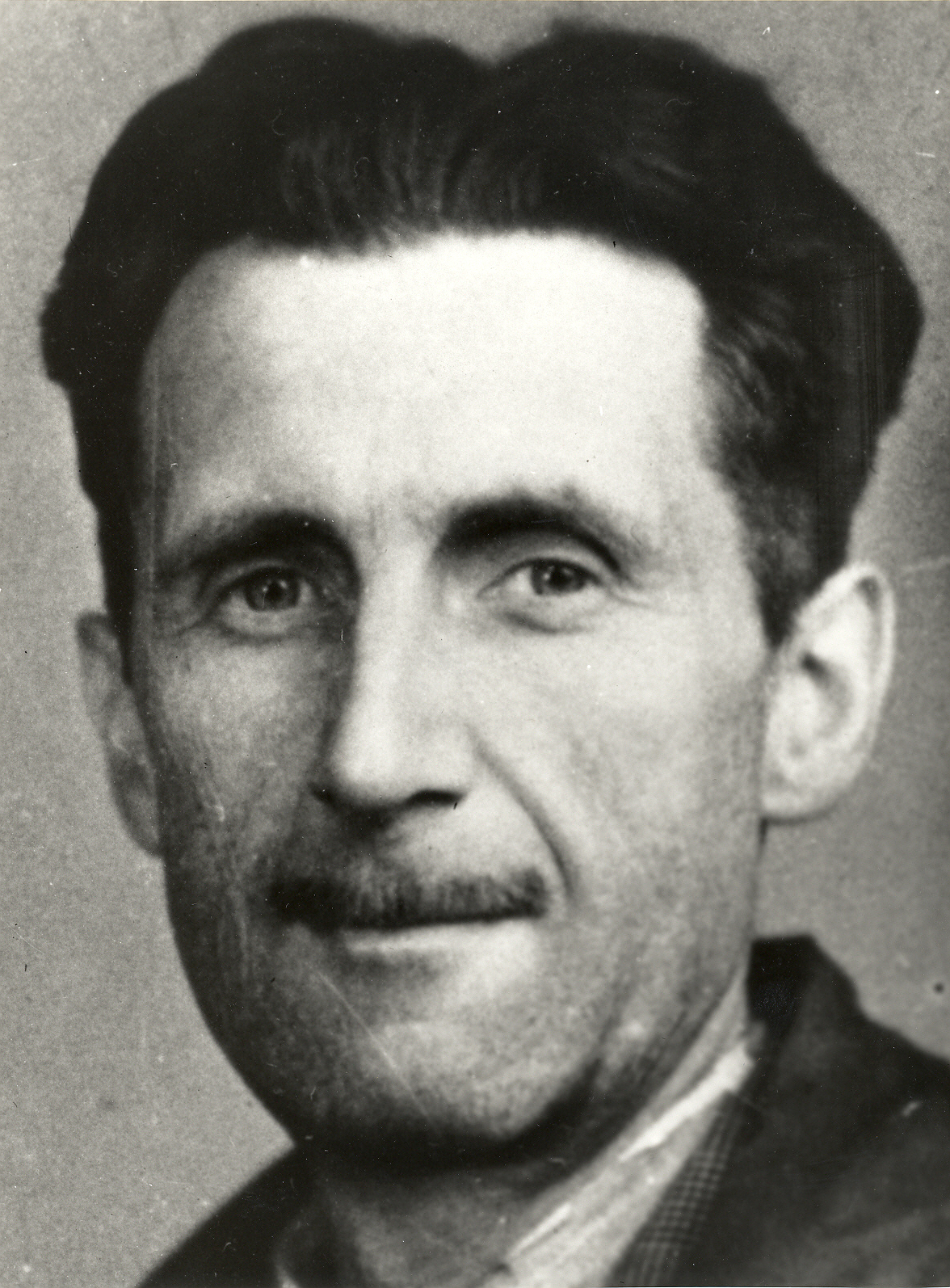
George Orwell worked closely with the IRD, giving them a list of suspected Communists (Orwell's list). The IRD translated Animal Farm into at least 16 languages, and distributed it in over 14 countries.

The existence of Orwell's List, also known as Foreign Office File "FO/111/189", was made public in 1996. The names included on the list were not made public until 2003. The list came into possession of the IRD in 1949, after being collected by IRD agent Celia Kirwan. Kirwan was a close friend of Orwell, she was also Arthur Koestler's sister-in-law and the secretary for fellow IRD agent Robert Conquest. Guy Burgess was based in the next office to her own. The list itself was divided into three columns headed "Name" "Job" and "Remarks", and referred to those listed as "FTs" meaning fellow travellers, and labelled people he believed of being suspected of being secret Marxists as "cryptos". Some of the names listed by Orwell included filmmaker Charlie Chaplin, writer J. B. Priestley, actor Michael Redgrave, historian E. H. Carr, New Statesman editor Kingsley Martin, New York Times's Moscow correspondent Walter Duranty, historian Isaac Deutscher, Labour Party MP Tom Driberg and the novelist Naomi Mitchison, as well as lesser-known writers and journalists. Only one of the people named by Orwell, Peter Smollett, was ever revealed to have been a real Soviet agent, as Orwell suspected. Smollett had been the head of the Soviet section in the British Ministry of Information, while in fact being a Soviet agent who had been recruited by Kim Philby.

Reactions to Orwell's list have been mixed, with some people crediting Orwell's actions to mental illness, others labelling him a "snitch" and theorising that Orwell's suspicion of numerous African, homosexual, and Jewish people within his list signified bigotry, and others minimising the significance the list. Academic Norman MacKenzie, who knew Orwell personally and considered him a friend, lived long enough to discover that Orwell had reported him to the British secret service on suspicion of being a secret Communist. MacKenzie responded to learning that Orwell had reported him, and credited Orwell's actions to his degrading mental state caused by tuberculosis. Alexander Cockburn was far less sympathetic, labelling Orwell a "snitch" and a bigot for the information included in Orwell's notebook, another list of suspected Communists that came into the possession of the IRD. This notebook created by Orwell which contained 135 names, was also found to have been held by the Foreign Office. Within this document, Orwell describes African-American Civil Rights leader Paul Robeson as a "very anti-white...U.S Negro".

On the other hand, Christopher Hitchens wrote in 1996 that the list only names people already publicly known as left-leaning. Citing Kirwan's account of the event, Hitchens noted that Orwell "was only giving [Kirwan] the names of various people who were already very well known to anybody who studied Communism. It wasn't as if he was revealing the names of spies." Hitchens further noted, "Nothing that Orwell discussed with his old flame was ever used for a show trial or a bullying "hearing" or a blacklist or a witch-hunt. He wasn't interested in unearthing heresy or in getting people fired or in putting them under the discipline of a loyalty oath. He just wanted to keep a clear accounting in the battle of ideas."

=== Fabricated rape and paedophilia allegations ===
During the Cyprus Emergency, IRD agents used newspaper journalists to spread fabricated stories that guerrillas belonging to the National Organisation of Cypriot Fighters (EOKA), had raped schoolgirls. These propaganda stories were manufactured as a part of 'Operation TEA-PARTY', a black propaganda operation in which IRD agents created pamphlets accusing EOKA guerrillas of forcing schoolgirls to have sex with them, and alleging that the youngest of these schoolgirls was 12 years old. Among other fabricated stories, IRD agents attempted to convince American journalists that EOKA had links to Communism in an attempt to gain American support, citing "secret documents" and "classified intelligence reports" which said journalists were never allowed to view.

== Discovery and closure ==
In 1973 the IRD underwent major cut backs. By 1977 its budget had been cut by 60% and its 1971 staff of 117 reduced to 85. The department was said to be closed down by then Foreign Secretary, David Owen, in 1977. Its existence was not made public until 1978.

== See also ==
- Office of Policy Coordination (OPC), part of the United States CIA
- Research, Information and Communications Unit, part of the UK Home Office
