= The King Incorporated =

1963 book by Neal Ascherson

The King Incorporated: Leopold the Second in the age of trusts
- First edition
- Author: Neal Ascherson
- Language: English
- Publisher: George Allen & Unwin
- Publication date: 1963
- Publication place: United Kingdom
- Media type: Print
- Pages: 310
- ISBN: 1-86207-290-6
- Dewey Decimal: 923.1493
- Followed by: The Polish August : the self-limiting revolution

The King Incorporated was the first history book published by award-winning Scottish journalist and historian Neal Ascherson exploring the course of the Congo Free State from its foundation to annexation, as well as the role of King Leopold II.

The King Incorporated was first published in 1963 (three years after the Congo's independence from Belgium) and has been reprinted in eight editions. The 1999 edition (published by Granta) modified the book's title to The King Incorporated: Leopold the Second and the Congo, omitting the reference to trusts.

== Reception ==
The work was described by The Guardian as "a fascinating account of Leopold II of Belgium and his extraordinary attempt to integrate the rapacious exploitation of a personal colony with a version of 19th-century European kingship." The celebrated British historian A.J.P. Taylor also praised the work.
