= Ruth Adam =

Feminist writer of novels, comics and non-fiction from England (1907–1977)

- Adam in 1937
- Born: Ruth Augusta King; 14 December 1907; Arnold, Nottinghamshire, England
- Died: 3 February 1977 (aged 69); Marylebone, London, England
- Occupations: Writer of novels, comics and non-fiction
- Spouse: Kenneth Adam
- Children: 4, including Corinna Adam
- Writing career
- Language: English

Ruth Augusta Adam, née King (14 December 1907 – 3 February 1977), was an English journalist and writer of novels, comics and non-fiction feminist literature.

== Early life ==
She was born on 14 December 1907 in Arnold, Nottinghamshire, daughter of Annie Margaret (née Wearing) and Rupert William King, a vicar of the Church of England. She attended St Elphin's girls' boarding school in Darley Dale, Derbyshire, from 1920 to 1925.

== Career ==
In 1925, she became a teacher in elementary schools in impoverished mining areas of Nottinghamshire.

Her first novel, War On Saturday Week, dealt with political extremism in Britain during the years leading up to the Second World War. Her second novel, I'm Not Complaining (1938), depicted women's lives in the Depression from the point of view of an unmarried female teacher. She worked for the Ministry of Information during the Second World War, and wrote radio scripts, including some for Woman's Hour, which started on BBC radio in 1946. From 1944 to 1976 she wrote the women's page for the Church of England Newspaper, which expressed her position as a Christian socialist feminist. One such article, "Comics and Shockers" in 1948, put her on the same page as Marcus Morris, whose religious ideals and concerns about the influence of American comics led him to launch Eagle in 1950, and Girl the following year. Adam wrote strips for Girl, in which she attempted to counteract the passiveness of many girls' heroines by introducing young female characters who were resourceful, brave and clever. Her best-known strip was "Susan of St. Bride's" (1954–61), about a student nurse, who also featured in spin-off novels written by Adam. She also wrote "Lindy Love" (1954–55), about a girl just out of school who has to care for her family, drawn by Peter Kay.

In 1955 she and Peggy Jay founded the Fisher Group, a think-tank advising governments on social policy. She wrote twelve novels, including two about girls in care, Fetch Her Away (1954) and Look Who's Talking (1960), and A House in the Country (1957), a comic novel based on her family's attempt to live in a commune, as well as biographies of George Bernard Shaw and Beatrice Webb, the latter co-written with Kitty Muggeridge. The 1951 film The Quiet Woman was based on a story by Adam, and Look Who's Talking was adapted for television as part of the BBC's Studio 4 series in 1962. Her final book, A Woman's Place: 1910-1975, a social history of women in the 20th century, was published in 1975. She died at the Hospital of St John and St Elizabeth, Marylebone, London, on 3 February 1977.

== Personal life ==
In 1932, she married Kenneth Adam, a journalist on the Manchester Guardian and later director of BBC television. They had four children: three sons and one daughter, the journalist Corinna Adam, later Corinna Ascherson.

== Selected works ==
- War On Saturday Week (1937)
- I'm Not Complaining (1938) (Reprinted by Virago Press in 1983)
- There Needs No Ghost (1939)
- Murder in the Home Guard (1942) An experiment with the murder novel formula, where Adam presents a murder as seen from a series of different viewpoints.
- The Quiet Woman (1951 film) (co-written with John Gilling)
- Fetch Her Away (1954) A novel about the effect of family breakdown on a little girl and the intervention of the State in her life. Dedicated to Peggy Jay.
- House in the Country (1957)
- Look Who's Talking (1960)
- Beatrice Webb: A Life 1858-1943 (with Kitty Muggeridge, 1967)
- A Woman's Place: 1910-1975 (1975) (Reprinted by Persephone Books in 2000)
