= Calder Walton =

Author and historian

- Born: James Calder Walton

Academic background
- Education: Trinity College, Cambridge, (PhD)
- Thesis: British intelligence and threats to national security, c.1941-1951 (2006)
- Doctoral advisor: Christopher Andrew

Academic work
- Discipline: Historian
- Sub-discipline: History of espionage
- Institutions: Harvard University, Cambridge University
- Website: calderwalton.com

James Calder Walton is an Anglo-American expert on the history of espionage, intelligence, and national security. He is currently assistant director of the Intelligence Project at Harvard University's Belfer Center. He is general editor of the multi-volume Cambridge History of Espionage and Intelligence. Walton has been sanctioned by Russia in connection with the Russo-Ukrainian War.

== Publications ==
=== Books ===
While on a junior research fellowship at Cambridge University, Walton was a lead researcher for Christopher Andrew's official history of the British Security Service (MI5), The Defence of the Realm (2009). The position gave Calder six years of privileged access to MI5 archives.

Walton's first book, Empire of Secrets: British Intelligence, the Cold War and the Twilight of Empire (2013), covered post-war British intelligence activities. It was reviewed favorably in The Journal of Imperial and Commonwealth History and won the Longman–History Today Book of the Year prize for 2014.

An exposé of the history of Russian intelligence, Walton's second book Spies: The Epic Intelligence War between East and West (2023) received favorable reviews from Graham Allison, Fiona Hill, Fredrik Logevall, Lawrence Freedman in Foreign Affairs, and Paul Kolbe, former CIA Chief of Central Eurasian Division, who called it "the definitive compendium of intelligence operations in the Cold War".

=== Periodicals ===
Walton's work has been published widely including in Foreign Affairs, Foreign Policy, CNN, Time Magazine, The New York Times, The Washington Post, The Sunday Times, POLITICO, Newsweek, Prospect Magazine, the BBC, NPR, PBS, C-SPAN, Fox News, NewsNation, and academic peer reviewed journals such as Intelligence & National Security and the Texas National Security Review.
