= Kenneth Adam =

English journalist and broadcasting executive (1908–1978)

Kenneth Adam CBE FRSA
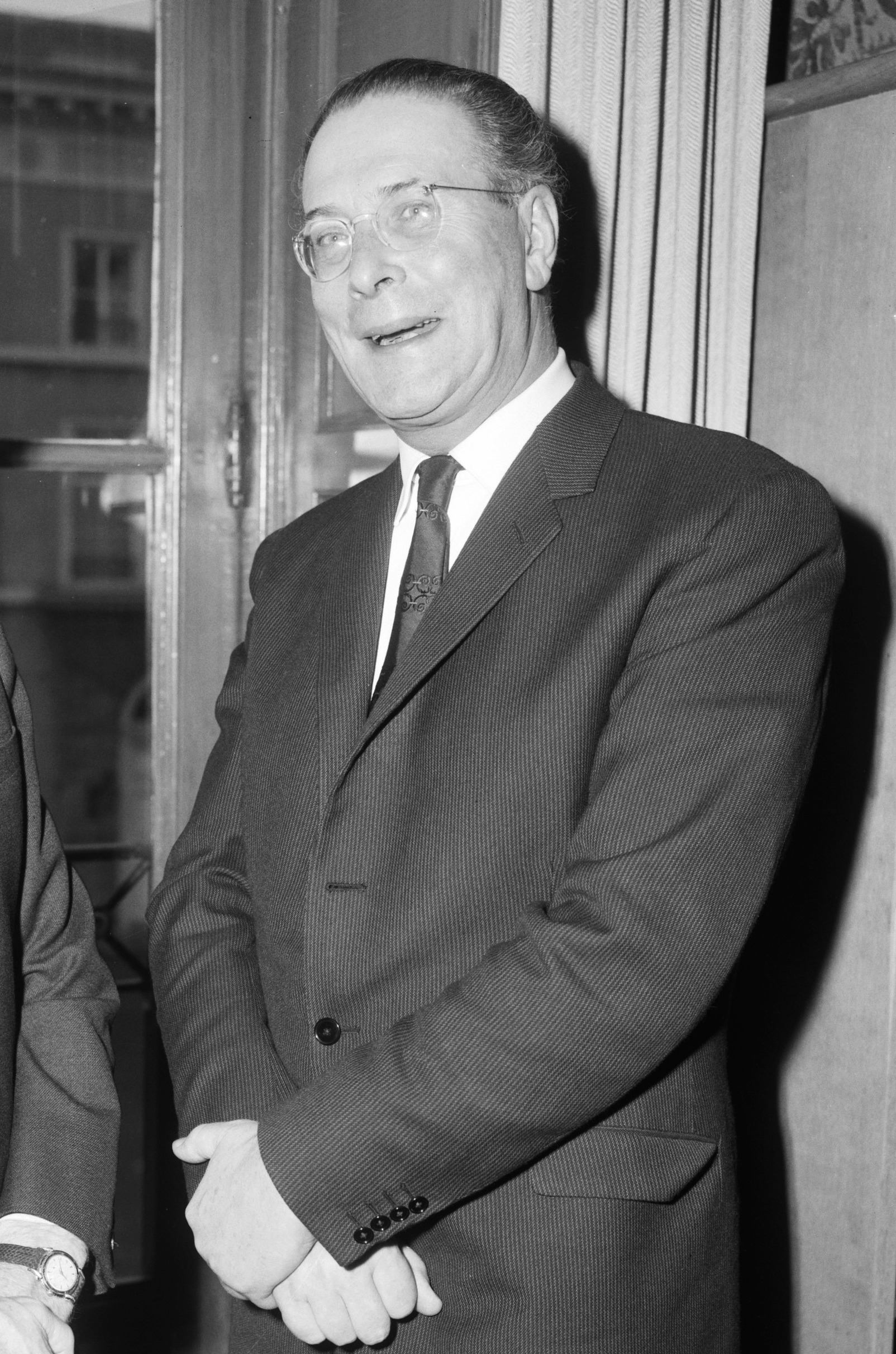
- Adam in 1962
- Born: 1 March 1908; Nottingham, England
- Died: 18 October 1978 (aged 70)
- Education: Nottingham High School; St John's College, Cambridge
- Title: Controller of BBC Television Service (1957–1961)
- Spouse: Ruth King (m. 1932; died 1977)
- Children: 4, including Corinna

Kenneth Adam CBE FRSA (1 March 1908 – 18 October 1978) was an English journalist and broadcasting executive, who from 1957 until 1961 served as the Controller of the BBC Television Service.

== Early life and education ==
He was born in Nottingham. After attending Nottingham High School, Adam read history at St John's College, Cambridge, and graduated with a first-class degree. While at St John's he was both President of the Union and President of the University Liberal Club. After graduating, he joined the staff of the Manchester Guardian newspaper as a journalist at the age of just twenty-two. While working for the Guardian he also began working as a freelance broadcaster for BBC radio in Manchester, leaving the newspaper to join the BBC full-time in 1934 as a Home News Editor.

== Print journalism ==
Adam stayed in radio for just two years before returning to the world of print journalism, joining The Star in 1936. He worked for the paper as a special correspondent until 1940, when due to the journalistic restrictions of the Second World War he temporarily left the industry to become the press officer for the British Overseas Airways Corporation. His time at BOAC was short-lived, however, as in 1941 he re-joined the staff of the BBC, this time serving as its Head of Publicity.

== Broadcasting ==
Adam spent nine years in this role, before in 1950 the Director-General of the BBC, William Haley, took the perhaps surprising decision to appoint him as the Controller of the BBC Light Programme, one of the BBC's most popular national radio stations. Adam took up the post at the end of the year and successfully ran the station for the next four years, although he apparently became frustrated at the lack of opportunities to move across into the newer medium of television, which was his latest ambition.

Perhaps due to this frustration, in 1955 he once more decided to leave the BBC, and indeed the full-time broadcasting industry as a whole, joining Hulton Press as the company's Joint General Manager. This finally enabled him to make the move in television with the BBC's commercial competitor, ITV, as he returned to appearing on the airwaves rather than behind the scenes, becoming a chairman of the programme Free Speech. He also appeared occasionally on other television programmes, as well as on various BBC radio programmes. In February 1957 he returned once again to the BBC to succeed Cecil McGivern as the Controller of Programmes at the BBC Television Service. He occupied this post for four years until 1961, when he was promoted to become the BBC's overall Director of Television. He remained in this role until 1968, when he reached the BBC's compulsory retirement age of sixty.

== Later years ==
Following his retirement he often lectured on broadcasting matters at seminars in the United States, being made Visiting Professor of Communications at Temple University, Philadelphia. He also wrote a frank series of articles on his time at the BBC for the Sunday Times newspaper in 1969, and in later years was variously a Governor of Charing Cross Hospital; of the British Film Institute; a member of the councils of the National Youth Theatre; the Tavistock Institute; the British Travel Association and Industrial Design. In 1962 he had been awarded the CBE, and he was a Fellow of the Royal Society of Arts.

He was married to his wife, Ruth, from 1932 to her death in 1977. They had three sons and a daughter, the journalist Corinna Adam (later Ascherson), all of whom survived him.

Media offices
Preceded by Cecil McGivern	Controller of BBC Television Service; 1957–1961	Succeeded by Stuart Hood
