= Corinna Adam =

English journalist

Corinna Jane Adam
- Corinna Adam
- Born: 31 January 1937; Hampstead, London, England
- Died: 8 March 2012 (aged 75); Kentish Town, London, England
- Other name: Corinna Ascherson
- Occupations: Journalist (New Statesman, The Guardian, The Observer)

Corinna Jane Adam (31 January 1937 – 8 March 2012), also known by her married name Corinna Ascherson, was a British journalist, particularly for the New Statesman, The Guardian, and The Observer. According to her obituary in The Times, Adam was "admired for her shrewd and well-observed reporting on a wide range of subjects, not least of court cases relating to questions of freedom of expression and human rights."

== Early life ==
Adam was born on 31 January 1937 at 40B Rosslyn Hill, Hampstead, London, the daughter of Kenneth Adam (1908–1978), a journalist and the first director of BBC Television, and his wife, Ruth Augusta Adam, née King (1907–1977), a feminist writer. Adam was educated at Ashford Girls' School, followed by a degree from Cambridge University in economics (having changed subject from French and Spanish) having studied at Girton College, Cambridge.

== Career ==
Throughout the 1960s and 1970s, Adam wrote on a wide range of subjects for the New Statesman rising to associate editor, The Guardian, and The Observer.

Working for the New Statesman, her closest friends were "the three Marys", Mary Kenny, Mary Holland, and Mary Morgan.

== Personal life ==
On 20 November 1958, she married fellow journalist Neal Ascherson at St Bride's Church, Fleet Street, London. They had two daughters, Marina, a musician (born 1960), and Isobel, a criminal barrister (born 1964). They separated in 1974, and divorced in 1982. She began a 30-year relationship with fellow New Statesman journalist Anthony Howard, but Howard never left his wife.

== Later life ==
Adam died on 8 March 2012, in a fire at her home in Rhyl Street, Kentish Town, north London, and was survived by her two daughters. Eight fire crews fought the fire, which "may have been started by a lit cigarette".
