= Alan Allport =

British historian

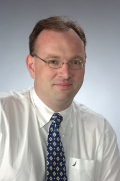
- Born: 1970 (age 55–56); Whiston, United Kingdom
- Education: University of Pennsylvania (PhD)
- Occupation: Historian

Alan Allport (born 1970) is a British historian whose work looks at the relationship between war and society during the period of the two world wars. He was born in Whiston, Merseyside and moved to the United States in 1994. Allport received a Ph.D. in history from the University of Pennsylvania in 2007 and currently teaches at Syracuse University.

== Books ==
His first book Demobbed: Coming Home After the Second World War, a study of the post-1945 military demobilisation experience in Britain, was published by Yale University Press in 2009 and won the 2010 Longman-History Today Book of the Year Award. His second book, Browned Off and Bloody-Minded: The British Soldier goes to War 1939-1945 was published, also by Yale, in 2015. In 2020 he completed the first in a two-part history of Britain in the Second World War, Britain at Bay 1938-1941 , which was published by Profile Books in the UK and Knopf in North America.
