= Fay Bound Alberti =

British cultural historian

Fay Bound-Alberti (born 1971) is a British writer and cultural historian of gender, emotion and medicine. Since 2023 she has been Professor of Modern History and UKRI Future Leaders Fellow at King's College London, where she is PI of Interface and Director of the Centre for Technology and the Body. She was previously Professor of Modern History at the University of York. Bound-Alberti is a Fellow of the Royal Historical Society (FRHistS) and previously Foundation Future Leader at the Foundation for Science and Technology.

== Career ==
Bound-Alberti has taught at several British universities including the Open University, University of Lancaster, the University of Manchester and University College London and was one of the founders of the Centre for the History of Emotions at Queen Mary University. She was Head of philanthropy for the Arcadia Foundation, the charitable foundation of Lisbet Rausing and Peter Baldwin, and head of medical humanities grants at the Wellcome Trust. In 2019 she was named by the MP Chris Skidmore as one of the first UK Research and Innovation Future Leaders Fellows, to pursue her research into the cultural history and emotions of face transplants as part of the AboutFace project. She took up this post at the University of York, where she was Professor in History. In 2023, Bound-Alberti joined King's College London as Professor of Modern History and Director of the Centre for Technology and the Body.

== Writing and media ==
Fay Bound-Alberti has written works regarding history, medicine, and emotion. Her books include Matters of the Heart: History, Medicine, and Emotion (2010), This Mortal Coil: The Human Body in History and Culture (2016), and A Biography of Loneliness: the history of an Emotion. Matters of the Heart was shortlisted for the Longman-History Today Award for Book of the Year, and This Mortal Coil was a finalist for the BSHS Dingle Prize.

Bound-Alberti has written for The F-Word feminist blog and for Open Democracy She has written several articles on loneliness for Aeon Magazine, The Conversation and The Guardian newspaper and is a reviewer for the Times Literary Supplement.

Bound-Alberti has appeared on several television and radio programmes to discuss her work.

Since 2022, Bound-Alberti has written about the ethics of facial transplantation as a form of Vascularized Composite Allografts (VCA). Based on the findings of a seven-year research project, Bound-Alberti published a review of the field of face transplants 20 years on in The Guardian.

== Selected publications ==
- The Face: A Cultural History. Allen Lane and Hachette. 2026. ISBN 978-0-24-167071-2.
- A Biography of Loneliness: The history of an emotion. Oxford University press. 2019. ISBN 9780198811343.
- Matters of the Heart: History, Medicine, and Emotion. Oxford University Press. 2010. ISBN 978-0-19-160917-6.
- This Mortal Coil: The Human Body in History and Culture. Oxford University Press. 2016. ISBN 978-0-19-979339-6.
