= Black Sea (book) =

Book by Neal Ascherson

- Author: Neal Ascherson
- Language: English
- Genre: Non-fiction
- Publication date: 1995

Black Sea is a non-fiction book of travel and history by the Scottish writer Neal Ascherson. Its subject is the Black Sea and its surrounding lands. On its publication in 1995, the book received high praise from critics such as Richard Bernstein, Timothy Garton Ash, Karl Miller and Noel Malcolm. Black Sea won the Saltire Award for Literature in 1995 and the Los Angeles Times Book Award for History in 1996.
