= Neal Ascherson =

Scottish journalist and writer (born 1932)

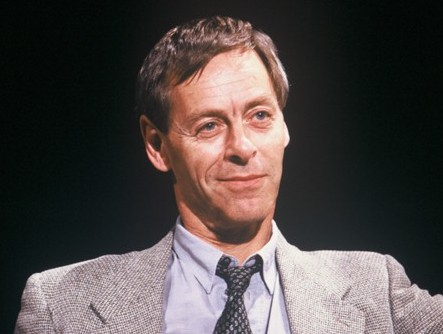
- Neal Ascherson on After Dark in 1987
- Born: Charles Neal Ascherson; 5 October 1932 (age 94); Edinburgh, Scotland
- Education: King's College, Cambridge
- Occupations: Journalist, writer, academic
- Years active: 1950s–present
- Notable work: Black Sea (1995)
- Spouse(s): Corinna Adam (m. 1958; div. 1982) Isabel Hilton (m. 1984)
- Children: 4
- Relatives: Renée Asherson (aunt)

Charles Neal Ascherson (born 5 October 1932) is a Scottish journalist and writer. In his youth he fought for the British in the Malayan Emergency. He has been described by Radio Prague as "one of Britain's leading experts on central and eastern Europe". Ascherson is the author of several books on the history of Poland and Ukraine. His work has appeared in The Guardian and The New York Review of Books.

== Early life ==
Ascherson was born in Edinburgh on 5 October 1932, the son of a naval officer of Jewish ancestry and a mother from a London family of Scottish descent; his elder half-sister (by his father's first marriage) was the artist Pamela Ascherson. His aunt was the actress Renée Asherson.

Neal was awarded a scholarship to Eton.

=== Military service ===
Before going to university, Ascherson did his National Service as an officer in the Royal Marines, serving from July 1951 to September 1952. During this time, he fought in the Malayan Emergency against pro-independence and communist guerrillas belonging to the Malayan National Liberation Army. During the Malayan Emergency he witnessed the racial oppression of the native people at the hands of British forces, and once claimed to have seen a communist guerrilla shot dead while vainly attempting to save another wounded communist during a gunfight. These experiences later pushed him towards anti-imperialist politics.

=== University education ===
Ascherson attended King's College, Cambridge, where he studied history. The Marxist historian Eric Hobsbawm was his supervisor at Cambridge, and described Ascherson as "perhaps the most brilliant student I ever had. I didn't really teach him much, I just let him get on with it."

== Career ==
After graduating Ascherson declined offers to pursue an academic career. Instead, he chose a career in journalism, first at The Manchester Guardian and then at The Scotsman (1959–60; 1975–79), The Observer (1960–75; 1979–90) and The Independent on Sunday (1990–98). He contributed scripts for the documentary series The World at War (1973–74) and the Cold War (1998). He has also been a regular contributor to the London Review of Books.

Ascherson has occasionally been actively involved in politics. In 1976, while working as the Scottish political correspondent for The Scotsman, he joined the newly-founded Scottish Labour Party (SLP), a breakaway faction which was led out of the UK Labour Party by the MP Jim Sillars following disagreements over the party's policy on Scottish devolution. Ascherson, like Sillars an enthusiastic supporter of maximalist 'Home Rule', provided much favourable coverage of the new party, but the SLP was riven by internal dissension and was wound up after the 1979 general election. Twenty years later, in the first election for the Scottish Parliament, he stood as the Liberal Democrat candidate in the West Renfrewshire constituency but was not successful. Ascherson supported the "Yes" (pro-independence) campaign in the 2014 Scottish independence referendum.

Ascherson has also lectured and written extensively about Polish and Eastern Europe affairs.As of 2016 he is a visiting professor at the Institute of Archaeology, University College London. He has been editor of Public Archaeology, an academic journal associated with UCL devoted to CRM and public archaeology issues and developments, since its inception in 1999.

== Awards and honours ==
In 1991 Ascherson was awarded an honorary degree from the Open University as Doctor of the University. In 2011 he was elected Honorary Fellow of the Society of Antiquaries of Scotland.

== Personal life ==
Neal Ascherson's first wife was journalist Corinna Adam; the couple first met at Cambridge University and married in 1958. They had two daughters together before separating in 1974. The couple divorced in 1982. Corinna Ascherson, also a journalist, died in March 2012.

In 1984, Ascherson married his second wife, journalist Isabel Hilton. The couple currently live in London and have two children.

== Bibliography ==
- Ascherson, Neal (1963). The King Incorporated: Leopold the Second and the Congo. ISBN 1-86207-290-6.
- Ascherson, Neal (1981). The Polish August: The Self-limiting Revolution. ISBN 0-670-56305-6.
- Ascherson, Neal (1982). The Book of Lech Wałęsa. ISBN 0-671-45684-9.
- The Spanish Civil War (Granada Television serial script, 1983)
- Linklater, Magnus; Hilton, Isabel; Ascherson, Neal (1984). The Nazi Legacy. ISBN 0-03-069303-9. with Magnus Linklater and Isabel Hilton
- Ascherson, Neal (1987). The Struggles For Poland. ISBN 0-7181-2812-5.
- Ascherson, Neal (1988). Games With Shadows. ISBN 0-09-173019-8.
- Ascherson, Neal (1995). Black Sea. ISBN 0-8090-3043-8.
- Ascherson, Neal (2002). Stone Voices: The Search for Scotland. ISBN 0-8090-8491-0.
- Opposition to Turkey's Ilisu Dam rises again with Maggie Ronayne, published 27 November 2007, chinadialogue
- Ascherson, Neal (2017). Death of the Fronsac: A Novel. ISBN 978-1786694379.
