= Wang Shiwei =

Chinese journalist

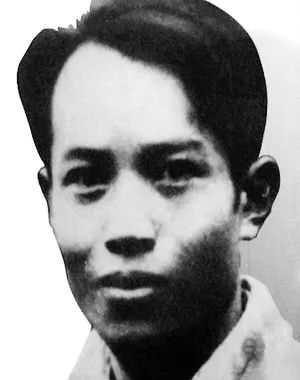
- Born: March 12, 1906; Guangzhou, Henan, China
- Died: July 1, 1947 (aged 41)

Wang Shiwei (traditional Chinese: 王實味; simplified Chinese: 王实味; pinyin: Wáng Shíwèi; Wade–Giles: Wang Shih-wei; March 12, 1906 – July 1, 1947) was a Chinese journalist and literary writer. He is known for his contribution to the Chinese history of modern revolution and to Chinese modern literature. Wang joined the Chinese Communist Party (CCP) in 1926, but later wrote critically of some aspects of the Chinese Communist Revolution. Under order from Mao Zedong, he was expelled from the CCP. Later in 1947, he was executed.

== Biography ==
=== Family ===
Wang Shiwei, originally named Wang Sidao (王思禱), was born in Guangzhou (光州, now Huangchuan County) in Henan Province, China on March 12, 1906. His courtesy name was Shuhan (叔翰). His father was a scholar who worked as a teacher in a local school. Wang was the third eldest child in a family of eight brothers and sisters. His father's income as a teacher was not sufficient to sustain the large family.

=== Education ===
Wang received his initial education in Chinese classics from his father, which began the development of his knowledge of Chinese literature. In 1914, he entered Huangchuan Second Higher Primary school (潢川第二高等小學) for primary three education. Later, he went to Henan Seventh Secondary School located in Huangchuan (now Huangchuan 2nd Middle School, 潢川第二中學). He eventually left his hometown and entered the Fundamental School of Europe. He was forced to leave this school a year later, as his family could no longer afford the costly fees. Determined to further his studies, he worked in a post office to save money; at the age of 17, he joined the American Exchange Studies program in Henan Province.

In 1925, Wang got a chance to study arts at Peking University. There he actively participated in the university's student campaigns. However, he was once again forced to quit in 1927, but was again able to start studying during the late 1920s and early 1930s, this time at the Marx-Engels Institute in Moscow. While at Peking University, his schoolmates included communist activists Chen Qichang and Wang Fanxi, Chen possibly being the one who introduced the Chinese Communist Party to Wang Shiwei. Chen and Wang Fanxi, however, broke with the CCP and joined Trotskyists. Wang Shiwei's early association with the two later became part of the accusation by Kang Sheng that he was a crypto-Trotskyist.

=== Involvement in politics ===
Wang was an active participant in political activity. In 1919, Wang and his classmates joined the May Fourth Movement demonstrations in support of Beijing students. Entering Beijing University in 1925, he participated in student politics and joined the CCP in 1926. Leaving a year later, for the criticism of his love affair with Li Fen (李芬), who was also a communist member. However, he rejoined the CCP when Mao Zedong became the chairman. During his studies in Moscow, Wang formed the Twenty-Eight Bolsheviks together with other Chinese students such as Wang Ming and Ding Ling.

== Imprisonment and execution ==
By 1942, Wang was working for the Liberation Daily (解放日報) where he wrote the essay "Wild Lilies" (野百合花), criticizing Mao Zedong's taste for beautiful women, as well as what he called the unjustified privileges enjoyed by members of the CCP. It discussed the "ugliness and indifference" of Yan'an; also criticizing some "big men" in the CCP whom Wang thought were responsible for the "growth of darkness" in China.

The article caused significant backlash. Mao's Talks at the Yan'an Forum in May laid down the official line demanding that art serve politics. On 27 May 1942, the Central Committee held a seminar to discuss whether Wang was guilty. On 23 October, under the orders of Mao, Wang was expelled from the CCP on the oncharge that he was one of the "Five Member Anti-Party Gang" of Trotskyites (托派份子) who were alleged to have sought to take over the Chinese Communist Party, and that he was disrupting party unity.

Wang's defense was that he was not involved in any Trotskyist activities, except for helping his friends Wang Wenyuan (王文元) and Chen Qichang (who at the time was known as "Chen Qingchen" 陳清晨) to translate two prose pieces in "Autobiography of Leon Trotsky" (托洛茨基自傳), activities which he had already informed the CCP of.

Wang's "trial," which took the form of a series of struggle sessions held over sixteen days, ended in June 1942 with Wang found guilty and imprisoned. During the trial, he was denounced by figures such as Ding Ling, Chen Boda, and Ai Qing. He remained imprisoned until his execution five years later.

On 1 July 1947, Wang was reportedly chopped to pieces and his remains were thrown down a dry well. Chinese journalist Dai Qing states that Mao did not order the execution, but told his guards: "Neither release nor execute Wang Shiwei."

Fifteen years later, in 1962, Mao said that while Wang was an agent of the Kuomintang, he should not have been executed. Mao claimed that the decision to execute Wang was made by local security organs, not the central leadership.

Dai Qing's seminal work in exhuming the case of the writer Wang Shiwei brings into focus perhaps the single most important case for gauging repressive dimensions of the movement.

== Wang as a writer ==
Wang began writing at the age of 19, when he was studying at Beijing University. He took the pen name of "Shiwei" (實味), and his talent was greatly appreciated by Xu Zhimo, a contemporary Chinese poet. Xu often ran Wang's writings in the Features section of the Morning Post when he was editor-in-chief.

From 1930 onwards he started to use other pen names, still pronounced "Shiwei" but using different characters (詩薇 and 石巍). His novella Xiuxi (休息, meaning "rest"), talked about how young people should fight against the darkness of a country and was published in Xu Zhimo's "New Literary Collection" in 1930. His work outlined an "ideal society" where equality of opportunity was emphasized; he also incorporated some Marxist thought.

=== "Wild Lilies" ===
Wang attempted to demonstrate two basic elements of journalism in "Wild Lilies."

The first was that "its practitioners must be allowed to exercise their personal conscience." An example used to illustrate this is how one day Wang overheard two girls criticizing the apparently inconsiderate behavior of senior leaders towards the public. He later wrote that he was shocked after overhearing the dialogue, and took note of it, later referring to it to make known his concern about the state of the country. He was supposed to have "finally realized" what was lacking in everybody's life at that time, and attempted to dig further to what was behind the complaints.

The second was that "it must provide a forum for public criticism." Wang explained that his piece of work was called "Wild Lilies" because wild lilies grew abundantly in Yan'an, could stand symbolically for the place and because they had higher medical value than other lilies, though they were bitter to taste, and in this connection criticized unhealthy phenomena in society so remedies could be found. This was also not so discreetly attempting to turn a remark from Mao Zedong on its head. Explaining the crackdown on freedom of expression, Mao said that the CCP's actions were "like that of a doctor curing a disease. The whole purpose is to save people, not to cure them to death." His work was criticised by others and between April and May 1942 "Wild Lilies" was attacked in the newspapers.

=== "Arrow and Target" ===
"Arrow and Target" (矢与的) was a wall poster newspaper series posted outside the southern gate of Yan'an City. Wang used the series to elaborate on the concept of journalism that "Its first loyalty is to citizens." Wang uses the spaces provided in the newspaper series to attack Li Weihan (also known as Luo Mai), the director of the Central research Institute. He told every citizen that injustices were present. This act certainly destroyed the image of the institute. Instead of defending the institute, which he was quite closely connected with, in his column, he alleged to tell the citizens things that they wanted to know, things that were beneficial to them. He is loyal to citizens more than the business owners and advertisers. Therefore, Wang's first loyalty was to citizens.

=== Influence ===
Wang's works allowed readers, particularly those of Yan'an, to gain a better understanding of issues like the relationship between politics and literature. Partly as a reaction against the Chinese literature that focused too much on the rules of the CCP in the 1940s, Wang's work alerted some to the fact that the education on the rules of the CCP were not practical. He was the first writer in Yan'an who gave a theoretical reflection on reality in his works; in his "Wild Lilies", for example, the bureaucracy and hierarchy of Yan'an were described in vivid detail.

"While it is tempting to characterize the trial of Wang Shiwei as an illustration of the fate awaiting free-thinking intellectuals in a repressive state, it is clear from the questions raised in the first session that the Wang Shiwei trial epitomizes the difficulty of voicing a minority opinion, especially when that opinion is pitted against a more powerful entity such as the state."

Apart from that, literature in that period emphasized on the skills of writing. There was little concern about the reality. Western literatures were very much appreciated. However, because of the successful and interesting reflection of reality in Wang's works, people started to appreciate Chinese literature. Many Chinese writers also began to write more about the reality, examining on the local arts and the Marxist ideas.

Wang's eagerness to voice out the inequalities and his critical mind contributed to his success as one of the most representative writers in the period. He also stimulated other writers to think about what they should write about from that onwards.

== Timeline ==
- 1906 March 12 – Born in Huangchuan, Henan (潢川, 河南).
- 1914 – Entered Primary 3 at Huangchuan Second Higher Elementary school (潢川第二高等小學)
- 1920 – Studied at Henan Seventh Middle School, Huangchuan (河南省立第七中學堂,潢川)
- 1923 – Admitted into Henan's Europe and America Preparatory School (河南省留學歐美預備學校) (Henan University predecessor), majored in English.
- 1924 – Worked at the Henan Province Postal Service Administrative Bureau as a postal officer
- 1925 – Admitted into Beijing University Literary Academy Preparatory course. Finished his short novel, Xiuxi (休息)
- 1926
  - January – Joined the CCP.
  - February 27 – Wrote a short novel, Yang wu nainai (楊五奶奶) published in "Chenbao Fukan" (晨報副刊)
  - July – Another publication, Hui mie de jing shen (毀滅的精神) in "The Modern Critics" (現代評論).
- 1927 – Separated from the party organization because he was in love with a communist member, Li Fan (李芬). Then he went to places such as Nanjing (南京), Shandong Tai'an (山東泰安), worked as a copy clerk and teacher.
- 1929
  - January – Went to Shanghai, engaged in the translation of literary works. And he met his first wife, Liu ying (劉瑩). Wrote the novel "The Story of Chenlaosi" (陳老四的故事).
  - February – Another novel of his "The Little Tall Boy and Canned Lychee" (小長兒與罐頭荔枝) was published in "The Crescent" (新月).
- 1930
  - January – Married Liuying.
  - April – His novel, Xiuxi (休息) and his first translation work "The Heretic of Soana"(珊拿的邪教徒) were published in Xu Zhimo's (徐志摩) "New literary collection".
- 1931 January – Daughter, Wang Chingfeng (王勁楓) was born.
- 1933 – Translation work "Sapho" (薩芙) was published.
- 1935 July – Son, Wang Hsufeng (王旭楓) was born. Returned to Henan Kaifeng (河南開封) and was an English teacher at Province Female Middle School (省立女子中學).
- 1936 – Translation work "Strange interlude" (奇異的插曲) and "The Man of Property" (資產家) were published in "The World's Literary Collections" (世界文學全集)
- 1937 – Rejoined the CCP. Translation work "The Return of the Native" (還鄉記) was published in "The World's Literary Collections".
- 1938 October – Due to Changsha Siege (長沙淪陷), he lost contact with his wife who was in Xiang Xi (湘西)
- 1939 – Married his second wife, Baoping (薄平)
- 1941 August – Assigned as a special researcher at Central Research Institute (中央研究院)
- 1942
  - March – Published his work, Ye bai he hua (野百合花) in People's Liberation Army Daily (解放日報) and Zheng zhi jia, Yi Shu jia (政治家·藝術家).
  - April – Mao Zedong criticized his work as anti-Communist. He was then asked to attend the Symposium about his "anti-Communist" work in "Yen'an" (延安).
  - October – He was expelled from the CCP.
- 1943 April 1 – Kang Sheng (康生) gave an order to arrest him. He was claimed as the "Counter-revolutionary Trotskyist spy" (反革命托派奸细分子), "Undercover agent of Kuomintang" (暗藏的國民黨特務) and "Five-people anti-party group" (五人反黨集團).
- 1947 July 1 – Wang Shiwei was secretly executed. Died at the age of 41.

== Works ==
Most of Wang's literary works remained unpublished until the late 20th century. His style of writing was described as "having the energy and power to enrich humanity" (有著蓬勃人性之熱與力).

His works reflected his sincerity and love towards his home country and native homeland. He felt compassion for the weak and oppressed in society. He had always hoped that he could change society through revolution, which is why his works were so critical.

Articles

- 文藝民族形式問题上的錯誤舆新偏向, 1941
- 野百合花 (Ye Baihehua) / (Wild Lilies), 1942, People's Liberation Army Daily
- 政治家·藝術家, 1942 (Zhengzhijia, Yishujia) / (Politicians, Artists), Journal of Yan'an's Literacy Resistance Association, Spring Rain (Gu Yu), Vol. 1:4
- 零感两則, 1942, Arrow and Target
- 我對羅邁(別名李维漢)同志在整風檢工動員大會上發言的批評, 1942, Arrow and Target
- 答李宇超、梅洛兩同志, 1942, Arrow and Target

Novels

- 楊五奶奶, 1926 (Yang Wu Nainai)
- 毀滅的精神, 1926 (Huimie de Jingshen)
- 陳老四的故事, 1929 (Chenlaoshi de Gushi)
- 小長兒與罐頭荔枝, 1929 (Xiao Zhanger Yu Guantou Lizhi)
- 休息, 1930 (Xiuxi) / (Rest)
- 鬥爭日記, 1942 (Douzheng Riji)

Translations

Wang translated many works into Chinese, including those by Karl Marx and Eugene O'Neill.

- The Heretic of Soana (珊拿的邪教徒) by Gerhart Hauptmann, 1930
- Sapho (薩芙) by Alphonse Daudet, 1933
- The Man of Property (資產家) by John Galsworthy, 1936
- Strange Interlude (奇異的插曲) by O'Neill Eugene, 1936
- The Return of the Native (還鄉記) by Thomas Hardy, 1937
- Revolution and Counter-Revolution in Germany (德國的革命與反革命) by Friedrich Engels, 1937
- Value, Price and Profit (价格、价值和利潤) by Karl Marx, 1937
- The Water Babies (水孩子) by Charles Kingsley
