= Socialism in one country =

Political theory by Joseph Stalin

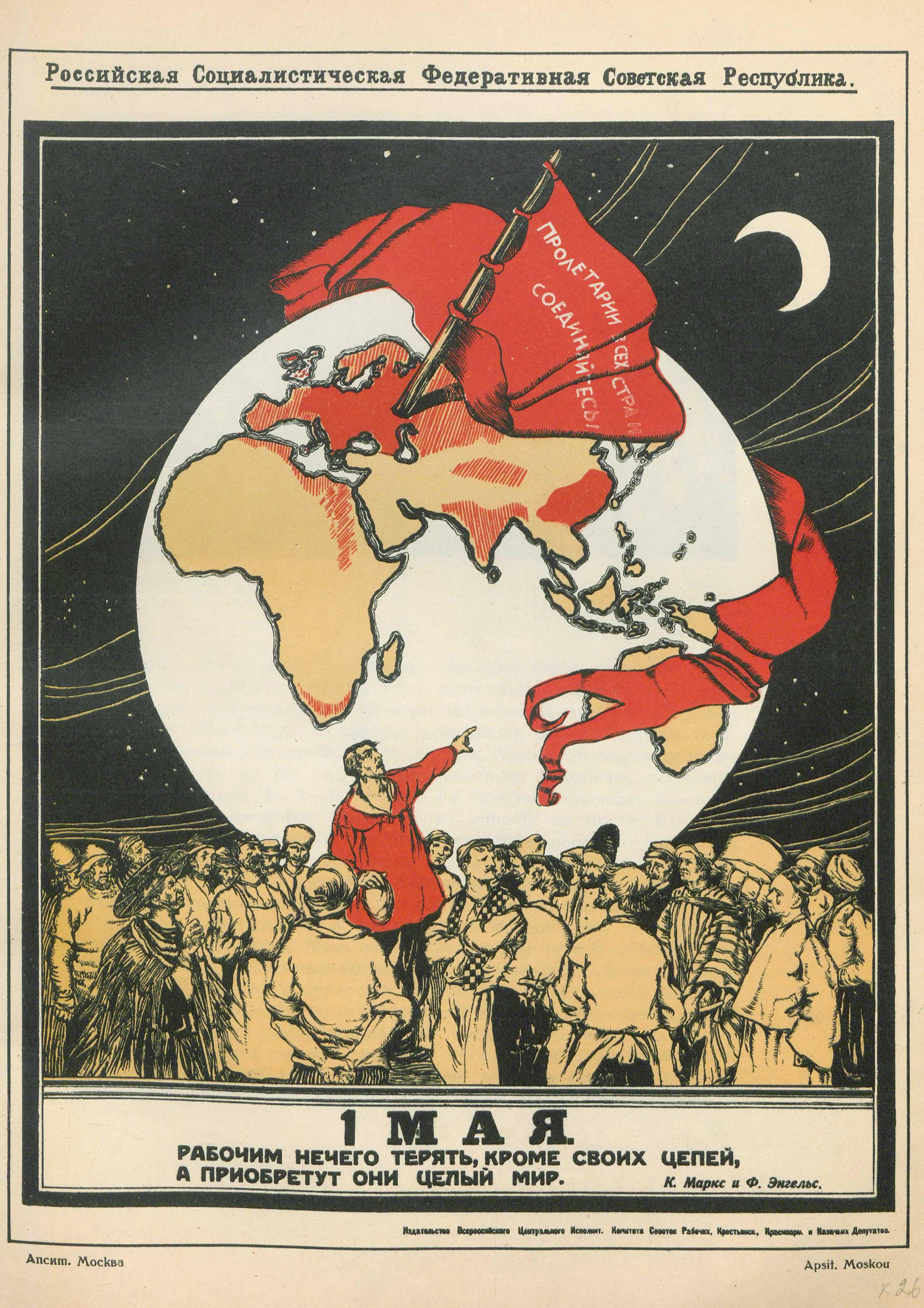
1st of May, "The workers have nothing to lose but their chains, they have a world to win!".

Socialism in one country (Note: Russian: социализм в отдельно взятой стране, romanized: sotsializm v otdelno vzyatoy strane, lit. 'socialism in a single country') was a Soviet state policy to strengthen socialism within the USSR rather than socialism globally. Given the defeats of the 1917–1923 European communist revolutions, (Note: Apart from Russia's October Revolution) Joseph Stalin encouraged the theory of the possibility of constructing socialism in the Soviet Union alone. The theory was eventually adopted as Soviet state policy.

As a political theory, its exponents argue that it contradicts neither world revolution nor world communism. The theory opposes Leon Trotsky's theory of permanent revolution and the communist left's theory of world revolution.

Initially, all leading Soviet figures including Stalin agreed that the success of world socialism was a precondition for the survival of the Soviet Union. Stalin expressed this view in his pamphlet, "Foundations of Leninism." However, he would later change this position in December 1924 during the succession struggle against Trotsky and the Left Opposition.

The theory was criticized by Trotsky and Grigory Zinoviev as antithetical to Marxist principles while the theoretical framework was supported by Nikolai Bukharin.

== Background ==
The defeat of several proletarian revolutions in countries like Germany and Hungary ended Bolsheviks' hopes for an imminent world revolution and prompted them to focus on developing socialism in the Soviet Union alone, as advocated by Joseph Stalin. In the first edition of The Foundations of Leninism (1924), Stalin was still a follower of the classical Marxist idea that revolution in one country is insufficient. Vladimir Lenin died in January 1924 and by the end of that year in the second edition of the book Stalin's position started to turn around as he claimed that "the proletariat can and must build the socialist society in one country".

In April 1925, Nikolai Bukharin elaborated the issue in his pamphlet Can We Build Socialism in One Country in the Absence of the Victory of the West-European Proletariat? and the Soviet Union adopted socialism in one country as state policy after Stalin's January 1926 article On the Issues of Leninism. 1925–1926 signaled a shift in the immediate activity of the Communist International from world revolution towards a defense of the Soviet state. This period was known up to 1928 as the Second Period, mirroring the shift in the Soviet Union from war communism to the New Economic Policy.

In his 1915 article On the Slogan for a United States of Europe, Lenin explained that due to uneven development, the victory of socialism would occur first in one or several countries. However, historians like E.H. Carr have argued that by "victory of socialism", Lenin only meant the seizure of power by socialists, and not the construction of socialism in the sense of the first phase of communism. Besides, Lenin explicitly said many times that the construction of socialism was not possible in one country alone.

« ...we have always emphasized that we view things from an international perspective and that it is impossible to accomplish such a task as a socialist revolution in a single country... » Lenin, 1920

Grigory Zinoviev and Leon Trotsky vigorously criticized the theory of socialism in one country. In particular, Trotskyists often claimed and still claim that socialism in one country opposes both the basic tenets of Marxism and Lenin's particular beliefs that the final success of socialism in one country depends upon the revolution's degree of success in proletarian revolutions in the more advanced countries of Western Europe. Notably, they cited Lenin's words at the March 1918 Seventh Congress where Lenin had argued that the success of the Soviet revolution inextricably depended on the success of socialist revolutions in other countries. However, in this address, Lenin had emphasized being realistic and pragmatic rather, cautioning against wishful thinking that would place too much faith in the immediate success of a world revolution. It is suggested by Richard Fleming that Lenin's views on the matter evolved in light of the failures of the Hungarian and German revolutions.

Friedrich Engels, when answering the question, "Will it be possible for this revolution to take place in one country alone?" strongly argued in the negative, basing his argument upon the economic and historic importance of the world market, claiming that it had "already brought all the peoples of the Earth, [...] into such close relation with one another that none is independent of what happens to the others".

The defeat of all the 1917–1923 revolutions in Europe, except Russia, affected the Bolsheviks' and especially Lenin's hopes for an imminent world revolution. Lenin expressed this, stating he was not expecting a pre-defined date for other nations to achieve the same revolution in his 1918 Letter to American Workers.

With the proletarian revolutions in other countries having been either crushed or altogether failed to materialize, the nascent Soviet Union found itself encircled by capitalist or pre-capitalist states. According to the interpretation of Lenin's writings by the exponents of socialism in one country, Lenin laid down a long-term future course of action for the nascent Soviet state and its vanguard the R.C.P.(B.), prioritizing strengthening the nascent Soviet state internally so as to ensure its survival. The plan was based on, firstly, building a close class alliance between the proletariat and the vast masses of the small peasantry (with assured proletarian leadership of the peasantry), and secondly, constructing a complete socialist society in Russia whilst patiently awaiting and aiding the worldwide class struggle to mature into a world revolution in order to hasten the final victory of socialism.

In his pamphlet, The Impending Catastrophe and How to Combat It, Lenin argued that Russia had to overtake advanced countries in economic output as well as political advancement.

In his speech delivered at the Plenum of the C.P.S.U.(B.), Stalin observed that the aforementioned was written by Lenin as early as in September 1917, on the eve of October Revolution, during the imperialist war.

Opponents of this interpretation, notably Leon Trotsky, have contended that the Lenin quotes adduced in support of socialism on one country are taken out of context. They argue that in the 1915 article On the Slogan for a United States of Europe the expression "triumph of socialism [...] possible in [...] a single capitalist country" in context refers only to the initial establishment of a proletarian political and economic regime and not to the eventual construction of a complete socialist society which would take generations. As for the quote from the 1923 article On Cooperation, Trotsky maintains that the passage speaking of "necessary and sufficient" prerequisites for the transition to socialism is concerned only with the "socio-organisational" and political prerequisites, but not with the "material-productive" and cultural ones which Russia still lacked.

Historian Isaac Deutscher in his biographical account of Stalin noted that Marxist theoreticians in the 1920s took a condescending view of Stalin's formulations and doctrine of "socialism in one country". Deutscher recounted a party meeting in which David Riazanov, Soviet historian and founder of Marx-Engels Institute derided Stalin with the words "Stop it Koba, don't make a fool of yourself. Everybody knows that theory is not exactly your field".

According to political scientist Baruch Knei-Paz, Trotsky's theory of "permanent revolution" was grossly misrepresented by Stalin as defeatist and adventurist in antithesis to his proposed "socialism in one country" policy to secure victory during the succession struggle. Knei-Paz argued that Trotsky encouraged revolutions in Europe but was not at any time proposing "reckless confrontations" with the capitalist world.

== Joseph Stalin ==
Stalin presented the theory of socialism in one country as a further development of Leninism based on Lenin's aforementioned quotations. In his 14 February 1938 article titled Response to Comrade Ivanov, formulated as an answer to a question of a "comrade Ivanov" mailed to Pravda newspaper, Stalin splits the question in two parts. The first side of the question is in terms of the internal relations within the Soviet Union, whether it is possible to construct the socialist society by defeating the local bourgeoisie and fostering the union of workers and peasants.

Stalin quotes Lenin that "we have all that is necessary for the building of a complete socialist society" and claims that the socialist society has for the most part been indeed constructed. The second side of the question is in terms of external relations and whether the victory of the socialism is "final", i.e. whether capitalism cannot possibly be restored. Here, Stalin cites Lenin that the final victory is possible only on the international scale and only with the help of the workers of other countries.

Marxist historian Isaac Deutscher traces Stalin's socialism in one country policy to the publication of The Foundations of Leninism which emphasized the policy of isolationism and economic development in opposition to Trotsky's policy of permanent revolution.

In a 1936 interview with journalist Roy W. Howard, Stalin articulated his rejection of exporting the revolution and stated that "We never had such plans and intentions" and that "The export of revolution is nonsense".

== See also ==
- Leon Trotsky and the Politics of Economic Isolation
- Marxism–Leninism
- Stalinism
