= Chen Qichang =

Chinese communist politician (1900–1942)

- 陳其昌
- Born: 1900; Luoyang, Chinese Empire
- Died: 1942 (aged 41–42); Shanghai, Republic of China
- Education: Peking University
- Occupation: Politician
- Political party: Chinese Communist Party (1925–1929; expelled); Chinese Communist Left Opposition

Chen Qichang (Chinese: 陳其昌; Wade–Giles: Ch'en Ch'i-ch'ang; 1900–1942) was a Chinese communist politician. He was an early member of Chinese Communist Party and was active in the labor movement. He broke with the party to join with Chen Duxiu in his new Trotskyist group and became a prominent figure among Chinese Trotskyists. He was killed by Japanese gendarmerie while struggling against Japanese occupiers in Shanghai during Second Sino-Japanese War.

He had a number of pseudonyms and pen names, including Chen Qingchen (陈清晨), Chen Zhongshan (陈仲山), and Jiang Weiliang (江维亮).

== Biography ==
=== Early life and CCP ===
Chen was born in 1900 in Luoyang and came from a poor family. He was admitted to and studied at Peking University in the 1920s. He studied education but switched to economics. While at school, he joined Chinese Communist Party (CCP) in 1925 and served at various lower-level local party committees in Beijing. After Chiang Kai-Shek carried out Shanghai massacre to initiate white terror in China, he fled to Shandong, and then to Shanghai to participate in the labor movement there. He organized textile and tram workers in Shanghai French Concession.

One of his schoolmate at Peking University was the Wang Shiwei, who would become a celebrated communist writer. Later he financially assisted Wang's wife when she had a miscarriage in 1930. It was also said that Chen introduced Wang into the CCP.

Wang later left the party but then rejoined in 1937 when he arrived in Yan'an to join Mao Zedong's Chinese Red Army. However, he was arrested by the CCP police for penning an article titled Wild Lilly which was critical of the party bureaucracy. Kang Sheng accused him of being a Trotskyist and spy (and it was possible his early association with Chen Qichang, in Kang's claims, substantiated the charge, even though Wang never was a Trotskyist). Wang was later executed by Kang's orders.

=== Trotskyism ===
Chen read Leon Trotsky's opinions about China in 1929. Agreeing with Trotsky's views, he joined former CCP leader Chen Duxiu in turning to Trotskyism and was subsequently expelled by CCP. Among those who joined the Trotskyist cause included Zheng Chaolin and Chen's schoolmate Wang Fanxi (not to be confused with Wang Shiwei). Wang Fanxi later highly praised Chen for his high moral standards and personal courage.

Along with these associates, Chen became a part of Chinese Communist Left Opposition. During an internal conflict among Chinese Trotskyists in 1935, Chen supported Chen Duxiu and opposed Liu Renjing, who announced that Chen Qichang was expelled from the group. However, later Liu and a few others were arrested by Kuomintang police, and Liu as a result defected to the government. Liu's proclamations then became moot. The same year, C. Frank Glass, Yin Kuan, Wang Fanxi and Chen Qichang met to rebuild the Trotskyist organization.

=== Writing to Lu Xun ===
In 1936, Chen wrote to prominent author Lu Xun in an attempt to win him over to Trotskyism. However, Lu was very ill and Feng Xuefeng replied to Chen with a vituperous and later well-known reply on Lu's behalf. The reply contained insinuation that Trotskyists were collaborators with the Japanese Army. This was consistent with Joseph Stalin's false accusations that Trotskyists were secretly working with Nazi Germany and imperialist Japan.

=== Resistance against Japan and death ===
During the Second Sino-Japanese War (part of World War II) the Japanese army occupied Shanghai. He participated in underground resistance there. In 1942 he was arrested by Japanese forces and executed.

== Family ==
Chen's wife, Chen Shang Yanfang was born same year as he in 1900 and died in 1991. She has four sons and a daughter. One of the sons, Chen Daotong, reconciled with CCP but after establishment of People's Republic of China he was arrested in 1952 during Mao Zedong's anti-Trotskyist purge (to win favor from USSR during Stalin's rule at the time). He was released in 1956. He remained in contact with Zheng Chaolin, one of his fellow Trotskyists who was released much later in 1979. Chen Daotong died in 2014 from lung cancer.
