= Trotskyism =

Variety of Marxism developed by Leon Trotsky

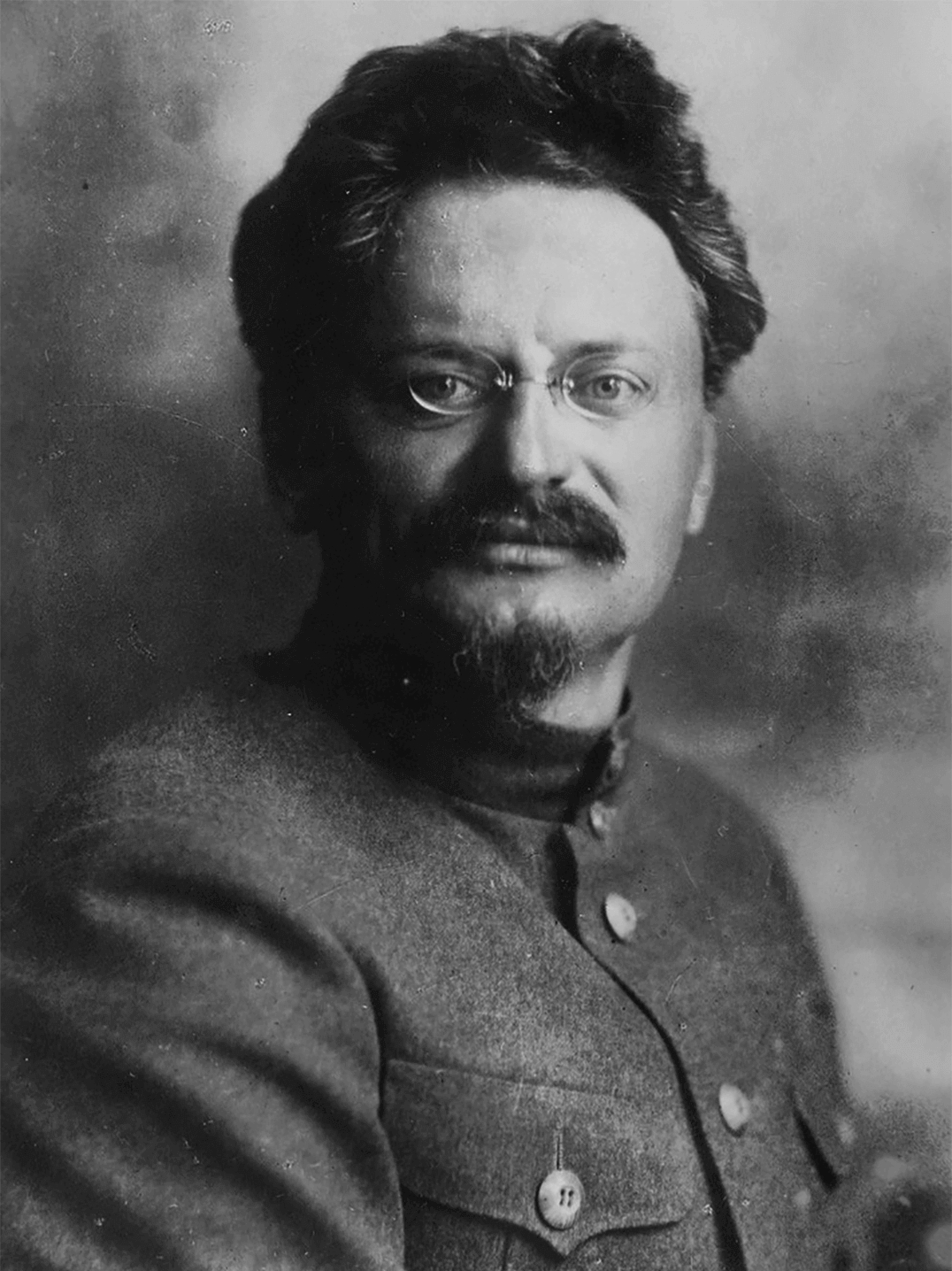
Leon Trotsky, after whom Trotskyism is named

Trotskyism (Russian: Троцкизм, romanized: Trotskizm) is the political ideology and branch of Marxism and Leninism developed by Russian revolutionary and intellectual Leon Trotsky along with some other members of the Left Opposition and the Fourth International. Trotsky described himself as an orthodox Marxist, a revolutionary Marxist, and a Bolshevik–Leninist as well as a follower of Karl Marx, Friedrich Engels, Vladimir Lenin, Karl Liebknecht, and Rosa Luxemburg. His relationship with Lenin has been a source of intense historical debate. However, on balance, scholarly opinion among a range of prominent historians and political scientists such as E. H. Carr, Isaac Deutscher, Moshe Lewin, Ronald Suny, Richard B. Day and W. Bruce Lincoln was that Lenin's desired "heir" would have been a collective responsibility in which Trotsky was placed in "an important role and within which Stalin would be dramatically demoted (if not removed)".

Trotsky advocated for a decentralized form of economic planning (while simultaneously proposing to "coordinate the entire economy through a central economic plan"), workers' control of production, the elected representation of multiple Soviet socialist parties, mass soviet democratization, the tactic of a united front against far-right parties, cultural autonomy for artistic movements, voluntary collectivisation, a transitional program, and socialist internationalism. He supported founding a vanguard party of the proletariat, and a dictatorship of the proletariat (as opposed to the "dictatorship of the bourgeoisie", which Marxists argue is a major component of capitalism) based on working-class self-emancipation and council democracy. Trotsky also adhered to scientific socialism and viewed this as a conscious expression of historical processes. Trotskyists are critical of Stalinism as they oppose Stalin's theory of socialism in one country in favour of Trotsky's theory of permanent revolution. Trotskyists criticize the bureaucracy and anti-democratic current developed in the Soviet Union under Stalin.

Despite their ideological disputes, Trotsky and Lenin were close personally prior to the London Congress of Social Democrats in 1903 and during the First World War. During the Russian Revolution and its aftermath, Lenin and Trotsky remained close personally, and became close ideologically. Trotskyists and some others call Trotsky its "co-leader". This was also alluded to by Rosa Luxemburg. Lenin himself never mentioned the concept of "Trotskyism" after Trotsky became a member of the Bolshevik party. Trotsky was the Red Army's paramount leader in the Revolutionary period's direct aftermath. Trotsky initially opposed some aspects of Leninism, but eventually concluded that unity between the Mensheviks and Bolsheviks was impossible and joined the Bolsheviks. Trotsky played a leading role with Lenin in the October Revolution. Lenin and Trotsky were also both honorary presidents of the Third International. Trotskyists have traditionally drawn upon Lenin's testament and his alliance with Trotsky in 1922–23 against the Soviet bureaucracy as primary evidence that Lenin sought to remove Stalin from the position of General Secretary. Various historians have also cited Lenin's proposal to appoint Trotsky Vice-Chairman of the Soviet Union as further evidence that he intended Trotsky to be his successor as head of government.

In October 1927, by order of Stalin, Trotsky was removed from power. In November of the same year, he was expelled from the All-Union Communist Party (Bolsheviks) (VKP(b)). He was exiled to Alma-Ata (now Almaty) in January 1928 and then expelled from the USSR in February 1929. As the head of the Fourth International, Trotsky continued in exile to oppose what he termed the degenerated workers' state in the USSR. On 20 August 1940, Trotsky was attacked in Mexico City by Ramón Mercader, a Spanish-born NKVD agent, and died the next day in a hospital. His murder is considered a political assassination. Almost all Trotskyists within the VKP(b) had been executed in the Great Purges of 1937–1938, effectively removing all of Trotsky's internal influence in the USSR. Nikita Khrushchev had come to power as head of the Communist Party in Ukraine, signing lists of Trotskyists to be executed. Trotsky and the party of Trotskyists were still recognized as enemies of the USSR during Khrushchev's rule of the USSR after 1956. Trotsky's Fourth International was established in the French Third Republic in 1938 when Trotskyists argued that the Comintern or Third International had become irretrievably "lost to Stalinism" and thus incapable of leading the international working class to political power.

== Definition ==
According to Trotsky, his programme could be distinguished from other Marxist theories by five key elements:

- Support for the strategy of permanent revolution in opposition to the two-stage theory of his opponents.
- Criticism of the post-1924 leadership of the Union of Soviet Socialist Republics and analysis of its features, after 1933, also support for political revolution in the USSR and what Trotskyists term the degenerated workers' states.
- Support for social revolution in the advanced capitalist countries through working-class mass action.
- Support for proletarian internationalism.
- Use of a transitional programme of demands that bridge between daily struggles of the working class and the maximal ideas of the socialist transformation of society.

On the political spectrum of Marxism, Trotskyists are usually considered to be on the left. In the 1920s, they called themselves the Left Opposition, although today's left communism is distinct and usually non-Bolshevik. The terminological disagreement can be confusing because different versions of a left-right political spectrum are used. Anti-revisionists consider themselves the ultimate leftists on a spectrum from communism on the left to imperialist capitalism on the right. However, given that Stalinism is often labelled rightist within the communist spectrum and left communism leftist, anti-revisionists' idea of the left is very different from that of left communism. Despite being Bolshevik-Leninist comrades during the Russian Revolution and Russian Civil War, Trotsky and Stalin became enemies in the 1920s and, after that, opposed the legitimacy of each other's forms of Leninism. Trotsky was highly critical of the Stalinist USSR for suppressing democracy and the lack of adequate economic planning.

Overall, Trotsky and the Left-United Opposition factions advocated for rapid industrialization, voluntary collectivisation of agriculture, and the expansion of a worker's democracy.

== Theory ==
Until 1905, some revolutionaries claimed that Marx's theory of history posited that only a revolution in a European capitalist society would lead to a socialist one. According to this position, a socialist revolution could not occur in a backward, feudal country such as early 20th-century Russia when it had such a small and almost powerless capitalist class. In 1905, Trotsky formulated his theory of permanent revolution, which later became a defining characteristic of Trotskyism.

The theory of permanent revolution addressed how such feudal regimes were to be overthrown and how socialism could establish itself, given the lack of economic prerequisites. Trotsky argued that only the working class could overthrow feudalism and win the peasantry's support in Russia. Furthermore, he argued that the Russian working class would not stop there. They would win their revolution against the weak capitalist class, establish a workers' state in Russia, and appeal to the working class in the advanced capitalist countries worldwide. As a result, the global working class would come to Russia's aid, and socialism could develop worldwide.

According to political scientist Baruch Knei-Paz, Trotsky's theory of "permanent revolution" was grossly misrepresented by Stalin as defeatist and adventurist during the succession struggle, when in fact Trotsky encouraged revolutions in Europe but was not at any time proposing "reckless confrontations" with the capitalist world.

=== Capitalist or bourgeois-democratic revolution ===
Revolutions in Britain in the 17th century and in France in 1789 abolished feudalism and established the essential requisites for the development of capitalism. Trotsky argued that these revolutions would not be repeated in Russia.

In Results and Prospects, written in 1906, Trotsky outlines his theory in detail, arguing: "History does not repeat itself. However much one may compare the Russian Revolution with the Great French Revolution, the former can never be transformed into a repetition of the latter". In the French Revolution of 1789, France experienced what Marxists called a "bourgeois-democratic revolution"—a regime was established wherein the bourgeoisie overthrew the existing French feudalistic system. The bourgeoisie then moved towards establishing a regime of democratic parliamentary institutions. However, while democratic rights were extended to the bourgeoisie, they were not generally extended to a universal franchise. The freedom for workers to organize unions or to strike was not achieved without considerable struggle.

=== Passivity of the bourgeoisie ===
Trotsky argues that countries like Russia had no "enlightened, active" revolutionary bourgeoisie which could play the same role, and the working class constituted a tiny minority. In his book, Results and Prospects, Trotsky states that, by the time of the European revolutions of 1848, "the bourgeoisie was already unable to play a comparable role. It did not want and was not able to undertake the revolutionary liquidation of the social system that stood in its path to power."

The theory of permanent revolution considers that in many countries that are thought, by Trotskyists, to not have completed a bourgeois-democratic revolution, the capitalist class opposes the creation of any revolutionary situation, as a revolutionary proletariat may threaten their position in society. Trotsky believed that, "[the bourgeoisie] fear of the armed proletariat is greater than the fear of the soldiery of the autocracy." In the case of Russia, the working class, although a small minority in a predominantly peasant-based society, was organised in vast factories, owned by the capitalist class, and into large working-class districts. Proletariat organisation meant that, during the Russian Revolution of 1905, the bourgeoisie found it necessary to ally with reactionary elements, such as the essentially feudal landlords and, ultimately, the existing Czarist Russian state forces. This was to protect capitalist class ownership of property, such as factories, banks, etc.—from expropriation by the revolutionary proletariat.

Therefore, according to the theory of permanent revolution, the capitalist classes of economically backward countries are incapable of carrying through revolutionary change. As a result, they are linked to and rely on the feudal landowners in many ways. Thus, Trotsky argues that because a majority of the branches of industry in Russia originated under the direct influence of government measures—sometimes with the help of government subsidies—the capitalist class was again tied to the ruling elite. The capitalist class was subservient to European capital.

=== The incapability of the peasantry ===
The theory of permanent revolution further considers that the peasantry as a whole cannot take on the task of carrying through the revolution because it is dispersed in small holdings throughout the country and forms a heterogeneous grouping, including the rich peasants who employ rural workers and aspire to landlordism as well as the poor peasants who aspire to own more land. Trotsky argues: "All historical experience [...] shows that the peasantry are absolutely incapable of taking up an independent political role".

=== The key role of the proletariat ===
Trotskyists differ on the extent to which this is true today. However, even the most orthodox tend to recognise in the late twentieth century a new development in the revolts of the rural poor: the self-organising struggles of the landless, along with many other struggles that in some ways reflect the militant united, organised struggles of the working class, which to various degrees do not bear the marks of class divisions typical of the heroic peasant struggles of previous epochs. However, orthodox Trotskyists today still argue that the town- and city-based working-class struggle is central to the task of a successful socialist revolution linked to these struggles of the rural poor. They argue that the working class learns of the necessity to conduct a collective struggle, for instance, in trade unions, arising from its social conditions in the factories and workplaces; and that the collective consciousness it achieves is an essential ingredient of the socialist reconstruction of society.

Trotsky himself argued that only the proletariat or working class was capable of achieving the tasks of that bourgeois revolution. In 1905, the working class in Russia, a generation brought together in vast factories from the relative isolation of peasant life, saw the result of its labour as a vast collective effort, also seeing the only means of struggling against its oppression in terms of a collective effort, forming workers councils (soviets) in the course of the revolution of that year. In 1906, Trotsky argued:

The factory system brings the proletariat to the foreground [...] The proletariat immediately found itself concentrated in tremendous masses, while between these masses and the autocracy there stood a capitalist bourgeoisie, very small in numbers, isolated from the "people", half-foreign, without historical traditions, and inspired only by the greed for gain.

— Leon Trotsky, Results and Prospects

For instance, the Putilov Factory numbered 12,000 workers in 1900 and, according to Trotsky, 36,000 in July 1917.

Although only a tiny minority in Russian society, the proletariat would lead a revolution to emancipate the peasantry and thus "secure the support of the peasantry" as part of that revolution, on whose support it would rely. (Note: Trotsky adds that the revolution must raise the cultural and political consciousness of the peasantry.) However, to improve their conditions, the working class must create a revolution of their own, which would accomplish the bourgeois revolution and establish a workers' state.

=== International revolution ===
Only fully developed capitalist conditions prepare the basis for socialism. According to classical Marxism, a revolution in peasant-based countries such as Russia ultimately prepares the ground for capitalism's development since the liberated peasants become small owners, producers, and traders. This leads to the growth of commodity markets, from which a new capitalist class emerges.

Trotsky agreed that a new socialist state and economy in a country like Russia would not be able to hold out against the pressures of a hostile capitalist world and the internal pressures of its backward economy. Trotsky argued that the revolution must quickly spread to capitalist countries, bringing about a socialist revolution that must spread worldwide. In this way, the revolution is "permanent", moving out of necessity first, from the bourgeois revolution to the workers' revolution and from there, uninterruptedly, to European and worldwide revolutions.

An internationalist outlook of permanent revolution is found in the works of Karl Marx. The term "permanent revolution" is taken from a remark of Marx in his March 1850 Address: "it is our task", Marx said:

[...] to make the revolution permanent until all the more or less propertied classes have been driven from their ruling positions, until the proletariat has conquered state power and until the association of the proletarians has progressed sufficiently far—not only in one country but in all the leading countries of the world—that competition between the proletarians of these countries ceases and at least the decisive forces of production are concentrated in the hands of the workers.

— Karl Marx, Address of the Central Committee to the Communist League

Trotsky's biographer, Isaac Deutscher, has explicitly contrasted his support for proletarian internationalism against his opposition to revolution by military conquest as seen with his documented opposition to the war with Poland in 1920, proposed armistice with the Entente and temperance with staging anti-British revolts in the Middle East. Historian Robert Vincent Daniels believed that the practical differences, in the domain of international policy, between the Left Opposition and other factions had been exaggerated and he contended that Trotsky was no more prepared than other Bolshevik figures to risk war or for the loss of trade opportunities despite his support for world revolution.

=== Socialist democracy and Workers' Control ===
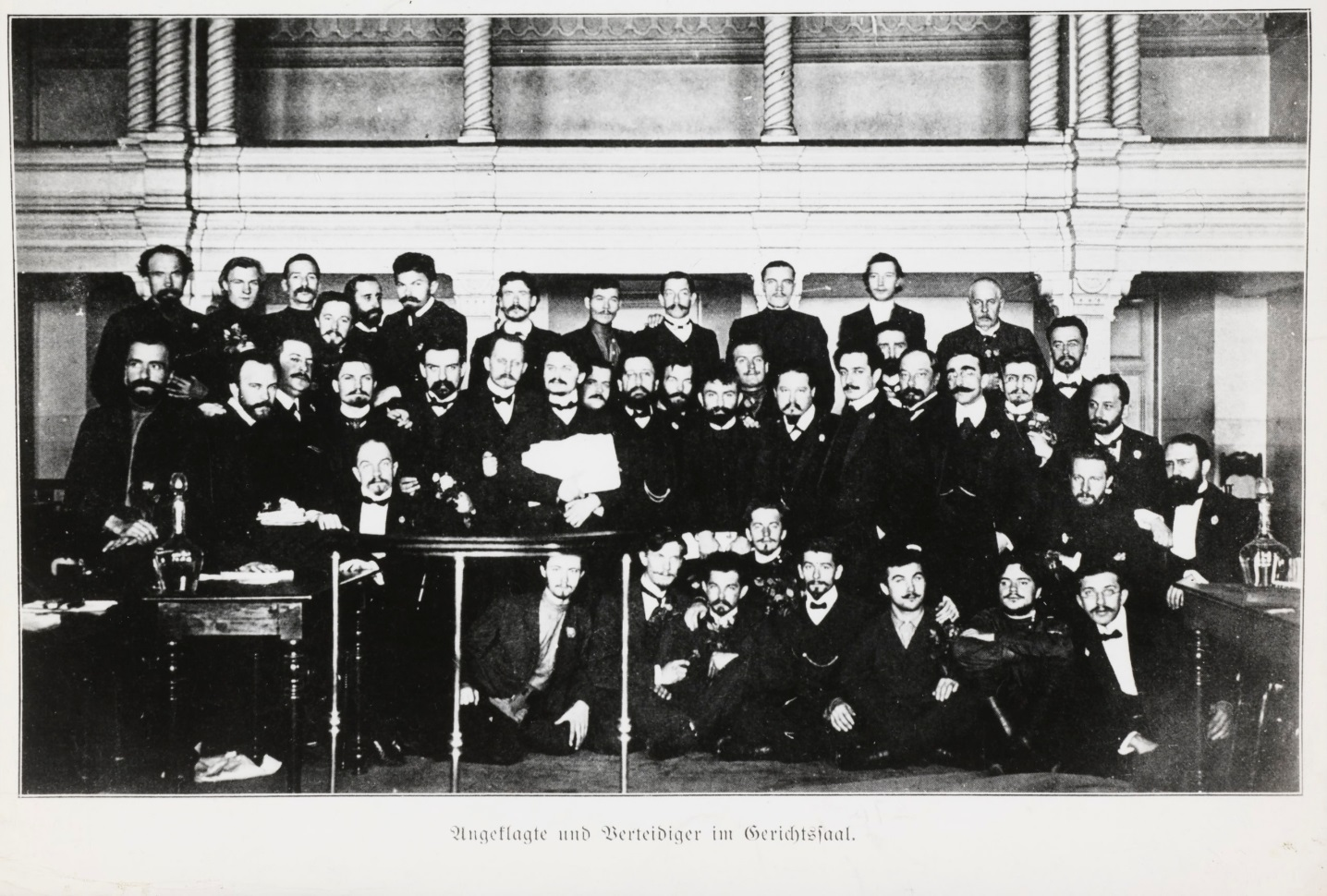
The Soviet of Workers' Deputies of St. Petersburg in 1905, Trotsky in the center. The soviets were an early example of a workers council.

Prior to the October Revolution, Trotsky had been part of a tendency toward radical democracy which included both Left Mensheviks and Left Bolsheviks. His work, Our Political Tasks, published in 1904 reviewed issues related to party organisation, mass participation and the potential dangers of substitutionism which he foresaw in a Leninist party model. Trotsky would also assume a central role in the 1905 revolution and serve as the Chairman of the Petersburg Soviet of Workers' Delegates in which he wrote several proclamations urging for improved economic conditions, political rights and the use of strike action against the Tsarist regime on behalf of workers.

In 1917, he had proposed the election of a new Soviet presidium with other socialist parties based on proportional representation. On the other hand, he had accepted the ban on rival parties in Moscow during the Russian Civil War due to their opposition to the October Revolution. Yet, he also opposed the extension of the ban to the Mensheviks in Soviet Georgia.

In 1922, Lenin allied with Leon Trotsky against the party's growing bureaucratisation and the influence of Joseph Stalin. In 1923, Trotsky and a number of Old Bolsheviks who signed The Declaration of 46 raised concerns to the Politburo concerning intra-party democracy which shared similarities with Lenin's proposed party reforms before his death. The signatories of the 46 letter expressed grievances related to the provincial conferences, party congresses, and the election of committees. Separately, Trotsky would develop his views further with the publication of the New Course in 1924.

In 1927, Trotsky and the United Opposition had argued for the expansion of industrial democracy with their joint platform which demanded majority representation of workers in trade union congresses including the All-Union Congress and an increase of non-party workers to one-third of representation in these elected organs. They also supported legal protection for workers' right to criticise, such as the right to make independent proposals. According to historian Vadim Rogovin, these proposals would have developed democracy in the sphere of production and facilitated the establishment of workers' control over economic management.

Following Stalin's consolidation of power in the Soviet Union and static centralization of political power, Trotsky condemned the Soviet government's policies for lacking widespread democratic participation on the part of the population and for suppressing workers' self-management and democratic participation in the management of the economy. Because these authoritarian political measures were inconsistent with the organizational precepts of socialism, Trotsky characterized the Soviet Union as a deformed workers' state that could not effectively transition to socialism. Ostensibly socialist states where democracy is lacking, yet the economy is largely in the hands of the state, are termed by orthodox Trotskyist theories as degenerated or deformed workers' states and not socialist states.

Bureaucratic autocracy must give place to Soviet democracy. A restoration of the right of criticism, and a genuine freedom of elections, are necessary conditions for the further development of the country. This assumes a revival of freedom of Soviet parties, beginning with the party of Bolsheviks, and a resurrection of the trade unions. The bringing of democracy into industry means a radical revision of plans in the interests of toilers.

— Trotsky, The Revolution Betrayed, 1936

In 1931, Trotsky wrote a pamphlet on the Spanish Revolution and called for the creation of worker's juntas in emulation of elected soviets as an expression of working class organisation. Trotsky stipulated the need for shared participation of the communist factions, anarcho-syndicalists and socialists.

In 1936, Trotsky argued in his work, The Revolution Betrayed, for the restoration of the right of criticism in areas such as economic matters, the revitalization of trade unions and free elections of the Soviet parties. Trotsky also argued that the excessive authoritarianism under Stalin had undermined the implementation of the First five-year plan. He noted that several engineers and economists who had created the plan were themselves later put on trial as "conscious wreckers who had acted on the instructions of a foreign power".

Polish historian and biographer, Isaac Deutscher, viewed his inner-party reforms in 1923–24 as arguably the first act in the restoration of free Soviet institutions which the party had sought to establish in 1917 and the return of worker's democracy which would correspond with a gradual dismantlement of the single-party system. At the same time, Deutscher noted that Trotsky's attitude towards democracy could be characterised as inconsistent and hesitant by opponents, but this stemmed from a range of reasons, such as the ill timing after the failed revolutions in the West and controversies around party schisms.

In the Transitional Program, which was drafted in 1938 during the founding congress of the Fourth International, Trotsky reiterated the need for the legalization of the Soviet parties and worker's control of production.

=== Uneven and combined development ===
The concept of uneven and combined development was derived from the political theories of Trotsky. This concept was developed in combination with the related theory of permanent revolution to explain the historical context of Russia. He would later elaborate on this theory to explain the specific laws of uneven development in 1930 and the conditions for a possible revolutionary scenario. According to biographer Ian Thatcher, this theory would be later generalised to "the entire history of mankind".

Political scientists Emanuele Saccarelli and Latha Varadarajan valued his theory as a "signal contribution" to the discipline of international relations. They argued his theory presented "a specific understanding of capitalist development as "uneven", insofar as it systematically featured geographically divergent "advanced" and "backward" regions" across the world economy.

=== Socialist culture ===
Faith merely promises to move mountains; but technology, which takes nothing ‘on faith’, is actually able to cut down mountains and move them. Up to now this was done for industrial purposes (mines) or for railways (tunnels); in the future this will be done on an immeasurably larger scale, according to a general industrial and artistic plan. Man will occupy himself with re-registering mountains and rivers, and will earnestly and repeatedly make improvements in nature.

— Trotsky, Literature and Revolution, 1924

In Literature and Revolution, Trotsky examined aesthetic issues concerning class and the Russian Revolution. Soviet scholar Robert Bird considered his work the "first systematic treatment of art by a Communist leader" and a catalyst for later Marxist cultural and critical theories. He had also defended intellectual autonomy in relation to the Russian literary movements and scientific theories such as Freudian psychoanalytic theory along with Einstein’s theory of relativity during the succession period. However, these theories were increasingly marginalised during the Stalin era.

In Problems of Everyday Life, a contemporaneous book which further articulated his views on culture and science, Trotsky argued that cultural development would accentuate industrial and technical progress. He viewed both elements to be interrelated components as part of dialectical interaction in which he viewed the low level of Russian technique and expertise to be a function of cultural backwardness. According to Trotsky, Western industrial methods and products such as the radio should not be rejected due to their status as products of a capitalist system, but rather absorbed into the Soviet socialist framework to facilitate new forms of techniques and cultural production. In this interpretation, the transference of techniques brought new cultural changes in terms of rationalism, efficiency, exactitude, and quality.

Trotsky would later co-author the 1938 Manifesto for an Independent Revolutionary Art with the endorsement of prominent artists Andre Breton and Diego Rivera. Trotsky's writings on literature such as his 1923 survey which advocated tolerance, limited censorship and respect for literary tradition had strong appeal to the New York Intellectuals.

Trotsky critiqued contemporary literary movements such as Futurism and emphasised the need for cultural autonomy to develop a socialist culture. According to literary critic Terry Eagleton, Trotsky recognised "like Lenin on the need for a socialist culture to absorb the finest products of bourgeois art". Trotsky himself viewed the proletarian culture as "temporary and transitional" which would provide the foundations for a culture above classes. He also argued that the preconditions for artistic creativity were economic well-being and emancipation from material constraints.

Political scientist, Baruch Knei-Paz, characterised his view on the role of the party as transmitters of culture to the masses and raising the standards of education, as well as entry into the cultural sphere, but that the process of artistic creation in terms of language and presentation should be the domain of the practitioner. Knei-Paz also noted key distinctions between Trotsky's approach to cultural matters and Stalin's policy in the 1930s.

=== Economics ===
Trotsky was an early proponent of economic planning since 1923 and favored an accelerated pace of industrialization. In 1921, he had also been a prominent supporter of Gosplan as a newly established body and called for the strengthening of its formal responsibilities to support a balanced level of economic reconstruction after the Civil War. Lenin and Politburo members had also proposed he served as deputy chairman with a focus on economic matters related to the either STO, Gosplan or the Council of National Economy.

Trotsky had urged economic decentralisation between the state, oblast regions, and factories to counter structural inefficiency and the problem of bureaucracy. He had proposed the principles underlying the N.E.P. in 1920 to the Politburo to mitigate urgent economic matters arising from war communism. He would later reproach Lenin privately about the delayed government response in 1921–1922. However, his position also differed from the majority of Soviet leaders at the time who fully supported the New Economic policy.

Comparatively, Trotsky believed that planning and N.E.P. should develop within a mixed framework until the socialist sector gradually superseded the private industry. He found allies among a circle of economic theorists and administrators, which included Evgenii Preobazhensky along Georgy Pyatakov, deputy chairman of the Council of the National Economy and had more broadly the support of many party intellectuals.

Trotsky had specified the need for the "overall guidance in planning i.e. the systematic co-ordination of the fundamental sectors of the state economy in the process of adapting to the present market" and urged for a national plan alongside currency stabilization. He also rejected the Stalinist conception of industrialisation, which favoured heavy industry. Instead, he proposed the use of foreign trade as an accelerator and to direct investments by means of a system of comparative coefficients.

The problem of agriculture is a much more complicated one, and there is nothing surprising in this to the Marxian mind. The change from the system of small individual peasant holdings to socialist methods of land cultivation is only conceivable after a number of consecutive stages of progress in technical science in economics and culture.

— Trotsky on the need for a gradual and scientific socialization of agriculture in “Towards Socialism or Capitalism?”, 1926.

Trotsky and the Left Opposition developed a number of economic proposals in response to the scissor crisis, which had undermined relations between the workers and peasants in 1923–1924. This included a progressive tax on the wealthier sections of populations, such as the kulaks and NEPmen, alongside an equilibrium of the import-export balance to access accumulated reserves to purchase machinery from abroad to increase the pace of industrialization. The policy was later adopted by members of the United Opposition, which also advocated a programme of rapid industrialization during the debates of 1924 and 1927. The United Opposition proposed a progressive tax on wealthier peasants, the encouragement of agricultural cooperatives, and the formation of collective farms voluntarily.

Trotsky, as president of the electrification commission, along with members of the Opposition bloc, had also put forward an electrification plan which involved the construction of the hydroelectric Dnieprostroi dam. According to historian Sheila Fitzpatrick, the scholarly consensus was that Stalin appropriated the position of the Left Opposition on such matters as industrialisation and collectivisation. In exile, Trotsky maintained that the disproportions and imbalances which became characteristic of Stalinist planning in the 1930s such as the underdeveloped consumer base along with the priority focus on heavy industry were due to a number of avoidable problems. He argued that the industrial drive had been enacted under more severe circumstances, several years later, and in a less rational manner than originally conceived by the Left Opposition.

Ernest Mandel argued that the economic programme of Trotsky differed from the forced policy of collectivisation implemented by Stalin after 1928 due to the levels of brutality associated with its enforcement. Notably, Trotsky sought to raise taxation on wealthier farmers and encourage farm labourers, along with poor peasants to form collective farms voluntarily in conjunction with the allocation of state resources to agricultural machinery, fertilizers, credit and agronomic assistance.

In 1932–33, Trotsky insisted upon the need for mass participation in the operationalisation of the planned economy:

"Insoluble without the daily experience of millions, without their critical review of their own collective experience, without their expression of their needs and demands and could not be carried out within the confines of the official sanctums.... even if the Politburo consisted of seven universal geniuses, of seven Marxes, or seven Lenins, it will still be unable, all on its own, with all its creative imagination, to assert command over the economy of 170 million people".

British cybernetician Stafford Beer, who worked on a decentralized form of economic planning, Project Cybersyn from 1970 to 1973, was reported to have read and been influenced by Trotsky's critique of the Soviet bureaucracy.

The economic platform of a planned economy combined with an authentic worker's democracy as originally advocated by Trotsky has constituted the programme of the Fourth International and the modern Trotskyist movement.

=== Transitional program ===
Trotsky drafted the transitional programme as a programmatic document for the founding congress of the Fourth International in 1938.

He explicitly emphasised the core need for the programme:

"It is explicitly necessary to help the masses in the process of the daily struggle to find the bridge between present demands and the socialist program of the revolution. This bridge should include a system of transitional demands, stemming from today's conditions and from today's consciousness of wide layers of the working class and unalterably leading to one final conclusion: the conquest of power by the proletariat".

The transitional programme features three types of proposals for action. This includes democratic demands such as the right of unions and self-determination; immediate demands which are concerned with everyday struggles such as wage increases and transitional demands which are directed at the capitalist system such as worker's control of production .

=== Scientific socialism ===
We must give a scientific explanation of society, and clearly explain it to the masses. That is the difference between Marxism and reformism.

— Trotsky on the transitional program of the Fourth International.

In his collection of texts, In Defence of Marxism, Leon Trotsky defended the dialectical method of scientific socialism during the factional schisms within the American Trotskyist movement during 1939–40. Trotsky viewed dialectics as an essential method of analysis to discern the class nature of the Soviet Union. Specifically, he described scientific socialism as the "conscious expression of the unconscious historical process". According to Daniels, Trotsky conceived historical revolutions as a long, interrelated process of political and social struggle which undergo various stages with national and international dimensions.

Prior to his expulsion from the Soviet Union, Trotsky had encouraged empirical studies with the use of Marxist methods for social and historical development. He also insisted on the need for a freedom of science, including theoretical research, in 1925, for socially useful purposes. Trotsky defended Einstein’s theory of relativity in Soviet intellectual circles, but this became an anathema during the Stalin era and was only rehabilitated following the latter's death.

In line with the scientific outlook of Marxist philosophy, Trotsky heavily emphasized science to alleviate the level of backwardness among the Soviet masses. Concurrently, he viewed socialism as a progressive struggle for science, culture, and morality in which science should be given the maximum scope for development. In 1918, he had supported Taylorism along with Lenin as a means of scientifically managing industries with the support of foreign engineers. Multiple historians have stressed the technocratic nature of his governance proposals compared to Stalin and Bukharin with a higher reliance on "bourgeois" experts and specialists.

Trotskyists have emphasised the dialectical relationship between objective, material conditions, and subjective factors such as party, leadership, in understanding the nature of change in historical events.

=== United front and theory of fascism ===
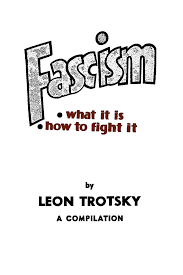
Leon Trotsky's original pamphlet "Fascism: What it is and how to fight it" argued for the tactical method of a united front to counter the rise of Nazi Germany

At a time when hundreds of thousands and millions of workers, especially in Germany, are departing from Communism, in part to fascism and in the main into the camp of indifferentism, thousands and tens of thousands of Social Democratic workers, under the impact of the self-same defeat, are evolving into the left, to the side of Communism. There cannot, however, even be talk of their accepting the hopelessly discredited Stalinist leadership.

— Trotsky's writings on the challenge of Stalinism and fascism in 1933.

Trotsky was a central figure in the Comintern during its first four congresses. During this time, he helped to generalize the strategy and tactics of the Bolsheviks to newly formed Communist parties across Europe and further afield. From 1921 onwards, the united front, a method of uniting revolutionaries and reformists in the common struggle while winning some of the workers to revolution, was the central tactic put forward by the Comintern after the defeat of the German revolution.

After he was exiled and politically marginalized by Stalinism, Trotsky continued to argue for a united front against fascism in Germany and Spain. According to Joseph Choonara of the British Socialist Workers Party in International Socialism, his articles on the united front represent an essential part of his political legacy.

Trotsky also formulated a theory of fascism based on a dialectical interpretation of events to analyze the manifestation of Italian fascism and the early emergence of Nazi Germany from 1930 to 1933.

Marxist theorist and economist Hillel Ticktin argued that his political strategy and approach to fascism such as the emphasis on an organisational bloc between the German Communist Party and Social-Democratic party during the interwar period would very likely have prevented Adolf Hitler from ascending to political power.

=== Political ethics and morality ===
A means can be justified only by its end. But the end in turn needs to be justified. From the Marxist point of view, which expresses the historical interests of the proletariat, the end is justified if it leads to increasing the power of man over nature and to the abolition of the power of man over man.

— Trotsky's writings on "The Dialectical Interpedence of Ends and Means".

In 1938, Trotsky had written Their Morals and Ours which consisted of ethical polemics in response to criticisms around his actions concerning the Kronstadt rebellion and wider questions posed around the perceived "amoral" methods of the Bolsheviks. Critics believed these methods seemed to emulate the maxim that the "ends justifies the means". Trotsky argued that Marxism situated the foundation of morality as a product of society to serve social interests rather than "eternal moral truths" proclaimed by institutional religions. On the other hand, he regarded it as farcical to assert that an end could justify any criminal means and viewed this to be a distorted representation of the maxim. Instead, Trotsky believed that the means and ends frequently “exchanged places” as when democracy is sought by the working class as an instrument to actualize socialism. He also viewed revolution to be deducible from the laws of the development and primarily the class struggle, but this did not mean all means are permissible. Fundamentally, Trotsky argued that ends "rejects" means that are incompatible with itself. In other words, socialism cannot be furthered through fraud, deceit or the worship of leaders but through honesty and integrity as essential elements of revolutionary morality in dealing with the working masses.

== History ==
=== Origins ===
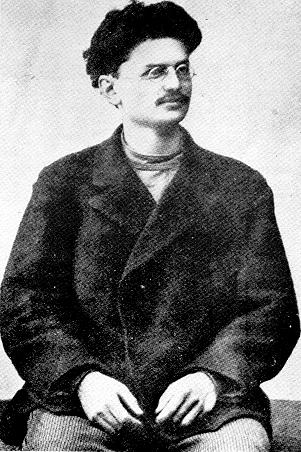
Trotsky in exile in Siberia, 1900

According to Trotsky, the term "Trotskyism" was coined by Pavel Milyukov (sometimes transliterated as Paul Miliukoff), the ideological leader of the Constitutional Democratic Party (Kadets) in Russia. Milyukov waged a bitter war against Trotskyism "as early as 1905".

Trotsky was elected chairman of the St. Petersburg Soviet during the Russian Revolution of 1905. He pursued a policy of proletarian revolution at a time when other socialist trends advocated a transition to a "bourgeois" (capitalist) regime to replace the essentially feudal Romanov state. This year, Trotsky developed the theory of permanent revolution, as it later became known (see below). In 1905, Trotsky quotes from a postscript to a book by Milyukov, The Elections to the Second State Duma, published no later than May 1907:

Those who reproach the Kadets with failure to protest at that time, by organising meetings, against the "revolutionary illusions" of Trotskyism and the relapse into Blanquism, simply do not understand [...] the mood of the democratic public at meetings during that period.

— Pavel Milyukov, The Elections to the Second State Duma

Milyukov suggests that the mood of the "democratic public" was in support of Trotsky's policy of the overthrow of the Romanov regime alongside a workers' revolution to overthrow the capitalist owners of industry, support for strike action and the establishment of democratically elected workers' councils or "soviets". This differed from variations of Council Communism in Germany due to the Russian Peasantry and the role they have in overall Leninism including Trotskyism compared to the role they have in Council Communism

=== Trotskyism and the 1917 Russian Revolution ===
During his leadership of the Russian revolution of 1905, Trotsky argued that once it became clear that the Tsar's army would not come out in support of the workers, it was necessary to retreat before the armed might of the state in as good an order as possible. In 1917, Trotsky was again elected chairman of the Petrograd soviet, but this time soon came to lead the Military Revolutionary Committee, which had the allegiance of the Petrograd garrison and carried through the October 1917 insurrection. Stalin wrote:

All practical work in connection with the organisation of the uprising was done under the immediate direction of Comrade Trotsky, the President of the Petrograd Soviet. It can be stated with certainty that the Party is indebted primarily and principally to Comrade Trotsky for the rapid going over of the garrison to the side of the Soviet and the efficient manner in which the work of the Military Revolutionary Committee was organized. The principal assistants of Comrade Trotsky were Comrades Antonov and Podvoisky.

— Joseph Stalin, Pravda, November 6, 1918

As a result of his role in the Russian Revolution of 1917, the theory of permanent revolution was embraced by the young Soviet state until 1924.

The Russian revolution of 1917 was marked by two revolutions: the relatively spontaneous February 1917 revolution and the 25 October 1917 seizure of power by the Bolsheviks, who had gained the leadership of the Petrograd soviet.

Before the February 1917 Russian revolution, Lenin had formulated a slogan calling for the "democratic dictatorship of the proletariat and the peasantry", but after the February revolution, through his April Theses, Lenin instead called for "all power to the Soviets". Nevertheless, Lenin continued to emphasise (as did Trotsky) the classical Marxist position that the peasantry formed a basis for the development of capitalism, not socialism.

Also, before February 1917, Trotsky had not accepted the importance of a Bolshevik-style organisation. Once the February 1917 Russian revolution had broken out, Trotsky admitted the importance of a Bolshevik organisation and joined the Bolsheviks in July 1917. Although many, like Stalin, saw Trotsky's role in the October 1917 Russian revolution as central, Trotsky wrote that without Lenin and the Bolshevik Party, the October revolution of 1917 would not have taken place.

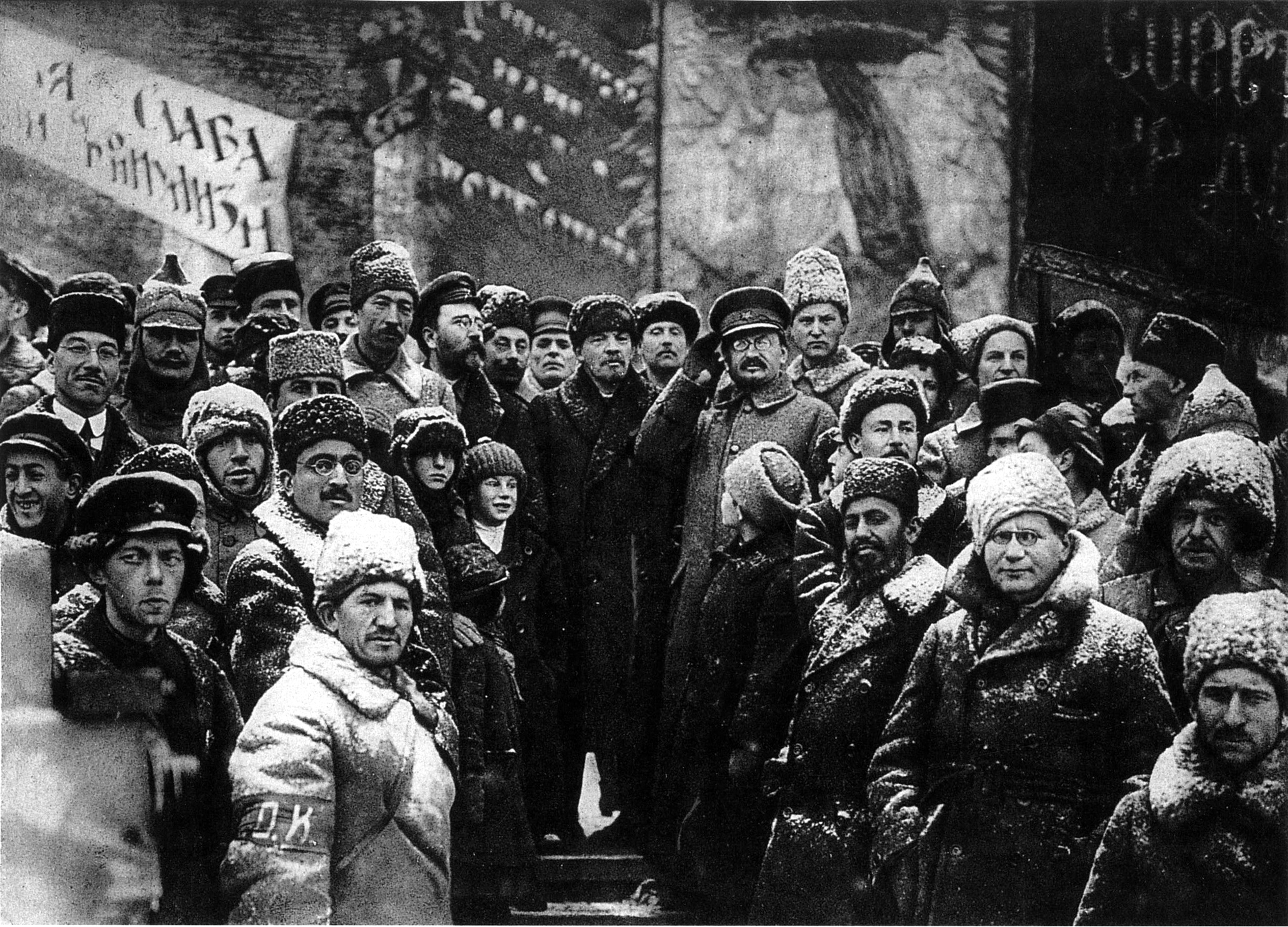
Lenin, Trotsky and Kamenev celebrating the second anniversary of the October Revolution

Other Bolshevik figures such as Anatoly Lunacharsky, Moisei Uritsky and Dmitry Manuilsky agreed that Lenin's influence on the Bolshevik party was decisive but the October insurrection was carried out according to Trotsky's, not to Lenin's plan.

As a result, since 1917, Trotskyism as a political theory has been fully committed to a Leninist style of democratic centralist party organisation, which Trotskyists argue must not be confused with the party organisation as it later developed under Stalin. Trotsky had previously suggested that Lenin's method of organisation would lead to a dictatorship. However, it is essential to emphasise that after 1917, orthodox Trotskyists argue that the loss of democracy in the USSR was caused by the failure of the revolution to spread internationally and the consequent wars, isolation, and imperialist intervention, not the Bolshevik style of organisation.

After the majority of the petrograd Soviet passed into the hands of the Bolsheviks, [Trotsky] was elected its chairman and in that position organized and led the insurrection of October 25.

— Lenin on the organization of the October Revolution, Vol.XIV of the Collected Works.

Lenin's outlook had always been that the Russian revolution would need to stimulate a Socialist revolution in Western Europe so that this European socialist society would come to the aid of the Russian revolution and enable Russia to advance towards socialism. Lenin stated:

We have stressed in a good many written works, in all our public utterances, and in all our statements in the press that [...] the socialist revolution can triumph only on two conditions. First, if it is given timely support by a socialist revolution in one or several advanced countries.

— Vladimir Lenin, Speech at Tenth Congress of the RCP(B)

This outlook matched Trotsky's theory of permanent revolution precisely. Trotsky's permanent revolution had foreseen that the working class would not stop at the bourgeois democratic stage of the revolution but proceed towards a workers' state, as happened in 1917. The Polish Trotskyist Isaac Deutscher maintains that in 1917, Lenin changed his attitude toward Trotsky's theory of Permanent Revolution, and after the October revolution, it was adopted by the Bolsheviks.

Lenin was met with initial disbelief in April 1917. Trotsky argues that:

[...] up to the outbreak of the February revolution and for a time after Trotskyism did not mean the idea that it was impossible to build a socialist society within the national boundaries of Russia (which "possibility" was never expressed by anybody up to 1924 and hardly came into anybody's head). Trotskyism meant the idea that the Russian proletariat might win the power in advance of the Western proletariat, and that in that case it could not confine itself within the limits of a democratic dictatorship but would be compelled to undertake the initial socialist measures. It is not surprising, then, that the April theses of Lenin were condemned as Trotskyist.

— Leon Trotsky, History of the Russian Revolution

=== "Legend of Trotskyism" ===
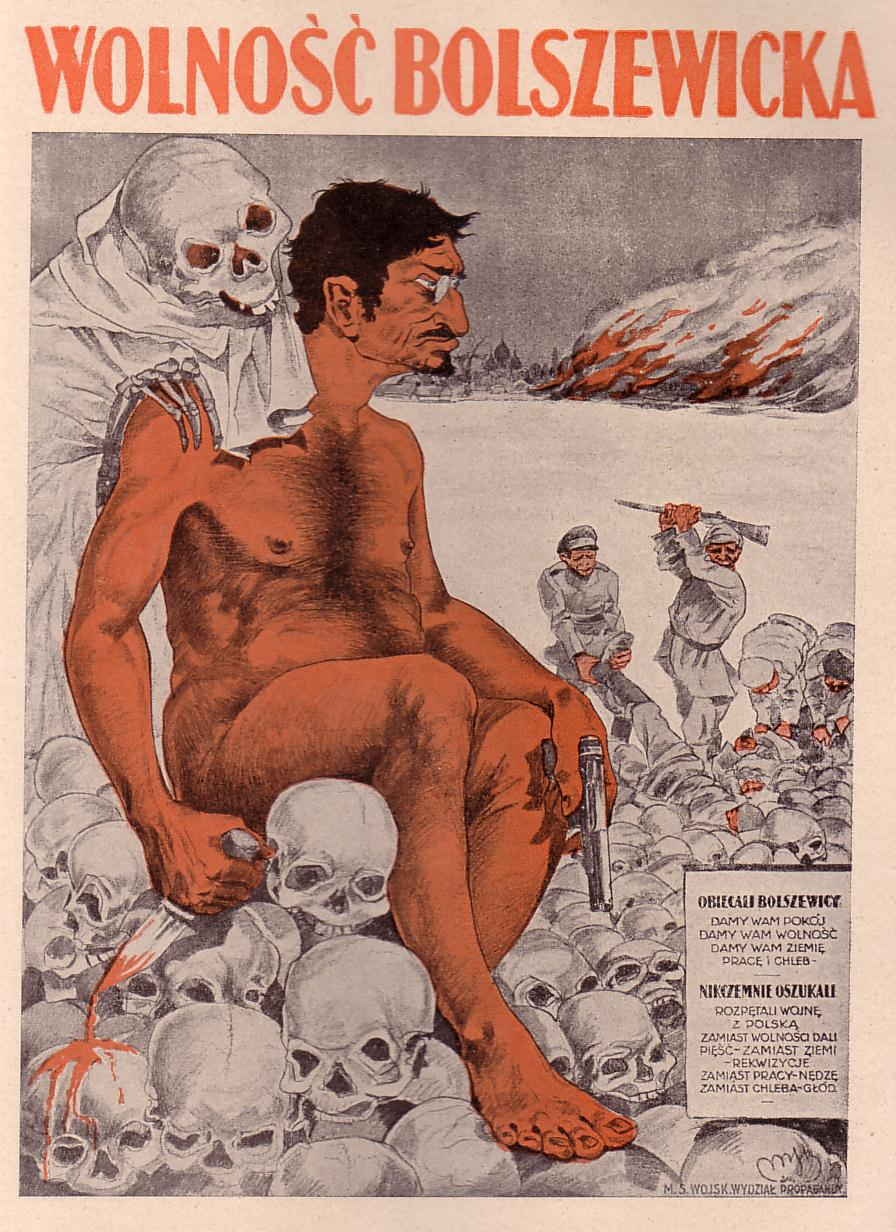
"Bolshevik freedom" with nude of Trotsky in a Polish propaganda poster, Polish–Soviet War (1920)

In The Stalin School of Falsification, Trotsky argues that what he calls the "legend of Trotskyism" was formulated by Grigory Zinoviev and Lev Kamenev in collaboration with Stalin in 1924 in response to the criticisms Trotsky raised of Politburo policy. Orlando Figes argues: "The urge to silence Trotsky, and all criticism of the Politburo, was in itself a crucial factor in Stalin's rise to power".

During 1922–1924, Lenin suffered a series of strokes and became increasingly incapacitated. In a document dictated before his death in 1924 while describing Trotsky as "distinguished not only by his exceptional abilities—personally he is, to be sure, the most able man in the present Central Committee" and also maintaining that "his non-Bolshevik past should not be held against him", Lenin criticized him for "showing excessive preoccupation with the purely administrative side of the work" and also requested that Stalin be removed from his position of General Secretary, but his notes remained suppressed until 1956. Zinoviev and Kamenev broke with Stalin in 1925 and joined Trotsky in 1926 in what was known as the United Opposition.

In 1926, Stalin allied with Nikolai Bukharin, who led the campaign against "Trotskyism". In The Stalin School of Falsification, Trotsky quotes Bukharin's 1918 pamphlet, From the Collapse of Czarism to the Fall of the Bourgeoisie, which was re-printed in 1923 by the party publishing house, Proletari. Bukharin explains and embraces Trotsky's theory of permanent revolution in this pamphlet: "The Russian proletariat is confronted more sharply than ever before with the problem of the international revolution ... The grand total of relationships which have arisen in Europe leads to this inevitable conclusion. Thus, the permanent revolution in Russia is passing into the European proletarian revolution". Yet it is common knowledge, Trotsky argues, that three years later in 1926 "Bukharin was the chief and indeed the sole theoretician of the entire campaign against 'Trotskyism', summed up in the struggle against the theory of the permanent revolution."

Trotsky wrote that the Left Opposition grew in influence throughout the 1920s, attempting to reform the Communist Party, but in 1927 Stalin declared "civil war" against them:

During the first ten years of its struggle, the Left Opposition did not abandon the program of ideological conquest of the party for that of conquest of power against the party. Its slogan was: reform, not revolution. The bureaucracy, however, even in those times, was ready for any revolution in order to defend itself against a democratic reform.

In 1927, when the struggle reached an especially bitter stage, Stalin declared at a session of the Central Committee, addressing himself to the Opposition: "Those cadres can be removed only by civil war!" What was a threat in Stalin's words became, thanks to a series of defeats of the European proletariat, a historic fact. The road of reform was turned into a road of revolution.

— Leon Trotsky,

Internationally, Trotsky's opposition and criticism of the ruling troika received support from several, Central Committee members of foreign communist parties. This included Christian Rakovsky, Chairman of the Ukraine Sovnarkom, Boris Souvarine of the French Communist Party and the Central Committee of the Polish Communist Party which was led by prominent theoreticians such as Maksymilian Horwitz, Maria Koszutska and Adolf Warski.

The defeat of the European working class led to further isolation in Russia and further suppression of the Opposition. Trotsky argued that the "so-called struggle against 'Trotskyism' grew out of the bureaucratic reaction against the October Revolution [of 1917]". He responded to the one-sided civil war with his Letter to the Bureau of Party History (1927), contrasting what he claimed to be the falsification of history with the official history of just a few years before. He further accused Stalin of derailing the Chinese Communist Revolution and causing the massacre of the Chinese workers:

In the year 1918, Stalin, at the very outset of his campaign against me, found it necessary, as we have already learned, to write the following words:

"All the work of practical organization of the insurrection was carried out under the direct leadership of the Chairman of the Petrograd Soviet, comrade Trotsky..." (Stalin, Pravda, 6 November 1918)

With full responsibility for my words, I am now compelled to say that the cruel massacre of the Chinese proletariat and the Chinese Revolution at its three most important turning points, the strengthening of the position of the trade union agents of British imperialism after the General Strike of 1926, and, finally, the general weakening of the position of the Communist International and the Soviet Union, the party owes principally and above all to Stalin.

— Leon Trotsky,

Trotsky was sent into internal exile, and his supporters were jailed. For instance, Victor Serge first "spent six weeks in a cell" after a visit at midnight, then 85 days in an inner GPU cell, most of it in solitary confinement. He details the jailings of the Left Opposition. However, the Left Opposition worked secretly within the USSR. Trotsky was eventually exiled to Turkey and moved to France, Norway and finally Mexico.

After 1928, the various Communist Parties worldwide expelled Trotskyists from their ranks. Most Trotskyists defend the economic achievements of the planned economy in the USSR during the 1920s and 1930s, despite the "misleadership" of the Soviet bureaucracy and what they claim to be the loss of democracy. Trotskyists claim that in 1928 inner party democracy and soviet democracy, which was at the foundation of Bolshevism, had been destroyed within the various Communist Parties. Anyone who disagreed with the party line was labelled a Trotskyist and even a fascist.

The official characterization had gone further by 1947. The entry on Trotskyism in the first edition of the Great Soviet Encyclopedia (published 1926–1947) defined it as "an anti-Leninist, opportunist current and the most dangerous agent of imperialist bourgeoisie in the workers' movement, the basest variety of Menshevism," which during its struggle against the Communist Party had ceased to be a political current within the working class and turned into "the vanguard detachment of the counter-revolutionary bourgeoisie." The entry traced this hostility back to 1903, presenting Trotsky's entire career as an unbroken campaign against Lenin.

Max Shachtman would later define the early form of Trotskyism between 1928 and 1932 as being solely focused on opposing socialism in one country, the Anglo-Russian Committee, and the application of Stalinist and Bukharinist policies in regards to the Chinese Civil War. These things were became secondary to supporting the idea of permanent revolution.

=== Founding of the Fourth International ===
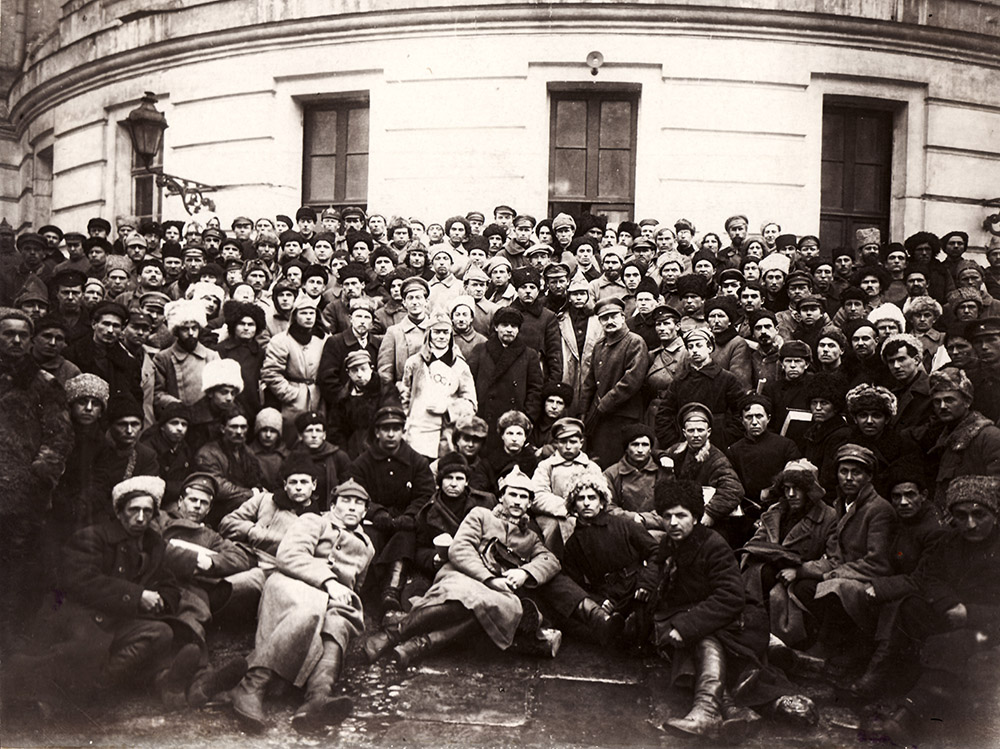
Trotsky with Vladimir Lenin and soldiers in Petrograd

Trotsky founded the International Left Opposition in 1930. It was meant to be an opposition group within the Comintern, but anyone who joined or was suspected of joining the ILO was immediately expelled from the Comintern. The ILO, therefore, concluded that opposing Stalinism from within the communist organizations controlled by Stalin's supporters had become impossible, so new organizations had to be formed. In 1933, the ILO was renamed the International Communist League (ICL), which formed the basis of the Fourth International, founded in Paris in 1938.

Trotsky said that only the Fourth International, based on Lenin's theory of the vanguard party, could lead the world revolution and that it would need to be built in opposition to the capitalists and the Stalinists.

Trotsky argued that the defeat of the German working class and the coming to power of Adolf Hitler in 1933 was due in part to the mistakes of the Third Period policy of the Communist International and that the subsequent failure of the Communist Parties to draw the correct lessons from those defeats showed that they were no longer capable of reform and a new international organisation of the working class must be organised. The transitional demand tactic had to be a key element.

At the time of the founding of the Fourth International in 1938, Trotskyism was a mass political current in Vietnam, Sri Lanka and slightly later Bolivia. There was also a substantial Trotskyist movement in China which included the founding father of the Chinese communist movement, Chen Duxiu, amongst its number. Wherever Stalinists gained power, they prioritised hunting down Trotskyists and treated them as the worst enemies.

The Fourth International suffered repression and disruption through the Second World War. Isolated from each other and faced with political developments quite unlike those anticipated by Trotsky, some Trotskyist organizations decided that the USSR could no longer be called a degenerated workers' state and withdrew from the Fourth International. After 1945, Trotskyism was smashed as a mass movement in Vietnam and marginalised in many other countries.

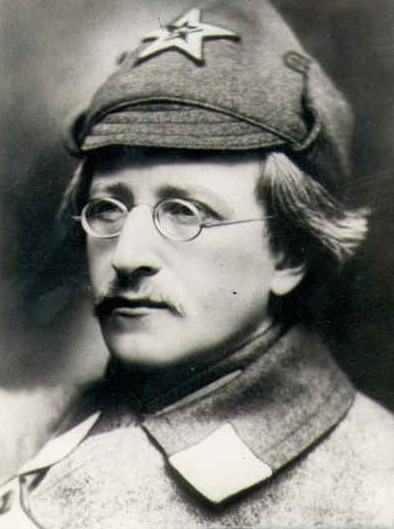
Antonov-Ovseenko was the first former Trotskyist to be posthumously rehabilitated

The International Secretariat of the Fourth International (ISFI) organised an international conference in 1946 and then World Congresses in 1948 and 1951 to assess the expropriation of the capitalists in Eastern Europe and Yugoslavia, the threat of a Third World War and the tasks of revolutionaries. The Eastern European Communist-led governments, which came into being after World War II without a social revolution, were described by a resolution of the 1948 congress as presiding over capitalist economies. By 1951, the Congress had concluded that they had become "deformed workers' states". As the Cold War intensified, the ISFI's 1951 World Congress adopted theses by Michel Pablo that anticipated an international civil war. Pablo's followers considered that the Communist Parties, under pressure from the real workers' movement, could escape Stalin's manipulations and follow a revolutionary orientation.

The 1951 Congress argued that Trotskyists should start to conduct systematic work inside those Communist Parties, followed by the majority of the working class. However, the ISFI's view that the Soviet leadership was counterrevolutionary remained unchanged. The 1951 Congress argued that the USSR took over these countries because of the military and political results of World War II and instituted nationalized property relations only after its attempts at placating capitalism failed to protect those countries from the threat of incursion by the West.

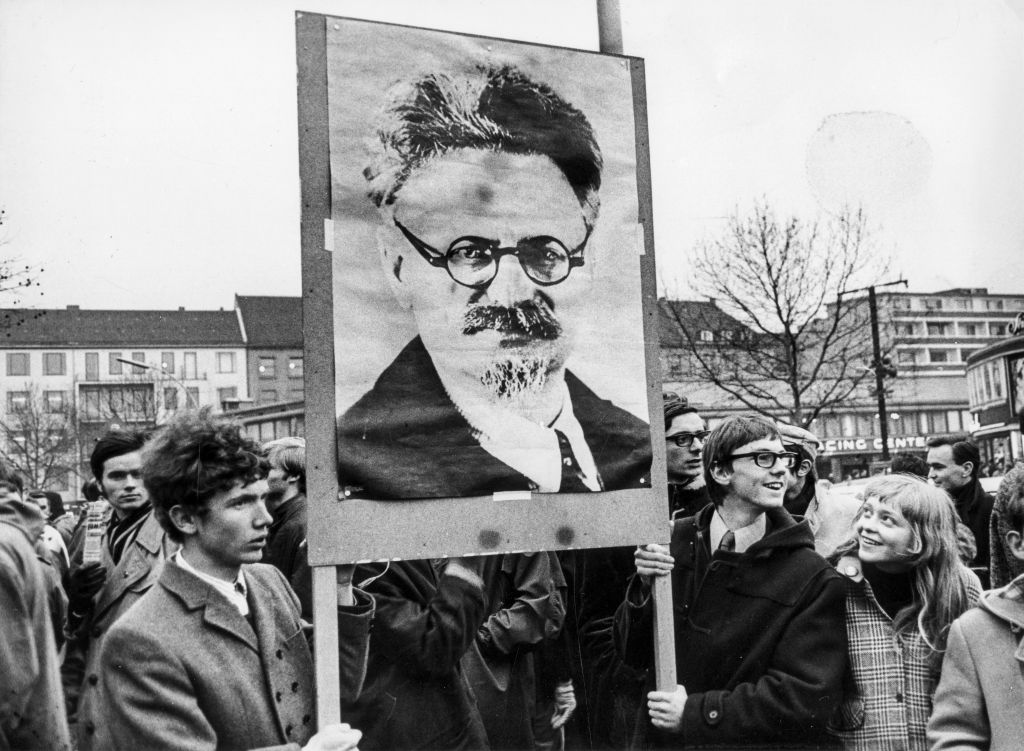
The West German student movement in 1968

Pablo began expelling many people who disagreed with his thesis and did not want to dissolve their organizations within the Communist Parties. For instance, he expelled most of the French section and replaced its leadership. As a result, the opposition to Pablo eventually rose to the surface, with the Open Letter to Trotskyists of the World, by Socialist Workers Party leader James P. Cannon.

The Fourth International split in 1953 into two public factions. Several sections of the International established the International Committee of the Fourth International (ICFI) as an alternative centre to the International Secretariat, in which they felt a revisionist faction led by Michel Pablo had taken power and recommitted themselves to the Lenin-Trotsky Theory of the Party and Trotsky's theory of Permanent Revolution. From 1960, led by the U.S Socialist Workers Party, many ICFI sections began the reunification process with the IS, but factions split off and continued their commitment to the ICFI.

=== Cuban Revolution ===
Historian Theodore Draper had been a Trotskyist in his youth, but eventually became a more independently minded historian, still skeptical of Stalinism. Draper originally gained scholarly recognition for his writings on the history of the Communist Party USA.

After the Cuban Revolution, a variety of socialist writers like C. Wright Mills, Paul Sweezy, Herbert Matthews, and Paul Johnson were delivering polemics in defense of the new Fidelista government. In 1961 Encounter magazine asked Theodore Draper to write an assessment of the Cuban Revolution and the new provisional government. Draper published Castro's Cuba - A Revolution Betrayed in which, Draper presents a Marxist analysis which claims that "Castroism" is a rudimentary nationalism which ignores the principles of Marxism, and that Fidel Castro is a demagogue. Draper also describes his Betrayal thesis by alluding to Trotsky's allegation that Stalin "betrayed" the Russian Revolution. Draper alleges that Castro had "betrayed" the Cuban Revolution in a similar manner.

Trotskyists in general, were split about Castroism. Trotskyists like J. Posadas celebrated Castroism, and claimed that Cuba is on the road to socialism, while the British and French sections of the International Committee of the Fourth International, claimed that the Cuban Revolution only developed a form of state capitalism in Cuba.

== Internationals ==
The Fourth International derives from the 1963 reunification of the two public factions into which the Fourth International split in 1953: the International Secretariat of the Fourth International (ISFI) and some sections of the International Committee of the Fourth International (ICFI). It is often referred to as the United Secretariat of the Fourth International, the name of its leading committee before 2003. The USFI retains sections and sympathizing organizations in over 50 countries, including France's Ligue Communiste Revolutionnaire (LCR) and sections in Portugal, Sri Lanka, the Philippines, and Pakistan.

The International Committee of the Fourth International maintains its independent organization and publishes the World Socialist Web Site. They have full sections in the US, UK, Canada, Germany, France, Sri Lanka, Turkey, and Australia with sympathizing groups in Russia, Ukraine, New Zealand, India, Pakistan, Brazil, Croatia, Ireland, and other countries.

The Committee for a Workers' International (CWI) was founded in 1974 and has sections in over 35 countries. Before 1997, most organisations affiliated with the CWI sought to build an entrist Marxist wing within the large social democratic parties. The CWI has adopted a range of tactics, including working with trade unions, but in some cases working within or supporting other parties, endorsing Bernie Sanders for the 2016 U.S. Democratic Party nomination and encouraging him to run independently.

In France, the LCR is rivalled by Lutte Ouvrière, the French section of the Internationalist Communist Union (UCI), with small sections in a handful of other countries. It focuses its activities, whether propaganda or intervention, on the industrial proletariat.

The Committee for a Marxist International (CMI) founders claims they were expelled from the CWI when the CWI abandoned entryism. The CWI claims they left, and no expulsions were carried out. In 2006, it became the International Marxist Tendency (IMT). CMI/IMT groups continue the policy of entering mainstream social democratic, communist or radical parties. Known as the Revolutionary Communist International (RCI) since 2024, it is headed by Alan Woods.

The list of Trotskyist internationals shows that there are a large number of other multinational tendencies that stand in the tradition of Leon Trotsky.

== Trotskyist movements ==
=== Latin America ===
Trotskyism has influenced some recent major social upheavals, particularly in Latin America. The Bolivian Trotskyist party (Partido Obrero Revolucionario, POR) became a mass party in the late 1940s and early 1950s and, together with other groups, played a central role during and immediately after the period termed the Bolivian National Revolution.

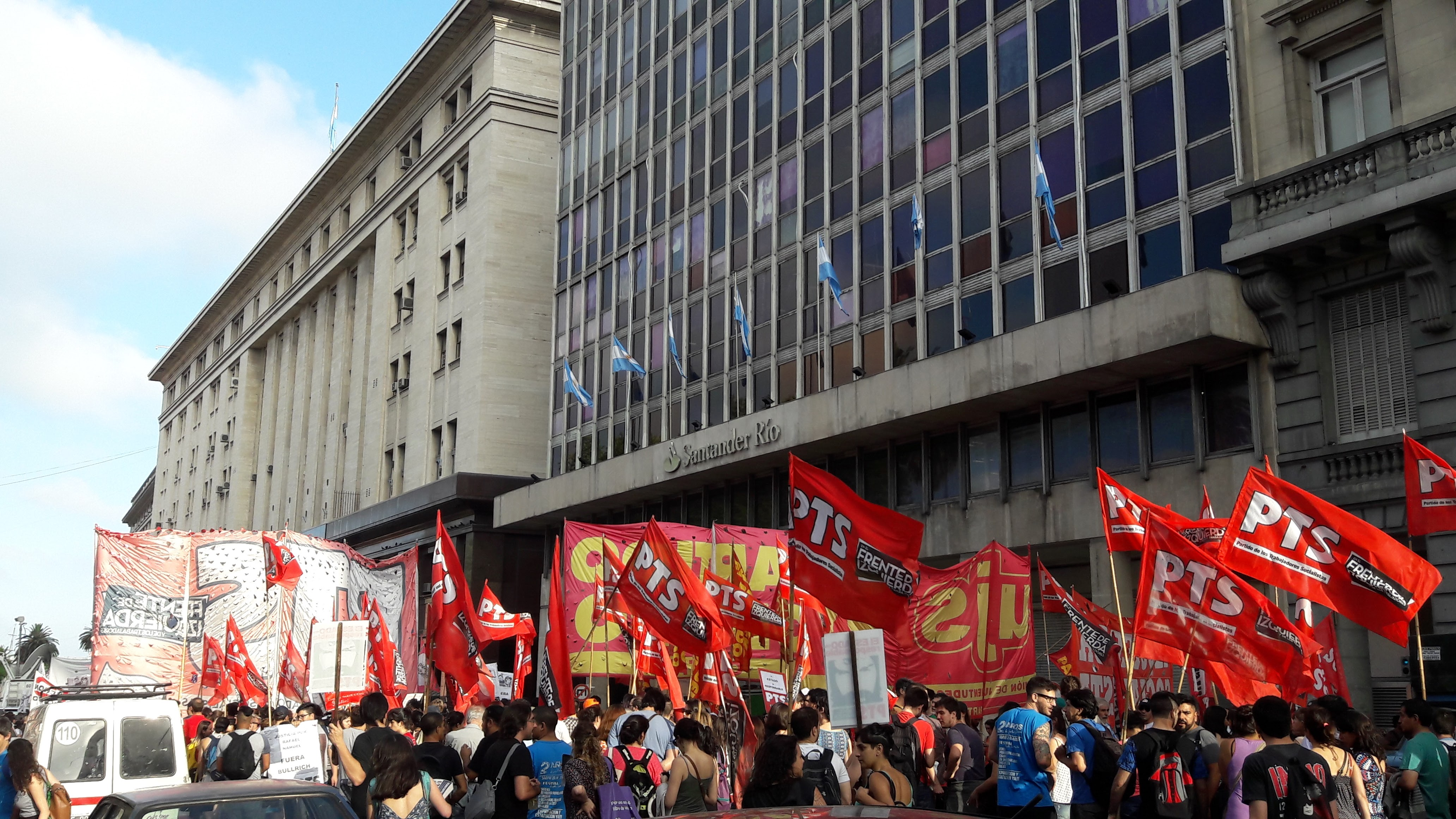
Workers' Left Front in Argentina in December 2017

In Argentina, the Workers' Revolutionary Party (Partido Revolucionario de los Trabajadores, PRT) lay in the merger of two leftist organizations in 1965, the Revolutionary and Popular Amerindian Front (Frente Revolucionario Indoamericano Popular, FRIP) and Worker's Word (Palabra Obrera, PO). In 1968, the PRT adhered to the Fourth International, based in Paris. That same year, a related organisation was founded in Argentina, the ERP (People's Revolutionary Army), which became South America's most powerful rural guerrilla movement during the 1970s. The PRT left the Fourth International in 1973. During the Dirty War, the Argentine military regime suppressed both the PRT and the ERP. ERP commander Roberto Santucho was killed in July 1976. Owing to the ruthless repression, PRT showed no signs of activity after 1977. During the 1980s in Argentina, the Trotskyist party founded in 1982 by Nahuel Moreno, MAS (Movimiento al Socialismo, Movement for Socialism), claimed to be the "largest Trotskyist party" in the world before it broke into many different fragments in the late 1980s, including the present-day Workers' Socialist Movement (MST), Socialist Workers' Party (PTS), Socialist Left (IS), Self-determination and Freedom (AyL, which is not outspoken Trotskyist). In 1989, an electoral front with the Communist Party and MRS called Izquierda Unida ("United Left") retrieved 3.49% of the vote, representing 580,944 voters. The Workers' Party (Partido Obrero) in Argentina later founded with other Trotskyist groups the Workers' Left Front which is represented in parliament.

Venezuelan president Hugo Chávez declared himself a Trotskyist during the swearing-in of his cabinet two days before his inauguration on 10 January 2007. Venezuelan Trotskyist organizations do not regard Chávez as a Trotskyist, with some describing him as a bourgeois nationalist. In contrast, others consider him an honest revolutionary leader who made significant mistakes due to his lack of a Marxist analysis.

=== North America ===
They fear, in a word, that Soviet America will become the counterpart of what they have been told Soviet Russia looks like. Actually American soviets will be as different from the Russian soviets as the United States of President Roosevelt differs from the Russian Empire of Czar Nicholas II. Yet communism can come in America only through revolution, just as independence and democracy came in America.

— Trotsky on If America Should Go Communist in 1934.

The development of the American Trotskyism movement emerged with the Communist League of America (CLA), then as the Workers Party of the United States (WPUS) and briefly as the Socialist Party (SP) of America before beginning in 1938 as the Socialist Workers Party (SWP). According to historian Paul Le Blanc, James Cannon and Max Shachtman were the most influential leaders of early US Trotskyism.

Trotsky engaged with members of the American Socialist Workers Party on reaching the Black population. He had correspondence with C.L.R. James on the question of self-determination and expressed support for Black Americans seeking equal rights and an autonomous state.

In 1953 there was a major split in the Fourth International between the International Secretariat of the Fourth International (ISFI) led by Michel Pablo and the International Committee of the Fourth International (ICFI) led iniatially by James Cannon of the SWP. While a decade later in 1963 the majority of the SWP reunited with Pablo's supporters, a minority group persisted in their independence and criticisms of what they deemed to be the ISFI's abandonment of Permanent Revolution and their promotion of Stalinst regimes and parties. This group that remained loyal to the ICFI would go on to become the Socialist Equality Party (US). There is also another North American national section of the ICFI in Canada, also known as the Socialist Equality Party.

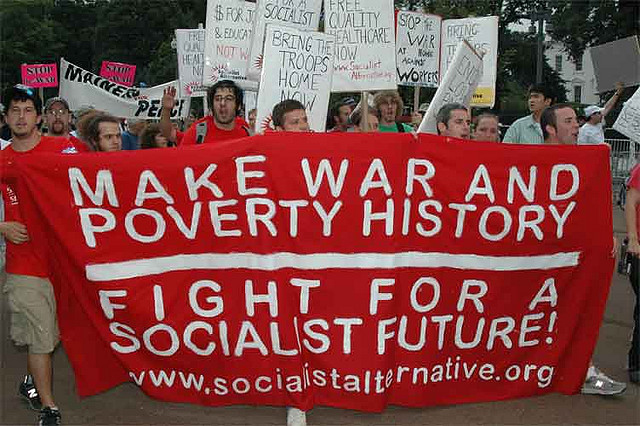
Socialist Alternative members in the United States at an antiwar march in 2007

There is a Trotskyist-influenced caucus within the Democratic Socialists of America, Reform and Revolution.

=== Africa ===
Through the 1930s, the first viable black trade unions in Transvaal, South Africa were established by Trotskyists.

The Democratic Socialist Movement (Nigeria) exists in Nigeria, it was founded in 1986 among a confederation of labour and student socialists. It is affiliated to the Committee for a Workers' International.

=== Asia ===
==== China ====
In China, various left opposition groups in the late 1920s sought to engage Trotsky against the Comintern policy of support for the Kuomintang. In 1931, at Trotsky's urging, the various factions united in the Communist League of China, adopting Trotsky's document "The Political Situation in China and the Task of the Bolshevik-Leninist Opposition". Prominent members include Chen Duxiu, Wang Fanxi and Chen Qichang. The League was persecuted by the Nationalist government and by the Chinese Communist Party.

In 1949, the Revolutionary Communist Party of China (Chinese: 中國革命共產黨; RCP) fled to Hong Kong. Since 1974, the party has been legally active as October Review, its official publication.

==== Vietnam ====
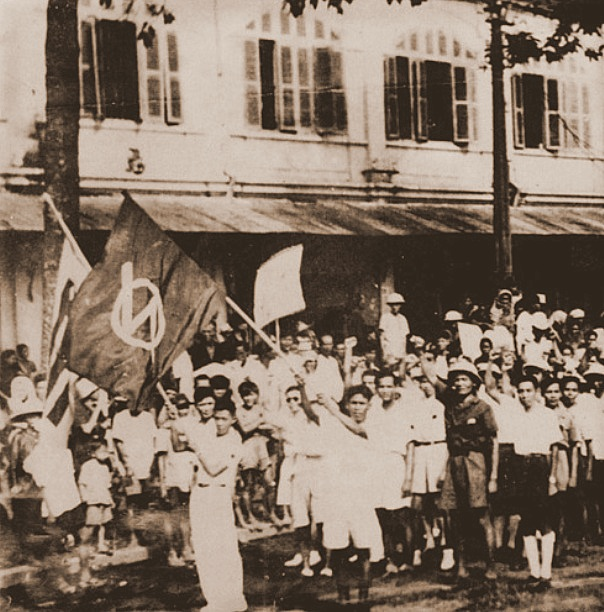
The Trotskyist League of Vietnam in Saigon, 21 August 1945.

In French Indochina during the 1930s, Trotskyism in Vietnam, led by Tạ Thu Thâu, was a significant current, particularly in Saigon, Cochinchina. In 1929, in the French Left Opposition La Vérité, Ta Thu Thau condemned the Comintern for leading Chinese Communists (in 1927) to "the graveyard" through its support for the Kuomintang. The "'Sun Yat-sen-ist' synthesis of democracy, nationalism and socialism" was "a kind of nationalist mysticism". In Indochina, it could only obscure "the concrete class relationships, and the real, organic liaison between the indigenous bourgeoisie and French imperialism," in the light of which the call for independence is "mechanical and formalistic". "A revolution based on the organisation of the proletarian and peasant masses is the only one capable of liberating the colonies ... The question of independence must be bound up with that of the proletarian socialist revolution."

For a period in the 1930s, Ta Thu Thau's Struggle group, centred around the newspaper La Lutte, was sufficiently strong to induce "Stalinists" (members of the Indochinese Communist Party) to collaborate with the Trotskyists in support of labour and peasant struggles, and in the presentation of a common Workers Slate for Saigon municipal, and Cochinchina Council, elections. Ta Thu Thau was captured and executed by the Stalinist-front Viet Minh in September 1945. Many, if not most, of his fellow luttuers were subsequently killed, caught between the Viet Minh and the French effort at colonial reconquest.

==== Sri Lanka ====
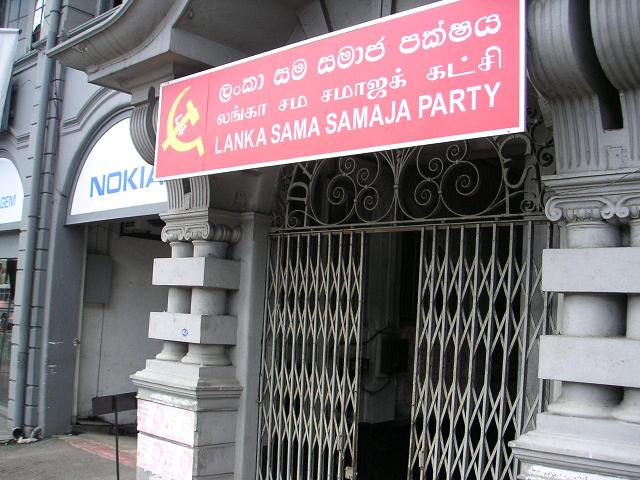
LSSP main office in Colombo, Sri Lanka

In Sri Lanka, a group of Trotskyists (known as the "T Group"), including South Asia's pioneer Trotskyist, Philip Gunawardena, who had been active in Trotskyist politics in Europe, and his colleague N. M. Perera, were instrumental in the foundation of the Lanka Sama Samaja Party (LSSP) in 1935. It expelled its pro-Moscow wing in 1940, becoming a Trotskyist-led party. After a prison break it helped form the short lived Bolshevik–Leninist Party of India, Ceylon and Burma (BLPI).

After the war, the Sri Lanka section split into the Lanka Sama Samaja Party and the Bolshevik Samasamaja Party (BSP). In the general election of 1947, the LSSP became the main opposition party, winning ten seats, the BSP winning a further 5. It joined the Trotskyist Fourth International after fusion with the BSP in 1950 and led a general strike (Hartal) in 1953.

In 1964 a faction of the LSSP broke away in response to the party joining the governing coalition of Sirimavo Bandaranaike and affiliated itself with the International Committee of the Fourth International who shared their critiques of Trotskyist parties joining bourgeois governments. In 1968 they would officially form the Revolutionary Communist League which would eventually become the Socialist Equality Party in 1996.

In 1974, a secret faction of the LSSP, allied to the Militant group in the United Kingdom, emerged. In 1977, this faction was expelled and formed the Nava Sama Samaja Party, led by Vasudeva Nanayakkara.

==== India ====
In 1942, following the escape of the leaders of the Sri Lankan LSSP from a British prison, a unified Bolshevik–Leninist Party of India, Ceylon and Burma (BLPI) was established in India, bringing together the many Trotskyist groups in the subcontinent. The BLPI was active in the Quit India Movement and the labour movement, capturing the second oldest union in India. Its high point was when it led the strikes which followed the Bombay Mutiny.

In India, the BLPI fractured. In 1948, at the Fourth International's request, the party's rump dissolved into the Congress Socialist Party as an exercise in entryism.

=== Europe ===
==== Spain ====
In the Spanish Civil War, Stalinist-directed NKVD oversaw purges of anti-Stalinist elements in the Spanish Republican forces including Trotskyist and anarchist factions. Notable cases involved the execution of Andreu Nin, former government minister in Revolutionary Catalonia, Jose Robles, a left-wing academic and translator along with many members of the Trotskyist-aligned POUM faction, such as Mary Stanley Low.

==== United Kingdom ====
The first major Trotskyist party in Britain was the Revolutionary Communist Party, founded in 1944. Its various splinters would make up the main history of the movement in the next decades, particularly those led by Ted Grant, Tony Cliff and Gerry Healy.

Gerry Healy's Workers Revolutionary Party was significant in the 1970s before collapsing into several micro-parties after revelations about sexual abuse of members by its leader in the mid-1980s.

During the 1980s, Ted Grant's entryist Militant group operated within the Labour Party with three members of parliament and effective control of Liverpool City Council, and was described by journalist Michael Crick as "Britain's fifth most important political party" in 1986. Over the years, it has had a number incarnations and splinters, the main ones being Scottish Militant Labour (1991–1997), Socialist Party (1997–present), Socialist Alternative (2019–present) and Socialist Appeal (1992–2024), which became the Revolutionary Communist Party.

One of the more prominent Trotskyist parties in Britain has been Tony Cliff's Socialist Workers Party, formerly the International Socialists (IS) and traces its history back to 1950. The SWP has helped found several organisations through which they have sought to exert influence over the broader left, such as the Anti-Nazi League in the late 1970s and the Stop the War Coalition in 2001. It also allied with George Galloway and Respect, whose dissolution in 2007 caused an internal crisis in the SWP. A more serious internal crisis, leading to a significant decline in the party's membership, emerged in 2013 over allegations of rape and sexual assault made against a leading party member.

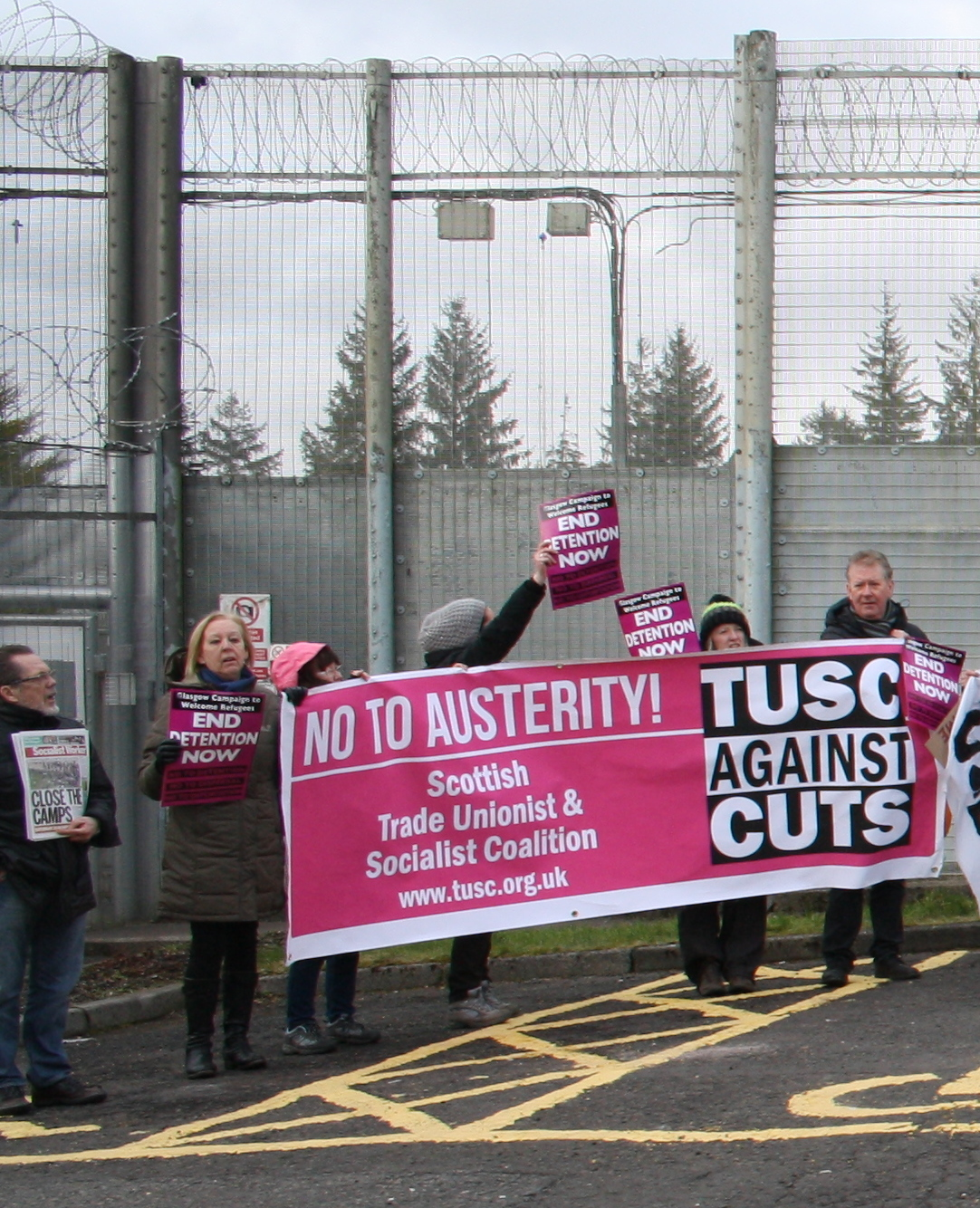
Scottish TUSC members protesting against the Dungavel Detention Centre

The Trade Unionist and Socialist Coalition (TUSC) was formed in 2010 between the Socialist Party, the SWP and Socialist Resistance, along with the RMT union, has participated in several general elections. The TUSC stood 40 candidates at the 2024 United Kingdom general election.

In April 2019, a 1970s splinter from IS made headlines when three former members of the Revolutionary Communist Party campaigned in the European Parliamentary election as candidates for the Brexit Party, and a fourth, Munira Mirza, was appointed head of the Number 10 Downing Street policy unit by the new Conservative Prime Minister Boris Johnson. The RCP's rejection of the SWP's critical engagement with the Labour Party and trade unions had morphed into embracing right-wing libertarian positions.

In 2017, political scientist John Kelly identified 22 Trotskyist parties active in the UK at that point, of which the SWP and Socialist Party were the largest. The other groups with over 100 members were: Counterfire, a split from the SWP focused heavily on anti-war and anti-imperialist coalitions, Socialist Appeal (now the Revolutionary Communist International), the Alliance for Workers' Liberty (AWL), belonging to the Shachtmanite/"Third Camp" tradition of Trotskyism, Socialist Resistance, the British section of the unified Fourth International and (Revolutionary Socialism in the 21st Century (rs21), another, less Leninist split from the SWP.

==== Ireland ====
The Socialist Party in Ireland was formed in 1996 by members who had been expelled from the Labour Party in 1989 under the leadership of Dick Spring. It achieved electoral success at the 1997 general election with the election of Joe Higgins in Dublin West. The Socialist Party has been part of electoral alliances such as the United Left Alliance, Solidarity and People Before Profit–Solidarity. As of 2024, it is represented at a national level by Mick Barry, a TD for Cork North-Central. It contests elections in Northern Ireland as part of the Cross-Community Labour Alternative.

==== Portugal ====
In Portugal's October 2015 parliamentary election, the Left Bloc won 550,945 votes, translating into 10.19% of the expressed votes and 19 (out of 230) deputados (members of parliament). Although founded by several leftist tendencies, it still expresses much of the Trotskyist thought upheld and developed by its former leader, Francisco Louçã.

==== Turkey ====
In Turkey, there are some Trotskyist organizations, including the International Socialist Tendency's section (Revolutionary Socialist Workers' Party). The International Committee of the Fourth International's Turkish section, the Socialist Equality Party (formerly the Socialist Equality Group), have held several public meetings on the history of the Trotskyist movement on Büyükada, also known as Prinkipo, an island in the Sea of Marmara that served as Trotsky's first exiled home from 1929 to 1933 after being deported from the USSR. In 2011 Trotsky's main residence on the island was designated as a public cultural facility by the Turkish Ministry of Culture with plans to turn it into a museum, an initative that has received support by the ICFI and been a focus of their meetings on the island.

==== Germany ====
A section of the International Committee of the Fourth International has existed in Germany since 1971, originally founded as the Federation of Socialist Workers (Bund Sozialistischer Arbeiter), it adopted its current name Socialist Equality Party (Sozialistische Gleichheitspartei) in 2017.

==== France ====
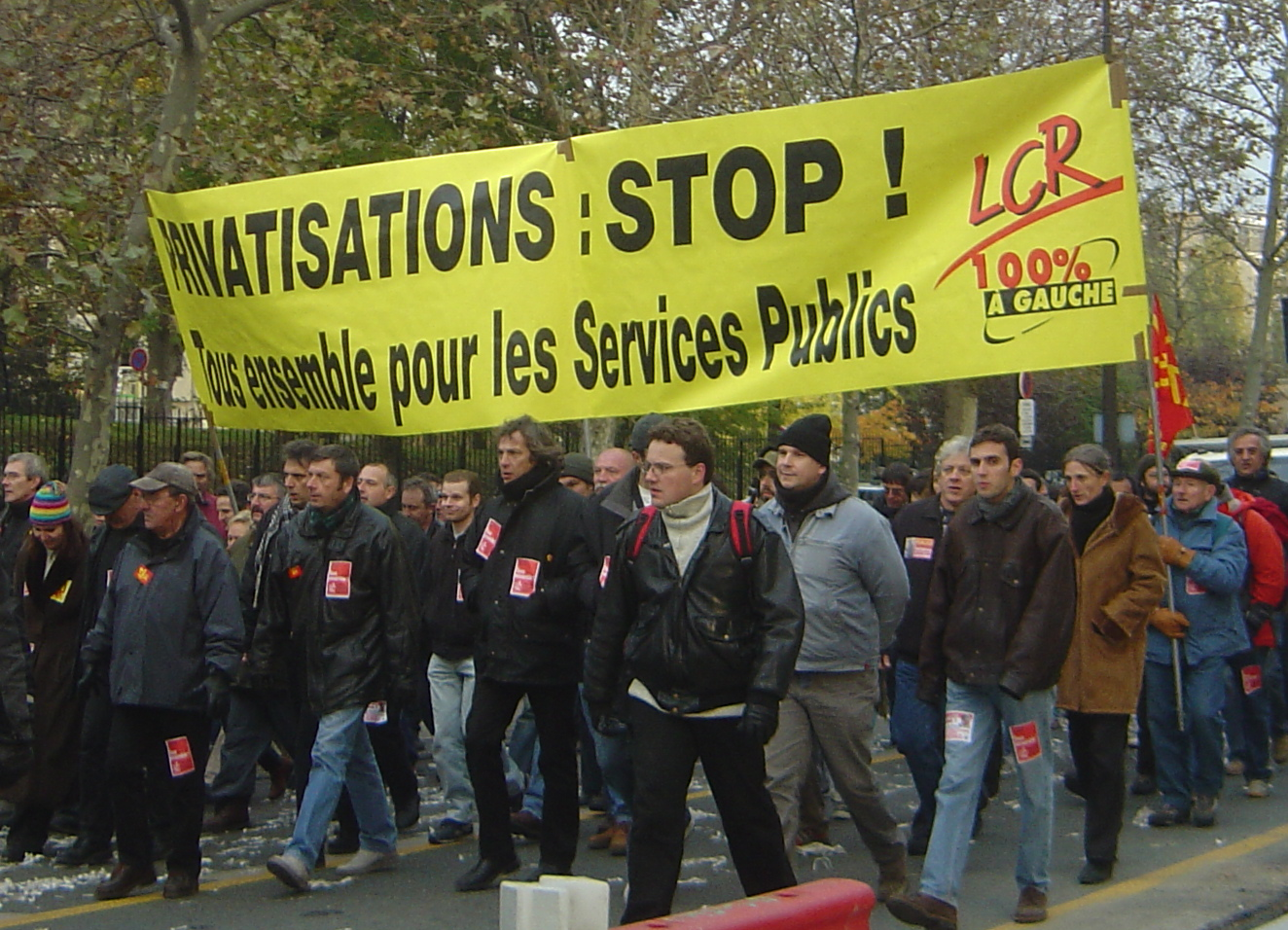
LCR protesters marching in a workforce demonstration in favour of public services and against privatization

The Communist League was formed in 1930, becoming the first Trotskyist group in the country. French Trotskyists have historically faced internal splits and external repression, notably during World War II when their activities were banned. Postwar, French Trotskyism was shaped by significant divisions, such as the 1952 split between Lambertist and Pabloist factions, reflecting global tensions within the Fourth International. The movement gained public attention during events like the May 1968 protests, where Trotskyist groups, including the Revolutionary Communist League (LCR), played a prominent role.

The French section of the Fourth International was the Internationalist Communist Party (PCI). In 1952 the party split when the Fourth International removed its Central Committee and split again when in 1953, the Fourth International itself divided. Further divisions occurred over which independence faction to support in the Algerian War. In 1967, the rump of the PCI renamed itself the "Internationalist Communist Organisation" (Organisation Communiste Internationaliste, OCI). It proliferated during the May 1968 student demonstrations but was banned alongside other far-left groups, such as the Gauche prolétarienne (Proletarian Left). Members temporarily reconstituted the group as the Trotskyist Organisation but soon obtained a state order permitting the reformation of the OCI. By 1970, the OCI was able to organise a 10,000-strong youth rally. The group also gained a strong base in trade unions. However, further splits and disintegration followed.

Today, France remains a hub for Trotskyist activity, represented by groups such as Lutte Ouvrière. In 2002, three trotskyist candidates ran in the election. Arlette Laguiller of Lutte Ouvrière got 5.72%, Olivier Besancenot of the Revolutionary Communist League (Ligue communiste révolutionnaire) got 4.25% and Daniel Gluckstein of the Workers' Party (Parti des Travailleurs) got 0.47%. In 2016 Jean-Luc Mélenchon, formerly of the ICO, launched the left-wing political platform La France Insoumise (Unbowed France), subsequently endorsed by several parties, including his own Left Party and the French Communist Party. In the 2017 French Presidential Election, he received 19% in the first round. In the same election, Philippe Poutou of the New Anticapitalist Party, into which the Revolutionary Communist League dissolved itself in 2008, won 1.20% of the vote. The only openly Trotskyist candidate, Nathalie Arthaud of Workers' Struggle, won 0.64% of the vote.

=== Oceania ===
==== Australia ====
The Workers Party, affiliated to the Left Opposition, was founded in May 1933 (described as "a tiny Sydney-based organisation made up largely of activists from the unemployed movement of the Depression years who had been in or around the CPA. The initial leading figure was former CPA Central Committee member Jack Sylvester, a leader of the Unemployed Workers Movement and the CPA’s small Workers Defence Corps, who had been expelled from the CPA in 1932"), pubishing its paper, The Militant, from December of that year. Its leaders included Nick Origlass (on the left of the party), Ted Tripp (at the centre of the party) and John Anderson (further to the right). Anderson, politically close to James Burnham, left the party and renounced Marxism. Tripp and his followers left in 1937, but re-united with the WPA to form the Communist League of Australia (CLA) in early 1939, shortly afterwards affiliated to the Fourth International. Origlass continued to lead small Trotskyist groups in the next decades, often working with the Australian Labour Party.

In the 1960s, during the time of the New Left and anti-Vietnam war movement, Trotskyism had a revival in the country. In Sydney in 1965 Bob Gould, Mairi Gould, and others who had split from Origlass formed the Vietnam Action Committee (VAC), and in 1967 organised the Third Worldist Trotksyist group Resistance. Within this, in 1970, the more explicitly Trotskysit Socialist Youth Alliance (SYA) was formedand in 1972 its “adult” organisation, the Socialist Workers League (SWL), incarnations and splinters of which would become the Socialist Workers Party, Democratic Socialist Party and then Socialist Alliance (Australia), as well as the Revolutionary Socialist Party that would later fuse with Socialist Alliance (Australia).

In 1969 a group calling itself Workers Action was founded with the intention of creating an Australian section of the International Committee of the Fourth International. They succeeded in doing so by 1972, at which point they adopted the name Socialist Labor League. Australian author and political activist Mick Armstrong noted that "the SLL may possibly have become the largest Trotskyist group, with a couple of hundred members in the mid-1970s". It officially adopted its current name, Socialist Equality Party (Australia), in 2010 as part of a wider move within the ICFI to standardize its party names. They gained national media attention in 2015 when a public meeting planned to be held at University of Sydney to discuss the "glorification and militarism of Anzac day" was cancelled by the university after receiving threats from the far-right Reclaim Australia group, becoming the second venue to do so for that reason.

Socialist Alliance was founded in 2001 as a loose alliance of Trotskyist and other socialist organisations and individuals. The project was initiated by the Democratic Socialist Perspective and the International Socialist Organisation. Seven other organisations were included in the initial exploratory meeting: the Freedom Socialist Party, Socialist Alternative, Socialist Democracy, Worker-communist Party of Iraq, Workers League, Worker's Liberty, and Worker's Power. The aim of the merger was to create greater left unity in the aftermath of the S11 protests of the World Economic Forum in Melbourne on 11–13 September 2000.

== Debated comparison with Stalinism ==
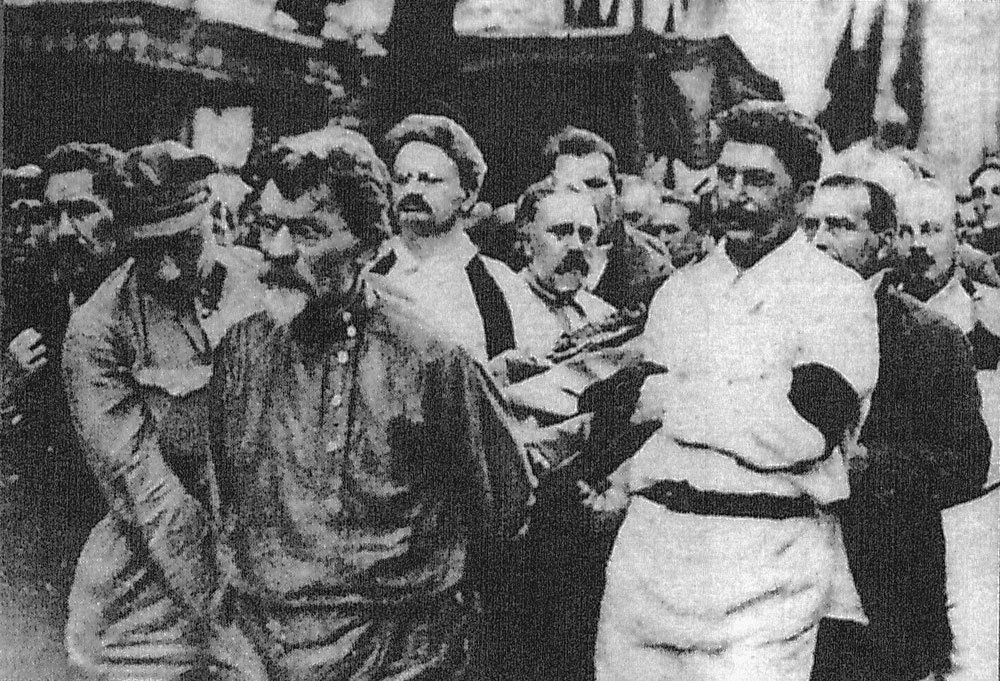
Kalinin and Stalin bearing the coffin of Felix Dzerzhinsky on 22 July 1926. Trotsky can be seen over Kalinin's left shoulder.

Some Western historians have regarded Trotsky as a forerunner to Stalinism and centred this notion on his record during the period of war communism, which included practices such as the militarization of labour. Criticism has also been levied at his support for concentration camps to detain war prisoners and the Red Terror. Other historians such as Robert Service, Dmitri Volkogonov, N.A. Vasetskii and Alter Litvin contend that Trotsky shared the same totalitarian strand of thought as Stalin and would not have represented a radically different USSR. Concerning the ideological differences between the varieties of Marxist philosophy that are Stalinism and Trotskyism, novelist George Orwell said:

The fact that Trotskyists are everywhere a persecuted minority, and that the accusation usually made against them, i.e. of collaborating with the Fascists, is obviously false, creates an impression that Trotskyism is intellectually and morally superior to Communism; but it is doubtful whether there is much difference.

However, literary critic Jeffrey Meyers, who reviewed the political allegories in Orwell's work, stated that:

"Orwell ignores the fact that Trotsky passionately opposed Stalin’s dictatorship from 1924 to 1940, which featured Siberian prison camps, the deliberately created Ukraine famine and the massive slaughter during the Moscow Purge Trials of 1937.”

“With all the greater frankness can I state how, in my view, the Soviet government should act in case of a fascist upheaval in Germany. In their place, I would, at the very moment of receiving telegraphic news of this event, sign a mobilisation order calling up several age groups. In the face of a mortal enemy, when the logic of the situation points to inevitable war, it would be irresponsible and unpardonable to give that enemy time to establish himself, to consolidate his positions, to conclude alliances… and to work out the plan to attack.”

— Trotsky describing the military measures he would have taken in place of Stalin to counter the rise of Nazi Germany in 1932.

Meyers further added that Orwell reinforced his arguments by using the views of a right-wing combatant. In contrast, Meyers cited Isaac Deutscher's biographical account of Trotsky, which presented him to be a much more civilised figure than Stalin and suggested that he would not have purged the Red Army generals or millions of Soviet citizens.

Historian Sheila Fitzpatrick has also questioned the premise of historical inevitability presented by conservative critics such as Robert Service in that the Soviet Union would have experienced the same "totalitarian despotism under Trotskyist rule". Fitzpatrick suggested it was implausible that Trotsky, like Stalin, would have launched an anti-semitic campaign after World War II or initiated the Great Purges. Rather, she inferred that Trotsky would presumably have provided good leadership during the Second World War but may have struggled to maintain party cohesion as seen during the succession struggle after 1924.

Moreover, several scholars such as Richard B.Day, Vadim Rogovin and Robert Vincent Daniels along with Western socialists have considered Trotsky to have represented a more democratic alternative to Stalin. In particular, emphasis has been drawn to his activities in the pre-Civil War period and as leader of the Left Opposition. Proponents of this view have specified further differences with Stalinism, which emerged during the succession struggle, over intraparty democracy, autonomy of the Comintern and the dogmatization of Leninist orthodoxy. Mandel and Deutscher maintain that his intra-party reforms from 1923 to 1926 would have revitalised party democratization, mass participation, worker's self-management and eventually a multi-party socialist democracy. Trotsky also opposed the policy of forced collectivisation under Stalin and favoured a voluntary, gradual approach towards agricultural production, with greater tolerance for the rights of Soviet Ukrainians. Daniels viewed Trotsky and the Left Opposition as a critical alternative to the Stalin-Bukharin majority in a number of areas. He also stated that the Left Opposition would have prioritised industrialisation but never contemplated the "violent uprooting" employed by Stalin and contrasted most directly with Stalinism on the issue of party democratization and bureaucratization.

Other figures such as Baruch Knei-Paz and Victor Serge acknowledge some affinities with Stalinism in regards to the use of coercion but have also recognised clear differences between Trotsky and Stalin. On the cultural field, Knei-Paz highlighted their contrasting attitudes towards matters such as the arts and sciences. According to Knei-Paz, it does not seem credible that Trotsky would have treated culture and society with the same total, brutal disregard as Stalin. He also argued that Trotsky sought far-reaching economic, commercial relations with European countries which was at variance with the economic policy of isolationism and harsher measures pursued under Stalin. In the view of Knei-Paz, the most discernible difference between Trotsky and Stalin was their respective approaches towards international affairs. In this matter, Trotsky firmly adhered to the notion that socialism in Russia, as “backward society” was dependent on revolution in the West. Biographer Geoffrey Swain believed that the Soviet Union under the leadership of Trotsky would have been more technocratic as he would have made far more use of "bourgeois experts" in the planning process, and inferred this from his conduct during the Civil War along with his writings in the early 1920s. Swain also expressed the view that the Soviet Union under Trotsky would certainly have been a less terrorised society yet was critical of his military methods in relation to desertion and hostage taking during the Civil War.

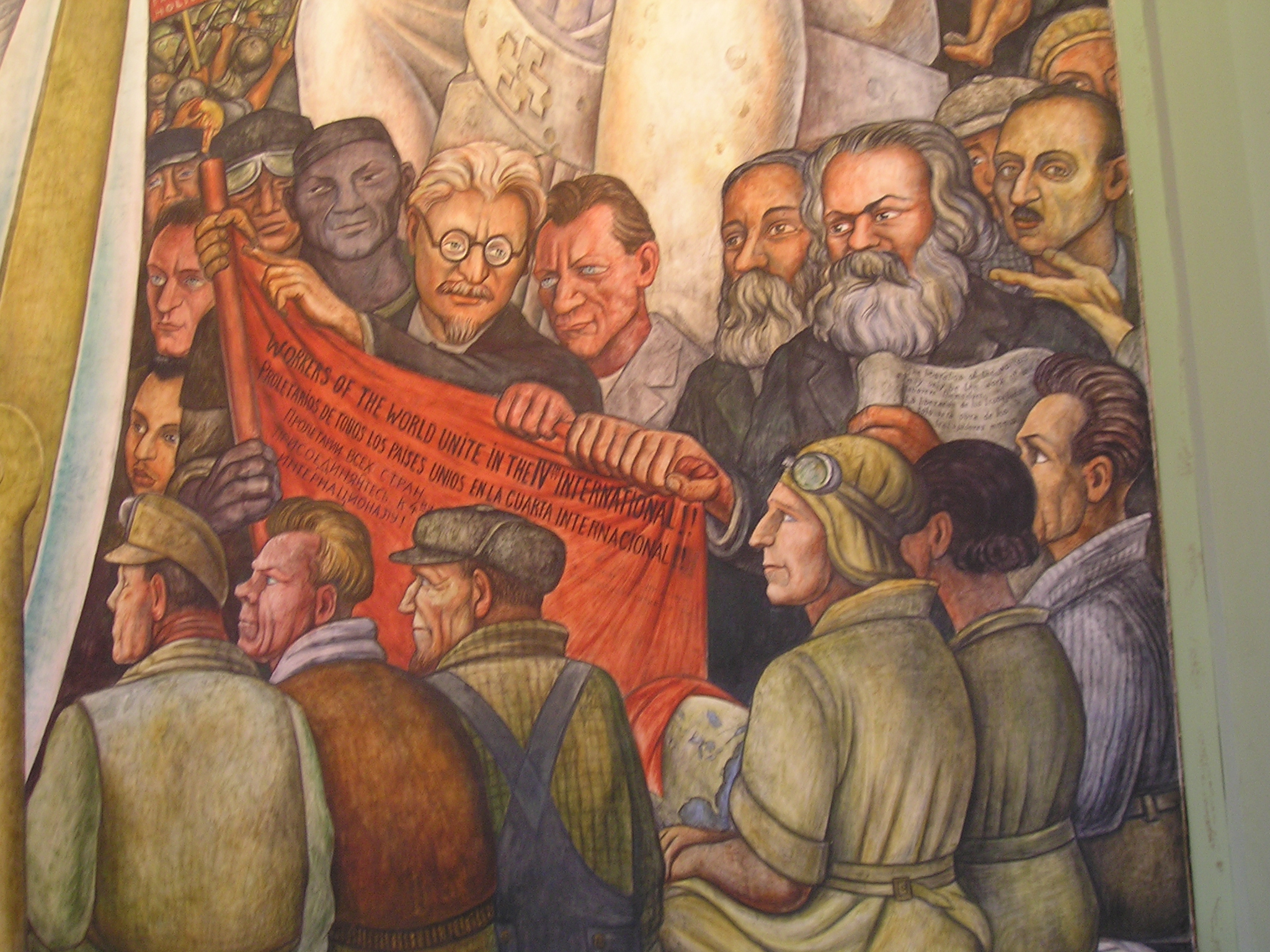
A Diego Rivera mural (Man, Controller of the Universe) depicts Trotsky with Marx and Engels as a true champion of the workers' struggle

In post-exile, Trotsky challenged claims from American socialist Norman Thomas that the Soviet Union would have been no better under his leadership. Trotsky countered that it was not a question of personalities but opposing, social interests represented by the bureaucracy and the working class. More specifically, Trotsky attributed the retraction of the progressive gains of the October revolution and the mass purge and Soviet foreign policy as seen in Spanish Civil War to the interests of the bureaucracy rather than the socialist proletariat or Bolshevik tradition. He asserted that the excessive form of totalitarianism under Stalinism would not have emerged under his variant of Bolshevism. Comparatively, he viewed his interpretation of Marxism to represent a political and moral regeneration of the Soviet Union against the Stalinist bureaucracy.

Separately, Trotsky would defend his military decisions as necessary, making a comparison between his military endeavours with Abraham Lincoln's ruthlessness during the American Civil War. Deutscher drew attention to the fact that Trotsky preferred to exchange hostages and prisoners rather than execute them. He recounts that Trotsky had released General Krasnov on parole in 1918 after the Kerensky–Krasnov uprising during the initial stage of the Civil War, but the general would take up arms against the Soviets shortly afterwards.

Trotskyist theoreticians have disputed the view that the Stalinist dictatorship was a natural outgrowth of the Bolsheviks' actions as most of the original, central committee members from 1917 were later eliminated by Stalin. George Novack stressed the initial efforts by the Bolsheviks to form a multi-party government with the Left Socialist Revolutionaries and bring other parties such as the Mensheviks into political legality. Upon the Menshevik walkout from the Soviet congress, Trotsky released a number of arrested, socialist ministers of the Provisional government from prison, at the request of Julius Martov. Tony Cliff argued the Bolshevik-Left Socialist Revolutionary coalition government dissolved the Constituent Assembly due to a number of reasons. They cited the outdated voter rolls, which did not acknowledge the split among the Socialist Revolutionary party and the assemblies' conflict with the Congress of the Soviets as an alternative democratic structure.

== Criticism ==
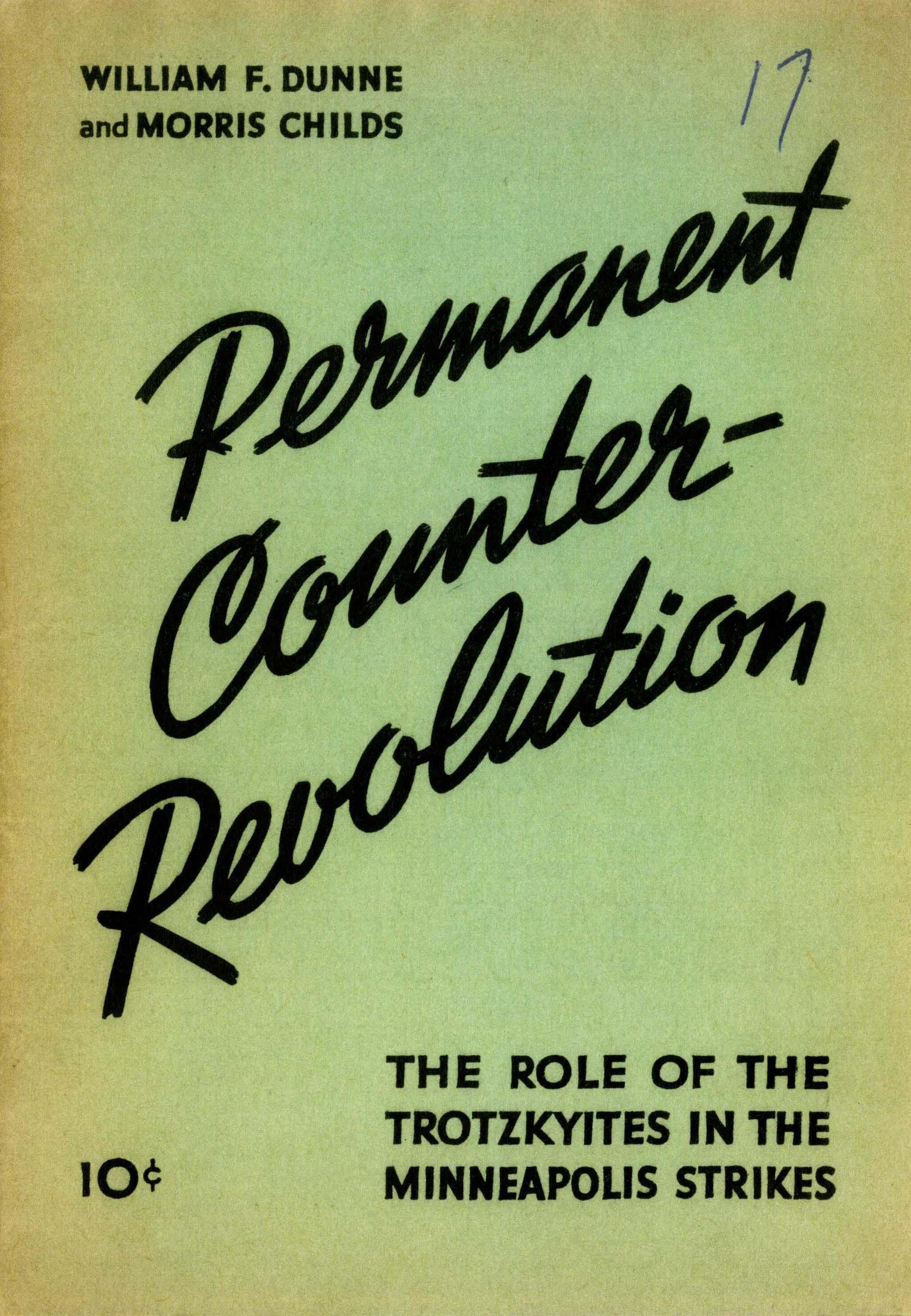
Cover of a 1934 Communist Party USA anti-Trotskyist pamphlet titled "Permanent Counter-Revolution"

Trotskyism has been criticised from various directions. In 1935, Marxist–Leninist Moissaye J. Olgin argued that Trotskyism was "the enemy of the working class" and "should be shunned by anybody who has sympathy for the revolutionary movement of the exploited and oppressed the world over." The African American Marxist–Leninist Harry Haywood, who spent much time in the USSR during the 1920s and 1930s, stated that although he had been somewhat interested in Trotsky's ideas when he was young, he came to see it as "a disruptive force on the fringes of the international revolutionary movement" which eventually developed into "a counter-revolutionary conspiracy against the Party and the Soviet state". He continued to put forward his following belief:

Trotsky was not defeated by bureaucratic decisions or Stalin's control of the Party apparatus—as his partisans and Trotskyite historians claim. He had his day in court and finally lost because his whole position flew in the face of Soviet and world realities. He was doomed to defeat because his ideas were incorrect and failed to conform to objective conditions, as well as the needs and interests of the Soviet people.

Other figures associated with Marxism–Leninism criticized Trotskyist political theory, including Régis Debray and Earl Browder.

In 1966, Fidel Castro said that "Even though at one time Trotskyism represented an erroneous position, but a position in the field of political ideas, Trotskyism became during the following years a vulgar instrument of imperialism and reaction."

Polish philosopher Leszek Kołakowski wrote: "Both Trotsky and Bukharin were emphatic in their assurances that forced labour was an organic part of the new society."

Sociologist Peter Beilharz was critical of Trotskyism and viewed it as the most complete expression of Jacobinism. Although, Beiharz acknowledged that Trotsky had opposed Jacobinism as a young democrat but in his view had extended the tradition during the period of war communism and through his ideological defence of terror. On the other hand, historian Paul Le Blanc found Beilharz's historical comparisons between Trotsky and earlier Jacobin figures to be unconvincing and suggested his analogies were more centred in rhetoric rather than in analysis due to his blurring of ideological concepts.

Some left communists, such as Paul Mattick, claim that the October Revolution was totalitarian from the start. Therefore, Trotskyism has no fundamental differences from Stalinism in practice or theory. French historian and Trotskyist Pierre Broue rejected this form of criticism and characterised it in the following way:

"The theory according to which Stalin and Trotsky were two rival wild beasts is useful for historians serving those in power: the establishment of an equivalence between Stalinism and Trotskyism aids the idea of a continuity from Bolshevism and Leninism to Stalinism and strengthens a regime which fears revolutionary sentiments".

British historian Christian Høgsbjerg believed that the academic literature and wider criticisms of Trotskyist organisations had minimised their historical role in building wider social movements. Høgsbjerg stressed the key role of British Trotskyists in various movements such as the Vietnam Solidarity Campaign (1966–71), the Anti-Nazi League (1977–81), the Anti Poll Tax Federation (1989–91) and the Stop the War Coalition (2001).

In the United States, Dwight Macdonald broke with Trotsky and left the Trotskyist Socialist Workers Party by raising the question of the Kronstadt rebellion, which Trotsky, as leader of the Soviet Red Army, and the other Bolsheviks had brutally repressed. He then moved towards democratic socialism and anarchism. The Lithuanian-American anarchist Emma Goldman raised a similar critique of Trotsky's role in the events around the Kronstadt rebellion. In her essay "Trotsky Protests Too Much", she says: "I admit, the dictatorship under Stalin's rule has become monstrous. That does not, however, lessen the guilt of Leon Trotsky as one of the actors in the revolutionary drama of which Kronstadt was one of the bloodiest scenes".

Trotsky defended the actions of the Red Army in his essay "Hue and Cry over Kronstadt". He would also argue that the attitudes and social composition of the Kronstadt sailors had changed during the Civil War. Trotsky further argued that the isolated location of the naval fortress would have enabled financial funding to flow between Kronstadt and White army emigres. Separately, he would also argue that he and Lenin had intended to lift the ban on the opposition parties such as the Mensheviks and Socialist Revolutionaries as soon as the economic and social conditions of Soviet Russia had improved after the Civil War.

== See also ==
- Anti-Stalinist left
- Democratic communism
- Far-left politics in the United Kingdom
- Fourth International
- Fifth International
- Left Opposition
- Lenin's Testament
- Leon Trotsky and the politics of economic isolation
- Leon Trotsky bibliography
- Neo-Stalinism
- Moscow Trials
- Orthodox Trotskyism
- Political revolution (Trotskyism)
- Red Army
- Socialist democracy
- Soviet democracy
- Socialist economics
- Third Camp
- French Turn
- The Social and Political Thought of Leon Trotsky
- Trotskyism in Vietnam
- Case of the Trotskyist Anti-Soviet Military Organization
- World socialism
- United Opposition
