= Leon Trotsky and the Politics of Economic Isolation =

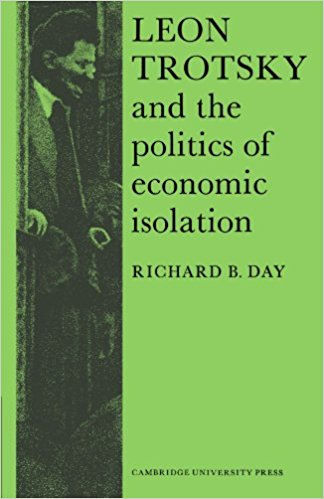
- Cover of the second edition (2004)
- Author: Richard B. Day
- Subject: Russian history
- Publisher: Cambridge University Press
- Publication date: 1973
- Pages: 221
- ISBN: 9780521524360

Leon Trotsky and the Politics of Economic Isolation is a 1973 economic history book by professor Richard B. Day about economic views of Leon Trotsky.
