= Wang Fanxi =

Chinese revolutionary (1907–2002)

Wang Fanxi (Chinese: 王凡西; pinyin: Wáng Fánxī; March 16, 1907 – December 30, 2002) was a leading Chinese Trotskyist revolutionary.

Born near Hangzhou in Zhejiang province, he joined the Chinese Communist Party (CCP), then an illegal organization, in 1925. In 1927, he went to Moscow to study at the Communist University of the Toilers of the East. There he became a supporter of Trotsky and the International Left Opposition. On his return to China, Wang worked for the CCP and became a leading member of the Trotskyist October Group, and then the Chinese Left Opposition. He was jailed for most of the period from 1931 and 1937, and was expelled from the CCP for his views.

In 1941, the Chinese Left Opposition split and Wang and others formed the Communist League (Internationalist), which became the Internationalist Workers Party of China in 1949. That year, he was sent to Hong Kong to act as an international link for the group, but was soon exiled to Macau. He wrote extensively and remained an influential figure, aligned with the United Secretariat of the Fourth International. In 1975, he was forced to move again, and he emigrated to Leeds, England, where he died on December 30, 2002.

== Works ==
- Mao Zedong Thought
- Wang Fan-hsi: Chinese Revolutionary, Memoirs 1919-1949
- Studies on the Thought of Mao Tse-Tung
- Problems of Chinese Trotskyism
