= Leon Trotsky bibliography =

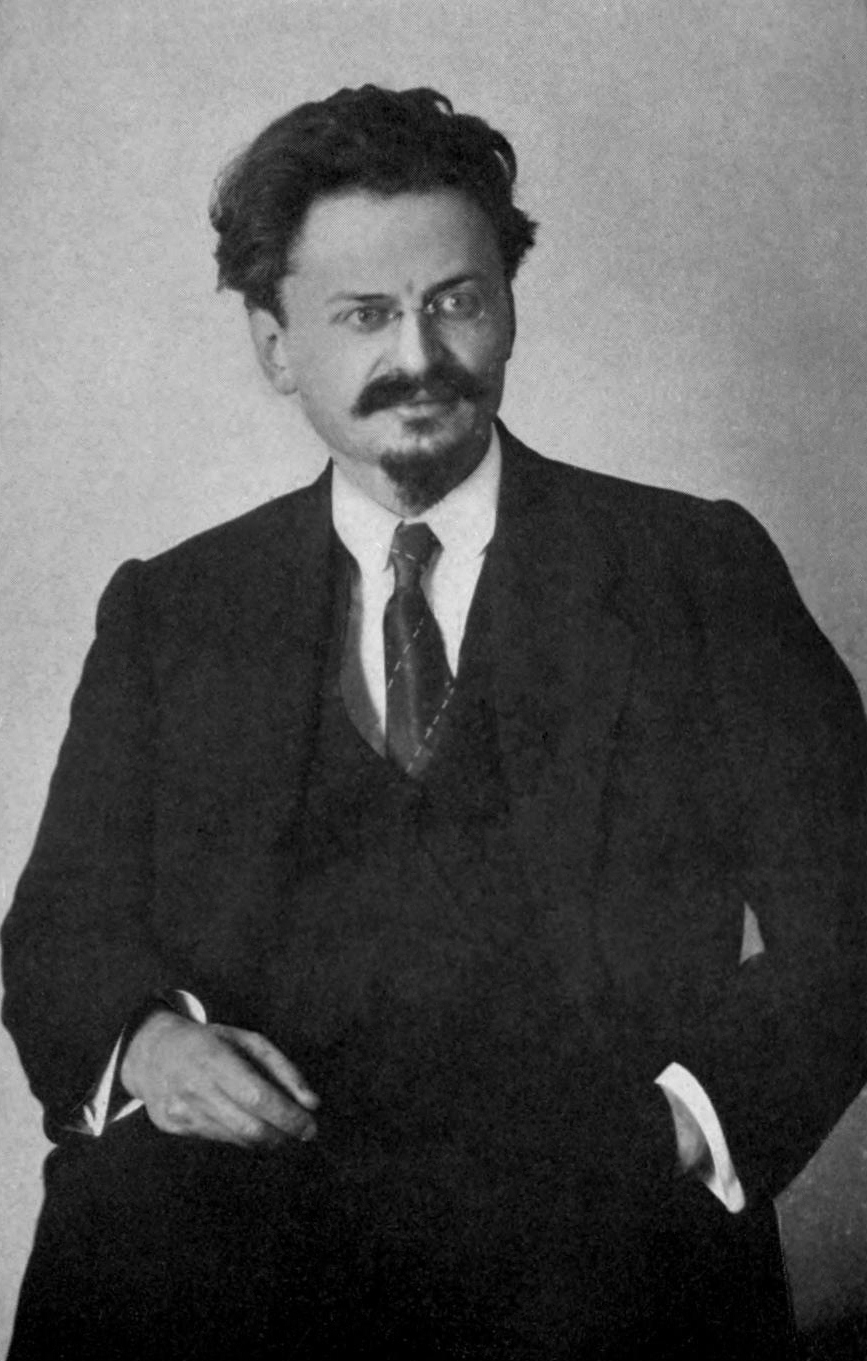
Leon Trotsky as he appeared in 1920.

The following is a chronological list of books by Leon Trotsky, a Marxist theoretician, including hardcover and paperback books and pamphlets published during his life and posthumously during the years immediately following his assassination in 1940. Included are the original Russian or German language titles and publication information, as well as the name and publication information of the first English language edition.

In the course of his life, Trotsky wrote about 30,000 documents, most of which are contained in various archives. According to his biographer Isaac Deutscher, Trotsky wrote most of the Soviet's manifestos and resolutions, and edited its Izvestia newspaper.

This material represents a small fraction of the myriad of articles published by Trotsky during his life and afterwards, with the complete 1989 bibliography by Louis Sinclair running to nearly 1,100 printed pages.

Maxim Lieber was Trotsky's literary agent at the end of his life.

== Books and pamphlets ==
Source (unless otherwise noted): Baruch Knei-Paz, The Social and Political Thought of Leon Trotsky. Oxford, England: Oxford University Press, 1978; pp. 601–605, checked to Louis Sinclair, Trotsky: A Bibliography. In two volumes. London: Scolar Press, 1989.

=== Pre-revolutionary period (1903–1916) ===
1. Vtoroi S"ezd RSDRP: Otchet Sibirskoi Delegatsii (The Second Congress of the RSDRP: Report of the Siberian Delegation). Geneva: 1903.

English translation: Report of the Siberian Delegation. London: New Park Publications, 1979.

2. Nashi Politicheskye Zadachi (Our Political Tasks). Geneva: 1904.

English translation: Our Political Tasks. London: New Park Publications, n.d. [c. 1979].

3. Do 9-go Ianvaria (Until the 9th of January). Geneva: 1905.

4. Nasha Revoliutsiia (Our Revolution). St. Petersburg: N. Glagolev, 1906.

5. Istoriia Soveta Rabochikh Deputatov v Gorode Sanktpeterburga (History of the Soviet of Workers' Deputies in the City of St. Petersburg). (Editor.) St. Petersburg: 1906.

6. V Zashchitu Partiii (In Defense of the Party). St. Petersburg: 1907.

7. Tuda i Obratno (There and Back Again). St. Petersburg: Shipovnik, 1907.

My Flight from Siberia. New York: American Library Service, 1925.

8. Der Krieg und die Internatsionale (The War and the International). Zurich: 1914.

English translation: The Bolsheviki and World Peace. New York: Boni and Liveright, 1918.

=== Revolutionary period (1917–1928) ===
9. Programma Mira (The Program of Peace). Petrograd: 1917.

10. Istoriia Oktiabrskoi Revoliutsii (History of the October Revolution). Petrograd: 1918.

English translation: The History of the Russian Revolution to Brest-Litovsk. London: George Allen and Unwin, 1919.

11. Itogi i Perspektivy (Results and Prospects). Moscow: 1919.

English translation: The Permanent Revolution and Results and Prospects. London: 1962.

12. Godi Velikogo Pereloma: Liudi Staroi i Novoi Epokh (Years of the Great Break: The People of the Old and New Epochs). Moscow: 1919.

13. Terrorismus und Kommunismus: Anti-Kautsky (Terrorism and Communism: Against Kautsky). Hamburg: 1920.

English translation: The Defense of Terrorism (Terrorism and Communism): A Reply to Kautsky. London: George Allen & Unwin, 1935.

14. Novyi Etap (The New Stage). Moscow: 1921.

15. Mezhdu Imperializmom i Revoiutsiei (Between Imperialism and Revolution). Moscow: 1922.

English translation: Between Red and White. London: 1922.

16. Voprosy Byta (Questions of Life). Moscow: 1923.

English translation: Problems of Everyday Life. London: Methuen & Co., 1924.

17. Kommunisticheskoe Dvizhenie v Frantsii (The Communist Movement in France). Moscow: 1923.

18. Literatura i Revoliutsiia (Literature and Revolution). Moscow: 1923.

English translation: Literature and Revolution. New York: International Publishers, 1925.

19. Voina i Revoliutsiia (The War and the Revolution). In two volumes. Moscow: 1923–1924.

20. Kak Vooruzhalas' Revoliutsiia (How the Revolution Armed Itself). Three volumes in five parts. Moscow: 1923–1925.

English translation: How the Revolution Armed. In five volumes. London: New Park, 1973.

21. Pokolenie Oktiabria (The October Generation). Moscow: 1924.

22. Zapad i Vostok (West and East). Moscow: 1924.

23. Piat' Let Kominterna (Five Years of the Comintern). Moscow: 1924.

English translation: The First Five Years of the Communist International. In two volumes. New York: Pioneer Publishers, 1945, 1953.

24. Novyi Kurs (The New Course). Moscow: 1924.

English translation: The New Course. New York: New International Publishing Co., 1943.

25. O Lenine: Materialy dlia Biografa (On Lenin: Material for a Biography). Moscow: 1924.

English translation: Lenin. New York: Minton, Balch & Co., 1925.

26. Uroki Oktiabria (Lessons of October). Berlin: 1925.

English translations: UK: The Lessons of October 1917. London: Labour Publishing Co., 1925; USA: Lessons of October. New York: Pioneer Publishers, 1937.

27. 1905. Moscow: 1925.

English translation: 1905. New York: Random House, 1971.

28. Kuda Idet Angliia? (Where is England Going?) Moscow: 1925.

English translations: Whither England? New York: International Publishers, 1925; Where Is Britain Going? London: Communist Party of Great Britain, 1926.

29. K Sotsializmu ili k Kapitaliszmu: Analiz Sovetskogo Khoziaistva i Tendentsii Ego Razvitiia (Toward Socialism or Capitalism? An Analysis of the Soviet Economy and Tendencies Toward Its Development) (Towards Socialism or Capitalism). Moscow: Gosizdat, 1925.

English translation: Towards Socialism or Capitalism? London: 1926.

30. Evropa i Amerika (Europe and America). Moscow: 1926.

31. The Real Situation in Russia. New York: Harcourt, Brace and Co., 1928.

=== Exile period (1929–1940) ===
32. Chto i Kak Proizoshlo? (What Happened and How?) Paris: 1929.

33. Moia Zhizn' (My Life). Berlin: 1930.

English translation: My Life. New York: Charles Scribner's Sons, 1930.

34. Permanentnaia Revoliutsiia (The Permanent Revolution). Berlin: 1930.

English translation: The Permanent Revolution.

35. Istoriia Russkoi Revoliutsii (History of the Russian Revolution). In two volumes. Berlin: 1931 and 1933.

English translation: History of the Russian Revolution. In three volumes. New York: Simon and Schuster, 1932.

36. Nemetskaia Revoliutsiia i Stalinskaia Biurokratiia (The German Revolution and the Stalinist Bureaucracy). Berlin: 1932.

37. Problems of Chinese Revolution. New York: Pioneer Publishers, 1932.

38. Stalinskaia Shkola Falsifikatsii (The Stalinist School of Falsification). Berlin: 1932.

The Stalin School of Falsification. New York: Pioneer Publishers, 1932.

39. What Hitler Wants. New York: John Day Company, 1933.

40. The Only Road. New York: Pioneer Publishers, 1933.

41. Chetvertyi Internatsional i Voina. (The Fourth International and War). Geneva: 1934.

42. Où va la France? Recueil d'articles. (Whither France? Collected Articles.) Paris: Librairie du travail, 1936.

Whither France? New York: Pioneer Publishers, 1936.

43. Vie de Lenine: Jeunesse. Paris: 1936.

English translation: The Young Lenin. Garden City, NY: Doubleday and Co., 1972.

44. The Third International After Lenin. New York: Pioneer Publishers, 1936.

45. The Revolution Betrayed: What is the Soviet Union and Where is It Going? New York: Doubleday, Doran and Co., 1937.

46. The Case of Leon Trotsky: Report of Hearings on the Charges Made Against Him at the Moscow Trials: Verbatum Transcript of Trotsky's Testimony Before the Dewey Commission, Coyoacan, Mexico, April 10–17, 1937. (John Dewey and Suzanne LaFollette et al., eds.). New York: Pioneer Publishers, 1937.

47. Their Morals and Ours: The class foundations of moral practice Pathfinder Books, 1937.

48. The Transitional Program, 1938.

49. The Living Thoughts of Karl Marx: Based on Capital: A Critique of Political Economy. (Editor.) London: Cassell and Co., 1940.

=== Posthumous publications ===
49. Stalin's gangsters. Mexico: Editorial America, September 1940.

50. Stalin: An Appraisal of the Man and His Influence [1941]. New York: Harper and Brothers, 1946.

51. In Defence of Marxism. New York: Pioneer Publishers, 1942.

52. The Trotsky Papers, 1917-1922. In two volumes. The Hague: Mouton and Co., 1964.

53. The Struggle Against Fascism in Germany based on Trotsky's writings of 1931–1940. New York: Pathfinder Press, 1971. —Includes material not in Writings collection.

54. The Spanish Revolution, 1931-1939. New York: Pathfinder Press, 1973. —Includes material not in Writings collection.

55. Writings of Leon Trotsky. New York: Pathfinder Press, 19—. —Fourteen volume collection of articles and letters, 1929–1940.

56. The Challenge of the Left Opposition (1923-25). New York: Pathfinder Press, 1975.

57. Leon Trotsky on China. New York: Pathfinder Press, 1976. —Includes 53 articles not included in Problems of Chinese Revolution or Writings.

58. Trotsky's Diary in Exile, 1935. Cambridge, MA: Harvard University Press, 1976.

59. The Crisis of the French Section (1935-36). New York: Pathfinder Press, 1977. —Includes material not in Writings collection.

60. The Balkan Wars, 1912-13: The War Correspondence of Leon Trotsky. New York: Monad Press, 1980.

61. The Challenge of the Left Opposition (1926-27). New York: Pathfinder Press, 1980.

62. The Challenge of the Left Opposition (1928-29). New York: Pathfinder Press, 1981.

63. Trotsky's Notebooks, 1933-1935: Writings on Lenin, Dialectics, and Evolutionism. New York: Columbia University Press, 1986.

64. Arkhiv Trotskogo: Iz Arkhivov revoliutsii, 1927-28. (The Trotsky Archive: From the Archives of the Revolution, 1927–28.) In two volumes. Kharkov, Ukraine: OKO, 1999, 2001.
