= Problems of Everyday Life =

1973 book by Leon Trotsky

- Author: Leon Trotsky
- Original title: Problems of Everyday Life: Creating the foundations for a new society in revolutionary Russia
- Translator: George Novack, G. Fidler
- Language: Russian
- Genre: Nonfiction
- Publisher: Pathfinder Press (America), Monad Press
- Publication date: 1973
- Publication place: Soviet Union
- Media type: Print

Problems of Everyday Life: Creating the Foundations for A New Society in Revolutionary Russia or Problems of Every Day Life: And Other Writings on Culture and Science are a selection of articles and party speeches by Russian revolutionary Leon Trotsky on a variety of cultural and scientific matters.

These collections documented his perspective from the closing interlude of the Civil War in 1923 until his final years in exile in Mexico from 1937–1940. In these writings, Trotsky presented his views on a number of cultural areas which relate to aesthetic art, civility in public life, the emancipation of women, universal education, science and technology and dialectical materialism.

In the interregnum period following the Russian Civil War, Trotsky diverted his personal attention towards cultural matters as a foundational element of socialist reconstruction.

== Historical Background ==
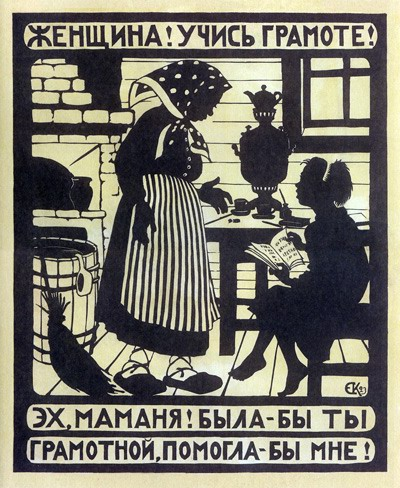
"- Woman, learn to read and write! - Oh, mother! If you were literate, you could help me!" A Soviet poster by Elizaveta Kruglikova advocating female literacy, 1923.

Throughout the 1920s, Trotsky would evaluate the challenges such as widespread illiteracy, regressive customs and the early cultural advancements of the October Revolution. This was associated with universal education, healthcare, women’s rights and the ideological prioritisation of science and technology.

Trotsky had completed his book Literature and Revolution in 1924 for which he expounded his views on literature trends, artistic autonomy and the expected role of the Bolshevik party. Following discussions with other party associates in Moscow, he issued a series of articles for Pravda that examined other cultural elements of Soviet life such as public manners and morals. These articles were formalised and published under the title “Problems of Everyday Life”.

As Trotsky became increasingly marginalised during his factional struggle with Joseph Stalin, he continued to expand the scope of his cultural writings on scientific matters as a member of the Board for Electrotechnical Development and the Committee for Industry and Technology. In particular, he outlined his views on Ivan Pavlov’s theory of conditioning, the use of the radio, chemistry and hydro-dynamics in alignment with Soviet development and scientific socialism through a series of party addresses between 1925 and 1926.

In the final years of his exile, Trotsky examined the role of art and philosophy in relation to the Leninist party and dialectical materialism. He continued to express strong criticisms of Stalin’s leadership which he characterised as totalitarian and bureaucratic, with several conservative practices having been reintroduced under Stalin including legal restrictions of female rights, stratified notions of family roles and the prohibition of abortion.

== Overview ==
=== Part 1: Problems of everyday life ===
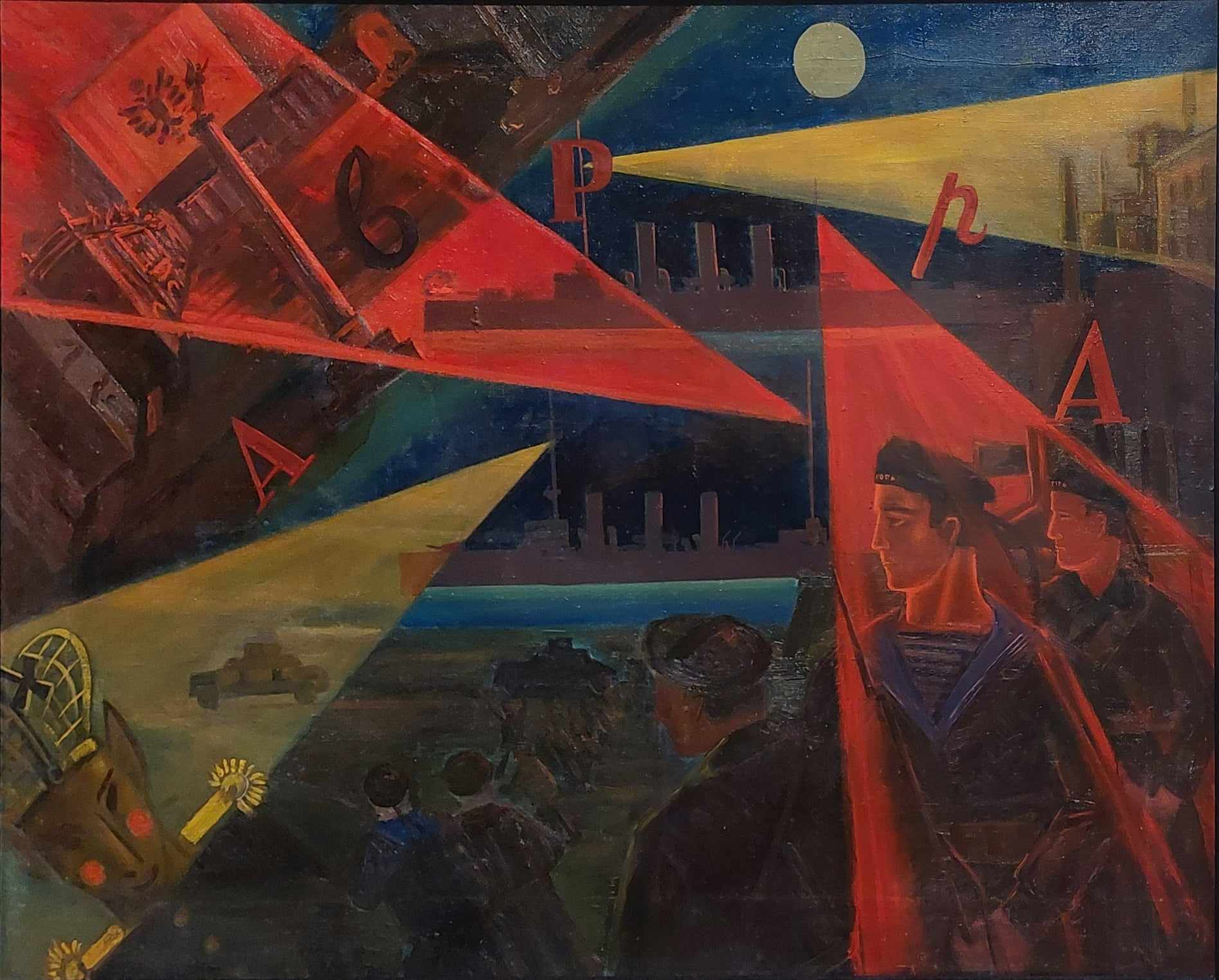
Soviet-Ukrainian avant-garde painting The Overthrow of the Autocracy circa Russian Revolution

In the view of political scientist Baruch Knei-Paz, Trotsky ascribed the task of the Soviet state in 1923 to gradually nurturing the conditions for a new socialist culture as an expression of material developments rather than hastily constructing a “new man” detached from his social context. Instead, Trotsky believed it was necessary to induce younger party members and through education in general the appropriate appreciation of everyday politics and participation.

Trotsky placed considerable weight on mass cultural habits and customs such as abusive language and swearing for which he rooted in the Tsarist bureaucratic and hierarchical tradition. According to Trotsky, common civilians were subject to disdain, slavery and humiliation for human dignity which became embedded in cultural life. Trotsky viewed the October Revolution to have an emancipatory impact and argued for the necessity of civility, good manners as essential aspects of society.

Another area of focus in Trotsky’s writings was the role of women and the traditional family unit. Trotsky approached the subject matter with a focus on completing sexual equality in which women were emancipated from traditional duties and became an active agent in political life. At the same time, Trotsky cautioned that this pace of change depended on the economic foundations and the degree to which traditional female duties had been supplanted by public institutions. Concurrently, he discussed the challenges of replacing the traditional family with a new conception of family and hence suggested that the preferred approach should be within practical and possible boundaries.

Trotsky also commented on the translation of his writings for Soviet ethnic communities such as Tatar language and its appeal for cultural and economic underdevelopment of autonomous communities in the East.

=== Part 2: Education and Culture ===
Why did we take power earlier in Russia, we, the communists ? Because we had a weaker enemy - the bourgeoisie. In what way was it weak ? It was not as rich and cultured as the English bourgeoisie, which has at its disposal huge funds, both of money and of culture, and also great experience in dealing with the masses and subjugating them politically.

— Trotsky's speech to the First All-Union Congress of Librarians, delivered in 1924.

In relation to education and culture, Trotsky examined the prevalence of mass illiteracy in both the Soviet populace and Red Army. He described the need for worker correspondents to raise the cultural level of the masses, abolish mass illiteracy, mitigate public alcoholism, develop the quality of article publications and express the internationalist perspectives of worker movements across the world.

In this section, Trotsky surveyed the challenges of uprooting traditional practices which were irreconcilable to rationalism and progress for which he associated with institutional religion. Specifically, he viewed the latter to have a sedative influence on the masses and perpetuated historical residues of superstition, ignorance and apathy for mass struggle for a new society. As an alternative, Trotsky had advanced for a continued secularisation of social life in which other forms of cultural mediums such as entertainment, amusement and attractions could facilitate the creative development of the Soviet public.

In the latter section of his book, he expressed warning on an excessive use of the state in solving cultural matters and the artificial imposition of social norms from above. Rather, he favoured the role of the state in facilitating the evolution of cultural trends in conjunction with voluntary associations and personal initiatives for a new mass culture.

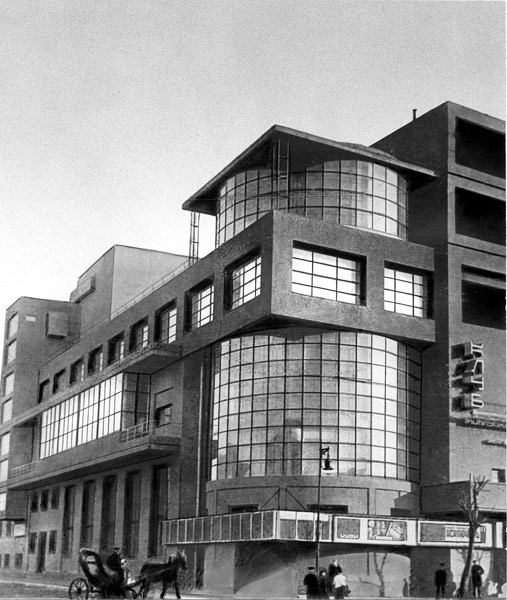
Zuev Workers' Club - Moscow (1928)

A notable observation in his writings on mass culture was the prospect of revolution in the West. In this analysis, Trotsky believed that conditions for a revolution in Tsarist Russia were considerably more favourable than in Western European countries such as England due to the relative failure of capitalism to take root in Russia.

In this respect, he attributed this fragile equilibrium to the recent emergence of a Russian bourgeoisie and absence of shared traditions with the Russian workers. At the same time, Trotsky argued this course of events held its own set of inherent disadvantages because of the historical backwardness of Russia and consequently made it much more difficult to inaugurate socialist construction.

In parallel, Trotsky believed that as capitalism was long established in Western Europe, the proletariat of those societies were much more culturally acculturated with bourgeois habits and reformist traditions and hence more attached to the existing system. Consequently, this in turn made the revolutionary process in those respective countries more difficult. Nevertheless, Trotsky argued that due to the cultural and economic advantages that Western Europe had accumulated over centuries that this in turn would make the potentiality of socialist construction more achievable.

=== Part 3: Science and Technology ===
Trotsky also stated that cultural development would accentuate industrial and technical progress. He viewed both elements to be interrelated components as part of dialectical interaction in which he viewed the low level of Russian technique and expertise to be a function of cultural backwardness. According to Trotsky, Western industrial techniques and products such as the radio should not be rejected due to their status as a product of a capitalist system but rather absorbed into the Soviet socialist framework to facilitate new forms of techniques and cultural production. In this interpretation, the transference of techniques brought new cultural changes in terms of rationalism, efficiency, exactitude and quality.

Throughout the 1920s, Trotsky stressed the strong compatibility between the philosophy of science and dialectical materialism. This was most exemplified in a public speech he delivered to a scientific congress in 1925 commemorating Russian scientist, Dimitri Mendeleev, who is responsible for the conception of the periodic table. Trotsky, whilst criticising the conservative social outlook of major scientists such as Mendeleev and Charles Darwin, believed the wider implications of their scientific theories such as the theory of evolution had in fact confirmed the notion of dialectics in which quantitative changes resulted in pronounced qualitative changes.

He next discussed the prospects of scientific research in the early Soviet Union. Trotsky weighed this favourably against earlier societies in which science was subsumed to the interests of institutional religion, capitalist warfare and personal proprietors. Comparatively, he believed that scientific disciplines such as chemistry, physics and psychology would greatly benefit from state patronage and the substantial network of technical scientific institutes established under the Soviet Union at the time would represent a prelude to future possibilities.

Towards the later section, Trotsky linked science in association with culture and socialism. He presented the view that there is a dialectical interaction between technology and material culture with the former serving as the basis for the latter which in turn stimulated the growth of technology.

Trotsky also referenced the cultural value of public institutions such as the Leningrad Public Library due to its collection of books which had now been nationalised and made fully accessible to the Soviet populace. He continued to reiterate the importance of science for industrial development through the use of electricity, railway infrastructure and socialist method of planning as well as the means of communications with innovative techniques such as radioactivity and cinematography.

=== Part 4: The materialist outlook ===
The final collection of his writings derived from his period in exile between 1937–1939. In this period, he expressed his perspective on the exact role of the Leninist party in relation to art and philosophy. Trotsky insisted that the party should maintain a wide scope of personal and creative autonomy for figures in those respective fields.

Congruently, he believed the party should reconcile this with political considerations in the event some of these philosophical developments are overtly hostile to “the revolutionary tasks of the proletariat”, He also contrasted the approach of Vladimir Lenin with Stalin on the subject matter.

Trotsky also advanced his notion of a curve of capitalist development with an accompanying schematic chart. Through this concept, Trotsky attempted to track the interplay between intervals of social events (superstructure) and material breaking points in the capitalist development over an industrial cycle. Trotsky reserved some criticism for Professor Nikolai’s Kondratiev statistical analysis for projecting the same trend assumptions in both major and minor industrial cycles and his conclusions requiring further verification.

Trotsky then concluded his focus on the “ABC of dialectical materialism” in 1939 outlining the fundamental principles of the philosophy such as the logic of motion and its explanatory, scientific value in analysing continuous, material change through the dialectical process of quantitative and quality transformation.

== Reception and evaluation ==
Trotsky’s writings on the Problem of Everyday Life have been credited with expanding the scope of political discourse in the Soviet Union around the construction of cultural life.

Professor Alan Wald cited the Problem of Everyday Life among several literary outputs such as Literature and Revolution to have accentuated Trotsky’s wider appeal to groups such as the New York Intellectuals. He stated that Trotsky presented robust and distinctive views on the subject and situated culture as a primary loci of the revolution.

In contrast, British historian Ian Thatcher believed his work featured a strong, condescending tone towards Russian workers. Thatcher had argued his writings had presented them disparagingly as uncultured, illiterate and superstitious. This interpretation has been a source of contention with American socialist David North, with the latter criticising Thatcher for presenting a “spiteful and dishonest of Trotsky’s writings on Problems of Every Day Life” .

Conservative historian Robert Service acknowledged the book to be reflective of his strengths as a writer of distinction and past associations with the artistic milieu in Russia and wider Europe. More precisely, he viewed the booklet to be reflective of his voluminous writings on a range of topics including international relations, terror, Russian history and Soviet economic development which in turn confirmed his status as “one of the outstanding Marxist thinkers”.

== See also ==
- Leon Trotsky bibliography
- List of books by Leon Trotsky
- Literature and Revolution
- Marxist cultural analysis
