= Working-class culture =

Culture and life of wage workers

Working-class culture or proletarian culture is a range of cultures created by or popular among working-class people. The cultures can be contrasted with high culture and folk culture, and are often equated with popular culture and low culture (the counterpart of high culture). Working-class culture developed during the Industrial Revolution. Because most of the newly created working class were former peasants, the cultures took on much of the localised folk culture. This was soon altered by the changed conditions of social relationships and the increased mobility of the workforce and later by the marketing of mass-produced cultural artefacts such as prints and ornaments and commercial entertainment such as music hall and cinema.

In academia, working-class socio-economic circumstances are conventionally associated with smoking, alcoholism, domestic abuse, obesity and delinquency.

== Politics of working-class culture ==
=== Socialism ===
Many socialists with a class struggle viewpoint see working-class culture as a vital element of the proletariat which they champion. One of the first organisations for proletarian culture was Proletkult, founded in Russia shortly after the February Revolution, supported by Alexander Bogdanov, who had been co-leader of the Bolsheviks with Vladimir Lenin. The group included both Bolsheviks and their critics, and Bogdanov struggled to retain its independence following the Bolshevik Revolution in October 1917. His erstwhile ally Anatoly Lunacharsky had rejoined the Bolsheviks and was appointed Commissar for Education.

In Literature and Revolution, Trotsky examined aesthetic issues in relation to class and the Russian revolution. Soviet scholar Robert Bird considered his work as the "first systematic treatment of art by a Communist leader" and a catalyst for later, Marxist cultural and critical theories. Trotsky presented a critique of contemporary literary movements such as Futurism and emphasised a need of cultural autonomy for the development of a socialist culture. According to literary critic Terry Eagleton, Trotsky recognised “like Lenin on the need for a socialist culture to absorb the finest products of bourgeois art”. Trotsky himself viewed the proletarian culture as “temporary and transitional” which would provide the foundations for a culture above classes. He also argued that the pre-conditions for artistic creativity were economic well-being and emancipation from material constraints. Political scientist Baruch Knei-Paz characterised his view on the role of the party as transmitters of culture to the masses and raising the standards of education, as well as entry into the cultural sphere, but that the process of artistic creation in terms of language and presentation should be the domain of the practitioner. Knei-Paz also noted key distinctions between Trotsky’s approach on cultural matters and Stalin's policy in the 1930s.

Marxist–Leninist states have declared an official working-class culture, most notably socialist realism, whose constant aim is to glorify the worker, in contrast to typical independent working-class cultures. However, Lenin believed that there could be no authentic proletarian culture free from capitalism and that high culture should be brought to the workers.

The millenarian nature of socialist working-class art is evident in the goals espoused by the leaders of revolutionary movements. The art forms for the masses were meant to shape a new consciousness and form the basis of a new culture and new man.

=== Working-class culture and the American Dream ===
Many Americans believe the U.S. is a "Land of Opportunity" that offers every child an equal chance at social and economic mobility. The idea of Americans rising from humble origins to riches has been called a "civil religion", "the bedrock upon which the American story has been anchored", and part of the American identity (the American Dream) This theme is celebrated in the lives of famous Americans such as Benjamin Franklin and Henry Ford, and in popular culture (from the books of Horatio Alger and Norman Vincent Peale to the song "Movin' on Up").

== See also ==
- Blue collar
- Culture of poverty
- Industrial novel
- Kitchen sink realism
- Labor history
- Proletkult
- Proletarian literature
- Proletarian poetry
- The Making of the English Working Class – 1963 history book by E. P. Thompson
