= Trotsky's Military Writings =

1969 posthumous book by Leon Trotsky

Leon Trotsky's Military Writings
- Author: Leon Trotsky
- Original title: Leon Trotsky's Military Writings
- Translator: George Breitman (English)
- Language: Russian
- Genre: Nonfiction
- Publisher: Pathfinder Books (America)
- Publication date: 1923–25, 1969, 2018
- Publication place: Soviet Union
- Media type: Print

Trotsky's Military Writings are a voluminous compilation of articles, essays and lectures on military theory by Russian revolutionary, Leon Trotsky during the course of the Russian Civil War with the formation of the Red Army.

In his writings, Trotsky notably expressed his views that military doctrine was an art rather than an empirical science. He also opposed attempts among Soviet figures during this period to transfer pre-conceived, Marxist concepts to the theatre of war. Rather, he instead emphasised a reliance on experiential experience to develop military methods of adaptation and proficiency.

== Writing background ==
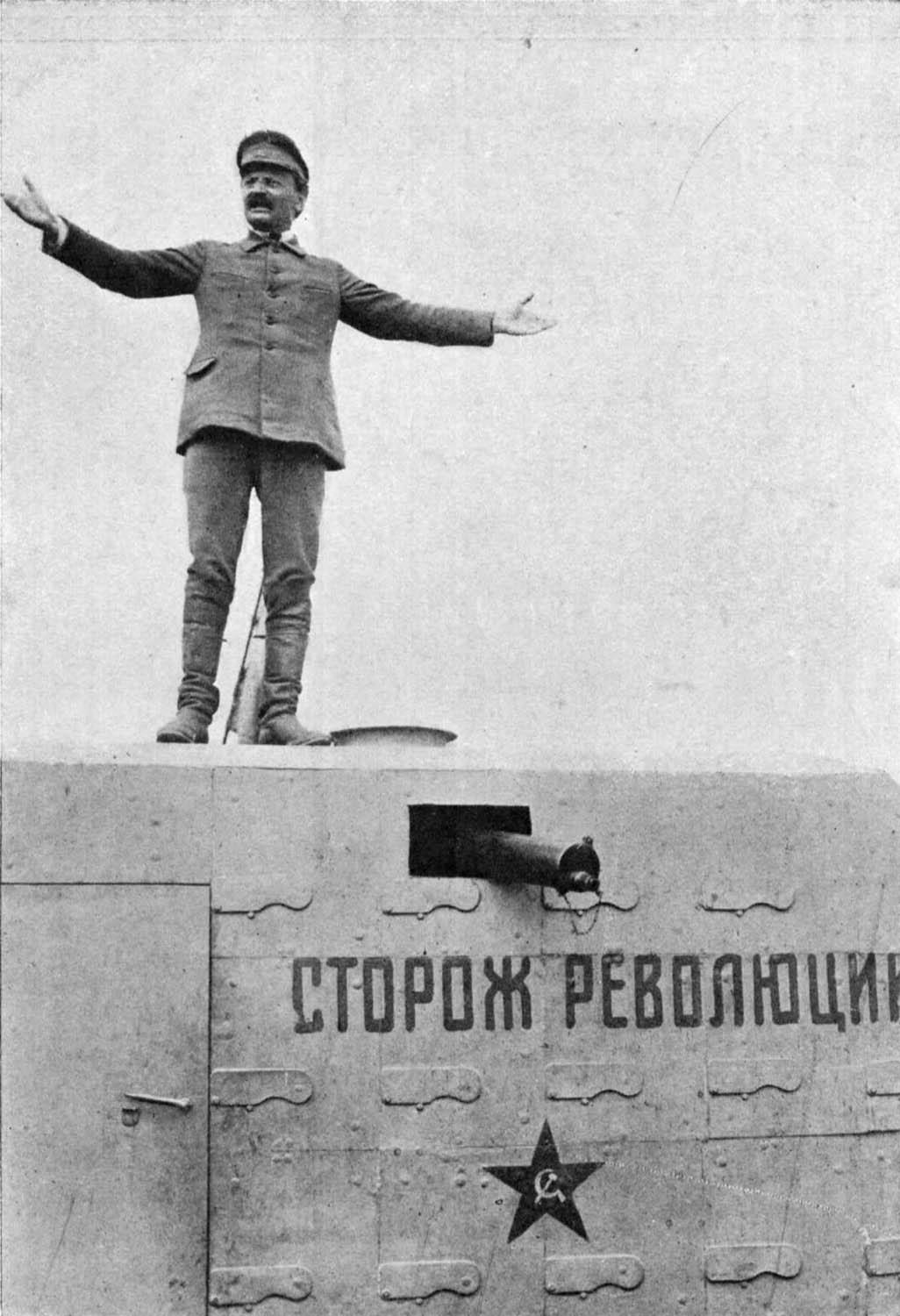
Trotsky speaks from his armored train in 1920

Trotsky had been appointed as the Commissar of War, leader of the Supreme Military Council and eventually the Revolutionary Military Committee without any previous, formal military training. He had been most influenced by the works of Prussian general Carl Von Clausewitz in his approach towards military affairs. Contemporary Bolshevik, Karl Radek, relates that Trotsky had read only a few books on military affairs such as Jean Jaurès L'Armée Nouvelle, the History of War by Friedrich Wilhelm Schulz and Franz Mehring's writings on Frederick the Great. However, his biographer, Isaac Deutscher, believed Radek undervalued Trotsky's level of theoretical comprehension and cited his previous studies on the Balkan Wars and the first years of the World War I.

Trotsky had viewed war as a historical expression of the class struggle and did not negate the possibility that under specific circumstances that a civil war would ensue after a revolutionary insurrection as seen during the English Civil War and French Civil War.

Originally, he had envisioned the Red Army to be founded on the principle of a people's militia but eventually adhered to the establishment of a professional standing army due to the immediate pressures of the Civil War. Trotsky believed the democratisation of the army would emerge in the future with the modernization of Russia's socio-economic structure in which mass education, high cultural standards and collective consciousness had manifested.

In the context of the Civil War, Trotsky prioritised a professional army based on rules of hierarchy and command. He favoured the influx of military specialists from the Tsarist era and oversaw the precedence of an appointments system over the election of commanders. Simultaneously, Trotsky constructed a political commissar system in the army as part of his initiatives for military reorganisation. The social structure of the Red Army was shaped by an collectivist ethos which distinguished it from traditional armies of the past as officers were increasingly drawn from peasants and workers in the pursuit of egalitarian principles. Trotsky would introduce his proposals through his "Theses" to the eighth party congress in March 1919 which were adopted and endorsed in the ninth party congress but generated significant levels of criticisms from figures such as General Alexander Svechin.

Trotsky had formulated his writings whilst travelling in his mobile, armoured train between conflict fronts and delivered a number of lectures at the Scientific Military Society and to military delegates at the Communist Party. In the latter speech, he elaborated his views in relation to the historical lessons of the Civil War, transferability of these military experiences to other worker's movement and the compatibility of a military doctrine with class analysis.

== Content ==
His original writings focused on the nature of military and administrative challenges facing the first socialist state were published in three volumes, How the Revolution Armed Itself, between 1923 and 1925.

The condensed re-publication of his military writings in 1969 derived from the Volume III of his military writings with four chapters reviewing "Military-Technical Problems". The first chapter examined "Unified Military Doctrine" in a speech delivered to the Scientific Military Society in 1921. The following second chapter is an extract from a pamphlet on "Military Doctrine or Pseudo Military Doctrinarism" completed in 1921. The third chapter "Our Current Basic Military Tasks" featured a report and summary speech delivered to a conference of military delegates in 1922, the fourth chapter examined "Marxism and Military Knowledge" that consisted of a summary speech delivered in 1922 and his fifth chapter examined "Marxism and Military Warfare" that is based on his review of book written by Frederick Engels.

Two additional appendixes are included in the 1969 publication which derived from a letter written in 1919 and a chapter from his book on New Course published in 1923 for which he expressed his growing concerns on the growth of bureaucratism in the army and party.

== Historical evaluation ==
Bolshevik opinion on Trotsky's methods varied whilst Vladimir Lenin held his approach in high regard, his efforts faced strong opposition from figures such as Georgy Pyatakov, Kliment Voroshilov and Joseph Stalin across the party. U.S. Army Brigadier General Harold W. Nelson noted the reliability of the compilations and the historical significance of his military writings as a principal account that examined the party's history in relation to military questions.

Davy Jones, military lecturer and associate at the American Naval War College Department of Advanced Research surveyed the development of his military thought from pre-1917 writings until the Civil War. He commented that his military thought prior to 1917 as expressed in his book, 1905, had received limited scholarly attention and these ideas would come to a "impressive fruition" during the 1918-1920 civil war. However, Jones concluded that Trotsky's interim methods were increasingly at odds with his socialist principles, in part due to the unconducive conditions of the Civil War. Jones made a further observation on the latter’s role in the construction of a new state which rather than embodying liberating principles such as Trotsky’s long-term aspiration of a people's militia seemed to resemble another instrument of oppression.

== See also ==
- List of books by Leon Trotsky
- Russian Civil War
- Anti-Stalinist left
