= The Spanish Revolution, 1931–1939 (Trotsky book) =

1973 posthumous book by Leon Trotsky

- Author: Leon Trotsky
- Original title: Trotsky and the Spanish Revolution
- Translator: George Breitman and Naomi Allen (English)
- Language: Russian
- Genre: Nonfiction
- Publisher: Pathfinder Books (America)
- Publication date: 1973
- Publication place: Soviet Union
- Media type: Print

The Spanish Revolution, 1931–1939 is a collection of Leon Trotsky's writings about the Spanish Civil War.

Throughout this period, Trotsky asserted there was an urgent need for a mass revolutionary party, sharply criticised the conciliatory actions of the POUM faction such as abandoning the Left Opposition program, the intrigues of the Stalinist Comintern in suppressing the left-wing forces and facilitating the ascent of fascist Spain.

In his observations and analysis, Trotsky proposed a number of actions including the temporary entry of sections of the International Left Opposition into the Socialist parties, united front with left-wing parties including the CNT and anarchist groups along with the formation of workers councils.

== Writing background ==
Following his exile from the Soviet Union, Trotsky had continued political activity and involvement with the international revolutionary movement. In early 1931, Trotsky had warned the Politburo that the outcome of the Spanish Revolution would be dependent on the Spanish Communist Party and the pending failure would result in the initiation of a fascist dictatorship reminiscent of the Mussolini regime. In his article "The Spanish Revolution and the Dangers Threatening It", Trotsky had forewarned that the Comintern was adopting an erroneous policy which conformed to a stagist, neutral and collaborationist stance towards the Spanish question. He drew parallels between this policy and the popular front alliance that Stalin had previously pursued in relation to China and the bourgeoisie Kuomintang dictatorship. However, his pleas were rejected by the Comintern, under the direction of Stalin, who had demanded the destruction of Trotsky and Trotskyists.

Correspondingly, Trotsky and his followers abandoned any notion of rehabilitating the Communist International after the rise of the Nazi Germany and the diplomatic intrigues of the Stalinist-dominated Comintern. Instead, Trotsky called for the formation of a new international and new parties which defined his attitude towards Spain. In this period, the primary organisations of the left consisted of anarchists, trade unionists, socialists, Comintern-allied communists and the Trotskyist Left Opposition.

== Content ==
The flag colours of the Trotskyist-influenced POUM faction

Trotsky elucidated a number of organisational and programmatic challenges facing the Spanish Left Opposition in tandem with the Republican factions. In his writings, heavy emphasis and urgency is placed on the need for a mass, revolutionary political party premised on the Leninist model.

In 1931, Trotsky wrote a pamphlet on the Spanish Revolution and called for the creation of worker’s juntas in emulation of elected soviets as an expression of working class organisation. Trotsky stipulated the need for shared participation of the communist factions, anarcho-syndicalists and socialists.

“Precisely towards this end do we propose to create soviets. Worker’s representatives, belong to different parties, will discuss within these soviets all the timely questions and all the immediate tasks. The worker’s soviet is the healthiest, most natural, most open, and most honest form of this alliance for common work.”

— Trotsky, Ten Commandments of the Spanish Communist, 1931

The first half of the book draws particular attention to the newly focused Spanish section of the International Left Opposition. In the latter half of his writings, Trotsky issued polemical criticisms of sectarian elements, the placatory decisions of Andreu Nin and the reformist programs of the non-revolutionary organisations. Pressingly, he issued a pamphlet "The Lessons of Spain - The Last Warning" in 1937 summarising his views on the Spanish Revolution and the machinations of Stalin.

A day prior to his assassination, Trotsky had produced an article on August 20 1940 which viewed the role of class, party and leadership calibre as the determinant, factors that inexorably ensured the defeat of the Spanish Republic.

== Historical evaluation and reception ==
Trotsky's political theory and conception of historical development had a considerable influence on Spanish dissident communists from 1930 until 1937. In the view of historian Alan Sennett, his writings shaped their political critique of Stalinism and comprehension of fascism. Senett further argued that this volume of Trotsky's writings had received negligible attention from recent biographers such as Robert Service, Geoffrey Swain and Ian Thatcher whilst French Trotskyist historian Pierre Broue has engaged with this specific literature more vigorously.

In contrast, Left Oppositionist and anarchist, Victor Serge, directed criticism at Trotsky’s writings on the Spanish Civil War including his harsh denouncement of the tactical errors of POUM as “treason” and perceived sectarianism. Serge argued his ideological inflexibility on this matter and personal traits had weakened his influence among the international socialist left. Comparatively, political scientist James Martin believed that Trotsky's writings exhibited a prescient analysis and a strong accuracy of military affairs which was vindicated by the Spanish Civil War. Trotsky’s criticisms of Stalin's role and the Comintern during the Spanish revolution has also received support from British historian E.H. Carr.

== See also ==
- List of books by Leon Trotsky
- Spanish Revolution of 1936
- POUM
- Left Opposition
- Revolutionary Catalonia
- May Days
- Fourth International
