= Bogatyrka =

Bogatyrka may refer to:

- A female bogatyr, a Russian folk hero
- An earlier name of Russian military hat budenovka
