= Towards Socialism or Capitalism? =

1925 pamphlet by Leon Trotsky

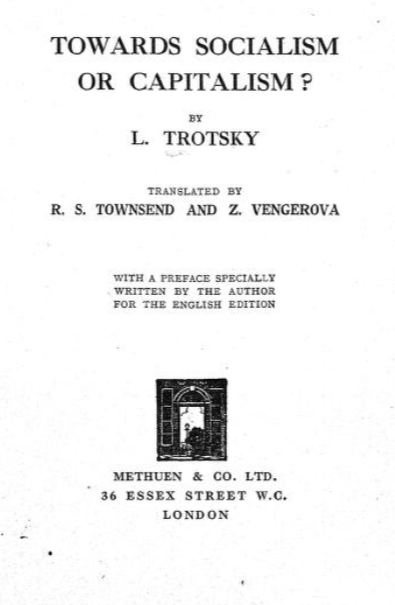
- Title page for Towards Socialism or Capitalism? (1926)
- Author: Leon Trotsky
- Original title: Whither Russia? Towards Socialism or Capitalism?
- Translator: R.S. Townsend and Z. Vengerova
- Language: Russian
- Genre: Nonfiction
- Publisher: Penguin Books (England)
- Publication date: 1925
- Publication place: Soviet Union
- Media type: Print

Towards Socialism or Capitalism? is a 1925 economic pamphlet produced by Leon Trotsky which reviewed the industrial development of Soviet Union following the adoption of the New Economic Policy. Trotsky centred his analysis on the statistical figures assembled by GOSPLAN on industrial output. The book examined the prospects for fulfilling industrial targets, socialisation of agriculture and potential dangers facing economic reconstruction such as the political tensions emanating from social stratification.

== Historical background ==
Trotsky had written the book amidst Lenin's death and the succession struggle in 1924. Several factions had begun to coalesce themselves around differing economic positions which precipitated the "Great debate" from 1924 until 1928.

In opposition to Nikolai Bukharin and the Rightist faction, Trotsky had allied himself with members of the Left Opposition such as Yevgeni Preobrazhensky who was the main economic theoretician and formulated the concept of "primitive socialist accumulation". The Left Opposition advocated for state-led industrialization driven by a supply flow of capital which derived from agricultural taxation. Consequently, this would culminate in Trotsky developing his economic thinking with his pamphlet on Toward Socialism or Capitalism?

== Modern interpretations ==
The book has prompted a spectrum of interpretations on Trotsky's political and economic alignment during the 1920s party debates. Historian E. H. Carr viewed the work to be consistent with his political inclinations towards progressive industrialization and electrification as seen with his active support for the Dnieprostroi dam which was a source of contention with the more reticent Stalin. Contrarily, historian Geoffrey Swain claimed that Trotsky had consciously associated himself with the Stalinist project of building socialism in one country.

On the other hand, Marxist theoretician David North believed this view misrepresented the actual position of Trotsky. Rather, he was of the view that Trotsky had instead argued that the long-term survival of world capitalism presented the prospect of building socialism in one country with a number of "great dangers". Political scientist Erik Van Ree asserted that Trotsky was ambiguous on the prospect of building socialism in one country.

Biographer Ian Thatcher stated the book outlined the possible paths of development available to the USSR. Thatcher further insisted that Trotsky sought to present several advantages of socialist economic management which would facilitate a faster rate of growth than was permissible under Western free-market conditions. Political scientist, Baruch Knei-Paz alluded to the pamphlet as textual evidence which delineated an area of difference between Trotsky and Stalin in terms of their economic outlook, with the former advocating for extensive commercial relations with European countries rather than autarkic isolationism.

== See also ==
- List of books by Leon Trotsky
- Left Opposition
- United Opposition
- Economic planning
- International trade
- Industrialization in the Soviet Union
- New Economic Policy
- Mechanised agriculture
- Socialism
- Socialist economics
