= The Struggle Against Fascism in Germany =

1971 posthumous book by Leon Trotsky

- Author: Leon Trotsky
- Original title: The Struggle Against Fascism in Germany
- Translator: George Breitman and Merry Maisel (English)
- Language: Russian
- Genre: Nonfiction
- Publisher: Pathfinder Books (America)
- Publication date: 1971
- Publication place: Soviet Union
- Media type: Print

The Struggle Against Fascism in Germany or Fascism: What It Is and How To Fight It is a 1971 compilation book based on the writings of Russian revolutionary, Leon Trotsky on the origin of fascism; his early warnings on Nazi Germany, his views on the Comintern, and his tactical support for a united front.

== Historical background ==
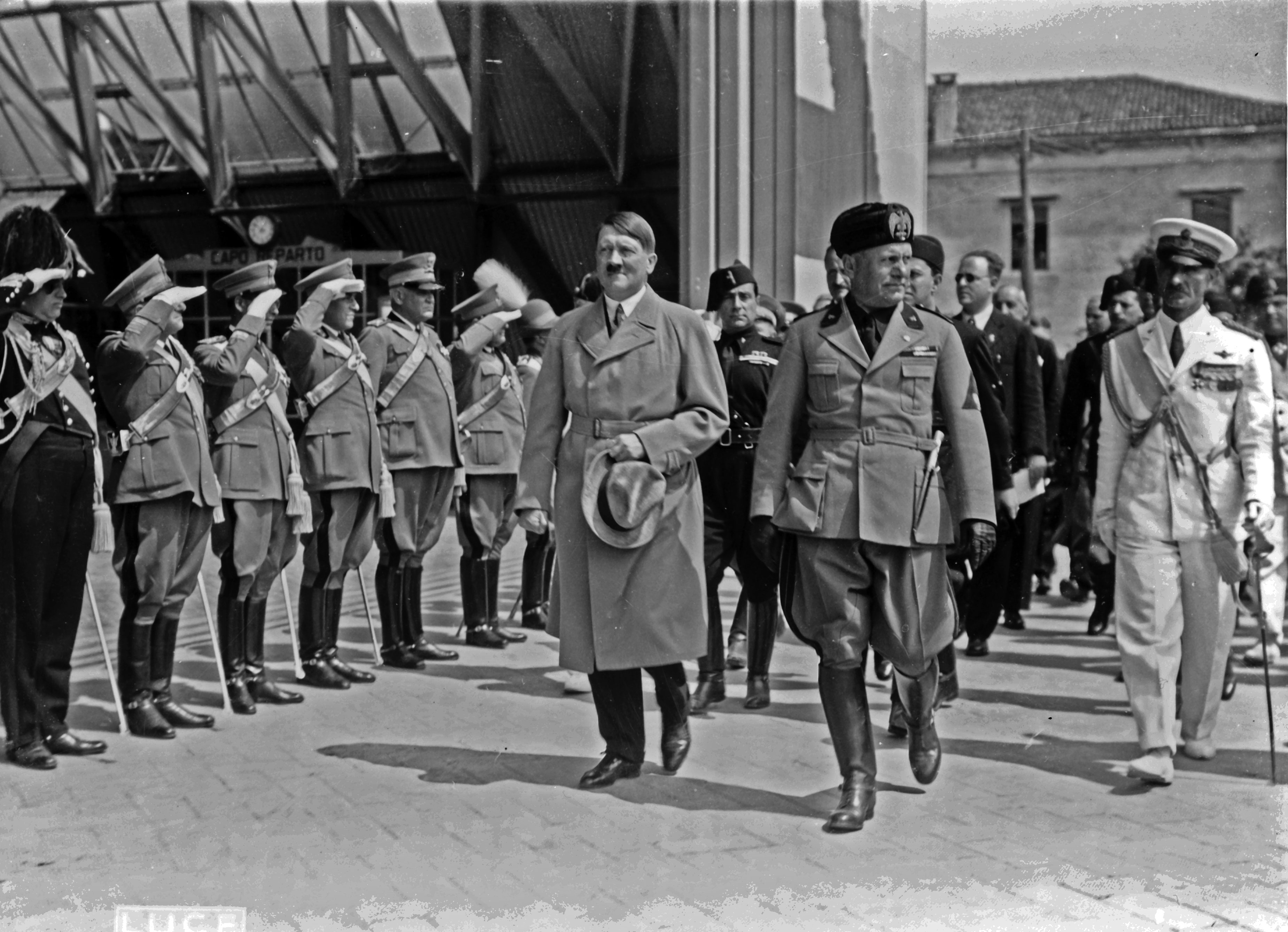
Fascist leaders Hitler and Mussolini in 1934

From the onset of the 1920s and 1930s, fascist movements had manifested across continental Europe but reached political maturation in Italy, Germany and Spain. In exile, Trotsky had still adhered to the view that Germany would be the principal terrain for world revolution.

In June 1928, the Comintern had decided that the "decay" of capitalism had entered into a "third period" and this would result in an escalation of class conflict and consequently opposition to the social democratic parties. The social democratic parties were interpreted to be "social fascist" and hence judged to represent the same level of danger as the nascent, fascist parties. According to Trotsky, the Communist Party of Germany underestimated Hitler when they argued that believed he could easily be removed from power in the likelihood of his electoral success.

Socialist construction in the U.S.S.R., the course of the Spanish revolution, the development of the pre-revolutionary situation in England, the future of French imperialism, the fate of the revolutionary movement in China and India - all this directly and immediately rests upon the question of who will be victorious in Germany...Communism or Fascism?

— Trotsky on the prospects of world revolution, 1931.

Trotsky had strongly criticised this position as early as 1929. In March 1930, before the crucial German elections, he had issued an "Open Letter" to the All-Union Communist Party (Bolsheviks) about the increasing threat of fascism across Europe and the exigent need for a joint Socialist-Communist action. Trotsky would continue to issue further warnings, during the crucial years preceding 1933, that the rise of the Nazi Party could be only obstructed with the correct tactics and organisations. In his theoretical conception of fascism, Trotsky categorised fascism as the primary threat to the working-class movement due to its social roots which marked the ideology as a urgent rather than transitory danger.

Tactically, Trotsky believed it was inconceivable that the Communist movement could defeat Social Democracy and Fascism at the same time. Rather, he believed that a united front in the form of a tactical alliance with Social Democrats could negate the threat of Fascism. His biographer, Isaac Deutscher described the united front as a joint pact of action between two parties but without any shared ideological accommodation.

On the other hand, Trotsky maintained in 1931 that the rise of the fascism in Germany would be disastrous for the German Communist movement and "signify an inevitable war against the U.S.S.R." Trotsky viewed Stalin along with the Soviet bureaucracy, above all, to have a particularly ruinous and accentuating influence in countering fascism. According to Russian historian, Sergei Kudriashov, Trotsky believed this was evident through the purges of the Old Bolsheviks, military commanders and transfer of material supplies to Germany with the Soviet-German pact. Trotsky also considered Stalin's foreign policy to be an expression of the latter's political cynicism in that "in his alliance with Hitler and on Hitler's initiative Stalin decided to take "guarantees against Hitler".

Trotsky argued that Stalinism and fascism were distinct, institutional systems but the political methods of Stalin and Hitler had strong similarities. In his view, the Stalinist bureaucracy was compelled to enact some progressive measures to preserve its position in a worker's state whereas fascism was premised on the maintenance of private property.

== Theoretical conception of fascism ==
According to political scientist Baruch Knei-Paz, Trotsky had construed fascism as a political system which emerged during the "decline of capitalism". In this interpretation, Trotsky viewed bourgeoisie democracy as alternating between a peaceful, reformist incarnation and more overtly coercive, dictatorial stages during periods of disintegration.

Fascism arose amidst the economic and political turbulence of the latter stages in which the big bourgeoisie secured an alliance with the petty bourgeoise in confrontation with the proletariat. The main base of fascism derived from a disaffected petty bourgeoisie with big bourgeois reserving economic power.

The defining element in Trotsky's theoretical framework was that the fascist government sought the liquidation of the proletariat as a social force and this was a primary motive for all totalitarian measures including homogeneity, racism, nationalism and cultural regimentation. Trotsky identified the Bonapartist tendency of Nazism as an underlying and fatal weakness. In other words, as the political state increasingly relied on terror and became ever more detached from economic considerations, this would in turn correlate with an increasing inability to reconcile social problems.

Trotskyist economist Ernest Mandel described Trotsky's conception of fascism as an amalgamation of six components in unity. This included a severe social crisis of late capitalism, the existence of bourgeois parliamentary democracy, the disruption of social-economic forces, the liquidation of the worker's movement, the disaffection of the petite bourgeoisie, and the historic fulfilment in meeting the interests of monopoly capital.

== Summary ==
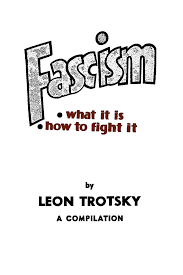
Leon Trotsky's original pamphlet "Fascism: What it is and how to fight it" argued for the tactical method of a united front to counter the rise of Nazi Germany

The collected writings chronicled Trotsky's commentaries from 1930 onwards in which he signalled alarm to the deteriorating situation in Germany. He then continued to deliver strong criticism of German Communist leader Ernst Thälmann, the vacillating strategy of the Comintern over "national communism" and their support for the Nazi referendum "Red Plebiscite". He also examined the preparatory work along with the practical need for worker's control of production as a dual power in Germany and a policy platform of the Left Opposition.

In 1931, Trotsky writings elaborated on the concept of united front as an organisational strategy and the eventual aftermath of the Red Referendum. He would attribute this failed venture to the nationalist orientation of the Stalinist bureaucracy which erroneously appropriated the language of patriotism to outflank Nazism in mass appeal. Trotsky also cited empirical data to compare unfavourably the stagnant growth of the German Communist Party with the virulence of the Nazi Party and other parties in the German Reichstag.

His later writings on Germany from 1932 until 1940, reviewed and increasingly concentrated focus on the defeat of the labour movement along with the Bonapartist elements in the German context. Trotsky associated this tendency with figures such as Hindenburg and von Papen that used the coercive military as well as the police apparatus to maintain social equilibrium. In his final writings, Trotsky analysed the nature of the newly emergent fascist strain. Principally, he argued that it was distinct phenomena from Bonapartism due to the alliance between big bourgeoisie, financial capital and the petty bourgeoisie to fundamentally resolve conflicting social classes.

== Historical evaluation ==
A number of scholars including Robert S. Wistrich, E.H. Carr, Sergei Kudriashov, Alec Nove, Samuel Kassow along with Ernest Mandel have lauded Trotsky's writings on fascism with particular emphasis on the prescience of his writings, conceptual clarity and enduring value of his social analysis.

Kudriashov noted that Trotsky made a series of accurate and forewarning prognoses in relation to this subject matter. He cited his correct forecast of the Soviet-German pact, shared economic agreement, the shifting position of the Comintern, Stalin's policy towards Eastern Europe and the inevitability of war between Germany and the USSR. Nevertheless, he concluded that Trotsky was mistakenly self-assured that World War II would lead to the terminal collapse of capitalism and advance revolutionary socialism in most nation states. He further added that Trotsky underestimated the strength and tractability of Stalinism which, far from collapsing during the war as Trotsky expected, had found its own prestige amplified after defeating fascist Germany.

In the view of Deutscher, his exposition and underlying analysis of Germany "written between 1930 and 1933, the years before Hitler's assumption of power, stand out as a cool, clinical analysis and forecast of this stupendous phenomenon of social psychopathology and its consequences to the international labour movement, to the Soviet Union, and to the world". His theoretical conception of fascism has also been viewed more favourably than other contending, Marxist and social democratic interpretations of fascism.

On the other hand, political scientist Baruch Knez-Paz retained some criticism that Trotsky's analysis was derivative of the Marxist theoretical framework and hence limited by an "exaggerated imposition" of this approach towards the German context. He further denoted that Trotsky overplayed the role of the big capital and neglected the autonomous role of Hitler in exerting political authority irrespective of specific financial interests through his formation of independent political entities such as the party, bureaucracy and secret police apparatus.

== See also ==
- List of books by Leon Trotsky
- Adolf Hitler's rise to power
- Fascism
- Anti-Fascism
- Anti-Stalinist left
