= Our Political Tasks =

1904 pamphlet by Leon Trotsky

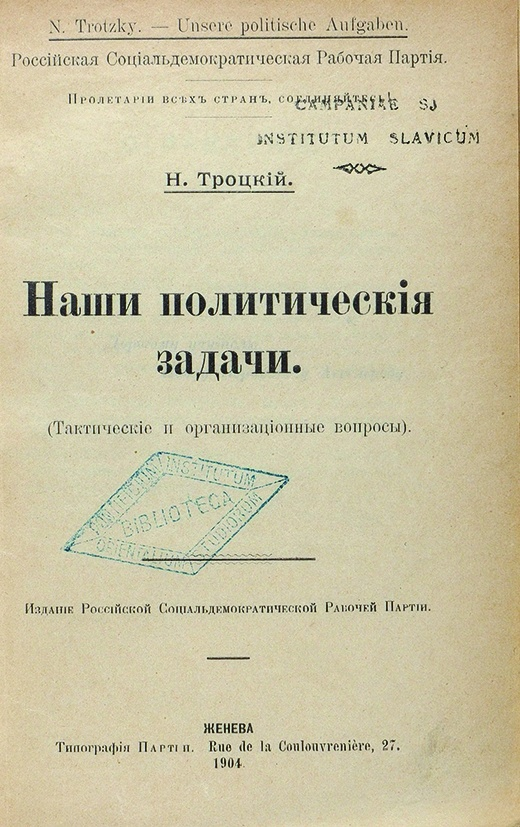
- Cover of 1904 edition
- Author: Leon Trotsky
- Original title: Наши политические задачи
- Language: Russian
- Publication date: 1904
- Publication place: Russia
- Media type: Pamphlet

Our Political Tasks (Russian: Наши политические задачи) is a pamphlet by Leon Trotsky, published in 1904 as a response to the book of Vladimir Lenin "One Step Forward, Two Steps Back". It is the first relatively large work of the author; the book was aimed against the RSDLP party split, in which Lenin was accused.

== Literature ==
- Knei-Paz B. The Social and Political Thought of Leon Trotsky. — 1st. — Oxford University Press, 1978. — 652 p. — ISBN 9780198272335. — ISBN 0198272340.
- Carlo A. Trotsky and the Party: From Our Political Tasks to the October Revolution // The Ideas of Leon Trotsky / eds. Hillel Ticktin, Michael Cox. — Porcupine Press, 1995. — 386 p. — ISBN 9781899438044. — ISBN 1899438041.
- Saccarelli E. Gramsci and Trotsky in the Shadow of Stalinism: The Political Theory and Practice of Opposition. — Routledge, 2008. — 320 p. — ISBN 9781135899806. — ISBN 1135899800.
