= Literature and Revolution =

Book by Leon Trotsky

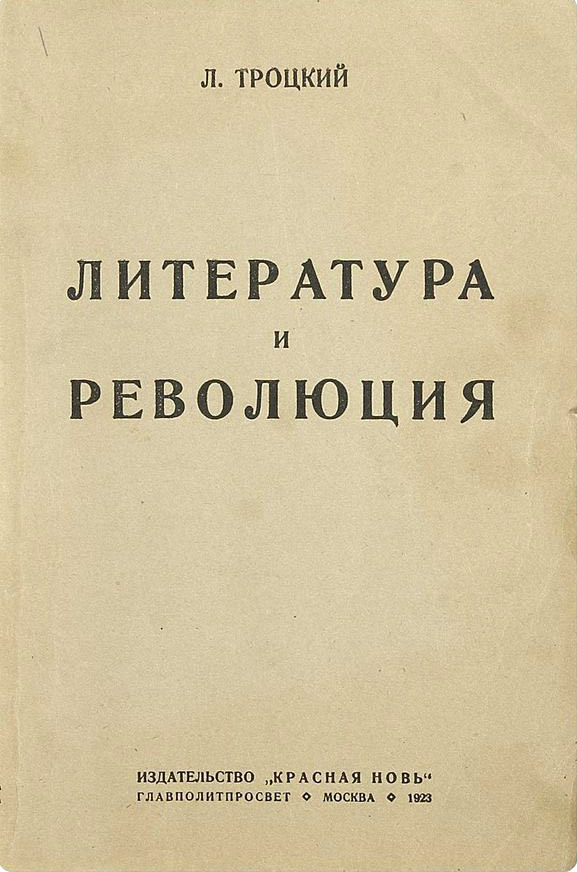
Cover of Literature and Revolution

Literature and Revolution (Russian: Литература и революция) is a work of literary criticism from the Marxist standpoint written by Leon Trotsky in 1924. By discussing the various literary trends that were around in Russia between the revolutions of 1905 and 1917, Trotsky analyzed the concrete forces in society, both progressive as well as reactionary, that helped shape the consciousness of writers at the time.

In the book, Trotsky also argued that since the dawn of civilization, art had always borne the stamp of the ruling class and was primarily a vehicle that expressed its tastes and sensibilities. Nonetheless, he went on to argue against the seemingly obvious conclusion that after a proletarian revolution, the proletariat as a ruling class should, therefore, strive to create its own proletarian art.

To illustrate this, he points out that the bourgeoisie as a class had time and resources to form its culture long before the bourgeois revolutions in Europe in the 19th century, while the proletariat, by its position in society, is deprived not only of culture but primarily of the material means to attain it. Therefore, unlike previous revolutions in history, the proletariat takes power not to install itself as a ruling class forever and hence create its own distinct culture but to create a society in which the existence of classes is materially impossible. Therefore, the task of the proletariat in power with respect to art after seeing to the more pressing needs of daily life (one must not forget Russia was a war-torn country) is to assimilate all the cultural achievements of the past and lay the foundations for a truly classless and human culture and art in the future. Trotsky's conviction of the heights human beings can reach once the fetters of oppression are thrown asunder is illustrated by the following quote from the book:

It is difficult to predict the extent of self-government which the man of the future may reach or the heights to which he may carry his technique. Social construction and psycho-physical self-education will become two aspects of one and the same process. All the arts – literature, drama, painting, music and architecture will lend this process beautiful form. More correctly, the shell in which the cultural construction and self-education of Communist man will be enclosed, will develop all the vital elements of contemporary art to the highest point. Man will become immeasurably stronger, wiser and subtler; his body will become more harmonized, his movements more rhythmic, his voice more musical. The forms of life will become dynamically dramatic. The average human type will rise to the heights of an Aristotle, a Goethe, or a Marx. And above this ridge new peaks will rise.

== Scholarly evaluation ==
In a comprehensive survey of Trotsky’s political thought, political scientist Baruch Knei-Paz argued that Trotsky’s writings on cultural matters as evident in Literature and Revolution "were undoubtedly amongst the most informed and enlightened within the Bolshevik leadership". Yet, Knei-Paz added that an underlying limitation of Trotsky’s analysis was that he premised the overall legitimacy of art on the basis of political criteria.

== See also ==
- List of books by Leon Trotsky
- Problems of Everyday Life - Trotsky's 1924-25 writings on culture, science and education.
