= Trotsky's train =

Leon Trotsky's armored train in the Russian Civil War

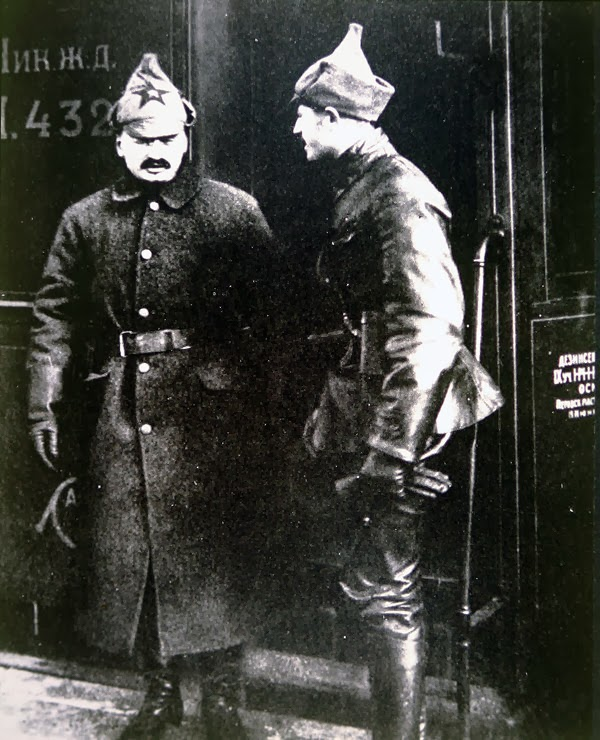
Leon Trotsky (left) and the train at Petrograd, 1921. The commander on the right is wearing the train's special uniform, made entirely of red leather.

During the Russian Civil War (1917–1922), Leon Trotsky, the Soviet People's Commissar of Defense from 1918 to 1925, used an armored train to travel between Red Army fronts and as a mobile command and propaganda center. In the course of the civil war, the train made 36 such trips to the fronts and traveled at least 75,000 miles (121,000 km). The train was in action against White and other anti-Bolshevik forces on 13 occasions during the civil war and suffered 15 casualties (with an additional 15 missing), and was itself awarded the Order of the Red Banner for its part in deflecting the advance on Petrograd by White general Nikolai Yudenich in October 1919.

Trotsky's train, which he simply referred to as "the train" and officially named the "Train of the Chairman of the Revolutionary Military Council of the Republic" (Russian: Поезд председателя Реввоенсовета Республики), was first formed in Moscow on 7 August 1918. It then consisted of 2 armored engines and 12 wagons, and was dispatched for Sviyazhsk on the Volga Front with a unit of Latvian Riflemen on board. By late 1919, the train's configuration had evolved to include several armored wagons (with turrets and embrasures for machine guns and cannons), flatbed cars for transporting armored cars and other vehicles (including Trotsky's command car, a Rolls-Royce commandeered from Tsar Nicholas II's garage), a telegraph station, a radio station, an electricity-generating wagon, a printing house (with presses), a library, a secretariat wagon, a kitchen, a bathhouse wagon, and even a special wagon with a small collapsible aircraft. A newspaper, En Route, was published on board.

The train carried a special guard unit of some 100 elite troops (mostly Latvians) who dressed in special red leather uniforms and budenovka hats. Also on board were staff including cooks, mechanics, technicians, political agitators, and secretaries. By 21 January 1921, there were a total of 407 personnel attached to the train doing 80 unique jobs. Trotsky later wrote in his memoir My Life that "The strongest cement in the new army was the ideas of the October Revolution, and the train supplied the front with this cement". The train was disbanded a few months following the conclusion of the Crimean campaign in November 1920, most likely either turned to scrap or repurposed for the Soviet Armed Forces

== See also ==
- North Korean leaders' trains
