= Leon Trotsky on China =

1976 posthumous book by Leon Trotsky

- Author: Leon Trotsky
- Original title: Leon Trotsky on China
- Translator: Les Evans, Ruseel Block and Peng Shuzhi
- Language: Russian
- Genre: Nonfiction
- Publisher: Pathfinder Press (America), Monad Press
- Publication date: 1976
- Publication place: Soviet Union
- Media type: Print

Leon Trotsky on China is a compilation of letters and articles by Russian revolutionary Leon Trotsky, from 1925 until 1940. These writings documented his views on the nature of the Chinese Communist Revolution, his warnings of Joseph Stalin's policies in relation to the Kuomintang alliance which precipitated the repression campaign against the Chinese Communists in 1927 and the Sino-Japanese war.

== Writing background ==
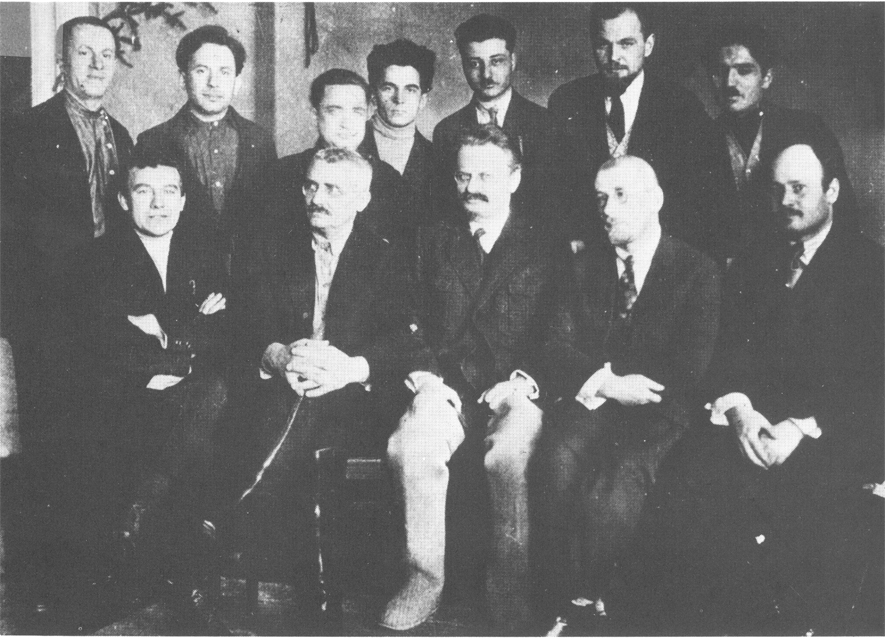
Trotsky and members of the Left Opposition in 1927, prior to their expulsion from the Soviet Union

The Bolsheviks had viewed anti-imperialist movements in the colonised regions as a major reserve for proletarian revolution alongside continental Europe. Vladimir Lenin and Trotsky had postulated that Western capitalism would be considerably weakened with the eruption of anti-colonial rebellions which in turn could suspend the supply of cheap labour, raw materials and investment inflows. In 1920, the Comintern had proclaimed the alliance between Western communists and liberation movements in the East although the exact nature of this relationship remained imprecise at this stage. From the perspective of early Chinese onlookers, Trotsky had been presented as the formal second-in command in the Soviet Union and had a significant role in the founding of the Sun Yat-sen University.

The schism between Stalin and the Trotskyist Left Opposition had ruptured in the Soviet Union in 1923 over issues related to democratisation, industrialization and foreign affairs such as relations with trade unions in Britain and the foreign Communist parties. Stalin and his faction in the CPSU and Comintern believed that the incipient Chinese revolution would follow a bourgeois-democratic model of revolution which would necessitate an alliance with bourgeois leaders.

Stain also perceived the Kuomintang as a revolutionary, progressive force because it was anti-imperialist albeit with nationalist and bourgeois composition. In his interpretation, the Kuomintang consisted of a "bloc of four classes" which included the national bourgeoisie, the petty bourgeoisie, the peasants and workers which could be directed to serve the interests of socialist revolution. Chiang Kai-Shek had been appointed an honorary member of the Executive of the Comintern prior to the Shanghai massacre, Stalin had commended his military forces as "revolutionary armies" and rejected any attempts to form soviets in China.

As early as 1924, Trotsky had strongly criticised the position of the Politburo that the Chinese Communists should subordinate their independent role to the needs of a political alliance with the Kuomintang. Rather, Trotsky insisted that the Chinese Communists form Workers and Peasants Councils with the peasantry in Southern China in opposition to Chiang Kai-shek. Stalin alongside the Politburo had censured the criticism presented by the Left Opposition with disciplinary methods and prevented the factional controversy from receiving public attention in the Soviet Union. This matter concerning the Chinese Communist Revolution remained a central issue of contention during the inner-party struggle before the final dissolution of the United Opposition.

== Content ==
Trotsky's writings on China situated the revolutionary period from 1925-1927 in the wider context of world revolution. He had made a number of warnings about the dangers associated with the Comintern policy pursued under the direction of Stalin. Trotsky rejected the view that the Kuomintang was hostile to foreign capital and instead argued that the party had allied itself with old feudal elements which had established linkages with urban capital.

In his view, Stalin's policy of bourgeois-democratic revolution imposed a mechanistic conception of revolution reminiscent of the Menshevik theory of preconceived stages. Trotsky believed this would inadvertently support the status quo and would postpone socialist revolution for an undetermined future. Contrastingly, Trotsky argued for the formation of an independent worker's party in alignment with the peasantry.

In his later writings at the end of the 1930s, he wrote on the possibilities of greater industrialization in China which would reaffirm the political principality of the Chinese working class. He would intervene in the rehabilitation of Chen Duxiu after criticisms of his ideological development and leadership from Oppositionist circles. Trotsky sought to develop a more comprehensive understanding of the Chinese economy and language through written correspondence. The wider relations between the two figures would change and subside over the course of the interwar period. Trotsky would also detail his views on the prospect of guerrilla warfare in the region and opposed the tactic of revolutionary defeatism in the Sino-Japanese War under the pretext that China was a semicolonial country engaged in an “emancipatory and progressive” struggle against Japanese colonialism.

== Reception ==
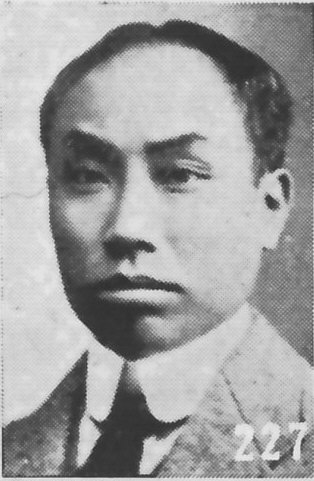
Chen Duxiu, co-founder of the Chinese Communist Party and member of the Left Opposition

His writings on China have been credited for their prescience in predicting the outcome of the Comintern's policies and also criticized for transposing the historical experience of the Russian Revolution onto China. In particular, his presumption on the primacy of the Chinese industrial proletariat over the rural peasantry in the course of social revolution.

Political scientist Baruch Knei-Paz insisted that the Chinese experience confirmed elements of Trotsky's theory of permanent revolution in the sense that a backward nation could undergo a socialist revolution before an advanced nation. Yet, he also noted that the Chinese context had demonstrated certain limitations in the applicability of his theory as seen with the occurrence of a peasant leadership.

Chinese Left Opposition leader and academic, Chen Duxiu, viewed Trotsky's writings on China approvingly along with the latter’s publication of Lenin's testament. Specifically, Dixiu regarded these commentaries as his exoneration for the initial failure of the Chinese Communist Revolution, providing the basis for compatible theoretical formulations and serving to legitimise an ideological break with Stalin.
