= New Course (Trotsky book) =

1924 brochure by Leon Trotsky

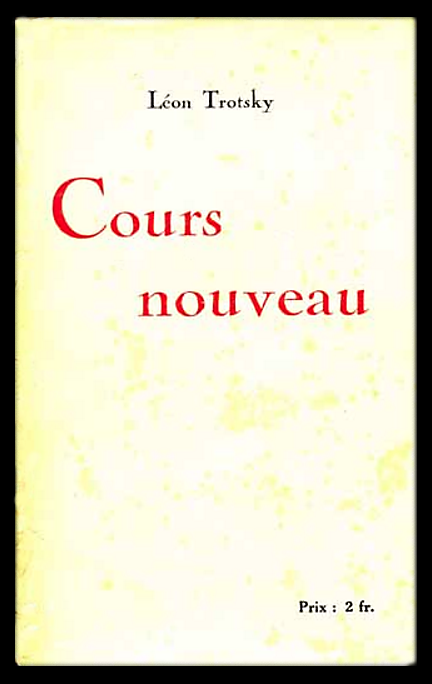
Although The New Course did not appear in English translation until 1943, it was published in a French translation by Boris Souvarine as early as 1924.

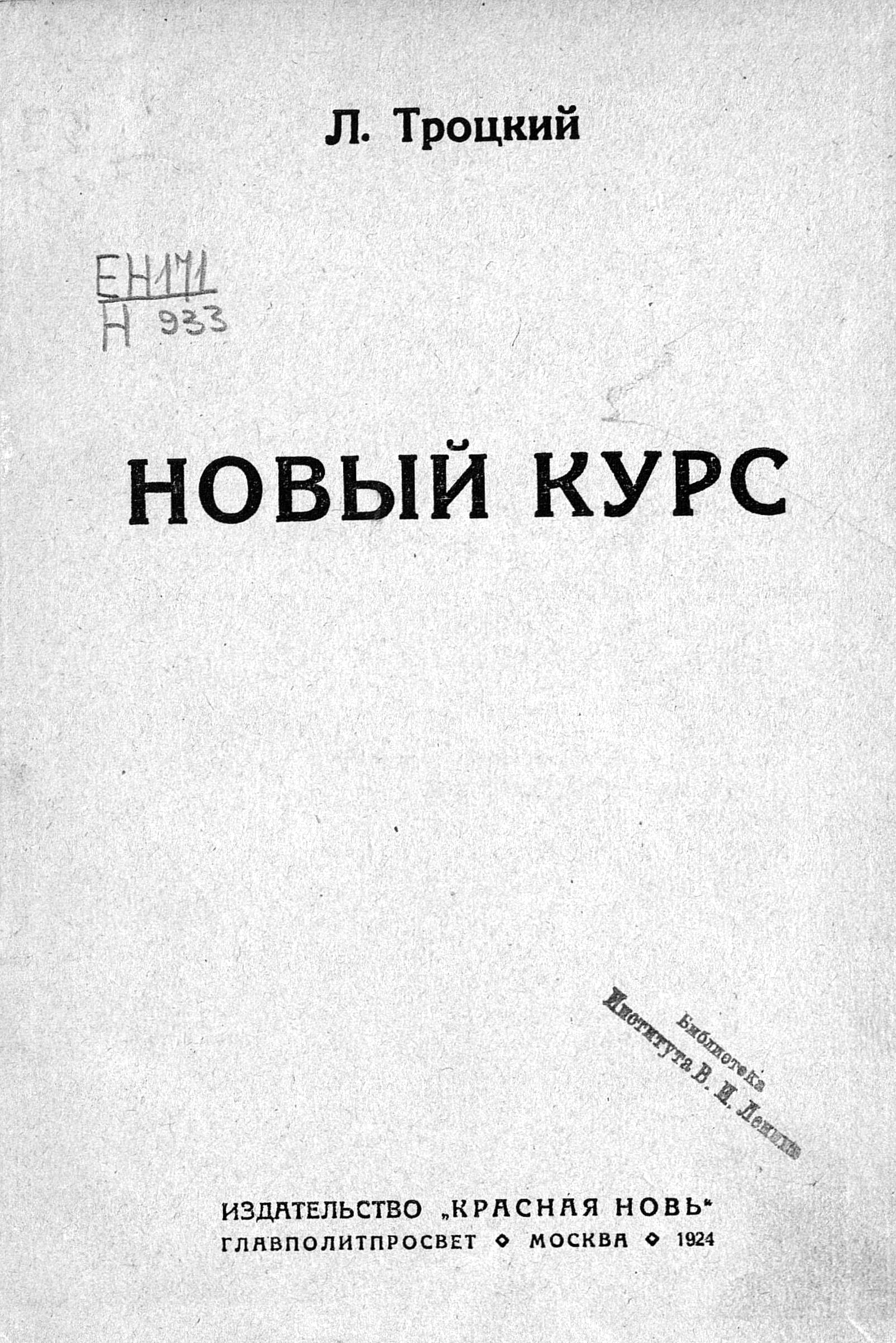
the original brochure by the "Krasnaya Nov" Publishing

The New Course (Russian: Новый курс) was a 1924 brochure by political leader Leon Trotsky. Frequently reprinted in various European and Asian language over subsequent decades, the tract is considered a first explicit statement of the Left Opposition within the ruling All-Union Communist Party (Bolsheviks) criticizing a trend towards bureaucracy and an attenuation of worker's control over the political process.

The book consisted of a collection of topical articles first published in the official Communist Party newspaper Pravda in December 1923 with additional material appended. The work was published in French and German translation as early as 1924 but did not appear in English until the fall of 1943.

== History ==
=== Background ===
In the spring of 1921, with the Soviet Russia stricken by hyperinflation and factory shutdowns, its great cities depopulated and its economy on the verge of collapse, Soviet leader V. I. Lenin and the ruling Russian Communist Party (Bolsheviks) (RKP) launched a program of internal trade liberalization and monetary reform known as the New Economic Policy. This market-based retreat from the collectivist goals of the period of War Communism proved controversial among Communist Party members, with various interpretations of the deep meaning of the new program and schemes for a path forward to socialism in largely agrarian Russia gaining currency.

By 1923, the impact of these earlier reforms had begun to make itself felt through economic recovery. Moreover, by this date initial dreams of an immediate world revolution in the industrialized nations of Western Europe which would rescue the economy of economically backwards Russia had faded, indelibly colored by the failure of the 1923 Communist uprising in Germany in October of that year.

Further complicating the situation was a growing power struggle in the governing Central Committee of the Communist Party, pitting a majority consisting of Grigory Zinoviev, Lev Kamenev, Joseph Stalin, and other long-time party members against a charismatic upstart who had only a few years earlier joined the RKP, Leon Trotsky. With Lenin ill from a series of strokes which began to fall him in 1923, these and other aspiring national leaders began to jockey for hegemony in the Bolshevik organization, attempting to make use of published economic and political analysis to demonstrate their own particular for the mantle of supreme leadership.

It was within this milieu that Trotsky published a series of articles in the official party daily newspaper, Pravda, in December 1923, sharply criticizing trends within the Communist Party towards bureaucratism — a critique which by extension was an appeal to the rank-and-file of the party organization for personal support vis-a-vis Zinoviev, Kamenev, Stalin, and other established party leaders.

=== Structure ===
The New Course was not published in English until this September 1943 edition by the Workers Party, featuring a translation by Max Shachtman.

The New Course includes three articles reprinted as chapters verbatim from the pages of Pravda, a fourth chapter being an outline of a report on “Bureaucratism and the Revolution,” and three additional chapters written especially for the new publication. Also included by Trotsky in the book as appendices are a letter, two more December 1923 Pravda articles, and a short open letter signed by 8 young Communist Party activists.

There are in all a total of 7 short chapters, 3 chapter-length appendices, and a brief manifesto, with the count of pages of the Russian language first edition sitting at 104. Page count of the same material in English translation is similar, running between 80 and 110 octavo pages depending upon the edition.

== Contents ==
Chapter 1. The Question of Party Generations

Chapter 2. The Social Composition of the Party

Chapter 3. Groups and Factional Formations

Chapter 4. Bureaucratism and the Revolution

Chapter 5. Tradition and Revolutionary Policy

Chapter 6. The "Underestimation" of the Peasantry

Chapter 7. Planned Economy (Order No. 1042)

Appendix 1. The New Course

Appendix 2. Functionarism in the Army and Elsewhere

Appendix 3. On the "Smytchka" Between Town and Country

Appendix 4. Two Generations

== First editions ==
The New Course has been translated and published in a variety of languages. First national editions include the following:

Country	Date	Translator	Comments
Soviet Union	January 1924	not applicable	Published by the "Krasnaia nov'" publishing house in conjunction with Glavpolitprosvet.
France	1924	Boris Souvarine	
Germany	1924		
Czechoslovakia	1924		
Spain	1928		
United States	September 1943	Max Shachtman	Published under single covers with Shachtman's The Struggle for the New Course.
United Kingdom	October 1956		
Japan	November 1963		
China	1965		
Italy	March 1967		
Sweden	May 1972		
Yugoslavia	1972		

== See also ==
- List of books by Leon Trotsky
