= United Opposition =

United Opposition may refer to:

- United Opposition (Greece)
- United Opposition (Hungary, 1930s)
- United Opposition (India, 2022)
- United Opposition (Philippines)
- United Opposition (Soviet Union)
- United Opposition of Serbia
- United Opposition (Yugoslavia), a 1935 election list in the Kingdom of Yugoslavia

== See also ==
- Opposition (politics)
- United for Hungary, previously known as United Opposition
