= Budenovka =

Russian hat

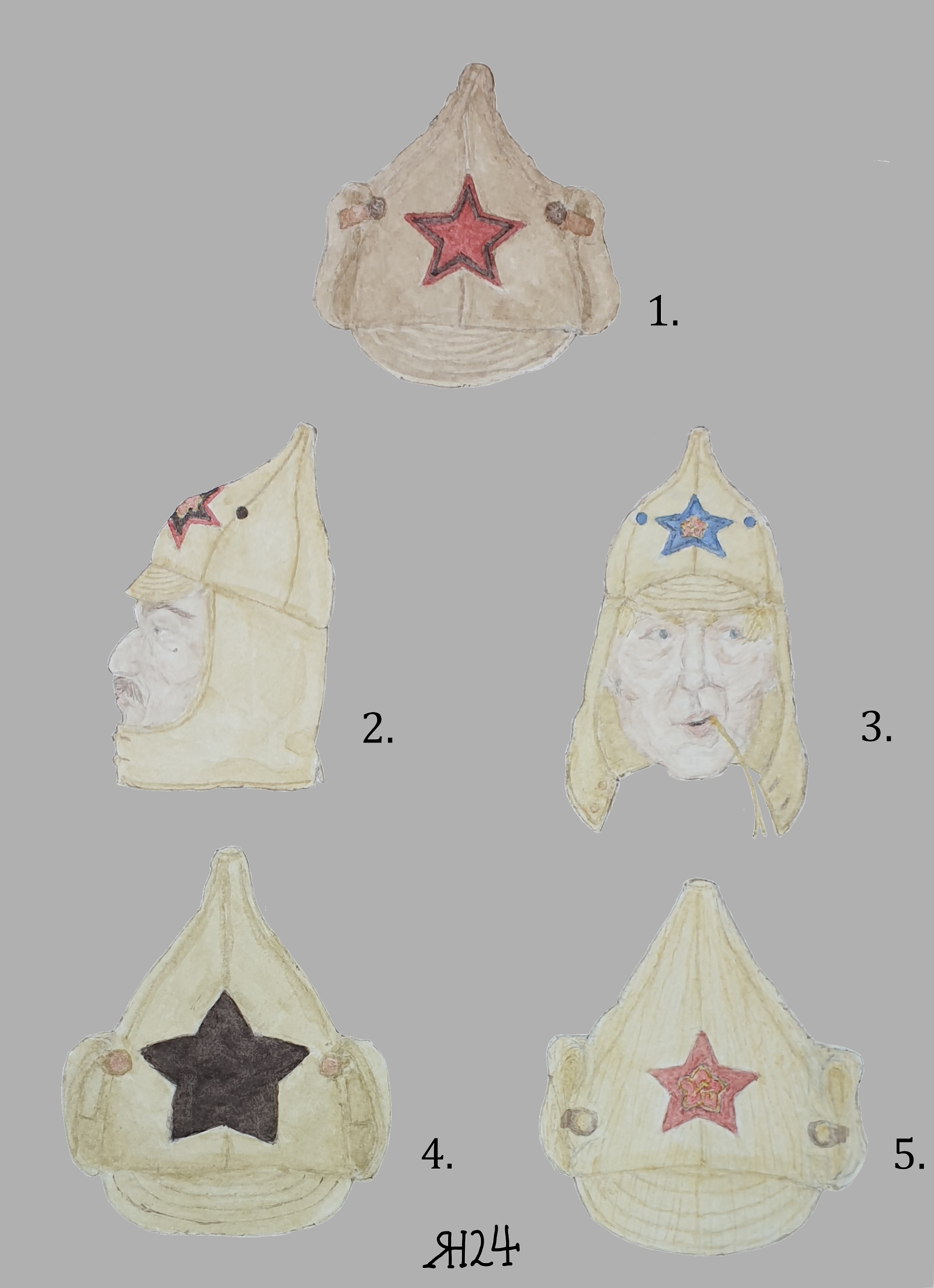
- Various examples of the M1919 Budenovka
- Type: Broadcloth Hat (Note: Officially designated as a "broadcloth helmet" by the Soviet government)
- Place of origin: RSFSR

Service history
- In service: 1918 (Note: Officially authorised in January 1919)–1942 (frontline Soviet use)
- Used by: RSFSR; Soviet Union
- Wars: Russian Civil War; Ukrainian–Soviet War; Polish–Soviet War; Sino-Soviet conflict (1929); Second World War

Production history
- Designer: Viktor Vasnetsov
- Designed: 1918
- Produced: 1918–?

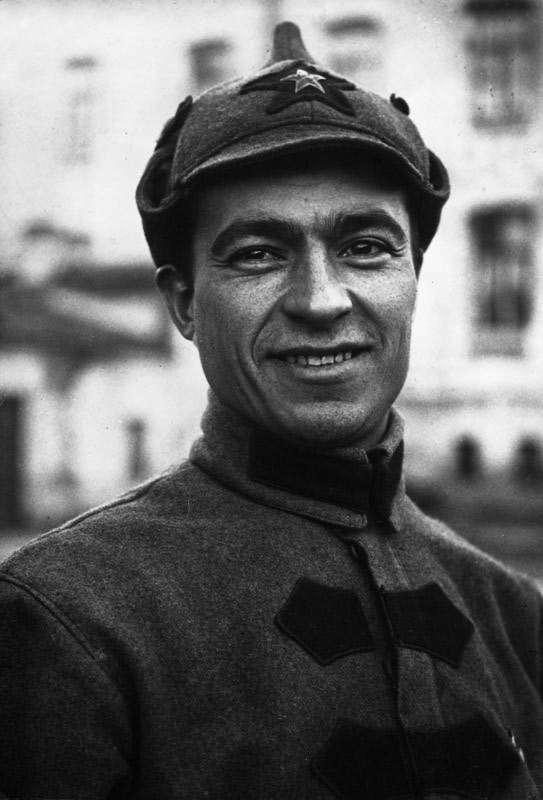
A Red Army soldier wearing a budenovka in 1926

A budenovka (Russian: будёновка, romanized: budyonovka, IPA: [bʊˈdʲɵnəfkə]) is a distinctive type of hat, an archetypal part of the Communist military uniforms of the Russian Civil War following the Russian Revolution (1917–1922) and later conflicts. Its official name was the "broadcloth helmet" (шлем суконный). Named after Red Army cavalry commander Semyon Budyonny, it was also known as the "frunzenka" after the Commissar Mikhail Frunze. It is a soft, woolen hat that covers the ears and neck. The cap features a peak and folded earflaps that can be buttoned under the chin. It was largely phased out of use by the beginning of the Great Patriotic War, but its distinctive shape remains iconic as a symbol of the Red Army during the interwar years.

== History ==
The hat was designed by Viktor Vasnetsov, a famous Russian painter, who was inspired by a 12th-century knight's helmet, which was made of broadcloth with a peaked top and flaps that could be tied to the chin for warmth. The original name was bogatyrka (богатырка) – the helmet of a bogatyr – and was intended to inspire Russian troops by connecting them with the legendary heroes of Russian folklore.

The budenovka entered service in 1918.

As authorised in January 1919, the budenovka was intended as a winter headdress. Made of khaki cloth, the hat included flaps capable of being pulled down and fastened under the chin. The distinctive spike was created by a stiffened coil sewn into the crown and covered by khaki cloth. The initial model with the high tip was replaced with a more practical low-tip model in 1927. A summer version briefly existed, made from lighter cloth and lacking flaps.

The hat was not part of the Red Army uniform for long, for both political and practical reasons. Although it was relatively easy to produce, it required expensive wool, did not provide good cold-weather protection and could not be worn under a helmet. It was abandoned during the army reforms of the mid-1930s, and phasing-out started in 1935. Budenovkas were still in use during the Winter War of 1939, and the failure of Soviet equipment and gear led to the introduction of various improved winter uniforms. The Soviet army was to receive the garrison cap (called the "pilotka"), which would make the helmets more comfortable, and the outdoor ushanka, the latter being based on the Finnish turkislakki army fur caps. In the Red Army, Budenovka had mostly been replaced by the start of the Great Patriotic War in 1941, but some were still used by Soviet reserve troops, factory militia and partisans.

The budenovka became part of history as Red Army cavalry men wearing budennovkas became an iconic cultural image from the Russian civil war, together with tachankas, the Nagant revolver or Mauser C96, Maxim gun and rebelling sailors with ammunition belts slung over their chests. Stylized budyonovkas were still popular children's headwear until the late 60s.

=== Myth of Imperial origins ===
Many apocryphal accounts claim that bogatyrkas were meant to be a part of a new uniform, so they had already been produced during World War I, but were not officially adopted. Another version, quite popular in Russia, is that bogatyrkas were designed for a military parade as a part of a "historical" stylized uniform (which also included an overcoat with "designer" cross-pieces, which evoked those worn by the Streltsy in the 16th to 18th centuries, which also were used in the Red Army to a limited extent). Some Russian historians even speculate the parade in question was a supposed victory parade in Berlin. Some view the bogatyrkas as an evolution of the bashlyk conical hoods worn by the Russian military since the mid-19th century. In reality, the uniform was designed by the Soviet government expressly for the Red Army.

== Gallery ==
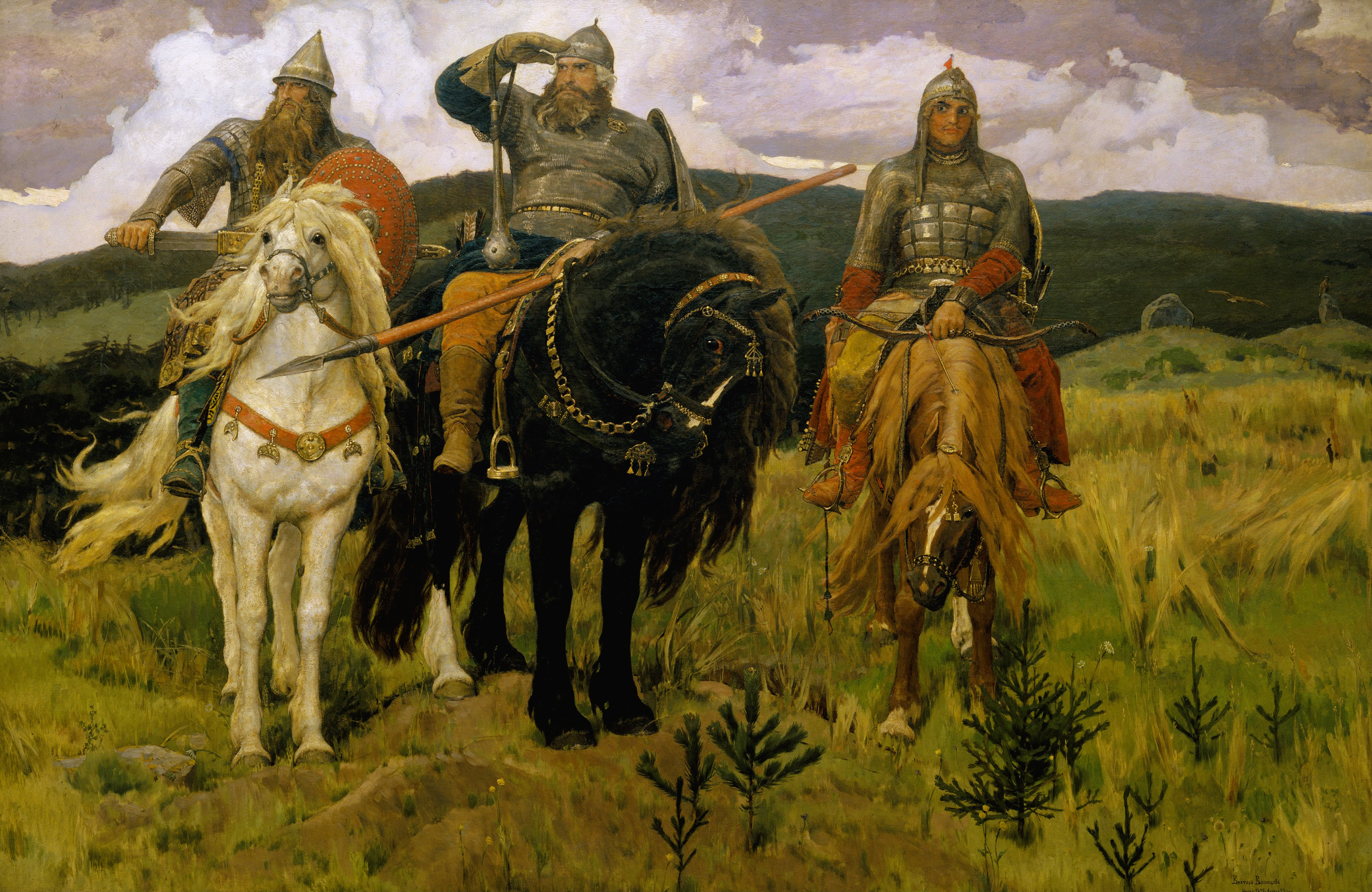
Vasnetsov's idea of bogatyrs, whose helmets inspired the budenovka

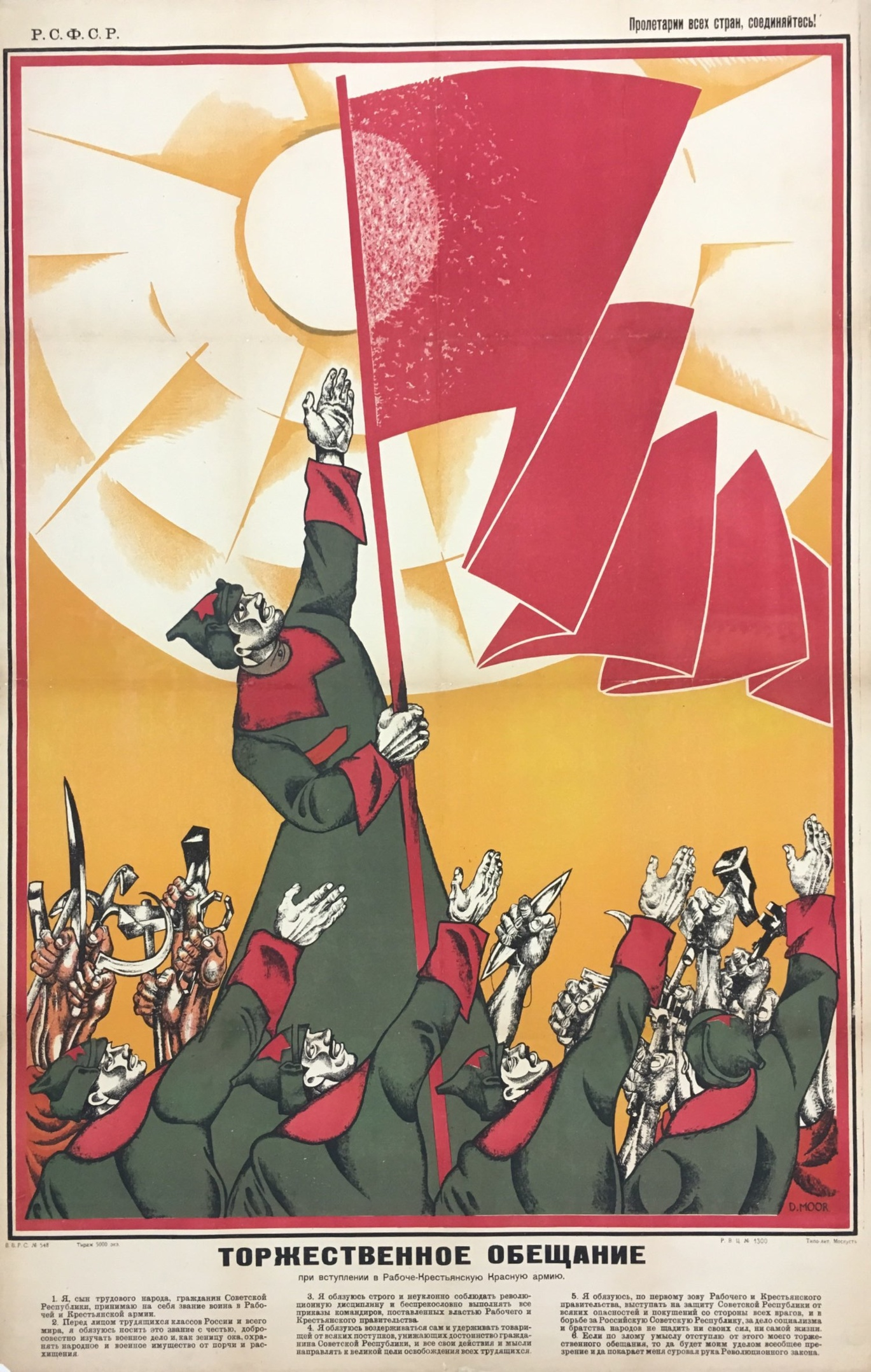
A 1918 poster showing a solemn oath of soldiers joining the Red Army

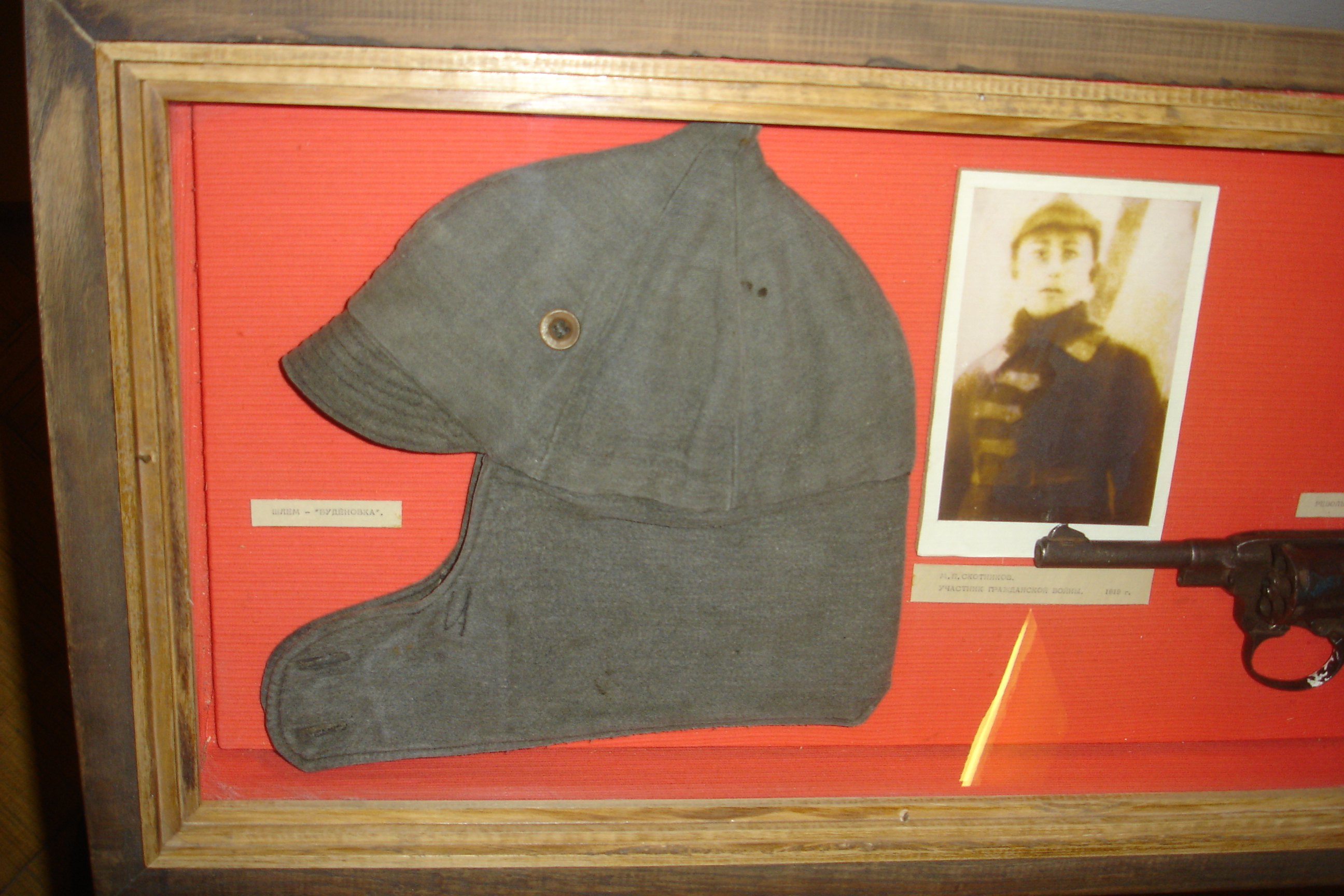
Budenovka from the Russian Civil War on display at a museum

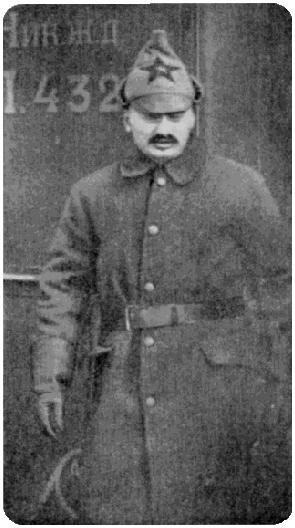
Leon Trotsky wearing a budenovka during the Russian Civil War

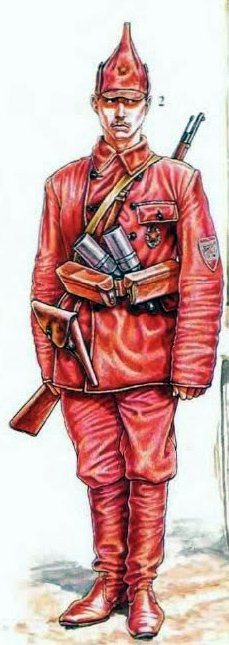
A member of the guard of Trotsky's armored train, color illustration

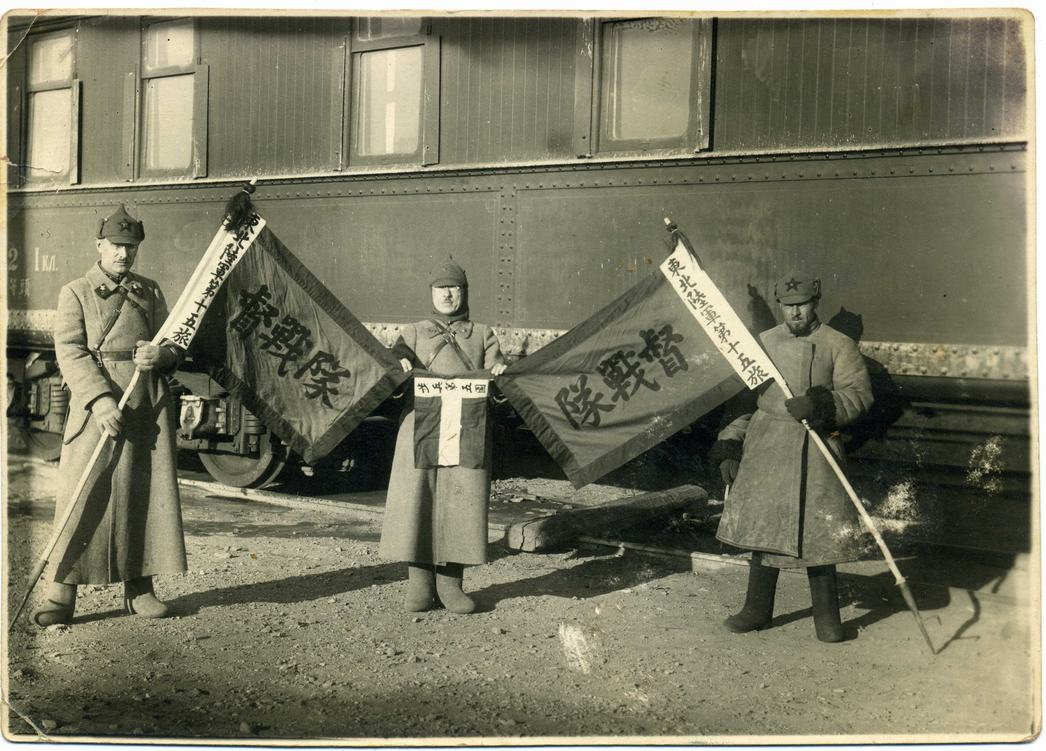
Soviet soldiers with captured Kuomintang banners during the Sino-Soviet conflict, 1929

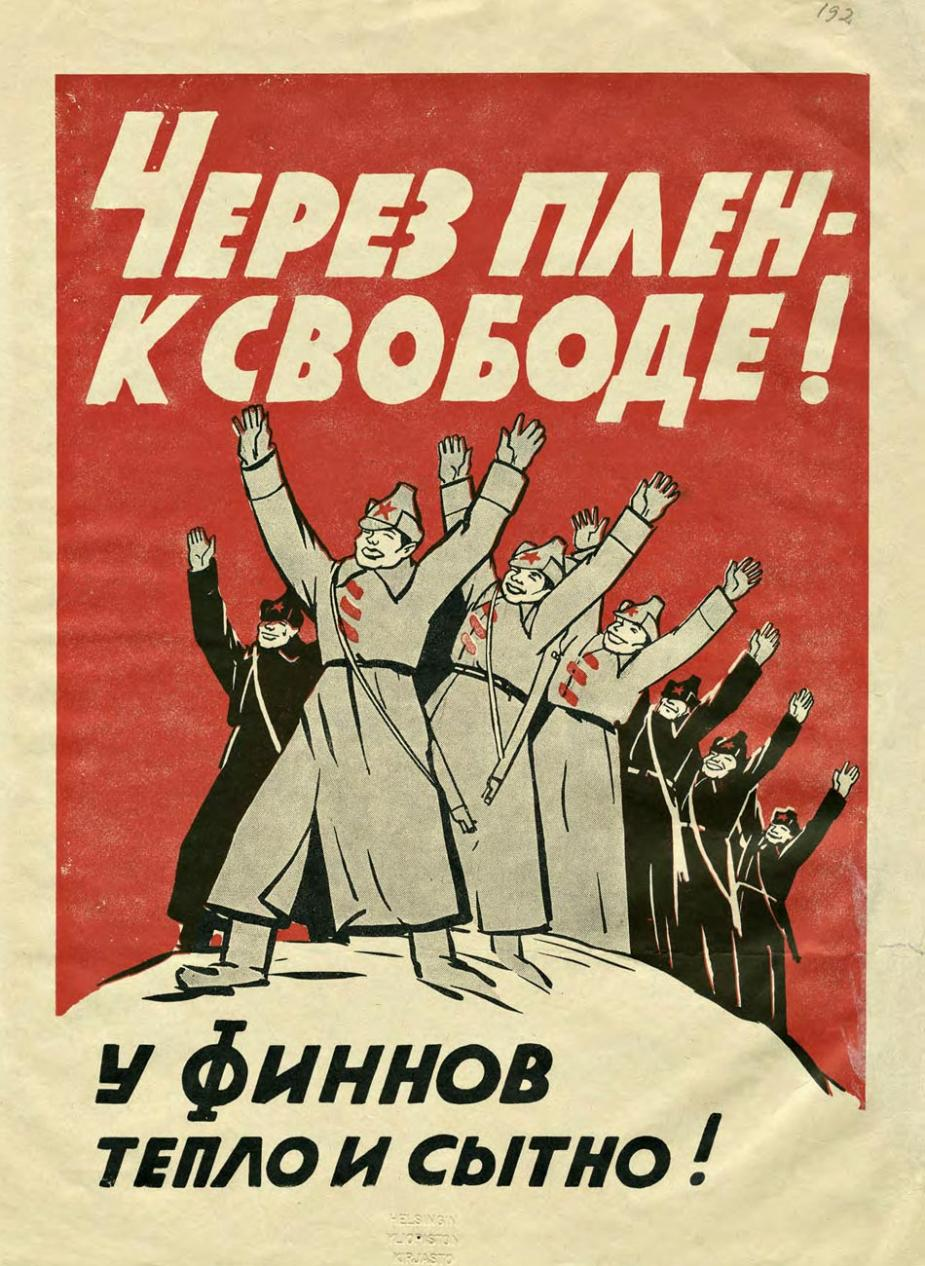
Finnish poster from the Winter War calling on Soviet soldiers to surrender

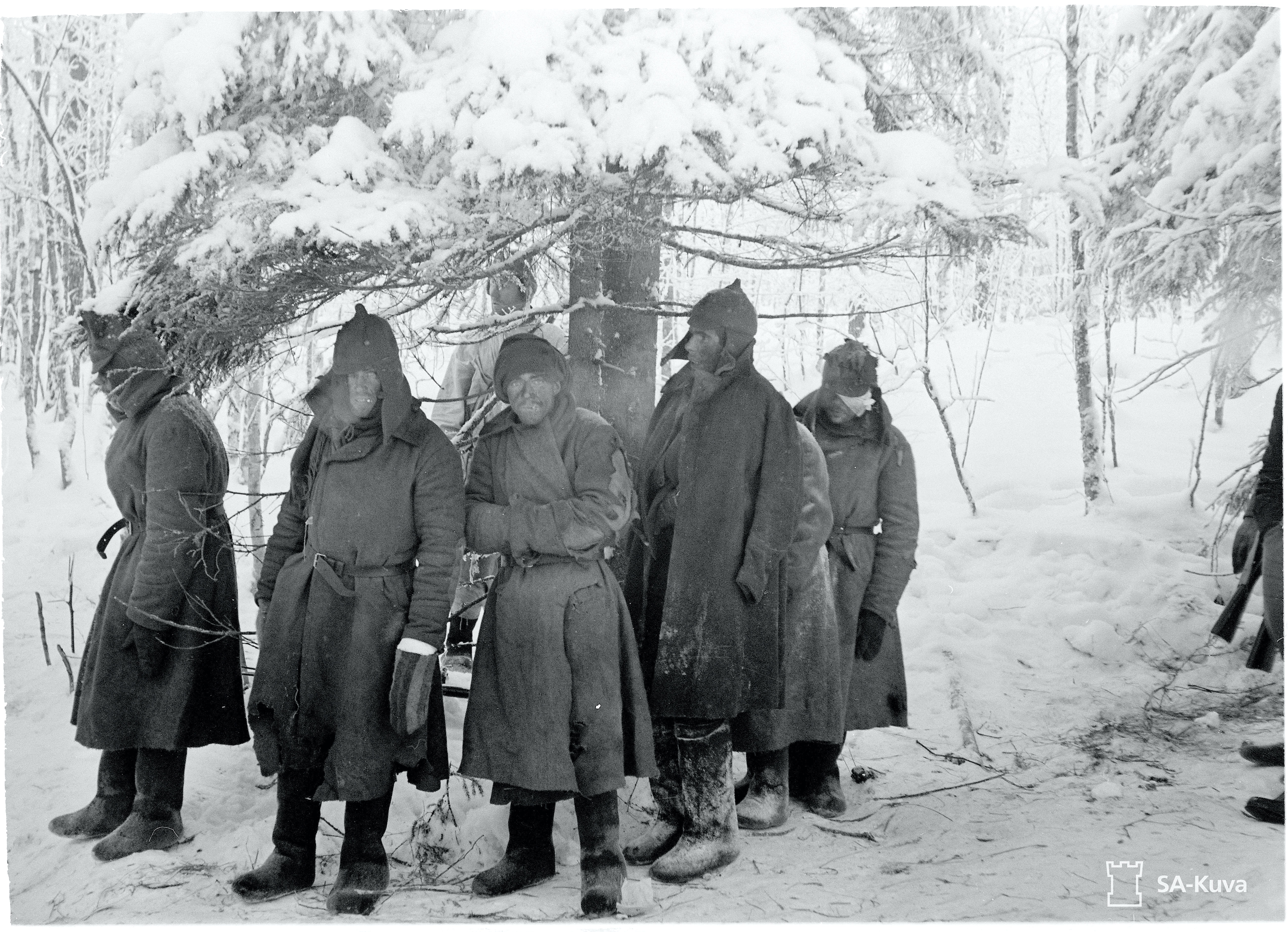
Soviet prisoners wearing the budenovka during the Winter War

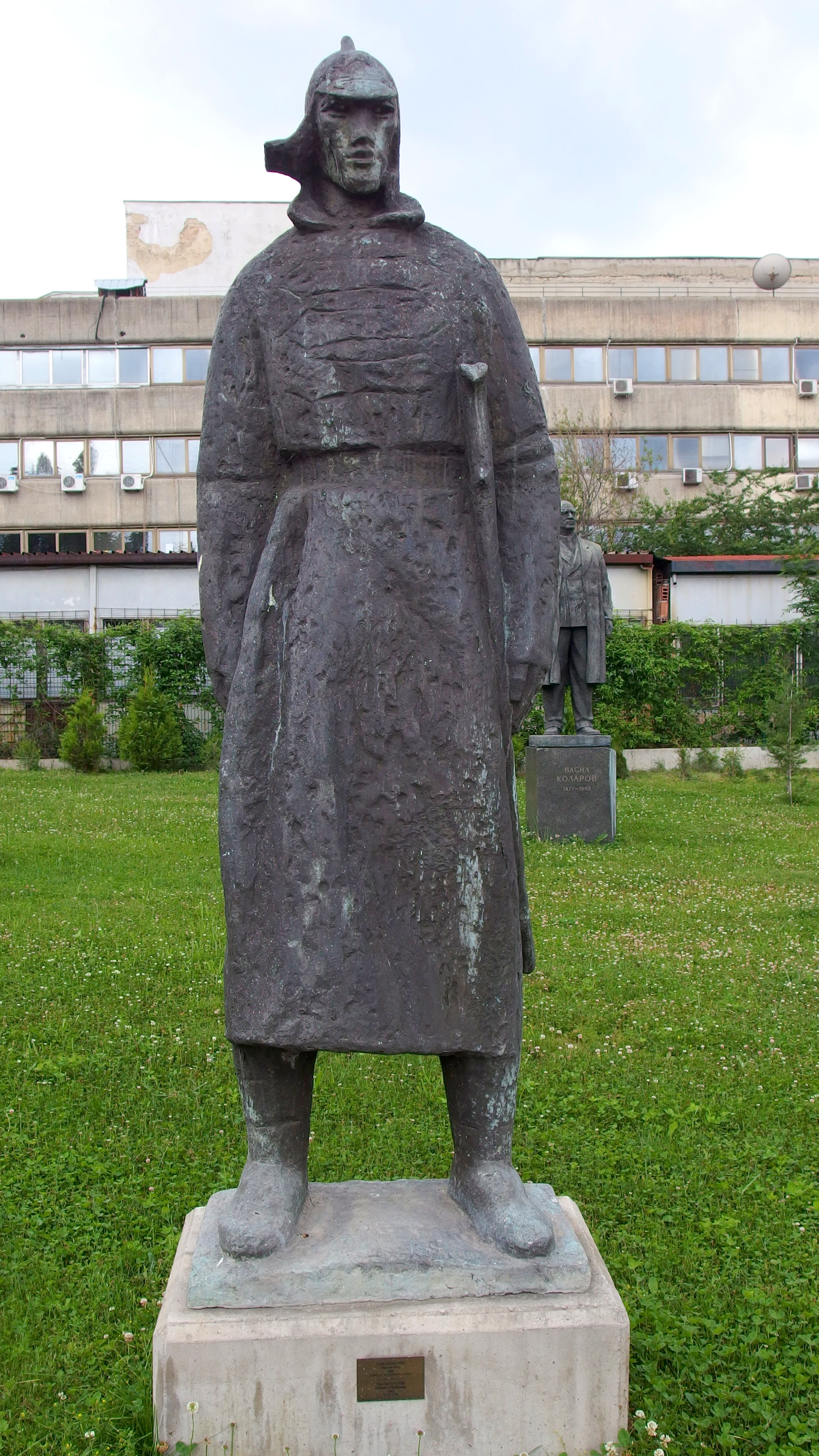
Statue of a Red Army soldier by the Museum of Socialist Art, Bulgaria

== See also ==
- List of hat styles
- Pickelhaube, a spiked helmet
