= Alexander Nove =

British historian (1915–1994)

- Born: 24 November 1915; Saint Petersburg, Russian Empire
- Died: 15 May 1994 (aged 78); Voss Municipality, Norway
- Known for: The Soviet Economy, Political Economy and Soviet Socialism
- Spouse: Irene MacPherson (m. 1951)
- Children: Perry Nove, David Nove, Charles Nove
- Awards: Fellow of the Royal Society of Edinburgh, Fellow of the British Academy

Academic background
- Education: London School of Economics

Academic work
- Institutions: University of Glasgow, University of London

Alexander Nove, FRSE, FBA (born Aleksandr Yakovlevich Novakovsky; Russian: Алекса́ндр Я́ковлевич Новако́вский; also published under Alec Nove; 24 November 1915 – 15 May 1994), a non-Marxist socialist, was Professor of Economics at the University of Glasgow and a noted authority on Russian and Soviet economic history. According to Ian D. Thatcher, "[T]he consensus is that he was one of the most significant scholars of 'Soviet' studies in its widest sense and beyond."

== Life and career ==
Alexander Nove was born in Saint Petersburg, Russia, the son of Jacob Novakovsky. His father was a Menshevik who emigrated with his family in 1924 to Britain. He was educated at King Alfred School in London and received a BSc in economics from the London School of Economics in 1936. The school later made him an Honorary Fellow in 1982.

Nove served in the Royal Signal Corps from 1939 but was transferred to Military Intelligence until 1946, reaching the rank of Major. From 1947 to 1958, he worked in the Civil Service, mainly at the Board of Trade. He was a Reader in Russian Social and Economic Studies at the University of London from 1958 to 1963 and Professor of Economics at the University of Glasgow from 1963 to 1982. He was then Emeritus Professor and Honorary Senior Research Fellow at Glasgow until his death.

In 1982, Nove was elected a Fellow of the Royal Society of Edinburgh. His proposers were William Hugh Clifford Frend, Sydney Checkland, Thomas Wilson, George Wyllie, Sir Kenneth Alexander and Leslie Alcock.

== Personal life and death ==
In 1951, Nove married Irene MacPherson, his second marriage. They had three sons: Perry and David, from his first marriage. Together, they had Charles Nove (born 1960), a broadcaster. Nove died in Voss Municipality, Norway, on 15 May 1994.

== Publications ==
- The Soviet Economy (1961)
- (with J. A. Newth) The Soviet Middle East (1965)
- Was Stalin Really Necessary? (1965)
- (ed. with D. M. Nuti) Socialist Economics (1972)
- Efficiency Criteria for Nationalised Industries (1973)
- Stalinism and After (1976)
- The Soviet Economic System (1977, 3rd edn 1986)
- Political Economy and Soviet Socialism (1979)
- The Economics of Feasible Socialism (1983)
- Socialism, Economics and Development (1986)
- Glasnost in Action (1989)
- Economics of Feasible Socialism Revisited (1991)
- Studies in Economics and Russia (1991)
- An Economic History of the USSR: 1917-1991 (London, Penguin, third edition 1992)
- (ed.) The Stalin Phenomenon (1993)

== Sources ==
- "Nove, Prof. Alexander". WHO'S WHO 1992: AN ANNUAL BIOGRAPHICAL DICTIONARY (144th ed.). New York: St. Martin's Press. 1992. p. 1385. ISBN 978-0-312-07513-2 – via Internet Archive.
- Who's Who (UK)
- Works by or about Alexander Nove at the Internet Archive
