= Our Revolution (Trotsky book) =

1906 book by Leon Trotsky

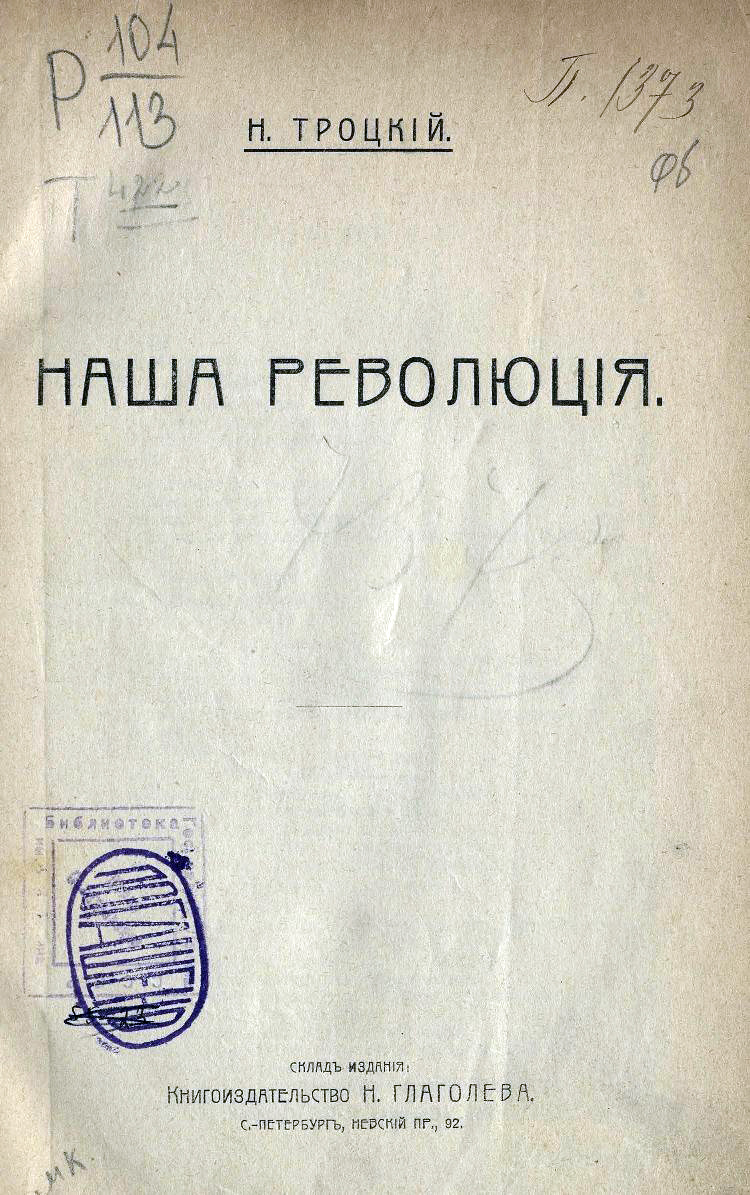
Title page of 1906 edition

Our Revolution (Russian: Наша революция) is a book by Leon Trotsky, published in 1906. Its final article, "Results and Prospects" (Itogi i perspektivy), became the most important and famous part of the work. In the book, Trotsky completed formation of his concept of "permanent revolution" and "the law of uneven and combined development". It blamed the failure of the 1905 Russian Revolution on the inability of the bourgeoisie to lead a liberal democratic revolution, and as such indicated the beginning of Trotsky's ideological shift from the Mensheviks to the Bolsheviks.

== Literature ==
- Knei-Paz B. The Social and Political Thought of Leon Trotsky. — 1st. — Oxford University Press, 1978. — 652 p. — ISBN 978-0-19-827233-5.
- Saccarelli E. Gramsci and Trotsky in the Shadow of Stalinism: The Political Theory and Practice of Opposition. — Routledge, 2008. — 320 p. — ISBN 978-1-135-89980-6.
- Brossat A. Aux origines de la révolution permanente: la pensée politique du jeune Trotsky. — F. Maspero, 1974. — 319 p. — (Les Textes à l'appui. Histoire contemporaine).
- Howard M. C., King J. E. Trotsky on Uneven and Combined Development // A History of Marxian Economics. — Princeton University Press, 1989. — Т. I: 1883–1929. — 374 p. — (Princeton Legacy Library, 1). — ISBN 978-1-4008-6052-4.
- Löwy M. Permanent revolution in Russia // The Politics of Combined and Uneven Development: The Theory of Permanent Revolution. — Haymarket Books, 2010. — 162 p. — ISBN 978-1-60846-068-7.
