= The Permanent Revolution and Results and Prospects =

1919 book by Leon Trotsky

- Author: Leon Trotsky
- Translator: John G. Wright
- Language: Russian, English
- Genre: Non-Fiction
- Publisher: Progress Publishers; New Park Publications; Red Letter Press
- Publication date: 1930
- Publication place: Soviet Union
- Media type: Print.

The Permanent Revolution and Results and Prospects is a 1930 book published by Bolshevik-Soviet politician and former head of The Red Army Leon Trotsky. It was first published by the Left Opposition in the Russian language in Germany in 1930. The book was translated into English by John G. Wright and published by New Park Publications in 1931.

== Synopsis ==
=== "The Permanent Revolution" ===
"The Permanent Revolution" is a 1928 essay written by Leon Trotsky in response to criticism given by Soviet politician Karl Radek. The work was published in Russian by The Left Opposition after the expulsion of Trotsky from The Communist Party of the Soviet Union in 1927. It is a political theory book by Trotsky. Its title is the name of the concept of permanent revolution advocated by Trotsky and Trotskyists in opposition to the concept of socialism in one country as advocated by Joseph Stalin and Stalinists.

This was published after the death of Vladimir Lenin which triggered a power struggle within military, bureaucratic, legislative bodies within the Communist Party of the Soviet Union. General Secretary Joseph Stalin formed a political alliance with Lev Kamenev, Grigory Zinoviev and Nikolai Bukharin, who opposed Trotsky within the Politburo and the Central Committee. Stalin's bloc pursued an isolationist policy referred to as Socialism in One Country, which emphasized placing economic development before world revolution. Trotsky in contrast, saw this as a “revisionist” deviation from Marxism and Leninism, and in contrast proclaimed the Marxist ideology strategy of permanent revolution.

=== "Results and Prospects" ===
Results and Prospects is a 1906 essay written by Trotsky as a reaction to the 1905 Russian Revolution.

== Historical evaluation ==
According to political scientist Baruch Knei-Paz, Trotsky's theory of "permanent revolution" was grossly misrepresented by Stalin as defeatist and adventurist during the succession struggle when in fact Trotsky encouraged revolutions in Europe but was not at any time proposing "reckless confrontations" with the capitalist world. In the view of Knei-Paz, Trotsky was in fact supportive of economic reforms such as a rapid pace of industrialisation and a positive approach to internal possibilities, this would later be appropriated by Stalin but for the purpose of supporting his drive for socialism in one country.

Biographer, Isaac Deutscher, stated that Trotsky explicitly supported revolution through proletarian internationalism but was opposed to achieving this via military conquest. Deutscher made references to his documented opposition to the war with Poland in 1920, his proposed armistice with the Entente and temperance with staging anti-British revolts in the Middle East.

== See also ==
- Leon Trotsky bibliography
