= Ian Thatcher =

Historian of Russia

Ian D. Thatcher
- Born: Middlesbrough

Academic work
- Institutions: Ulster University, University of Glasgow, University of Auckland, University of Leicester, Brunel University
- Main interests: Russian history, Soviet history, Russian Revolution, History of social democracy in Russia

Ian D. Thatcher is a scholar of Russia and a Professor at Ulster University. He co-founded Journal of Trotsky Studies and Studies in Marxism and served on the editorial boards of Europe-Asia Studies and Scottish Slavonic Review. He is a editorial board member of Revolutionary Russia and a Series Editor of The Bloomsbury Modern Russian History Series.

Thatcher developed an interest in the Russian Revolution and Soviet history in O-Level history because Middlesbrough was "suffering from the newly elected and much hated in my area Thatcher government." Trotsky stood out to him as "a Bolshevik who still believed in socialism even though the regime in Russia had exiled him."

At the University of Glasgow he collaborated with Alec Nove, a Professor of Economics and an authority on Russian and Soviet economic history. After Nove's death, Thatcher said "[T]he consensus is that he was one of the most significant scholars of 'Soviet' studies in its widest sense and beyond."

== Selected works ==
- Perspectives on Stalinism: A Critical Assessment (1987).
- Journal of Trotsky Studies (1993–1996)
- Markets and Socialism. Edward Elgar Publishing. 1994. ISBN 9781852788421. (co-editor with Alec Nove)
- Alec Nove on Economic Theory: Previously Unpublished Writings. Edward Elgar Publishing. 1998. ISBN 9781858988290. (editor)
- Alec Nove on Communist and Postcommunist Countries: Previously Unpublished Writings. Edward Elgar Publishing. 1998. ISBN 9781858988627. (editor)
- Regime and Society in Twentieth-Century Russia. Palgrave Macmillan. 1999. ISBN 9781349271870. (editor)
- Leon Trotsky and World War One, August 1914–February 1917. Palgrave Macmillan. 2000. ISBN 9780333918067.
- Trotsky. Routledge. 2003. ISBN 9780415232517.
- Late imperial Russia: Problems and prospects. Manchester University Press. 2005. ISBN 9780719067877. (editor)
- Reinterpreting Revolutionary Russia. Palgrave Macmillan. 2006. ISBN 9781403998989. (editor)
- The Russian Provisional Government 1917. Slavica. 2026. ISBN 9780893575458. (2026)
