= The Social and Political Thought of Leon Trotsky =

1978 book by Baruch Knei-Paz

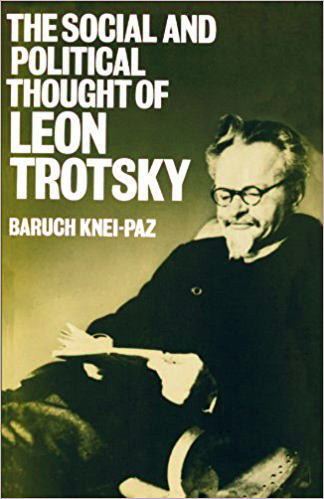
- Cover of the first edition (1978)
- Author: Baruch Knei-Paz
- Subject: Russian history, political philosophy
- Published: 1978 (Oxford University Press)
- Pages: 652
- ISBN: 9780198272335

The Social and Political Thought of Leon Trotsky, is a history book by professor Baruch Knei-Paz, containing an in-depth analysis of the evolution of the social and political views of Leon Trotsky.
