= Permanent revolution =

Concept in Marxist theory

Permanent revolution is the strategy of a revolutionary class pursuing its own interests independently and without compromise or alliance with opposing sections of society. As a term within Marxist theory, it was coined by Karl Marx and Friedrich Engels as early as 1850. Since then different theorists, most notably Leon Trotsky (1879–1940), have used the phrase to refer to different concepts.

Trotsky's permanent revolution is an explanation of how socialist revolutions could occur in societies that have not achieved an advanced capitalist mode of production. Trotsky's theory also argues that the bourgeoisie in late-developing capitalist countries are incapable of developing the productive forces in such a manner as to achieve the sort of advanced capitalism which will fully develop an industrial proletariat; and that the proletariat can and must therefore seize social, economic and political power, leading an alliance with the peasantry. Trotsky also opposed Joseph Stalin's principle of socialism in one country and stated that socialist revolutions needed to happen across the world in order to combat the global capitalist hegemony. According to Trotskyists such as Russian historian Vadim Rogovin (1937–1998), the success of Stalin's theoretical position had a significant and negative impact on the international revolutionary process.

Marx's view of "permanent" revolution sees revolutionary activity as continuously ongoing until the revolutionary forces achieve a defined goal (such as socialism or communism). This contrasts with the permanent (that is, ongoing forever) revolutionary activity envisaged in Maoist Continuous Revolution Theory.

== Karl Marx and Friedrich Engels ==
Marx first used the term in the phrase "by substituting permanent war for permanent revolution" in the following passage from The Holy Family (1844) in which he wrote that "Napoleon represented the last battle of revolutionary terror against the bourgeois society ... He perfected the terror by substituting permanent war for permanent revolution. " Marx said that Napoleon prevented the bourgeois revolution in France from becoming fulfilled; that is, he prevented bourgeois political forces from achieving a total expression of their interests. According to Marx, he did this by suppressing the "liberalism of bourgeois society" and did it because he saw "the state as an end in itself", a value which supported his "political aim of conquest". Thus, he substituted "permanent war for permanent revolution". However, the final two sentences show that the bourgeoisie did not give up hope, but continued to pursue their interests. For Marx, permanent revolution involves a revolutionary class (in this case, the bourgeoisie) continuing to push for and achieve its interests despite the political dominance of actors with opposing interests.

By 1849, Marx and Engels were able to quote the use of the phrase by other writers (Eugen Alexis Schwanbeck, a journalist on the Kölnische Zeitung [Cologne Newspaper]; and Henri Druey), suggesting that it had achieved some recognition in intellectual circles.

=== Address of the Central Committee to the Communist League ===
Marx's most famous use of the phrase permanent revolution is his March 1850 Address of the Central Committee to the Communist League. His audience is the proletariat in Germany, faced with the prospect that "the petty-bourgeois democrats will for the moment acquire a predominant influence", i.e., temporary political power. He enjoins them as such:

While the democratic petty bourgeois want to bring the revolution to an end as quickly as possible, achieving at most the aims already mentioned, it is our interest and our task to make the revolution permanent until all the more or less propertied classes have been driven from their ruling positions, until the proletariat has conquered state power and until the association of the proletarians has progressed sufficiently far – not only in one country but in all the leading countries of the world – that competition between the proletarians of these countries ceases and at least the decisive forces of production are concentrated in the hands of the workers.

In the remainder of the text, Marx outlines his proposal that the proletariat "make the revolution permanent". In essence, it consists of the working class maintaining a militant and independent approach to politics both before, during and after the struggle which will bring the petty-bourgeois democrats to power.

==== Political programme of demands which threaten the bourgeois consensus ====
In an article two years earlier, Marx had referred to "a programme of permanent revolution, of progressive taxes and death duties, and of organisation of labour". This confirms the impression that Marx's theory of permanent revolution is not about revolution per se, but rather more about the attitude that a revolutionary class should adopt in the period of their political subjection, including the programme of political demands they should propose. This aspect is raised in the Address. As well as overtures for organisational alliance with the petty bourgeoisie, Marx is concerned about attempts to "bribe the workers with a more or less disguised form of alms and to break their revolutionary strength by temporarily rendering their situation tolerable". Therefore, the workers' party must use their autonomous organisation to push a political programme which threatens the bourgeois status quo along the following lines:

1. They can force the democrats to make inroads into as many areas of the existing social order as possible, so as to disturb its regular functioning and so that the petty-bourgeois democrats compromise themselves; furthermore, the workers can force the concentration of as many productive forces as possible – means of transport, factories, railways, etc. – in the hands of the state.

2. They must drive the proposals of the democrats to their logical extreme (the democrats will in any case act in a reformist and not a revolutionary manner) and transform these proposals into direct attacks on private property. If, for instance, the petty bourgeoisie propose the purchase of the railways and factories, the workers must demand that these railways and factories simply be confiscated by the state without compensation as the property of reactionaries. [...] The demands of the workers will thus have to be adjusted according to the measures and concessions of the democrats.

In this passage, we can see that Marx believes the proletariat should refuse to moderate its demands to the petty-bourgeois consensus and advocate extensive nationalisation. Furthermore, the demand of the workers should always seek to push the bourgeois further than they are prepared to go, without the revolution threatening them as well.

==== In context ====
Marx concludes his Address by summarising the themes elucidated above:

Although the German workers cannot come to power and achieve the realization of their class interests without passing through a protracted revolutionary development, this time they can at least be certain that the first act of the approaching revolutionary drama will coincide with the direct victory of their own class in France and will thereby be accelerated. But they themselves must contribute most to their final victory, by informing themselves of their own class interests, by taking up their independent political position as soon as possible, by not allowing themselves to be misled by the hypocritical phrases of the democratic petty bourgeoisie into doubting for one minute the necessity of an independently organized party of the proletariat. Their battle-cry must be: The Permanent Revolution.

Since Marxism emphasises the contingency of political developments on material historical circumstances (as against idealism), it is worthwhile to have some idea of how Marx saw the context in which he advocated permanent revolution. It seems that he believed that "the first act of the approaching revolutionary drama [in Germany] will coincide with the direct victory of their own class in France and will thereby be accelerated". That is, the petty-bourgeois are expected to come to power in Germany at the same time as the direct victory of the proletariat in France. Furthermore, Marx seems to believe that the former and hence of both is "imminent" (cf. the third paragraph of the Address). Therefore, Marx clearly believes that Europe is entering a time and is at a level of development of the productive forces in which the proletariat have the social revolution within their reach. Although circumstances did not develop as anticipated, this observation proved accurate at the dawn of the 20th century leading into the First World War and the Russian Revolution.

=== Relation to Trotskyist theory ===
Marx and Engels advocated permanent revolution as the proletarian strategy of maintaining organisational independence along class lines and a consistently militant series of political demands and tactics. However, at no stage does Marx make the central claim with which Trotsky's conception of permanent revolution is concerned, i.e., that it is possible for a country to pass directly from the dominance of the semi-feudal aristocrats, who held political power in Russia in the early part of the 19th century, to the dominance of the working class, without an interceding period of dominance by the bourgeoisie. On the contrary, Marx's statements in his March 1850 Address explicitly contradict such a view, assuming a "period of petty-bourgeois predominance over the classes which have been overthrown and over the proletariat". In his History of the Russian Revolution, Trotsky argues that this was shortened to the period between February and October 1917.

It must be borne in mind that for Marx the dominance of the bourgeoisie as a prerequisite for subsequent proletarian rule holds on a world scale as The Communist Manifesto makes clear that despite: "Though not in substance, yet in form, the struggle of the proletariat with the bourgeoisie is at first a national struggle" (loc. cit.). Trotsky's theory took it for granted (as did Vladimir Lenin in The State and Revolution) that the domination of the world by the bourgeoisie was complete and irreversible after the emergence of imperialism in the late 19th century. The uncertain relationship between international and national parameters in relation to class power underlies many of the disputes concerning the theory of the permanent revolution.

In the preface to the 1882 Russian edition of The Communist Manifesto, Marx and Engels explicitly raised the issues Trotsky would later develop: "Now the question is: can the Russian obshchina, though greatly undermined, yet a form of primeval common ownership of land, pass directly to the higher form of Communist common ownership? Or, on the contrary, must it first pass through the same process of dissolution such as constitutes the historical evolution of the West? The only answer to that possible today is this: If the Russian Revolution becomes the signal for a proletarian revolution in the West, so that both complement each other, the present Russian common ownership of land may serve as the starting point for a communist development".

== Leon Trotsky ==
Leon Trotsky's conception of permanent revolution is based on his understanding—drawing on the work of fellow Russian Alexander Parvus—that a Marxist analysis of events begins with the international level of development, both economic and social. National peculiarities are only an expression of the contradictions in the world system. According to this perspective, the tasks of the bourgeois-democratic revolution could not be achieved by the bourgeoisie itself in a reactionary period of world capitalism; Trotsky cites Russia as an example of this. This conception was first developed in the essays later collected in his book 1905 and in his essay Results and Prospects and later developed in his 1929 book The Permanent Revolution.

The basic idea of Trotsky's theory is that in Russia the bourgeoisie would not carry out a thorough revolution which would institute political democracy and solve the land question. These measures were assumed to be essential to develop Russia economically. Therefore, it was argued the future revolution must be led by the proletariat, who would not only carry through the tasks of the bourgeois-democratic revolution, but would also commence a struggle to surpass the bourgeois-democratic revolution itself.

How far the proletariat would be able to continue would depend upon the further course of events and not upon the designation of the revolution as bourgeois-democratic. In this sense, the revolution would be made permanent. Trotsky believed that a new workers' state would not be able to hold out against the pressures of a hostile capitalist world unless socialist revolutions quickly took hold in other countries as well. This notion later became a point of contention with the Stalinist faction within the Bolshevik Party, which held that socialism in one country could be built in the Soviet Union.

Trotsky's theory was developed in opposition to the stagist theory that undeveloped countries must pass through two distinct revolutions. First, the bourgeois-democratic revolution which socialists would assist and at a later stage the socialist revolution with an evolutionary period of capitalist development separating those stages.

Vladimir Lenin and the Bolsheviks initially held to an intermediate theory. Lenin's earlier theory shared Trotsky's premise that the bourgeoisie would not complete a bourgeois revolution. Lenin thought that a democratic dictatorship of the workers and peasants could complete the tasks of the bourgeoisie. By 1917, Lenin was arguing not only that the Russian bourgeoisie would not be able to carry through the tasks of the bourgeois-democratic revolution and therefore the proletariat had to take state power, but also that it should take economic power via a soviet (workers' council). This position was put forward to the Bolsheviks on his return to Russia in his "April Theses". The first reaction of the majority of Bolsheviks was one of rejection. Initially, only Alexandra Kollontai rallied to Lenin's position within the Bolshevik Party.

After the October Revolution, the Bolsheviks, now including Trotsky, did not discuss the theory of permanent revolution as such. However, its basic theses can be found in such popular outlines of communist theory as The ABC of Communism which sought to explain the program of the Bolshevik Party by Yevgeni Preobrazhensky and Nikolai Bukharin. According to Russian historian, Vadim Rogovin, the leadership of the German Communist Party had requested that Moscow send Leon Trotsky to Germany to direct the 1923 insurrection. However, this proposal was rejected by the Politburo which was controlled by Stalin, Zinoviev and Kamenev who decided to send a commission of lower-ranking Russian Communist Party members.

Later on after Lenin's death in the 1920s, the theory did assume importance in the internal debates within the Bolshevik Party and was a bone of contention within the opposition to Joseph Stalin. In essence, a section of the Bolshevik Party leadership, whose views were voiced at the theoretical level by Bukharin, argued that socialism could be built in a single country, even an underdeveloped one like Russia. Bukharin argued that Russia's pre-existing economic base was sufficient for the task at hand, provided the Soviet Union could be militarily defended.

The question of the Northern Expedition and the subjection of the Chinese Communist Party to control by the Kuomintang at the behest of the Bolshevik Party was a topic of argument within the opposition to Stalin in the party. Figures such as Karl Radek argued that a stagist strategy was correct for China. (These writings were lost in the 1930s; if copies exist in the Soviet archives, they have not been located since the dissolution of the Soviet Union.) By contrast, Trotsky generalised his theory of permanent revolution, which had only been previously applied to Russia. He argued that the proletariat needed to take power in a process of uninterrupted and permanent revolution in order to not only carry out the tasks of the bourgeois-democratic revolution, but also to implement socialism.

His position was put forward in his essay entitled The Permanent Revolution which can be found today in a single book together with Results and Prospects. In this essay, Trotsky generalised his theory of permanent revolution and grounded it in the idea of uneven and combined development. In contrast to the conceptions inherent within stagist theory, the theory of uneven and combined development states that all class-based societies, including capitalist nations, develop unevenly and that some parts of these societies will develop more swiftly than others. Trotsky argued that this development is combined, and that each part of the world economy is increasingly bound together with all other parts. The conception of uneven and combined development also recognises that some areas may regress economically and socially as a result of their integration into a world economy.

According to political scientist Baruch Knei-Paz, Trotsky's theory of "permanent revolution" was grossly misrepresented by Stalin as defeatist and adventurist during the succession struggle when in fact Trotsky encouraged revolutions in Europe but was not at any time proposing "reckless confrontations" with the capitalist world.

== Theory since Trotsky ==
=== Trotskyists ===
Since the assassination of Leon Trotsky in 1940, the theory of permanent revolution has been maintained by the various Trotskyist groups which have developed since then. However, the theory has been extended only modestly, if at all. While their conclusions differ, works by mainstream Trotskyist theoreticians such as Robert Chester, Joseph Hansen, Michael Löwy, and Livio Maitan related it to post-war political developments in Algeria, Cuba, and elsewhere.

=== Tony Cliff's deflected permanent revolution ===
An attempt to elaborate an exception to the theory was made by Tony Cliff of the Socialist Workers Party. In a 1963 essay, Cliff develops the idea that where the proletariat is unable to take power, a section of the intelligentsia may be able to carry out a bourgeois revolution. He further argues that the use of Marxist concepts by such elements (most notably in Cuba and China, but also for example by regimes espousing Arab socialism or similar philosophies) is not genuine, but is the use of Marxism as an ideology of power. This reflects his view that these countries are state capitalist societies rather than deformed workers states.

Cliff's views have been criticised by more orthodox Trotskyists as an abandonment of Trotsky's theory in all but name in favour of the stagist theory, countering that Cliff was more cautious than Trotsky about the potential of the working class in underdeveloped countries to seize power. Cliff saw such revolutions as a detour or deflection on the road to socialist revolution rather than a necessary preliminary to it.

=== Saumyendranath Tagore ===
Saumyendranath Tagore, the founder of the Revolutionary Communist Party of India and an international communist leader, argued that "the theory of Permanent Revolution has two aspects, one relating to the revolution of a particular country, the immediate passing over from the bourgeois democratic phase of the revolution to the socialist revolution. The second aspect [...] is related to the international tasks of the revolution [...] which makes it imperative for the first victorious revolution to operate as the yeast of revolution in the world arena. [...] Trotsky became the target of Stalin's vengeance only so far as he drew the attention of the communists throughout the world to the betrayal of world revolution (Permanent Revolution) by Stalin". Tagore also argued that the theory of permanent revolution has nothing to do with Trotskyism, but it is pure Marxism and Leninism. As an example, he points out that the term permanent revolution itself was coined by Marx and Engels back in 1850 in their Address of the Central Committee to the Communist League.

According to Tagore, Lenin was just as much a champion of the permanent revolution as Trotsky was and with a "much more sure grasp of revolutionary reality". However, he argues that Trotsky "certainly had done a great service to revolutionary communism by drawing out attention over and over again to the theory of permanent revolution since Lenin died in 1924 and the sinister anti-revolutionary reign of Stalin started". In the face of what Tagore termed "the next diabolical machineries of vilification and terror of Stalinocracy", Trotsky kept "the banner of revolutionary communism flying in the best traditions of Marx and Lenin. Therein lies Trotsky's invaluable service in the theory of Permanent Revolution. So far as the Theory itself is concerned, it is pure and simple revolutionary Marxism".

== See also ==
- World revolution
- Communist revolution
- Socialism in one country
- Perpetual war
