= Hamburg Uprising =

1923 communist insurrection in Germany

- Part of the revolutions of 1917–1923, the German October and political violence in Germany (1918–1933)
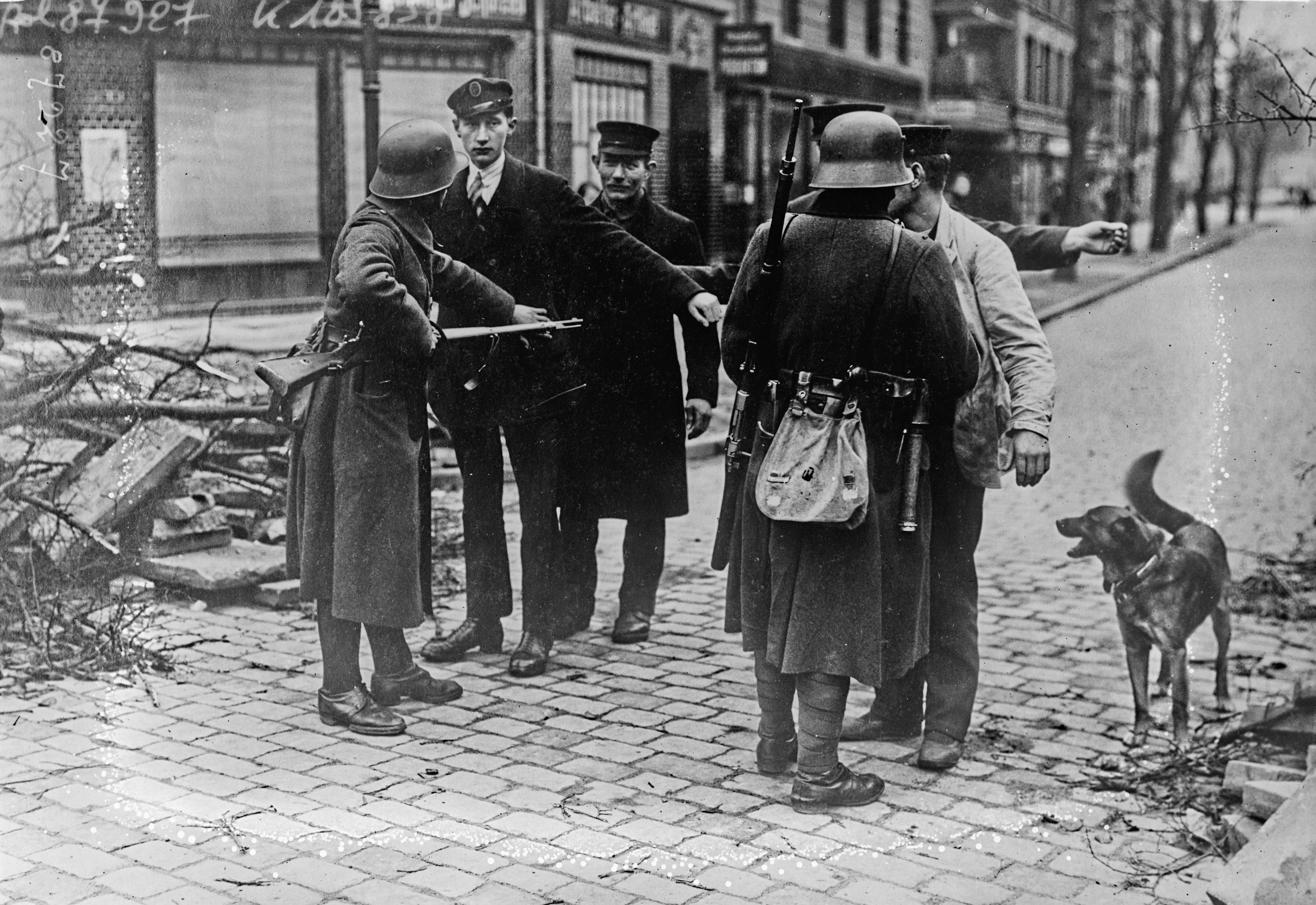
- Reichswehr soldiers searching passersby near a barricade
Date	23–24 October 1923
Location	Hamburg, Germany
Result	Weimar Republic Victory

Belligerents
Weimar Republic; City of Hamburg	Communist Party of Germany; Supported by: Soviet Union

Commanders and leaders
Friedrich Ebert; Arnold Diestel	Hugo Urbahns; Hans Kippenberger; Albert Schreiner; Heinz Neumann; Ernst Thälmann; Manfred Stern

Units involved
Reichswehr; Hamburg Police	Rebel Volunteers

Strength
6,000 police officers and soldiers	5,000

Casualties and losses
17 dead 69 wounded	21 dead 175 wounded 102 captured
- 61 civilians dead 1,400 people arrested

The Hamburg Uprising (German: Hamburger Aufstand) was a communist insurrection that occurred in Hamburg in Weimar Germany on 23 October 1923. A militant section of the Hamburg Communist Party of Germany launched an uprising as part of the so-called German October. Rebels stormed 24 police stations, 17 in Hamburg and seven in Schleswig-Holstein Province in Prussia, and established barricades around the city. The communist insurgency in Hamburg was futile, lacking support from the rest of Germany or from the Soviet Union, and disintegrated within a day. Around 100 people died during the Hamburg Uprising and the exact details of the event, as well as the assessment of its impact, remain controversial.

== Background ==
Between 1919 and 1923, the Weimar Republic was in crisis and there were many violent conflicts between left-wing and right-wing elements. The economic situation of the population was rapidly deteriorating and by autumn 1923 hyperinflation was at its peak, which brought gains in popularity to the Communist Party (KPD). The Occupation of the Ruhr region further radicalized the political disputes. In August 1923, there was a wave of nationwide strikes against Chancellor Wilhelm Cuno, which led to a vote of no-confidence in the Reichstag and his subsequent resignation. At the end of September, the government declared a state of emergency. On 1 October, the Black Reichswehr attempted the Küstrin Putsch. Two weeks later, on 13 October, the Reichstag adopted an enabling act under Article 48 of the Weimar Constitution that, with the stipulation that any decree made under it could be rejected by the Reichstag, was to facilitate a de jure dictatorship by Chancellor Gustav Stresemann until either a change of government or 31 March 1924. A demonstration of several thousand unemployed stormed the "no-protest zone" (Bannmeile) around the Hamburg city hall, an action which, during this period, risked death at the hands of the police and right-wing paramilitaries. In Saxony and Thuringia, coalition governments were formed that included the KPD, which saw this as an opportunity to take over.

Within the international Communist movement, there was discussion of an attempted armed rebellion in Germany. Leon Trotsky and other influential members of the Soviet Politburo and the Comintern advanced the idea, but Heinrich Brandler, head of the KPD, felt it was premature. The exact motives of the small Hamburg group led by Hugo Urbahns and Hans Kippenberger, who planned the uprising, remain unknown.

According to Russian historian Vadim Rogovin, the leadership of the German Communist party had requested that Moscow send Leon Trotsky to Germany to direct the 1923 insurrection. However, this proposal was rejected by the Politburo which was controlled by Stalin, Zinoviev and Kamenev who decided to send a commission of lower-ranking Russian Communist party members. Manfred Stern, a member of the GRU, suggested to Albert Schreiner about using the city of Hamburg as the first staging point for the insurrection with Stern himself acting as a military advisor.

== Uprising ==
Late on 22 October 1923, the military leader of the KP Wasserkante, one of the most militant sections of the Hamburg KPD, received orders via the regional party leadership to begin the rebellion. Only 1,300 took an active part in the rebellion from the beginning, although the Hamburg KPD numbered some 14,000 members. No more than 5,000 workers had participated by the end of it. On 23 October at 5:00 a.m., they stormed 26 police precincts and took weapons from 17 of them.

There was also activity in Altona and the urban district of Stormarn, where the police stations in Schiffbek and Bramfeld were attacked and weapons taken. In Bad Oldesloe, Ahrensburg and Rahlstedt, train tracks and streets were blockaded. In the town of Bargteheide, insurgents arrested local government leaders and proclaimed the "Soviet Republic of Stormarn". In Schiffbek, where the KPD had support, placards were posted to calm residents and to urge support for the uprising, declaring "Long live Soviet Germany! Long live the Federation of Soviet states of the world! Long live the world revolution!"

Most of the uprising was quelled in a few hours. In Schiffbek, it lasted till just past noon. Only in Barmbek, where the KPD had received some 20% of the vote in the previous election, the insurgents were supported by residents, who helped them build barricades and brought them food. The rebels were able to maintain their position during the entire day, despite the continuous exchange of gunfire. At night, however, convinced of the hopelessness of their situation, they snuck away. The next day, the police launched a major offensive against empty barricades.

== Aftermath ==
The Uprising claimed the lives of 17 police officers, 21 rebels and 61 innocent bystanders. Sixty-nine police officers were wounded, along with 175 rebels. There were 1,400 people arrested, with 443 tried in a special court. In Schiffbek alone, 191 people were arrested and later, in February 1925, had to be tried at the Altona Landgericht because of unrest in Schiffbeck, where the KPD had garnered 32.4% of the vote in the May 1924 election. This was the largest of the trials against the Uprising insurgents.

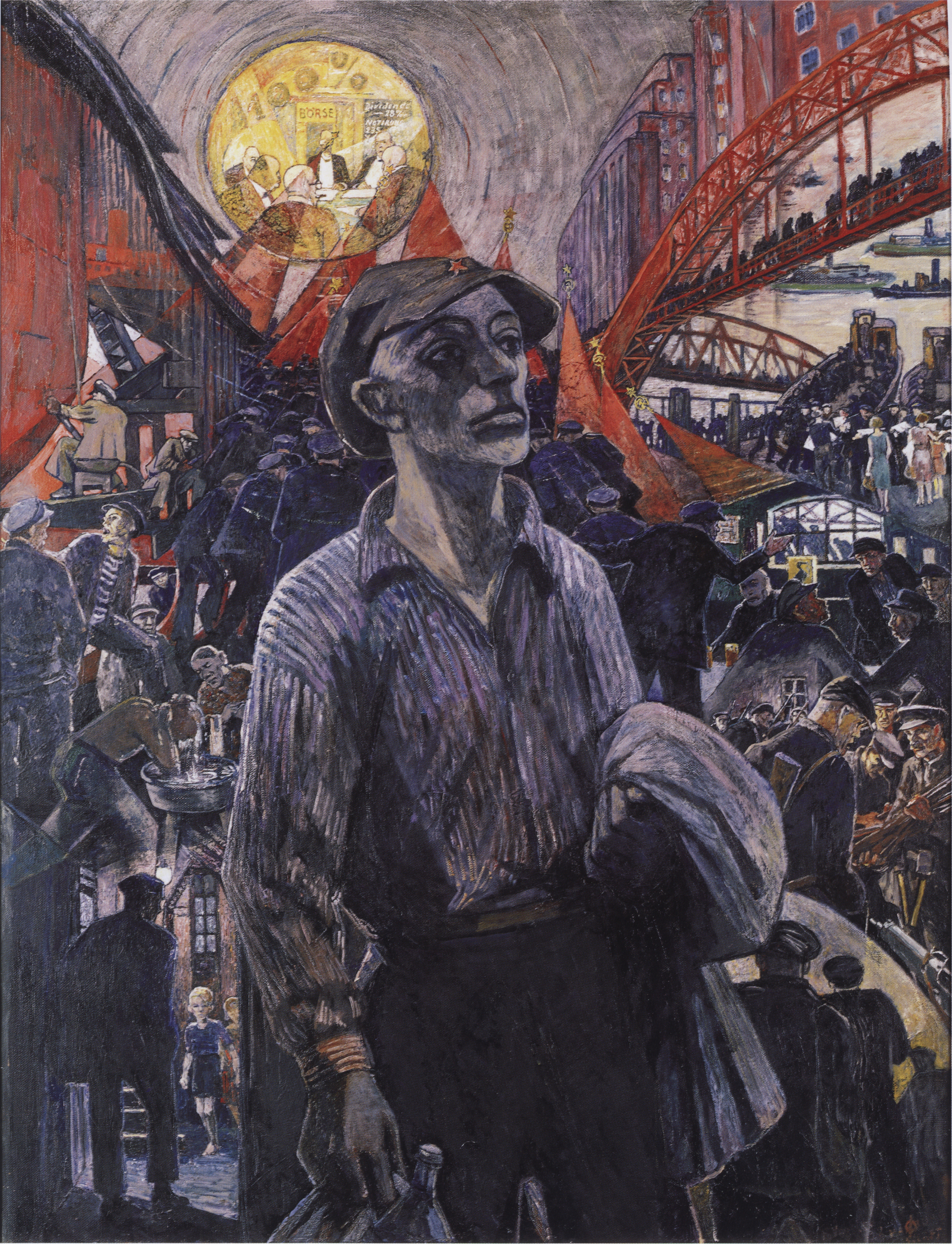
The Hamburger Werftarbeiter ('Hamburg wharf worker'), 1928 painting by Heinrich Vogeler

The Uprising contributed to the deteriorating relationship between the two working class political parties. After the Uprising, the Social Democratic Party of Germany (SPD) refused to work with the KPD and even intensified the repression of the KPD by reinforcing the government's positions. Rejection by both the Republic and the SPD strengthened the Communists. Within the KPD, the Uprising became a heroic legend about the courageous few rebels facing a hopeless fight. The defeat of the Uprising was interpreted as the consequence of weak centralization and a lack of obedience to party-oriented structures and evidence that these must be increased.

Sections of the middle class saw in the Uprising their fears of a Bolshevik Revolution confirmed and became more attracted to anti-communist politics. As a result, in the 1924 Hamburg Reichstag election, the German National People's Party saw their share of the votes rise from 12% to about 20%, though it quickly dropped back to around 12% in 1928.

== Films ==
- Der Hamburger Aufstand Oktober 1923. Documentary, Federal Republic of Germany, (1971) 41 Min., Written by Reiner Etz, Gisela Tuchtenhagen, Klaus Wildenhahn; Director: Klaus Wildenhahn. Produced by the German Film and Television Academy Berlin and NDR (Hamburg)
- Ernst Thälmann – Sohn seiner Klasse. Drama, German Democratic Republic (1954) Director: Kurt Maetzig

== Bibliography ==
- Bernhard H. Bayerlein, Leonid G. Babicenko (Eds.): Deutscher Oktober 1923. Ein Revolutionsplan und sein Scheitern, Berlin (2003). (Archive des Kommunismus – Pfade des XX. Jahrhunderts. 3) ISBN 3-351-02557-2 (in German)
- Sergej Tretjakow: Hörst Du, Moskau. Drama about the Hamburg Uprising. Moscow (1923) (in German)
- Angelika Voß: Der „Hamburger Aufstand“ im Oktober 1923. In: Angelika Voß, Ursula Büttner, Hermann Weber: Vom Hamburger Aufstand zur politischen Isolierung. Kommunistische Politik 1923–1933 in Hamburg und im Deutschen Reich, Hamburg (1983), pp. 9–54 (in German)
- Louis Biester (postum): Der Kommunistenputsch 1923. In: Jahrbuch für den Kreis Stormarn (1985), pp. 73–76 (in German)
- Stadtteilkollektiv Rotes Winterhude: Der Hamburger Aufstand – Verlauf – Mythos – Lehren. Hamburg (2003) (in German)
- Berlin, Jörg: "Staatshüter und Revolutionsverfechter. Arbeiterparteien in der Nachkriegszeit"; in: Ulrich Bauche (Ed.): Wir sind die Kraft. Arbeiterbewegung in Hamburg von den Anfängen bis 1945; Exhibition catalogue, Museum für Hamburgische Geschichte, VSA Hamburg (1983) pp. 103–131. ISBN 3-87975-355-5 (in German)
- Lothar Danner: Ordnungspolizei Hamburg. Betrachtungen zu ihrer Geschichte 1918–1933, Hamburg (1958) (in German)
- Lemmons, Russel (2013). Hitler's Rival: Ernst Thälmann in Myth and Memory. Lexington, Kentucky: The University Press of Kentucky. ISBN 978-0-8131-4090-2.

== See also ==
- Ernst Thälmann
- Spartacist uprising 1919
- Ruhr Uprising 1920
- Beer Hall Putsch
- Hamburgische Bürgerschaft
- 1923 in Germany
