= German October =

Attempted communist revolution in Germany in October 1923

- Part of the revolutions of 1917–1923 and political violence in Germany (1918–1933)
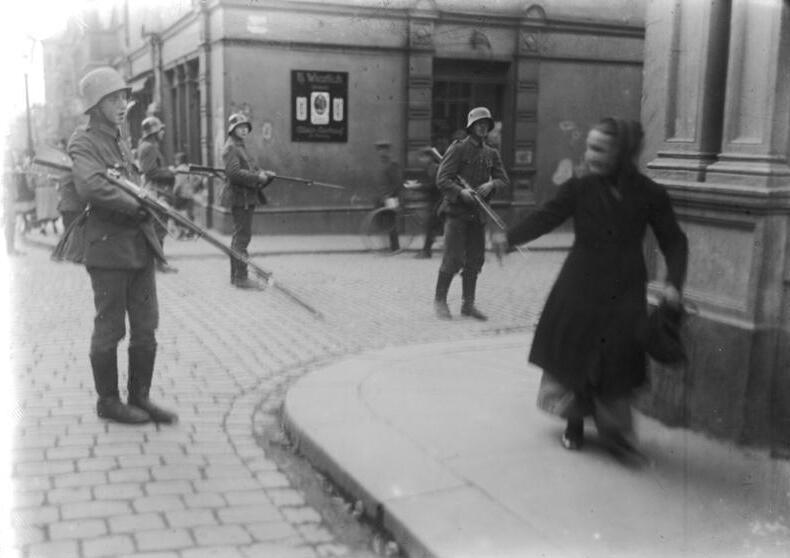
- Reichswehr in Saxony, October 1923
Date	10 October 1923–9 November 1923
Location	Weimar Republic
Result	Weimar Republic victory: Defeat of communist revolutionaries; Banning of the Proletarian Hundreds; Resignation of Prime Minister Erich Zeigner

Belligerents
Weimar Republic	Communist Party of Germany; Supported by: Soviet Union

Commanders and leaders
Friedrich Ebert; Arnold Diestel; Erich Zeigner	Hugo Urbahns; Hans Kippenberger; Albert Schreiner; Heinz Neumann; Ernst Thälmann; Manfred Stern

Units involved
Reichswehr; Local police	Proletarian Hundreds

The German October (German: Deutscher Oktober) was a plan of the Executive Committee of the Communist International (ECCI) to attempt a communist revolution in the Weimar Republic in October 1923, amidst acute political and economic crises in the country. The Communist Party of Germany (KPD), under the United Front strategy, was directed to enter into coalition governments with the Social Democratic Party of Germany (SPD) in the states of Thuringia and Saxony and utilize their resources to assist the revolution. Despite their efforts, the KPD and ECCI leadership found no support and the plan was called off on 21 October. However, local branches of the KPD in Hamburg and Bremen launched their own insurrections, which were suppressed by the local police.

The entry of the KPD into government in Saxony and Thuringia sparked a crisis in itself. The Reichswehr under Otto Gessler, with the support of the Stresemann cabinet and Reich President Friedrich Ebert, issued an ultimatum demanding the reorganisation of these governments to exclude the Communists. While the Thuringian government agreed, the Saxon government under Erich Zeigner refused, prompting Gessler to deploy the Reichswehr and appoint a Reichskommissar, who deposed Zeigner and occupied the state parliament. The crisis ended with the formation of a new SPD-only government two days later. Donald Pryce posits that the Reich cabinet did not see Saxony or the Communists as a serious threat, but agreed to depose the government in order to appease the Reichswehr and prevent a coup against Berlin assisted by the rogue Bavarian government.

== Background ==
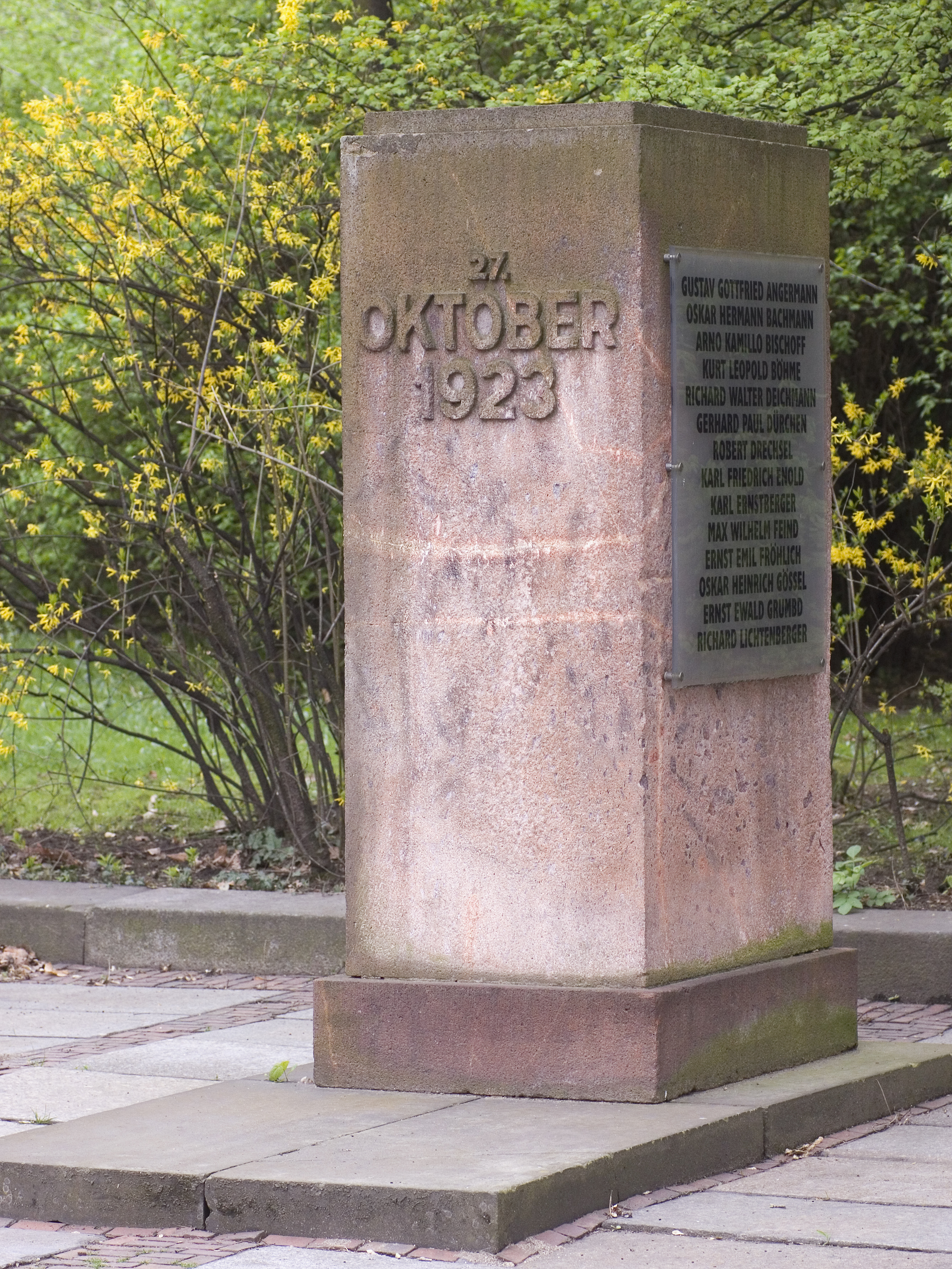
Platz der Oktoberopfer, Freiberg (Saxony), memorial for the demonstrators who were shot by the Reichswehr on October 27, 1923

The October events formed a part of the existential crisis of the Weimar Republic in 1923. Three major events in 1923, the occupation of the Ruhr, separatist unrest in the Rhineland and the Palatinate, and the danger of Hitler's far-right beer hall putsch in Bavaria spreading across the country put the Weimar Republic government under extreme pressure. In autumn 1923 the Weimar Republic found itself in political chaos. By the order of the Reich President Friedrich Ebert, a state of emergency was imposed in Germany on September 26, 1923.

=== Occupation of the Ruhr by the French and Belgians ===
Shortly after the Cuno government took office, Belgian and French troops marched into Germany on January 11, 1923, and occupied the Ruhr area. The reason was that Germany did not fulfill her reparations obligations under the Treaty of Versailles by failing to deliver sawn timber, telegraph poles and coal. France, hounded by its foreign creditors, was ready to use force to extract reparations from Germany. This approach was heavily criticized and, among other things, viewed as a policy "close to the edge of the war". France received no support from the Allies. But neither Washington nor London hurried to Germany's aid.

The response of the Cuno government was a policy of "passive resistance": "refusing follow the instructions of the occupiers." As part of the passive resistance, public moments of silence were held and the officials and employees of the Reichsbahn delayed the travel of the coal trains to the west. When this took effect, after a while the French troops began to seize and shut down mines and coking plants and to arrest people. They also took over the railway system. The Reich had to continue to pay the salaries of officials and employees of the Reichsbahn and also give the mining companies large loans so that they could pay the salaries of their workers. This intensified the economic hardship that resulted in the hyperinflation.

=== Countrywide strikes and left-wing paramilitaries in Saxony and Thuringia ===
At the same time there were strikes and unrest against the Reich government throughout the country, especially in Bavaria. The trade unions and workers' assemblies close to the KPD tried to instigate a general strike against the Cuno government. During this time the KPD was very influential in Saxony, where a social democratic minority government under Erich Zeigner ruled with parliamentary support from the KPD. One consequence was that the paramilitary proletarian hundreds were not banned there, but began in August 1923 to intensify their military exercises and to collect weapons. Moreover, in Thuringia with a social democratic minority government under August Frölich, the KPD was influential and its hundreds were not banned.

=== Separatists in the Rhineland and the Palatinate ===
Also in autumn 1923 there was separatist unrest in the Rhineland with the aim of founding a Rhenish Republic and breaking away from the German Reich. From October 21, 1923, the separatists brought some Rhenish city and community administrations (e.g. in Aachen, Koblenz, Bonn, Wiesbaden, Trier and Mainz) under their control, partly with the help of the Belgian and French occupation troops. On October 21 they proclaimed a "Rhenish Republic", on November 12 an "Autonomous Palatinate". Since no German military was allowed in the Rhineland according to the provisions of the Versailles Treaty, the Reich government could not use its military to end the uprising. The separatist control was initially recognized by France. The reason for this was that the French wanted to set up buffer states between France and Germany to ensure their future security. This approach was met with disapproval by the German, British and American governments, as well as resistance from the population and led to the end of the uprising by November 1923 after operations by Prussian police and auxiliaries as well as the withdrawal of the French support for the separatists.

== Attempt of a communist revolution in Germany ==
=== Decision in Moscow ===
The decision to attempt a communist revolution was made in Moscow. Numerous strikes against the right-wing government of Wilhelm Cuno (Cuno strikes) appeared to be the beginning of revolutionary events. The chairman of the Comintern Grigori Zinoviev instructed the KPD on August 15, 1923, to prepare for an approaching revolutionary crisis. Leon Trotsky expressly agreed to this. On August 23, 1923, there was a secret meeting of the Politburo of the Russian Communist Party. The Germany expert Karl Radek also advocated an aggressive approach there. Joseph Stalin was skeptical. The goal of the Soviet plan was that after a victory of the KPD, the highly industrialized "Soviet Germany" would support the economic development of the still predominantly agrarian Soviet Union. The seriously ill Vladimir Lenin no longer played a role. At the end of the meeting, a committee of four members of the Central Committee was formed and immediately sent to Germany for illegal work under false identities. The members were Radek, Józef Unszlicht, Vasily Schmidt and Georgy Pyatakov. Radek was supposed to influence the Central Committee of the KPD to follow the Moscow line, Schmidt was to act as the organizer of the revolutionary cells within the German trade unions, Pyatakov was responsible for general coordination and liaison with Moscow, and Unschlicht was responsible for paramilitary issues and for the formation of a German Cheka planned to operate after the coup. The Soviet ambassador in Berlin, Nikolay Krestinsky, was also supposed to unofficially support their underground work. He was responsible for the administration of the secret funds (400,000 US dollars) in preparation for the German October.

For the leadership in Moscow, the situation in Germany seemed comparable to that in Russia in the summer of 1917. The domestic and foreign political crisis in Germany had come to such a head in 1923 that a violent solution from the right or the left was seen as logical. For the communists it was clear that either they strike first or they will be preempted by the far-right. Radek pleaded for an early strike. Internal conflicts among the Soviet leadership also played a role here. As a supporter of Trotsky, Radek saw an opportunity to strengthen his position vis-à-vis Zinoviev and Stalin. It was hoped that a success in Germany would also have a positive effect on the mood in Russia. In September the Comintern finally decided in favor of the German October. Simultaneously, they also approved of a similar revolt and coup in Bulgaria, which unfolded as the September Uprising. On November 9, 1923, exactly five years after the German November Revolution of 1918, according to Trotsky's plans, the communist revolutionaries would launch their coup.

According to Russian historian Vadim Rogovin, the leadership of the German Communist party had requested that Moscow send Leon Trotsky to Germany to direct the 1923 insurrection. However, this proposal was rejected by the Politburo which was controlled by Stalin, Zinoviev and Kamenev who decided to send a commission of lower-ranking Russian Communist party members.

=== Role of the KPD ===
Heinrich Brandler, the chairman of the KPD, was initially skeptical, but was convinced of the plans. Brandler, who had warned against hasty steps in August, now turned around and painted the project's prospects for success in the rosiest of colors: 253,000 communists were ready to fight in proletarian hundreds; fifteen divisions could be formed from them in six to eight weeks. Weapons were available in sufficient numbers. The left-wing of the KPD, including Ruth Fischer and Ernst Thälmann, were ready to strike from the start. Only Arkadi Maslow from the Fischer group remained uncooperative despite Moscow's threats. Zinoviev viewed the participation of the KPD in the Saxon state government coalition as a prerequisite for action. Starting from this moment, in Saxony and Thuringia, 50,000 to 60,000 workers would be armed. Both states would be defended against the right-wing forces from Bavaria. The Reichswehr troops would be ignored.

== Events in Saxony, Thuringia, and Hamburg ==
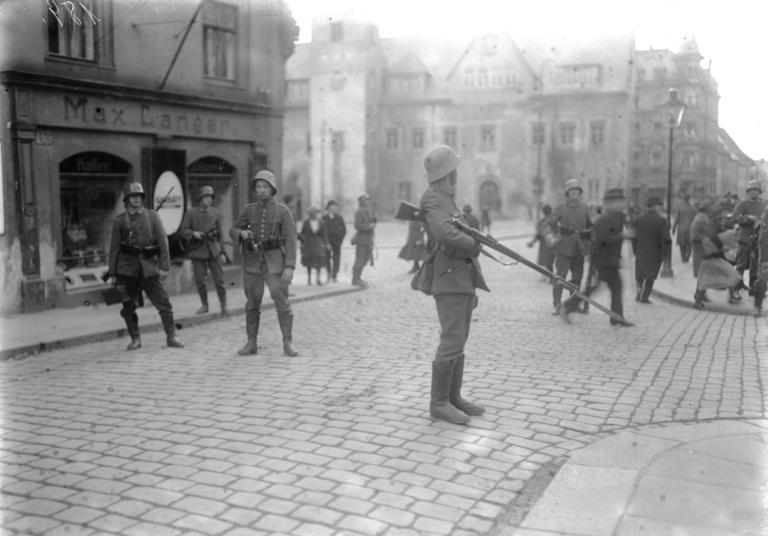
Reichswehr troops with fixed bayonets blocking off a street in Freiberg, Saxony.

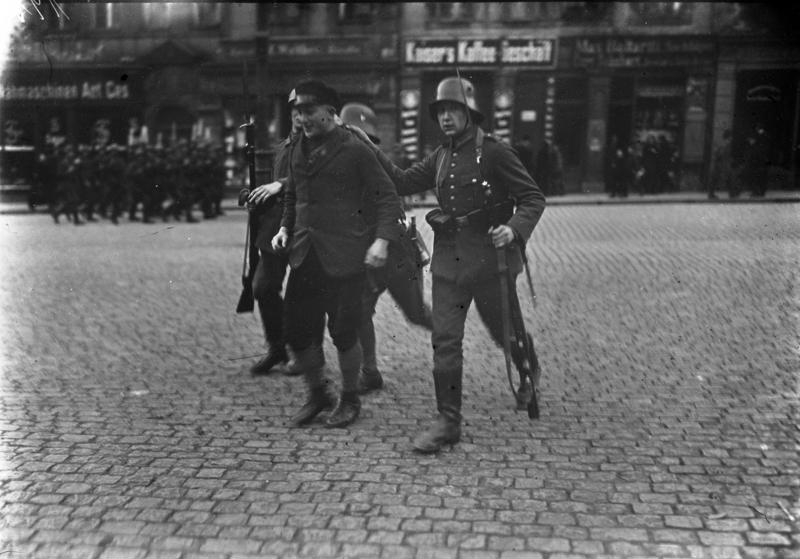
Arrest of a member of the proletarian hundreds by the Reichswehr troops.

Meanwhile, the domestic political situation in Germany worsened. The focal points were Saxony, Thuringia, and Hamburg.

On October 10, the KPD joined the Zeigner government in Saxony as planned. However, the Ministry of the Interior and thus the command of the police did not pass to the communists. Nevertheless, the communist chairman Heinrich Brandler took on an important role as head of the state chancellery.

On October 16, the KPD also joined the government in Thuringia. These actions were legal and the state governments did not take any insurrectionist measures. The situation was thus fundamentally different from that in Bavaria, where Gustav von Kahr and his right-wing extremists were planning a coup. In Berlin, however, no one doubted that communists entering the government was only a preliminary stage to an armed communist uprising.

Together with left-wing Social Democrats, the KPD put together combat units that were supposed to bring about the revolution. These were called "proletarian hundreds".

The social democrats in Saxony and Thuringia, who belonged to the left wing of the SPD, believed that a coalition with the Communists would, on the one hand, overcome the enmity between the two workers' parties; on the other hand, with the help of the "Proletarian Hundreds", they wanted to stop the "March on Berlin" feared in Bavaria in emulation of Mussolini's March on Rome. The social democrats did not realize the revolutionary intentions of the KPD, controlled from Moscow.

On October 13, the "proletarian hundreds" were banned by the commanding Lieutenant General in Saxony Alfred Müller, who had also held the executive power since September 27. On October 16, the Saxon police were directly subordinated to the Reich military. The state government was thus deprived of its law enforcement power and de facto already largely disempowered.

The possibility of a communist uprising remained real until October 21. The KPD had called for a workers' conference in Chemnitz on this day. If the mood of the meeting proved favorable, the general strike would be called and the uprising would begin. 450 workers' delegates - communists, trade unionists and some social democrats - assembled for the conference. Brandler did not meet with the approval of the assembly and the SPD threatened to end their coalition. August Thalheimer later described the events in Chemnitz with a view to the planned Red October as a "third class burial". In fact, the KPD and ECCI recognized that the communists were completely isolated even in Saxony. The uprising plan has been dropped. The Bulgarian revolt, which was supposed to act as a prelude to the events in Germany, had already failed after only a few days.

Only in Hamburg there was an uprising of proletarian paramilitaries between October 23 and 25, in which 24 communists and 17 policemen were killed. As planned, armed communists - around 300 men - raided 17 police stations to steal firearms and occupied public buildings. One of their leaders was Ernst Thalmann. However, the police were able to prevail within a few days. The origins of the uprising in Hamburg are unclear: either the activist KPD leadership in Hamburg wanted to force the more cautious party leadership in Berlin to strike or they were misinformed by their delegates, who only arrived in Chemnitz after the conference.

In Saxony, the Reichswehr used force against the communists. Between October 21 and 27 the Reichswehr were shooting communists in various cities, there were many dead and wounded. The actions of the army took place without a formal decision by the federal government, but on behalf of the Reich President Friedrich Ebert. After Zeigner's refusal to form a government without communists, a formal Reichsexekution according to Article 48 of the Weimar Constitution took place on October 29. The Saxon state government under the Social Democratic Prime Minister Erich Zeigner was de facto removed from office by the Reich President Ebert on the basis of these emergency decrees. The Thuringian cabinet dissolved voluntarily in view of this development.

The former Minister of Justice Rudolf Heinze was appointed Reichskommissar for Saxony by the Reich government, and the previous Saxon state ministers were removed from their offices by the Reichswehr. On October 30, Prime Minister Erich Zeigner formally resigned in favor of Alfred Fellisch as head of a pure SPD cabinet, which also ended Heinze's mandate as Reichskomissar.

== Reaction in Moscow ==
Moscow was looking for a scapegoat for the October disaster. He was found quickly. In a "closed letter" dated November 5, the ECCI accused the KPD leadership of deliberately misrepresenting the situation in Germany. The trio at the head of the Soviet Communist Party (Stalin, Zinoviev, Kamenev) by attacking the "right-wing" Brandler group in the KPD were able to also strike against Trotsky and his supporters at the same time. The dispute over the causes of the October defeat was thus linked to the factional struggles in the Soviet leadership, from which Stalin emerged victorious.

== Historical assessment of the German October ==
The Beer Hall Putsch is not historically considered a part of the German October although it was initiated at the same time and failed in November 1923. Thus, a coup on November 9, 1923, was planned not only by the KPD but also by the far-right national camp with the Munich beer hall putschist Adolf Hitler and the World War I general Erich Ludendorff at the helm.

The causal connections between the events only became fully clear long after, because the archives in Moscow - and the corresponding secret protocols - are only now accessible to historians. The most extensive description of this can be found in "Deutscher Oktober 1923. Ein Revolutionsplan und sein Scheitern." (2003).

In summary, the combination of the wrong decisions by the French and the Soviets, the disastrous economic and political situation in Germany after the lost world war, the consequences of the treaty of Versailles as well as coup attempts by politically extreme groups from the left and right were responsible for the difficult situation of the Reich government in 1923. The "German October" had to be broken off prematurely in Saxony and Thuringia, the "March on Berlin" did not even get beyond Munich, and Rhenish separatism collapsed miserably, not only because the attempts were amateurish, but above all because a "dictatorship of the proletariat" based on the Soviet model, a "Führer state" based on the Italian model or the destruction of the country's unity were only considered desirable by a small minority of the population.

In the years from 1924 to 1929, Germany experienced a period of relative stability, economic recovery and foreign policy success.

== Sources ==
- Boris Bazhanov: Stalin – Der rote Diktator. Berlin 1931 (p. 122–131 – a source for the decisive politburo meeting August 23, 1923, which agreed on the uprising; pushing for it were Zinoviev, Radek, and Trotsky) New edition: Bazhanov, Boris: Ich war Stalins Sekretär, Frankfurt 1977, Ullstein
- Bernhard H. Bayerlein, Leonid G. Babicenko u. a. (Hrsg.): Deutscher Oktober 1923. Ein Revolutionsplan und sein Scheitern (= Archive des Kommunismus – Pfade des XX. Jahrhunderts. Band 3). Aufbau-Verlag, Berlin 2003, ISBN 3-351-02557-2. (comprehensive source. 479 pages)
- Frank Hirschinger: "Gestapoagenten, Trotzkisten, Verräter". Kommunistische Parteisäuberungen in Sachsen-Anhalt 1918–1953. Vandenhoeck & Ruprecht, Göttingen 2005, ISBN 3-525-36903-4, S. 37–52 (abridged online version at Google Books).
- Harald Jentsch: Die KPD und der "Deutsche Oktober" 1923. Ingo Koch Verlag, Rostock 2005, ISBN 3-938-68633-2.
- Carsten Voigt, Michael Rudloff: Die Reichsexekution gegen Sachsen 1923 und die Grenzen des Föderalismus. In: Michael Richter, Thomas Schaarschmidt, Mike Schmeitzner (Hrsg.): Länder, Gaue und Bezirke. Mitteldeutschland im 20. Jahrhundert. Mitteldeutscher Verlag, Halle/S. 2007, ISBN 3-89812-530-0, S. 53–72.
- Otto Wenzel: 1923 – die gescheiterte deutsche Oktoberrevolution (= Diktatur und Widerstand. Band 7). With the introduction by Manfred Wilke, Lit., Münster 2003, ISBN 3-8258-7246-7.
- Heinrich August Winkler: Weimar 1918–1933. Die Geschichte der ersten deutschen Demokratie. Verlag C. H. Beck, München 1998, ISBN 3-406-37646-0, S. 213–227.
- Троцкий, Л (1924). Уроки Октября (in Russian). Ленинград: Прибой.
- Фосколо, Мона (2013). Георги Димитров. Една критическа биография. София: Просвета. ISBN 978-954-01-2768-2.
