= Political violence in Germany (1918–1933) =

- Part of the interwar period
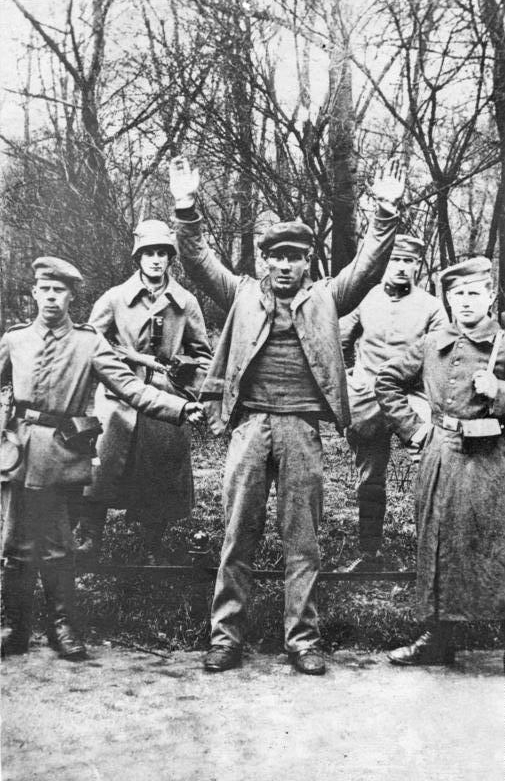
- Johann Lehner with government troops on 3 May 1919, moments before they murdered him, mistaking him for Bavarian Council Republic official Fritz Seidel
Date	29 October 1918 — 23 March 1933 (14 years, 4 months, 3 weeks and 2 days)
Location	Germany
Result	Nazi Party seizes power; All opposition political parties are banned; Third German Reich established

Belligerents
Weimar Republic: Reichswehr; Iron Front; Reichsbanner; Social Democratic Party	Far-left: Communist Party; Red Front Fighters League; Anti-fascist Action; Spartacus League; Workers and soldiers councils; Free Workers' Union; Black Band	Far-right: German National People's Party; Der Stahlhelm; Freikorps; Organisation Consul; Viking League; Nazi Party

Commanders and leaders
Friedrich Ebert; Paul von Hindenburg	Rosa Luxemburg (executed); Karl Liebknecht (executed); Karl Radek; Ernst Thälmann; Wilhelm Pieck; Richard Müller; Kurt Eisner †; Ernst Toller; Eugen Leviné (executed); Erich Mühsam	Erich Ludendorff; Walther von Lüttwitz; Hermann Ehrhardt; Adolf Hitler; Ernst Röhm

Germany saw significant political violence from the fall of the Empire and the rise of the Republic through the German Revolution of 1918–1919, until the rise of the Nazi Party to power with 1933 elections and the proclamation of the Enabling Act of 1933 that fully broke down all opposition. The violence was characterised by assassinations and by confrontations between left-wing groups such as the Communist Party of Germany and right-wing groups such as the Freikorps.

Between 1919 and 1922, historians have attributed at least 354 politically motivated murders to right-wing extremists, primarily Freikorps members, and at least 22 to left-wing extremists. During the same period, those convicted of left-wing political murders were more frequently prosecuted and generally received harsher sentences than those convicted of right-wing political murders.

== Incidents of violent unrest in Weimar Republic ==
- German Revolution of 1918–1919 (1918-1919)
  - Kiel mutiny (1918)
  - Christmas crisis (1918)
  - November 1918 insurgency in Alsace–Lorraine (1918)
  - Spartacist uprising (1919)
  - Berlin March Battles (1919)
- Greater Poland uprising (1918-1919)
- Silesian Uprisings (1919-1921)
- Reichstag Bloodbath (1920)
- Kapp-Lüttwitz Putsch (1920)
- Ruhr uprising (1920)
- Feme murders (1920-1923)
- March Action (1921)
- Klaipėda Revolt (1923)
- Cuno strikes (1923)
- Küstrin Putsch (1923)
- German October (1923)
- Hamburg Uprising (1923)
- Beer Hall Putsch (1923)
- Blutmai (1929)
- Stennes revolt (1931-1932)
- Murder of Paul Anlauf and Franz Lenck (1931)
- Potempa murder of 1932 (1932)
- Kwami Affair (1932)
- 1932 Berlin transport strike (1932)
- Altona Bloody Sunday (1932)
- 1932 Prussian coup d'état (1932)
- Reichstag fire (1933)

== See also ==
- Adolf Hitler's rise to power
- Law for the Protection of the Republic
- Occupation of the Ruhr
- Occupation of the Rhineland
- Kurt Eisner § Death and legacy
- Walther Rathenau § Assassination and aftermath
- Matthias Erzberger § Assassination
- Weimar paramilitary groups
- Fascist and anti-Fascist violence in Italy (1919–1926)
- Political violence in Finland (1918–1932)
