= Manfred Stern =

Soviet general and spy (1896–1954)

- Nicknames: "General Kléber" "Savior of Madrid"
- Born: January 1896; Duchy of Bukovina, Austria-Hungary (modern day Chernivtsi Oblast, Ukraine)
- Died: 18 February 1954 (aged 58) Ozerlag labor camp, Soviet Union
- Allegiance: Austria-Hungary (1914-1917); Russian SFSR (1917-1921); Far Eastern Republic (1921-1922); Soviet Union (1922-1939); Jiangxi Soviet (1932-1935); Second Spanish Republic (1936-1938)
- Branch: Austro-Hungarian Army (1914-1917); Soviet Red Army (1917-1924); GRU (1924-1939); Chinese Red Army (1932-1935); Spanish Republican Army (1936-1938)
- Service years: 1914-1939
- Conflicts: World War One; Russian Civil War; German October; Hamburg Uprising; Chinese Civil War; Spanish Civil War

Manfred (Moses) Stern (Russian: Манфред (Мойше) Штерн; also known as Emilio Kléber, Lazar Stern, Moishe Stern, Mark Zilbert; 1896–1954) was a member of the GRU, Soviet military intelligence. He served as a spy in the United States, as a military advisor in China, and gained fame under his nom de guerre as General Kléber, leader of the International Brigade during the Spanish Civil War.

== Early life ==
Stern was born into a Jewish family in present-day Chernivtsi Raion, Chernivtsi Oblast, in western Ukraine on the border with Romania, which was at the time in the Duchy of Bukovina, a province of Austria-Hungary. He studied medicine at the University of Vienna.

== World War I and the Russian Revolution ==
Drafted into the Austro-Hungarian Army at the beginning of World War I, he was captured by the Tsarist forces and taken to a prisoner of war camp in Siberia. Freed after the 1917 October Revolution, he became a Bolshevik and joined the Red Army. He then led a partisan unit in Siberia against the White Army of Admiral Alexander Kolchak and fought in Mongolia against the warlord Roman von Ungern-Sternberg and his ally, the religious leader Bogd Khan. In 1921 he was elected to the Constituent Assembly of the short-lived Far Eastern Republic.

After the end of the Russian Civil War in 1922 he returned to Moscow and enrolled at the Military Academy. Upon graduation, in 1924, he joined Walter Krivitsky (also a Jew from Galicia) in the Red Army's Fourth Department, which was in charge of military intelligence (and which later evolved into GRU). Stern was initially assigned to the Comintern and acted as an instructor in its military schools.

In 1923, Stern, acting in the role of military advisor to Albert Schreiner was responsible for suggesting to Schreiner that Hamburg could be used as the first staging post for the communist insurrection.

== Espionage career ==
In 1929, Stern became the GRU's chief spy in the United States. Based in New York City and operating under the cover name of Mark Zilbert, he managed a network of sources and agents involved in the theft of military secrets. In one operation they stole the plans for a new American tank. Another operation was foiled by a source who went to the American Naval Intelligence and then continued to deliver fake documents to the Soviets.

The New York spy cell operated a safe apartment on West 57th Street, owned by Paula Levine, later part of a Soviet spy ring in Paris, and kept a photographic studio on Gay Street in Greenwich Village. There "Charlie," in actuality Leon Minster, GRU operator of a front, the Ellem Radio Equipment Shop, microfilmed the stolen documents. German sailors acted as couriers to the GRU in Europe. (These details come from Witness, the 1952 memoir of Whittaker Chambers.)

== Military advisor in China ==
After handing off to Alexander Ulanovsky in New York, Stern traveled in 1932 to Shanghai where he served as the Comintern's military advisor to the newly created Jiangxi Soviet. Stern's activities in China remain veiled in mystery. In a report to the Moscow Comintern, he claimed that he tried to forge an alliance between the Chinese Red Army and a rebel Nationalist army whose officers had seized control of nearby Fukien province. However, this alliance failed and the National Revolutionary Army, under the command of Chiang Kai-shek, encircled the Chinese Red Army, forcing them to abandon their base in Jiangxi and to begin the Long March.

Stern returned to Moscow in 1935 and worked briefly for Otto Kuusinen in the secretariat of the Executive Committee of the Comintern (ECCI).

== "General Kléber" and the Spanish Civil War ==
Stern arrived in Spain on a hot day in September 1936, disguised inappropriately as a "furrier." He adopted the name of one of Napoleon's generals, Jean-Baptiste Kléber, and posed as an Austrian-born Canadian citizen. He served as a military advisor to the International Brigades against Franco's rebel army.

During the Battle of Madrid in November 1936, he led the 3,000 member XI International Brigade. At a time when it appeared all was lost —the Republican government of Largo Caballero had already abandoned the capital— the arrival of Kléber and the International Brigade boosted the morale of Madrid's Republican defenders when the loyalist troops fought from street to street and held the line at Casa de Campo, repulsing the Nationalists. Soviet propaganda broadcast the 'Victory over Fascism' throughout the world and —despite General Miaja's and General Vicente Rojo's crucial role— heralded General Kléber as the "Savior of Madrid".

The New York Times correspondent Herbert Matthews interviewed Stern shortly after the battle. "Listening to General Kléber," he wrote, "one gets the impression of great dynamic force. He is a character possibly destined to play a great part in the troubled years which face the world... In thinking about him it is hard not to ponder on the ironical fact that Hitler is not the only native of Austria who is playing a great part in the Spanish Civil War."

In 1937 he led the newly established 45th Division, but a leadership dispute caused Kléber to be replaced by Hans Kahle as leader of the Republican Infantry division. Even so, Stern remained in Spain as liaison agent with the Republican Government and still enjoyed military prestige among members of the Communist Party of Spain. He left Spain when the International Brigades were withdrawn in October 1938.

== Recall to Moscow, imprisonment, and death ==
The NKVD chief in Spain, Alexander Orlov, knew that Stern's recall meant certain imprisonment and death because in Moscow Joseph Stalin and Nikolai Yezhov were busy purging the Red Army. He offered to employ Stern as a member of the NKVD. While awaiting orders, Stern spent his final months in Spain relaxing at a small orange plantation and entertaining his young Spanish mistress. Kliment Voroshilov denied his transfer and ordered his return to Moscow.

In May 1939 a Military Collegium condemned Stern to fifteen years of hard labor. He became a nonperson. His name was deliberately withheld from official Soviet histories of the Spanish Civil War. The remaining years of his life were spent in the Gulag and he died of exhaustion at the Ozerlag labor camp on February 18, 1954.

== See also ==
- Otto Braun (communist)

== Sources ==
- Brun-Zechowoj, Walerij (2000). Manfred Stern - General Kleber. Die tragische Biographie eines Berufsrevolutionärs (1896–1954) (in German). Berlin: Wolfgang Weist. ISBN 3-89626-175-4.
- Dallin, David (1955). Soviet Espionage. Yale University Press. OCLC 1081880.
- Eastman, Lloyd (1990). The Abortive Revolution: China under Nationalist Rule, 1927–1937. Harvard University Press. ISBN 0-674-00176-1.
- Matthews, Herbert L. (December 12, 1936). "Canadian Leader Praises Spaniards". New York Times.
- Orlov, Alexander (2004). March of Time. St. Ermin's Press. ISBN 1-903608-05-8.
