= 1905 (book) =

1908 book by Leon Trotsky

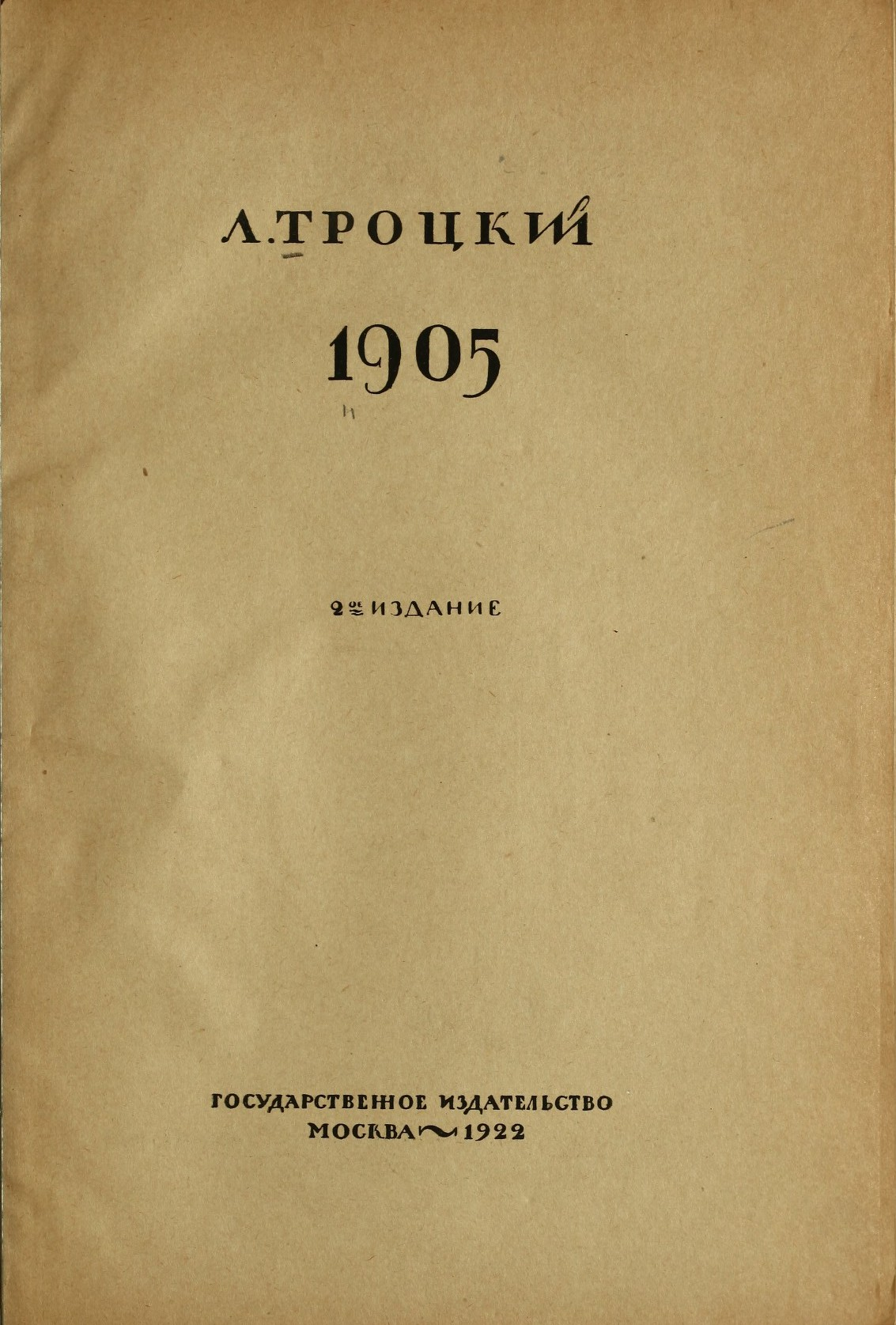
- Title page of second edition
- Author: Leon Trotsky
- Original title: 1905
- Translator: Anya Bostock (English)
- Language: Russian
- Genre: Nonfiction
- Publisher: Penguin Books (England)
- Publication date: 1908
- Publication place: Soviet Union
- Media type: Print

1905 is a historical account of the First Russian Revolution written by Soviet leader, Leon Trotsky. The book surveyed a number of historical developments in Tsarist Russia such as the emergence of Russian capitalism, the relationship of social democracy with the political parties and the significance of the Soviet worker's deputies.

== Background ==
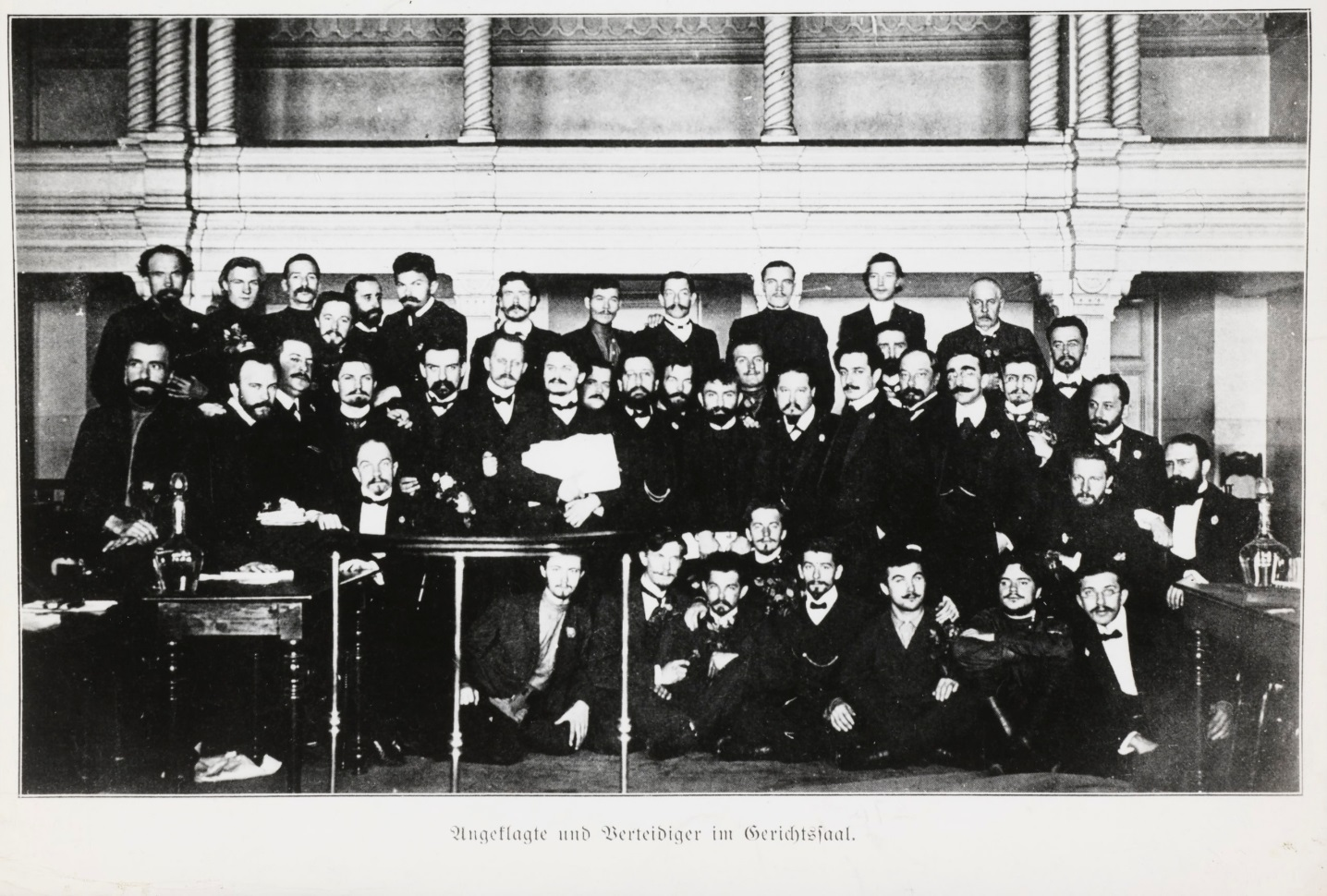
The Soviet of Workers' Deputies of St. Petersburg in 1905, Trotsky in the center. The soviets were an early example of a workers council.

Trotsky had assumed a central role in the 1905 revolution and served as the Chairman of the Petersburg Soviet of Workers' Delegates in which he wrote several proclamations urging for improved economic conditions, political rights and the use of strike action against the Tsarist regime on behalf of workers. Old Bolshevik Anatoly Lunacharsky viewed Trotsky as the best prepared among the Social-Democratic leaders during the 1905–07 revolution and stated that he "emerged from the revolution having acquired an enormous degree of popularity, whereas neither Lenin nor Martov had effectively gained any at all". In the aftermath of the forestalled revolution, the Tsarist police arrested him in December 1905. After again escaping Tsarist Russia for continental Europe, for a decade Trotsky politically transitioned from supporting the Menshevik wing of the RSDLP to advocating for the unity of the warring factions in 1913 with the establishment of the Mezhraiontsy, the Interdistrict Organization of United Social Democrats.

== Historical evaluation ==
The book has been commended for its historical value in chronicling the political developments and weight of social forces in the 1905 revolution. Historian, Ian Thatcher wrote that Trotsky established himself as a historian of the Russian Revolution with the book and the themes featured in 1905 would later be re-examined in his magnum opus, The History of the Russian Revolution. Notwithstanding, other reviewers have noted that the book was not written to provide a balanced or definitive overview of the period as the focus of the book is centred on St.Petersburg and from the perspective of Trotsky on events.
