= History of the Russian Revolution =

1930 book by Leon Trotsky

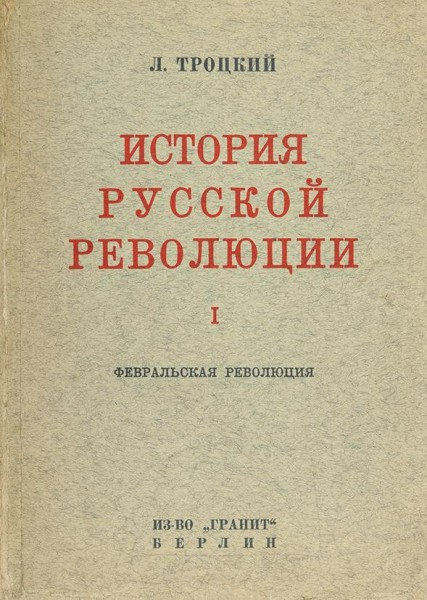
- First edition
- Author: Leon Trotsky
- Original title: История русской революции
- Translator: Max Eastman
- Language: Russian
- Genre: History
- Publication date: 1930
- Media type: Print (Hardcover, Paperback)
- Pages: 1040
- ISBN: 0-913460-83-4

History of the Russian Revolution is a three-volume book by Leon Trotsky on the Russian Revolution of 1917. The first volume is dedicated to the political history of the February Revolution and the October Revolution, to explain the relations between these two events. The book was initially published in Germany in 1930. It was originally published in Russian, but it was translated into English by Max Eastman in 1932. The English translation of the second volume, originally consisting of two parts, is split into two volumes. The book was considered anti-Stalinist in the Soviet Union and was not published in Russia until 1997.

== Concept and creation ==
Leon Trotsky was a leading figure in the Bolshevik Revolution in Russia in October 1917. He was expelled from the party and exiled by Joseph Stalin. In January 1929, he was banished from the Soviet Union. During his exile period in Turkey, Trotsky wrote this book on the isle of Prinkipo.

The History of Russian Revolution tells the story of the February and October revolutions in Russia which took place in 1917. This book is important due to it being an account of a major historical event by a participant and theorist. When speaking of himself, Trotsky writes in the third person in order to avoid subjectivism stating that: "the subjective tone, inevitable in autobiographies or memoirs, is not permissible in a work of history." It is considered an important and unique work as a history of a major event written by someone who took a leading role in it.

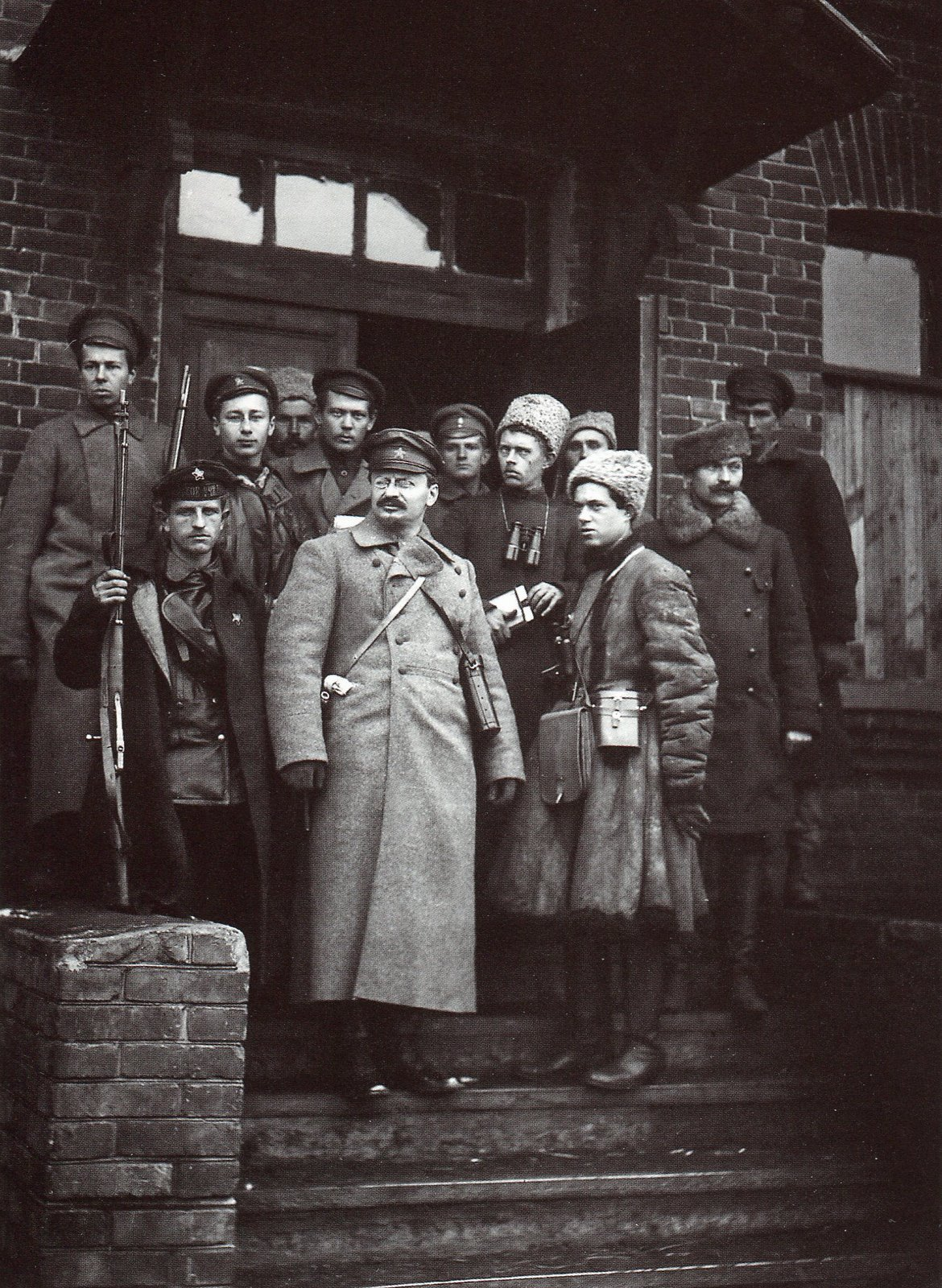
Leon Trotsky in 1918

The book is divided into three volumes:

- Volume I: The Overthrow of Tzarism
- Volume II: The Attempted Counter-Revolution
- Volume III: The Triumph of the Soviets

=== The Overthrow of Tzarism ===
This volume deals with the overthrow of tsarism in the February Revolution and the Provisional Government's attempts at ruling the country.

The first volume explains the historical reasons why the democratic regime that replaced tsarism "proved wholly non-viable."

=== The Attempted Counter-Revolution ===
This volume covers the period from the July Days to the last coalition of the Provisional Government in September.

=== The Triumph of the Soviets ===
Volume three deals with the national question, the preparation of power, and finally, the October insurrection.

== Publication ==
The basic motivation of Trotsky behind writing this piece was to translate the experience of the revolution into both a teaching tool and a weapon in the revolution. Isaac Deutscher, Trotsky's biographer, described The History of the Russian Revolution as Trotsky's

Crowning work, both in scale and power and as the fullest expression of his ideas on revolution." Trotsky himself says "The history of a revolution, like every other history, ought first of all to tell what happened and how. That however is, little enough. From the very telling it ought to become clear why it happened thus and not otherwise.

In his note about the author in the first English translation, Eastman wrote:

this present work [...] will take its place in the record of Trotsky's life [...] as one of the supreme achievements of this versatile and powerful mind and will.

In 2017, on the centennial of the Russian Revolution, writer Tariq Ali reviewed the book and wrote:

This passionate, partisan, and beautifully written account by a major participant in the revolution, written during his exile on the isle of Prinkipo in Turkey, remains one of the best accounts of 1917. No counter-revolutionary, conservative or liberal, has been able to compete with this telling.

== See also ==
- Bibliography of the Russian Revolution and Civil War
- Leon Trotsky bibliography
- 1905 (book)
