= Cuno strikes =

German national strike against the government of Wilhem Cuno

- Part of Political violence in Germany (1918–33) and Revolutions of 1917–1923
- Date: August 1923
- Location: Berlin, Germany
- Methods: Wildcat strike
- Result: Protests and strikes spread throughout Germany; Cuno government resigns

Parties
Striking workers Supported by: Communist Party of Germany; Allgemeiner Deutscher Gewerkschaftsbund	Weimar Republic

Number
3,500,000	Unknown

The Cuno strikes were a nationwide wave of strikes in Germany against the government of Chancellor Wilhelm Cuno in August 1923. The strikes were called by the Communist Party of Germany in response to Cuno's policy of passive resistance against the French and Belgian occupation of the Ruhr and the hyperinflation that resulted from it. The strikers demanded the resignation of the Cuno government, which occurred on 12 August 1923 after the Social Democratic Party called a vote of no confidence in the Reichstag. The strikes also buoyed the hopes of the Communist International of an imminent revolution, but they led only to an uprising in Hamburg that was quickly suppressed.

== Background ==
In January 1923, French and Belgian troops occupied the Ruhr district of Germany in response to shortfalls in German war reparations payments. The Cuno government reacted with a policy of passive resistance, which, combined with acts of civil disobedience, brought Germany's Ruhr industrial heartland almost to a stop. The government underwrote the costs of idled factories and mines and paid the workers who were affected by the shutdowns. Unable to meet the enormous expenses in any other way, the government resorted to printing money, sending already high inflation racing out of control. In 1923 Germany's currency, the Papiermark, fell from 17,000 to the US dollar at the beginning of the year to 4.2 trillion at the end.

For German society, the result was disastrous. People rushed to make purchases before their money lost its value, and those who had savings saw them evaporate almost overnight. Anger rose against both the German government and the French occupation forces.

== Strikes ==
A labour dispute in the Berlin printing industry triggered a strike on 10 August 1923. At the instigation of the Communist Party (KPD), it expanded to include the government printing plant. The shutdown of the banknote presses led to an immediate shortage of paper money. The KPD also convinced workers from power stations, construction, public transportation and hospitals to join the strike. Among their other demands, the strikers called for the resignation of the Cuno government.

On 10 August 1923, a conference of trade unions rejected the call for a three-day general strike made by Ruth Fischer, the chair of the Berlin KPD. The vote came after Otto Wels, leader of the Social Democratic Party (SPD), announced a number of government measures to improve the food supply and stabilize the currency. The next day, the KPD, unwilling to accept the defeat, held a meeting of all the revolutionary works councils in Greater Berlin. It called a general strike to bring down the Cuno government but was hindered from publicizing the call widely because the KPD's newspaper, Die Rote Fahne, had been banned the day before by an emergency presidential order.

The strikes, supported by some in the SPD, nevertheless spread from Berlin to other cities and regions including Hamburg, Lusatia, Saxony Province as well as the states of Saxony and Thuringia. Factories were occupied by communist workers, and factory managers fled. In the Ruhr Region, there was passive resistance rather than strikes.

== Resignation of government ==
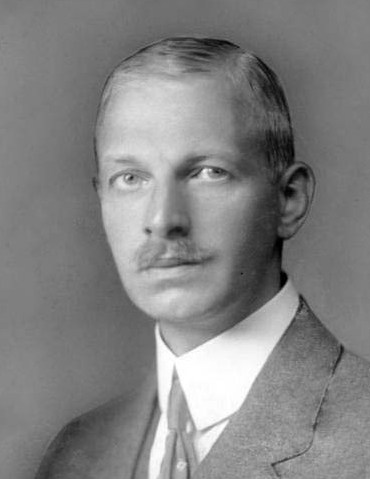
Chancellor Wilhelm Cuno, who was forced to resign due in part to the strikes that bore his name

In total, three-and-a-half million workers went on strike, indirectly forcing Cuno and his cabinet to resign. In addition to the pressure from the strikes, the SPD introduced a vote of no confidence in the Reichstag against the Cuno government, which resigned on 12 August. With the change in government, the strikes soon ended.

The SPD, pushed by its base and looking to avert worse social unrest or possibly revolution, saw no other political alternative than to join a grand coalition led by Gustav Stresemann of the German People's Party. The move resolved the crisis within the framework of the parliamentary system and left the KPD unable to turn it into a revolutionary upheaval.

== Soviet call for revolution ==
In Moscow, the Cuno strikes nurtured the hope of a German revolution. Leon Trotsky and other Influential members of the Soviet Politburo and the Comintern believed Germany was ready for revolution, but Heinrich Brandler, the head of the KPD, felt that the timing was premature. Despite Brandler's misgivings, on 23 August 1923 the Soviet Politburo adopted a plan for a "German October", but the attempted coup was cancelled at the last minute. Word of the cancellation did not reach Hamburg in time (or was possibly ignored by the local KPD leadership). The insurrection that took place there was quickly put down by government forces.

== Sources ==
- Heinrich August Winkler: Germany: The Long Road West. Vol. 1: 1789-1933. Oxford University Press, Oxford (2006) ISBN 978-0-19-926597-8
