= Occupation of the Ruhr =

1923–1925 occupation of Germany's Ruhr district

- Part of the aftermath of World War I and political violence in Germany (1918–1933)
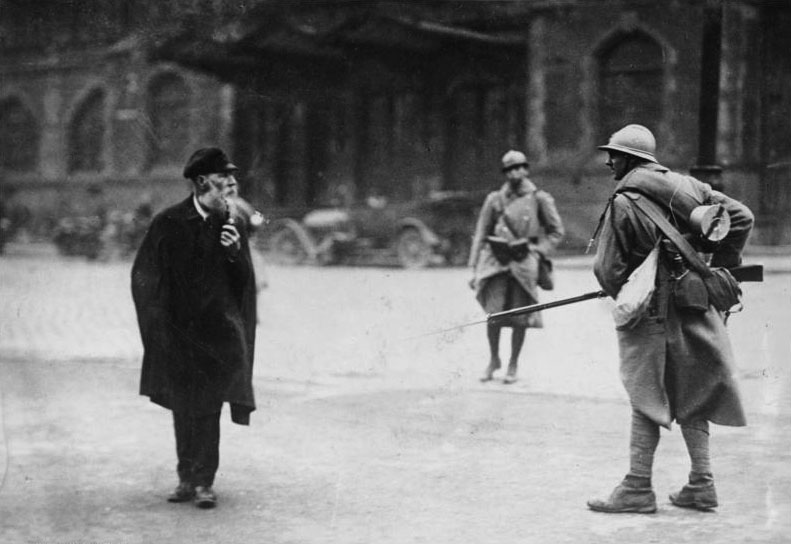
- Two French soldiers and a German civilian in the Ruhr in 1923
Date	January 11, 1923 – August 25, 1925 (2 years, 7 months, and 2 weeks)
Location	Ruhr, Germany
Result	Dawes Plan

Belligerents
France; Belgium	Weimar Republic German protesters

Commanders and leaders
(French Third Republic) Raymond Poincaré; (French Third Republic) Alphonse Caron; (French Third Republic) Jean Degoutte; (Belgium) Albert I; (Belgium) Georges Theunis; (Belgium) Louis Ruquoy	(Weimar Republic) Friedrich Ebert; (Weimar Republic) Wilhelm Cuno; (Weimar Republic) Wilhelm Marx; (Weimar Republic) Hans von Seeckt

Casualties and losses
Belgium: 11 soldiers killed 10 soldiers injured	137 civilians killed (est.); 600 civilians injured

The occupation of the Ruhr (German: Ruhrbesetzung) was the period from 11 January 1923 to 25 August 1925 when French and Belgian troops occupied the Ruhr region of Germany.

The occupation of the heavily industrialized Ruhr district came in response to Germany's repeated defaults on the reparations payments required under the terms of the Treaty of Versailles. The French and Belgians intended to force Germany to supply the coal and other raw materials that were part of the reparations. With the support of the German government, civilians in the area engaged in passive resistance and civil disobedience which largely shut down the economy of the region. Acts of sabotage and retaliation took place as well. An estimated 137 civilians were killed and 600 injured during the occupation.

The ongoing economic crisis in Germany worsened considerably as a result of the occupation. The government paid for its support of idled workers and businesses primarily by printing paper money. This contributed to the hyperinflation that brought major hardships to Germans across the country. After Germany stabilized its currency in late 1923, France and Belgium, facing economic and international pressures of their own, accepted the 1924 Dawes Plan drawn up by an international team of experts. It restructured and lowered Germany's war reparations payments and led to France and Belgium withdrawing their troops from the Ruhr by August 1925.

The occupation of the Ruhr contributed to the growth of radical right-wing movements in Germany. Adolf Hitler and the Nazi Party used the occupation as part of their justification for the Beer Hall Putsch of November 1923, which brought them wide public attention for the first time.

== Background ==
Under the terms of the Treaty of Versailles (1919) which formally ended World War I, the west bank of the river Rhine was occupied by the Allies, and the east bank within 50 kilometres of the river – which included the Ruhr – was demilitarized (Article 42). In addition, Germany was forced to accept responsibility for the damages caused in the war and was obliged to pay reparations to the Allies. Since the war in the west was fought predominantly on French soil, the bulk of the reparations were owed to France. The total sum demanded from Germany – 226 billion gold marks (US $913 billion in 2025) – was determined by the Inter-Allied Reparation Commission. In 1921, the amount was reduced to 132 billion (at that time US $31.4 billion; US $448 billion in 2025). Since part of the payments were in raw materials, some German factories ran short and the German economy suffered, further damaging the country's ability to pay. France was also suffering from a high deficit accrued during World War I, which resulted in a depreciation of the French franc. France increasingly looked towards German reparations payments as a way to stabilize its economy.

Due to delays in reparations deliveries, French and Belgian troops, with British approval, occupied Duisburg and Düsseldorf in the demilitarized zone of the Rhineland on 8 March 1921. In the London ultimatum of 5 May 1921, the Allies attempted to enforce their payment plan for 132 billion gold marks by threatening to occupy the Ruhr if Germany refused to accept the terms. The German government of Chancellor Joseph Wirth accepted the ultimatum on 11 May and began its "policy of fulfilment" (Erfüllungspolitik). By attempting to meet the payments, it intended to show the Allies that the demands were beyond Germany's economic means.

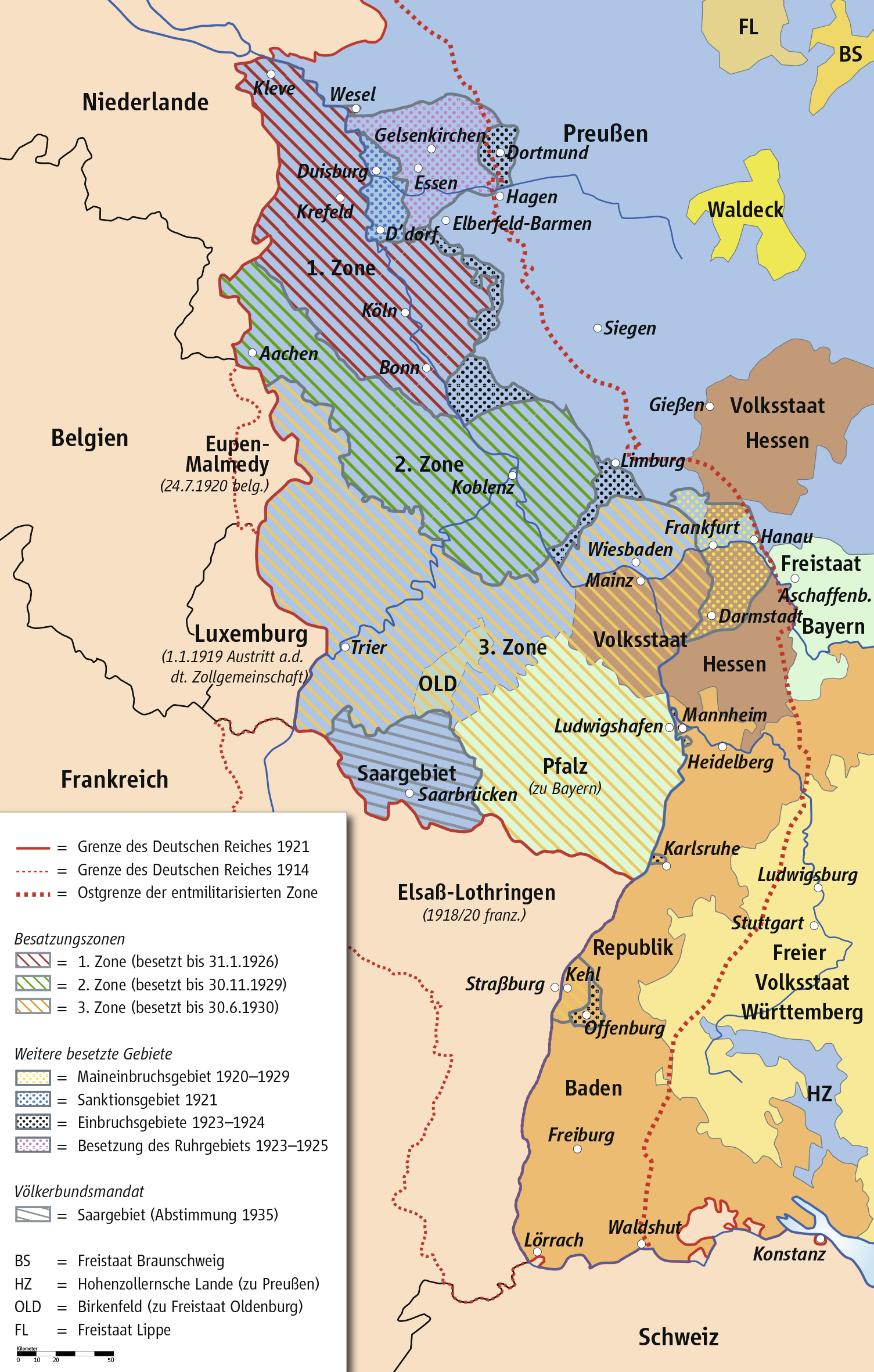
Map of the occupied Rhineland. In the north, the eastward-bulging area around Duisburg, Essen and Dortmund (dotted) largely corresponds to the Ruhr region that was occupied in 1923.

As a consequence of Germany's failure to make timber deliveries in December 1922, the Reparation Commission declared Germany in default. Particularly galling to the French was that the timber quota the Germans defaulted on was based on an assessment of capacity the Germans made themselves and subsequently lowered. The Allies believed that the government of Chancellor Wilhelm Cuno, who had succeeded Joseph Wirth in November 1922, had defaulted on the timber deliveries deliberately as a way of testing the will of the Allies to enforce the treaty. Raymond Poincaré, the French prime minister, hoped for joint Anglo-French economic sanctions against Germany but opposed military action. By December 1922, however, he saw coal for French steel production and payments in money as laid out in the Treaty of Versailles draining away. French and Belgian delegates on the Reparation Commission urged occupying the Ruhr as a way of forcing Germany to pay more, while the British delegate favoured lowering the payments. The conflict was brought to a head by a German default on coal deliveries in early January 1923, which was the thirty-fourth coal default in the previous thirty-six months. After much deliberation, Poincaré decided to occupy the Ruhr on 11 January 1923 in order to exact the reparations. Poincaré knew that it would cost France as well as Germany and told reporters on 29 January 1923:

Paralyzing the mining industry in the Ruhr may inflict hardships on France as well as Germany, but Germany is the greater loser and France will show the endurance necessary to outwit the German Government. ... French metallurgy is ready to suspend all operations, if necessary, to prove to the Germans that we are in earnest and intend to pursue our policy even if we suffer also.

According to historian Sally Marks, the real issue during the Ruhrkampf (Ruhr campaign), as the Germans labelled the resistance to the French occupation, was not the German defaults on coal and timber deliveries but the sanctity of the Versailles Treaty. Poincaré often argued to the British that letting the Germans defy Versailles in regards to reparations would create a precedent that would lead to the Germans dismantling the rest of the Versailles treaty. Finally, Poincaré argued that once the chains that had bound Germany in Versailles were destroyed, it was inevitable that Germany would plunge the world into another world war.

== Occupation ==
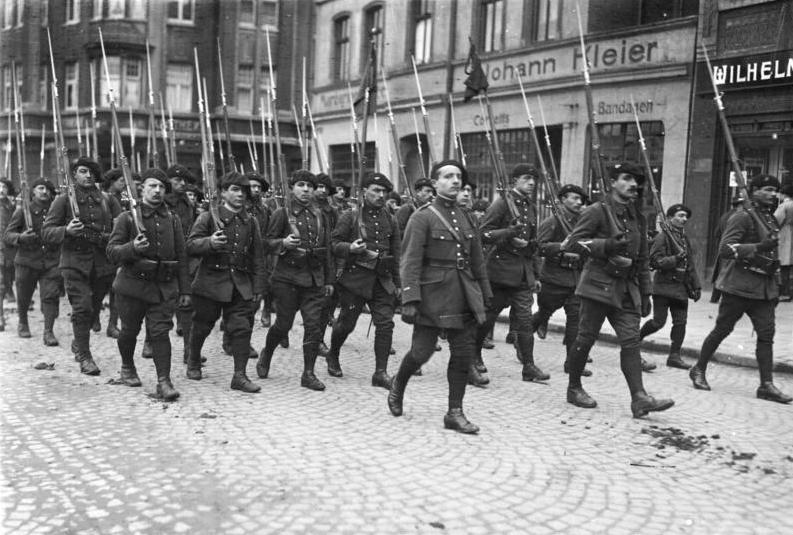
French Chasseurs Alpins in Buer (Gelsenkirchen)

Between 11 and 16 January 1923, French and Belgian troops under the command of French General Jean Degoutte, initially numbering 60,000 men and later climbing to 100,000, occupied the entire Ruhr area as far east as Dortmund.

The French immediately took over civil administration from the Germans. In order to determine the capacity of the smelters and mines to fulfil the reparations, the Inter-Allied Mission for Control of Factories and Mines (MICUM) also moved in with the French and Belgian expeditionary corps. MICUM consisted of 72 French, Belgian and Italian experts, most of whom were engineers.

It is not entirely clear whether Poincaré was concerned with more than just providing reparations. According to some historians, he sought a special status for the Rhineland and the Ruhr comparable to that of the Saar region, in which affiliation with Germany would have been purely formal and France would have assumed a dominant position.

The government of the United Kingdom categorised the occupation of the Ruhr as illegal. The United States government condemned the occupation as a reprehensible "policy of force".

== Resistance ==
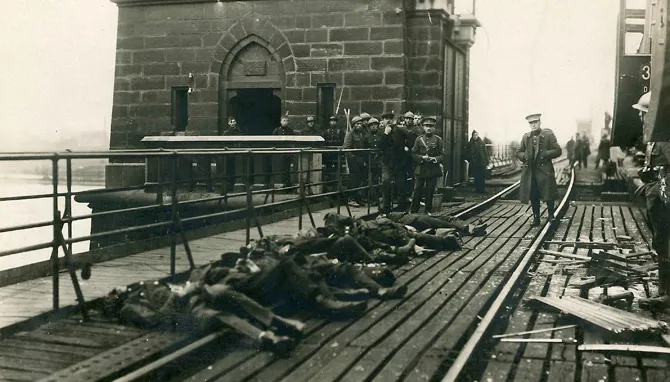
The bombing of a train carrying Belgian troops on leave while crossing the Rhine on the Duisburg-Hochfeld Railway Bridge, June 30, 1923. 10 Belgian soldiers died in this attack.

The occupation was met by a campaign of both passive resistance and civil disobedience from the German inhabitants of the Ruhr. Chancellor Cuno immediately encouraged the passive resistance, and on January 13, the Reichstag voted 283 to 12 to approve it as a formal policy. Officials were told not to cooperate with the occupying forces, and deliveries of reparation material were stopped. Protests against the occupation broke out across Germany. The Reichstag, recognizing that the extraordinary nature of the event could not be met using normal parliamentary measures, passed an enabling act on 24 February. It gave the Cuno government the power to use all necessary measures to resist the French, but Cuno made relatively little use of it.

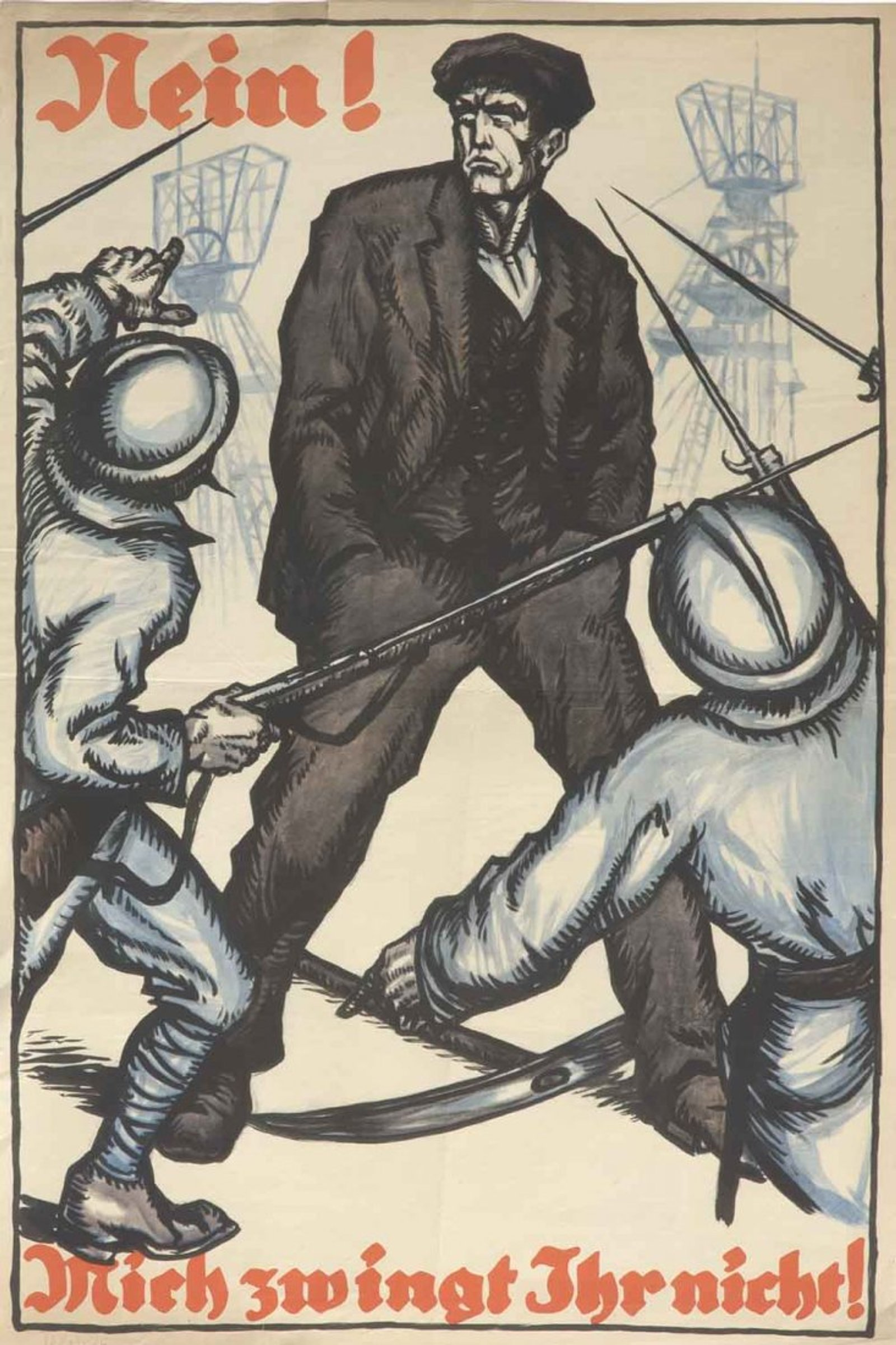
Protest poster from 1923 showing a worker refusing French orders: "No! You will not force me!"

The French initially planned to resume normal operation of German factories and mines using the workers already in place. Given the Germans' refusal to work under French oversight, that proved to be impossible. Instead, strike leaders were arrested and French strikebreakers were brought in. Attempts to ship out reserves of coal failed when German railroad officials and workers walked off the job and in some places removed signage from stations and signal boxes. The French once again brought in their own people to take control of the railways, although it took several months to get them running properly. The situation for the French was further complicated by the fact that the Rhenish-Westphalian Coal Syndicate moved its headquarters (including, crucially, its archives and operational plans) out of the occupied district and thus from control by MICUM. Coal taken out of the Ruhr dropped to less than the French had been receiving previous to the occupation. The Germans also stopped importing iron ore, which caused significant financial losses in the French iron mining region of Lorraine.

Even though relatively little violence accompanied the passive resistance, French authorities imposed between 120,000 and 150,000 sentences against resisting Germans. Some involved prison sentences, but the overwhelming majority were deportations from the Ruhr district and the Rhineland to the unoccupied part of Germany. Among those arrested were Fritz Thyssen of the Thyssen steel company for his refusal to deliver coal and Gustav Krupp, who held a large public funeral following an incident at the Krupp works in which thirteen striking workers were killed by French troops. Krupp was sentenced to fifteen years in prison and fined 100 million marks, but he served only seven months and was released when passive resistance was called off. The French also set up a blockade between the Ruhr and the rest of Germany. Deliveries of food, which were not included in the blockade, were nevertheless so badly disrupted that between 200,000 and 300,000 undernourished or starving children were evacuated from the Ruhr.

Acts of sabotage were carried out by both nationalists and communists. They blew up train tracks and canal bridges to stop the delivery of reparations material to France, attacked French and Belgian posts and killed at least eight collaborators. Some of the arms used by adherents of right-wing paramilitary groups were clandestinely supplied by the Reichswehr, the German armed forces of the Weimar Republic. In one incident of sabotage that gained wide public attention, the National Socialist Albert Schlageter was executed by the French for destroying a section of railroad track. He became a martyr figure in Germany, most notably to Adolf Hitler and the Nazis.

On the night of Sunday, 10 June 1923, two Frenchmen were shot dead in Dortmund by unknown persons. At midday the occupying forces imposed a curfew from 9 p.m. to 5 a.m. Dortmund residents who had gone on an excursion into the surrounding countryside were not informed of the measure. Six men from Dortmund and a Swiss citizen were shot without warning on their return. The burial of the Dortmunders on 15 June was attended by 50,000 people.

Acts of violence and accidents caused by the occupying forces had resulted in 137 deaths and 603 injuries by August 1924, shortly before the passive resistance was called off. Monetary damages to the economy of the Ruhr caused by the occupation were estimated at between 3.5 and 4 billion gold marks.

=== End of resistance ===
In addition to calling for passive resistance, Chancellor Cuno and his government undertook to support the workers idled by the shutdown of factories and mines. Ruhr industrial firms agreed not to lay off their employees and have them stay on to repair and maintain equipment. The government in return provided the firms with low interest loans and direct compensation. It also paid the salaries of civil service employees who were not working. From 60 to 100 percent of all wages in the Ruhr were in the end paid by the government. Since it lacked any other means to meet the enormous costs, it printed more and more paper money. The move helped spark the hyperinflation of 1923, during which Germany's currency, the Papiermark, fell from 17,000 to the US dollar at the beginning of the year to 4.2 trillion at the peak of the inflation. Germany's financial system broke down. There were food riots in the Ruhr and a nationwide wave of strikes against the Cuno government, which resigned on 12 August 1923.

Germany's new government, led by Gustav Stresemann of the German People's Party announced the end of passive resistance on 26 September. Two months later, the government replaced the Papiermark with the Rentenmark and restored the value of Germany's currency. In order to handle the economic fallout from the Ruhr occupation, Stresemann made extensive use of a second enabling act of 13 October.

== End of the occupation ==
=== Dawes Plan ===
Chancellor Stresemann returned to the policy of fulfilment introduced by Joseph Wirth. Stresemann's goal, however, was to improve international relations by making a good faith effort to comply with the terms of the Treaty of Versailles. He ordered striking workers (from the Cuno strikes) back to work and announced Germany's intention to once again make reparations payments. The moves restored enough international confidence in Germany so that when Stresemann sought discussions with the Allied Powers which would take into consideration what Germany was financially capable of paying, the Reparations Commission set up the Dawes committee, headed by the American economist Charles Dawes. It recommended that total reparations be reduced from 132 billion to 50 billion marks. Germany also received a loan of 800 million gold marks, financed primarily by American banks.

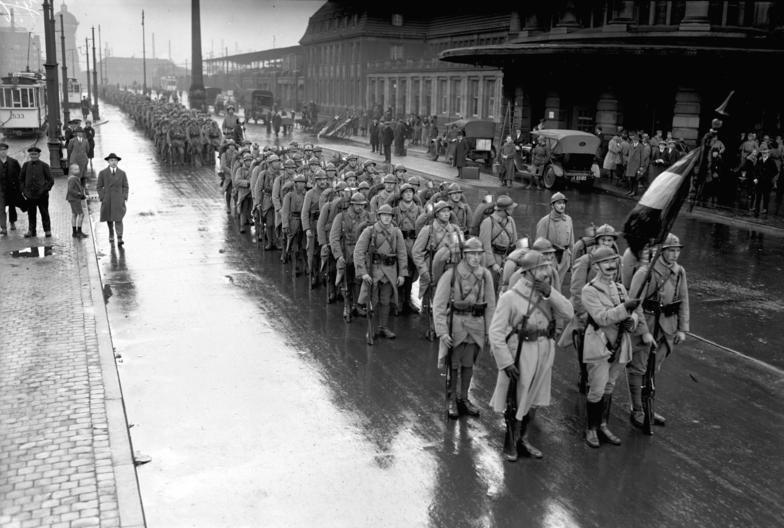
French troops leaving Dortmund

British Labour Prime Minister Ramsay MacDonald, who viewed the 132 billion figure as impossible for Germany to pay, successfully pressured French Premier Édouard Herriot into a series of concessions to Germany. The British diplomat Sir Eric Phipps commented that "The London Conference was for the French man in the street one long Calvary as he saw M. Herriot abandoning one by one the cherished possessions of French preponderance on the Reparation Commission, the right of sanctions in the event of German default, the economic occupation of the Ruhr, the French-Belgian railroad Régie, and finally, the military occupation of the Ruhr within a year". Under heavy Anglo-American financial pressure as well – the decline in the value of the franc made the French open to pressure from Wall Street and the City of London – the French agreed to the Dawes Plan. Following approval by the German Reichstag, the plan went into effect on 1 September 1924. The financial burden on Germany was eased, and its international relations improved.

=== French and Belgian withdrawal ===
On 3 September 1924, the Inter-Allied Rhineland High Commission returned control of local administration and the economy to the Germans. An amnesty was decreed, and most outward signs of the occupation largely disappeared from public view. The last French troops evacuated Düsseldorf and Duisburg along with the city's important harbour in Duisburg-Ruhrort on 25 August 1925.

== International reaction ==
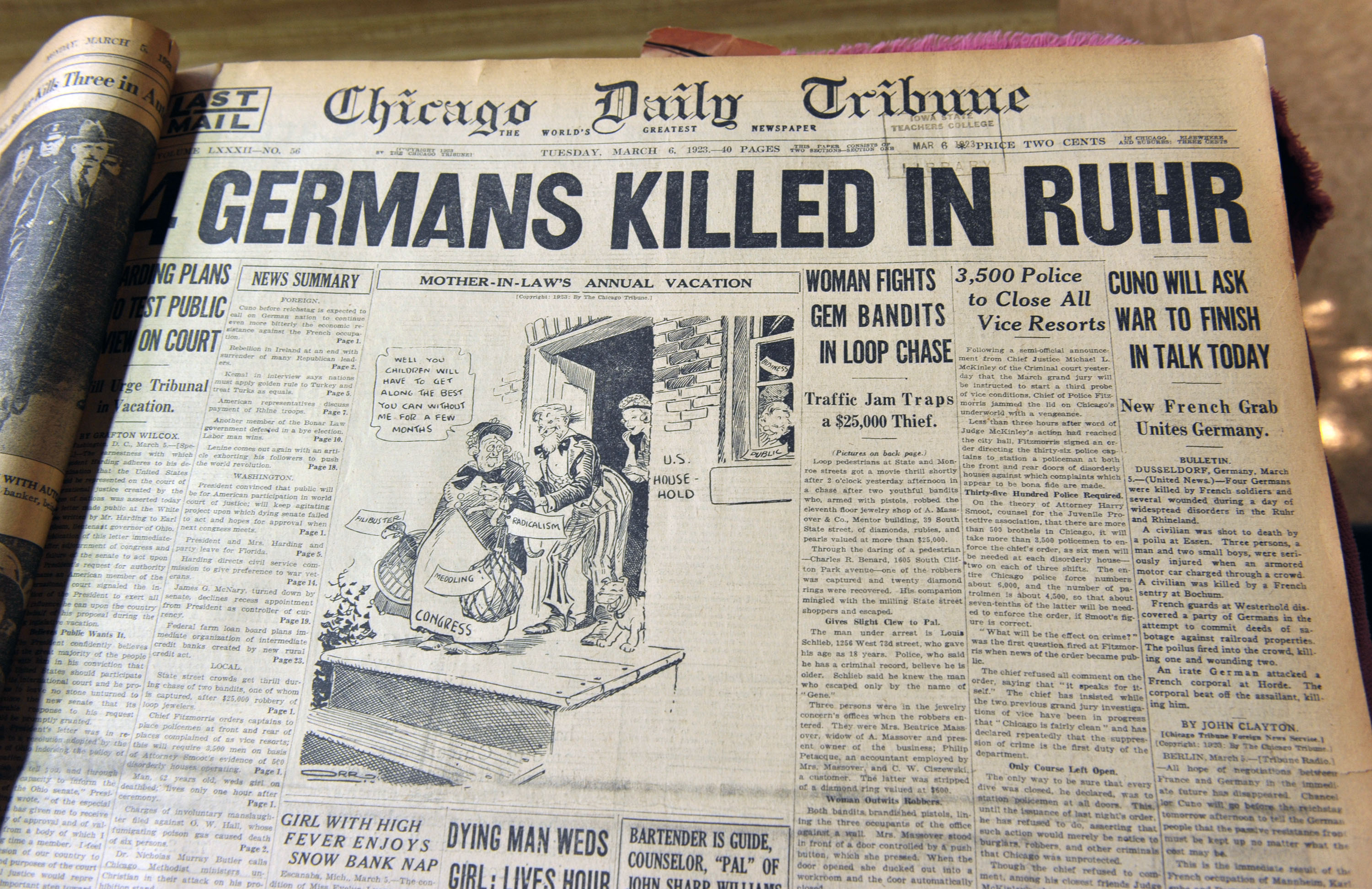
Front page of Chicago Daily Tribune, 6 March 1923, announcing that French troops had killed four resisting Germans

The French invasion of Germany did much to boost sympathy for the German republic internationally, although no action was taken at the League of Nations since the occupation was technically legal under the Treaty of Versailles. France's allies Poland and Czechoslovakia opposed the occupation because of their commercial links with Germany and their concern that the action would push Germany into a closer alliance with the Soviet Union.

Back on 12 July 1922 when Germany demanded a moratorium on reparation payments, tension developed between the French government of Poincaré and the coalition government of David Lloyd George. The British Labour Party demanded peace and denounced Lloyd George as a troublemaker. It saw Germany as the martyr of the postwar period and France as vengeful and the principal threat to peace in Europe. The tension between France and the United Kingdom peaked during a conference in Paris in early 1923, by which time the coalition led by Lloyd George had been replaced by the Conservatives. The Labour Party opposed the occupation of the Ruhr throughout 1923, which it rejected as French imperialism. The British Labour Party believed it had won when Poincaré accepted the Dawes Plan in 1924.

Despite his disagreements with the United Kingdom, Poincaré desired to preserve the Anglo-French entente and moderated his aims to a degree. His major goal was winning the extraction of reparation payments from Germany. His inflexible methods and authoritarian personality led to the failure of his diplomacy. After Poincaré's coalition lost the 1924 French legislative election to Édouard Herriot's Radical-led coalition, France began making concessions to Germany.

According to historian Sally Marks, the occupation of the Ruhr "was profitable and caused neither the German hyperinflation, which began in 1922 and ballooned because of German responses to the Ruhr occupation, nor the franc's 1924 collapse, which arose from French financial practices and the evaporation of reparations". Marks suggests that the profits, after Ruhr-Rhineland occupation costs, were nearly 900 million gold marks.

== German politics ==
After the government in Berlin called an end to passive resistance to the Ruhr occupation, the government of Bavaria declared a state of emergency and named its minister president, Gustav Ritter von Kahr, state commissioner general with dictatorial powers. In response, German President Friedrich Ebert instituted a state of emergency throughout the country and transferred executive power to Minister of Defence Otto Gessler. Kahr and two associates advocated a march on Berlin to overthrow the government, but on 8 November 1923 Adolf Hitler and members of the Nazi Party broke into their meeting and began the Beer Hall Putsch. They justified the attempt, which brought them wide public attention for the first time, in part by the "chaos" caused by the occupation of the Ruhr.

The French occupation of the Ruhr accelerated the formation of right-wing parties. The ruling centre-left coalition was discredited by its inability to address the crisis, while the far left Communist Party of Germany remained inactive for much of the period under the direction of the Soviet Politburo and the Comintern. Disoriented by the defeat in the war, conservatives in 1922 founded a consortium of nationalist associations, the Vereinigten Vaterländischen Verbände Deutschlands (VVVD, "United Patriotic Associations of Germany"). Their goal was to forge a united front of the right. In the climate of national resistance against the French Ruhr invasion, the VVVD reached its peak strength. It advocated policies of uncompromising monarchism, corporatism and opposition to the Treaty of Versailles. However, it lacked internal unity and money and so never managed to unite the right. It had faded away by the late 1920s, as the NSDAP (Nazi party) grew in strength.

== See also ==
- Media related to Occupation of the Ruhr (1923) at Wikimedia Commons
- History of the Ruhr
- Occupation of the Rhineland
- International Authority for the Ruhr

== Sources ==
- Fischer, Conan (2003). The Ruhr Crisis, 1923–1924. Oxford: Oxford University Press. ISBN 978-0-198-20800-6. online review
- Helmreich, Jonathan E. (1973). "Belgium and the Decision to Occupy the Ruhr : Diplomacy from a Middle Position". Revue belge de Philologie et d'Histoire. 51 (4): 822–839. doi:10.3406/rbph.1973.2989.
- Marks, Sally (September 1978). "The Myths of Reparations". Central European History. 11 (3): 231–255. doi:10.1017/S0008938900018707.
- O'Riordan, Elspeth Y. "British Policy and the Ruhr Crisis 1922–24," Diplomacy & Statecraft (2004) 15 No. 2 pp. 221–251.
- O'Riordan, Elspeth Y. Britain and the Ruhr Crisis (London, 2001).
- Walsh, Ben (2001). History in Focus: GCSE Modern World History;. London: John Murray. ISBN 978-0-719-57713-0.

=== French and German ===
- Stanislas Jeannesson, Poincaré, la France et la Ruhr 1922–1924. Histoire d'une occupation (Strasbourg, 1998)
- Michael Ruck, Die Freien Gewerkschaften im Ruhrkampf 1923 (Frankfurt am Main, 1986)
- Barbara Müller, Passiver Widerstand im Ruhrkampf. Eine Fallstudie zur gewaltlosen zwischenstaatlichen Konfliktaustragung und ihren Erfolgsbedingungen (Münster, 1995)
- Gerd Krüger, Das "Unternehmen Wesel" im Ruhrkampf von 1923. Rekonstruktion eines misslungenen Anschlags auf den Frieden, in Horst Schroeder, Gerd Krüger, Realschule und Ruhrkampf. Beiträge zur Stadtgeschichte des 19. und 20. Jahrhunderts (Wesel, 2002), pp. 90–150 (Studien und Quellen zur Geschichte von Wesel, 24) [esp. on the background of so-called 'active' resistance]
- Gerd Krumeich, Joachim Schröder (eds.), Der Schatten des Weltkriegs: Die Ruhrbesetzung 1923 (Essen, 2004) (Düsseldorfer Schriften zur Neueren Landesgeschichte und zur Geschichte Nordrhein-Westfalens, 69)
- Gerd Krüger, "Aktiver" und passiver Widerstand im Ruhrkampf 1923, in Günther Kronenbitter, Markus Pöhlmann, Dierk Walter (eds.), Besatzung. Funktion und Gestalt militärischer Fremdherrschaft von der Antike bis zum 20. Jahrhundert (Paderborn / Munich / Vienna / Zurich, 2006), pp. 119–30 (Krieg in der Geschichte, 28)
