= Vadim Rogovin =

Russian historian and sociologist (1937-1998)

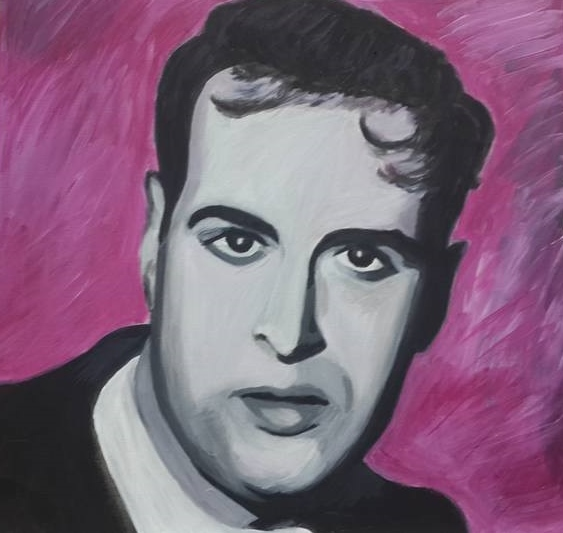
Vadim Rogovin painting

Vadim Zakharovich Rogovin (Russian: Вади́м Заха́рович Рого́вин; 10 May 1937 – 18 September 1998) was a Russian Marxist (Trotskyist) historian and sociologist, Ph.D. in philosophy, Leading Researcher at the Institute of Sociology of the Russian Academy of Sciences, and the author of Was There An Alternative?, the 7-volume study of the Stalin era between 1923 and 1940, with an emphasis on the Trotskyist opposition.

He was considered the leading Trotskyist Soviet historian to emerge after Perestroika. Rogovin was a supporter of the International Committee of the Fourth International.

In 1998, Rogovin died of cancer, survived by his wife, Galina Valiuzhenich.

== Was There An Alternative? ==
=== Introduction ===
In the introduction to the first volume of the Was There An Alternative? series, Rogovin explains his position and the purpose of this work as follows. In the history of the Soviet Union a crucial question was to find out the reason for the emergence of the phenomenon of Stalinism. Rogovin writes there are basically two diametrically opposed approaches. The first one is that Stalinism with its terror was a logical, unavoidable evolution of Marxism-Leninism within Bolshevism from the Socialist revolution. Another approach is to consider that Stalinism was a historically accidental development and that there was an alternative movement within Bolshevism (Trotskyism), and the major function of Stalinist terror was to suppress this movement.

Rogovin suggests that the first approach has become dominant in historical research for two major reasons. The first one is the coincidence of the goals in this respect of two major historical schools: of the official pro-Soviet school with the tradition of demonizing of Trotsky and Trotskyism and of the anti-Soviet, anti-Communist school, with its tradition of demonizing the whole Communist movement, for which purpose it was convenient to attribute the traits of Stalinism to Communism as a whole. The second reason is that with a few exceptions of émigrés, all Trotskyists were physically eliminated by Stalin so that there are virtually no memoirs, and nearly all documents of the Left Opposition were made inaccessible. Therefore, the historical picture has become distorted in this area for both subjective and objective reasons.

During Perestroika a large amount of memoirs of repressed people have become available. Unfortunately the memoirs of "true" Trotskyists (as opposed to the ones falsely accused of Trotskyism during Soviet repressions), are close to none, because all these real political opponents were physically eliminated. Fortunately the policy of glasnost had led to the opening of numerous archives, which make it possible to better trace the evolution towards Stalinism.

Rogovin writes that the treatise did not consider the debunking of various misconceptions, in order not to unnecessarily disrupt the harmony of the exposition of the second alternative mentioned above: to demonstrate that Stalinism was not the only logical possibility of the evolution of the principles of Bolshevism.

=== Reception ===
With the above purpose in mind, the major focus of the treatise was necessarily Trotskyism and the Left Opposition movement within Bolshevism. This focus gave rise to accusations of bias. For example, historian Yuri Felshtinsky recognized the value of his work, while expressing an opinion that ..Все эти книги, однако, проникнуты безудержной апологетикой Троцкого и проистекающим отсюда догматизмом ("All of these books, however, are imbued with rampant apologetics of Trotsky and with the dogmatism stemming from the former.").

In response to such criticism Mikhail Voeikov, Doctor of Economic Sciences and a professor of the Institute of Economics of the Russian Academy of Sciences, writes

Some opponents of Rogovin ascribe to him an apologetic attitude towards the person and the activity of Trotsky. Persons who are well acquainted with the whole world literature on this subject might agree with this impression. But for us, for the Russian readers who discovered the truth about Trotsky for the first time in the books of V.Z. Rogovin, no, we do not come away with an impression of apologetics. The very theme chosen by the author, "alternatives to Stalinism," by the nature of this genre presupposes the sort of tonality which is used by V.Z. Rogovin. However, even here one must bear in mind that in many cases Rogovin points out the miscalculations and errors of Trotsky. The book World Revolution and World War even contains a chapter entitled "In what and why did Trotsky err?" In general, however, Rogovin's books are not only about Trotsky. Behind some trees, even the very large ones, one must also see the forest.

== Bibliography ==
- Two Lectures: Stalin's Great Terror: Origins and Consequences: Leon Trotsky and the Fate of Marxism in the USSR (1996) Mehring Books ISBN 1-875639-13-6
- 1937: Stalin's Year of Terror (1998) Mehring Books ISBN 0-929087-77-1
- Was there an alternative to Stalinism in the USSR?: Two essays (1995) Labor Publications
- Stalin's Terror of 1937-1938: Political Genocide in the USSR (2009) Mehring Books ISBN 978-1-893638-04-4 (pbk.) ISBN 978-1-893638-08-2 (cloth)

=== Was There An Alternative? Series ===
1. Роговин В. З. «Троцкизм»: взгляд через годы. — М.: Терра, 1992. — Т. 1. — 399 с.
  - Was There An Alternative? / Byla li alternativa?: Trotskizm, vzgliad cherez gody (1992) ISBN 5-85255-128-7 (in Russian)
  - Was There an Alternative? - Trotskyism: A Look Through the Years (2003) Mehring Books ISBN 0-929087-71-2
2. Роговин В. З. Власть и оппозиции. — М.: Товарищество «Журнал „Театр“», 1993. — Т. 2. — 398 с.
  - Power and Oppositions / Vlast i oppozitsii (1993) ISBN 5-85272-012-7 (in Russian)
3. Роговин В. З. Сталинский неонэп. — М., 1994. — Т. 3. — 382 с.
  - Stalin's Neo-NEP / Stalinskii neonep (1994) ISBN 5-85272-016-X (in Russian)
4. Роговин В. З. 1937. — М., 1996. — Т. 4. — 479 с.
  - 1937(1996) ISBN 5-85272-022-4 (in Russian)
5. Роговин В. З. Партия расстрелянных. — М., 1997. — Т. 5. — 526 с.
  - The Party of the Executed / Partiia rasstreliannykh(1997) ISBN 5-85272-026-7 (in Russian)
6. Роговин В. З. Мировая революция и мировая война. — М., 1998. — Т. 6. — 415 с.
  - World War and World Revolution / Mirovaia revoliutsiia i mirovaia voina (1998) ISBN 5-85272-028-3 (in Russian)
7. Роговин В. З. Конец означает начало. / "The End Means the Beginning" — М.: Антидор, 2002. — Т. 7. — 480 с. (At the time of his death, Rogovin was only drafting chapters of Volume 7.)
