= Prince of Wales riots =

1921 riots in Bombay, British India

- Part of the Indian independence movement
- Edward, Prince of Wales, shortly after his arrival in Bombay, 17 November 1921
- Date: 17-20 November 1921
- Location: Bombay, British India
- Caused by: Minority support for the visit of Edward, Prince of Wales during a boycott called for by the non-cooperation movement

Parties
Mainly members of the Hindu and Muslim majority	European, Anglo-Indian and Parsi minorities

Casualties
- Deaths: 58
- Injuries: Several hundred
- Damage: 2.5 million rupees (equivalent to 526 million rupees in 2026)
- Charged: 400

The Prince of Wales riots occurred in Bombay (now also known as Mumbai), British India, between 17 and 20 November 1921 during the visit of Edward, Prince of Wales. The visit came during the non-cooperation movement protests for Indian self-rule, led by Mahatma Gandhi and the Indian National Congress. Gandhi had allied the mainly-Hindu Congress with the Muslim Khilafat Movement, who were concerned about the possibility that the British might depose the Ottoman Caliph. Gandhi called for his supporters to boycott the prince's visit and carry out a general strike (hartal).

The Prince was welcomed by members of the Parsi, Jewish and Anglo-Indian minorities. They were attacked by a Hindu and Muslim mob who also burnt shops, trams and cars. Parsi-owned liquor shops were a particular target. Anglo-Indian and Parsi mobs formed in response to the violence and attacked those they suspected of supporting the non-cooperation movement. Gandhi was shocked by the violence and declared he would undertake a hunger strike until peace was restored. The violence abated on 20 November, at least 58 lives having been lost. After the riots the British imprisoned thousands of non-cooperation movement supporters and Gandhi attempted to rebuild the movement with support from the minorities as well as the Hindu-Muslim majority.

== Background ==
In July 1918 George V, King of the United Kingdom and Emperor of India, announced that his son, Edward, Prince of Wales, would carry out a tour of the British Empire to thank its people for their contributions to the Allied effort in the First World War. The Prince began his tour in 1919 in Australia and Canada but the itinerary proved exhausting and his trip to British India was postponed to late 1921 to allow his health to recover. The four-month visit to India was to commence in Bombay and include stops in Calcutta, Madras, New Delhi, and Karachi, as well as a visit to British Burma.

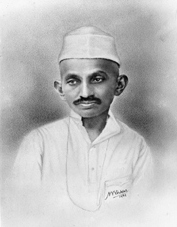
Gandhi pictured in the Bombay Chronicle on 1 July 1921

The visit came in the middle of the non-cooperation movement protests for self-governance by the Indian people. The non-cooperation movement had been started by pro-independence campaigner Mahatma Gandhi in September 1920. He had allied his mainly Hindu Indian National Congress with the Muslim Khilafat Movement to broaden the campaign. In the years following the First World War, the Khilafat supporters were concerned that the British would depose the Ottoman Caliph, the spiritual leader of Islam. Indian historian Dinyar Patel has described the Hindu-Muslim alliance as the greatest threat to British rule since the 1857 Indian Rebellion.

Hindus and Muslims together comprised a majority of the Indian population and minorities such as Christians, Sikhs, Parsis and Jews felt threatened by the alliance. Gandhi sought to assuage these worries, particularly within the Parsi community. In speeches he made in 1921 he said that "the Hindu-Muslim entente does not mean that big communities should dominate small communities" and that it was "impossible for the country to make a move forward without taking all the different communities with it and India could not afford to leave a single community behind".

The non-cooperation movement advocated that Indians should use only Indian-made goods and boycotted imported products, particularly cloth. The movement also supported the withholding of taxes and strikes by students. The Parsi minority in Bombay Province were particularly affected by the anti-import stance. The Parsis were heavily involved in the liquor trade; they accounted for 21% of alcohol dealers in the province, despite making up only 5% of the population. Gandhi was opposed to the liquor trade, particularly that involving the import of foreign liquor which was seen as a marker of wealth and colonial attitudes. In an open letter of March 1921 Gandhi advised the Parsis to leave it and support a prohibition on alcohol. Bombay had previously seen inter-religious violence including Hindu-Muslim violence in 1893 and Parsi-Muslim riots in 1851 and 1874.

A pamphlet calling for hartal and attendance at the bonfire

Gandhi called for a boycott of the Prince of Wales' visit and for a general strike (hartal) to be held. The Bombay Provincial Committee of the Indian National Congress agreed on 7 October to support the hartal and arranged bonfires of foreign-made cloth to be lit during the visit. Nationalist speakers, including Sarojini Naidu and Jamnadas M. Mehta, spoke to crowds in the city on 16 November to encourage Indians to stay away from the ceremonies planned to welcome the Prince to Bombay. Prince Edward hoped that his visit would raise Loyalist sentiment in India and counter the non-cooperation movement.

The British government of India had imposed repressive measures against public assembly earlier in 1921. The Viceroy, Lord Reading, was keen to negotiate with Gandhi over the prince's visit to Calcutta in December but was prevented by the India Office, which ordered that there would be no negotiations or concessions.

== Riots ==
The procession through Bombay

From the early hours of 17 November policemen and soldiers were assembled between the Apollo Bunder, where Prince Edward was due to arrive via the Royal Navy battlecruiser Renown, and the Cross Maidan, to which he was to travel in procession. From 8 am supporters of the hartal used force to prevent a number of trams, carrying Parsi, European and Anglo-Indian people from reaching the welcoming ceremony. The Prince landed at the Apollo Bunder at around 10.30 am. Congress and Khilafat supporters stayed at home and closed their businesses, while crowds of Parsis, Jews and Anglo-Indians turned out to support him. A journalist for the Bombay Chronicle considered the crowds assembled for the Prince to be less than 10% of that who had turned out to welcome his father, George V, for his 1911 visit ahead of the Delhi Durbar.

At around the same time as the Prince's arrival, Gandhi set light to the first bonfire of foreign-made cloth. Soon afterwards a crowd of striking millworkers from the Elphinstone Mills set fire to a number of trams and cars. As attendees of the procession left the protective ring of soldiers and police they were attacked by Hindu and Muslim supporters of the hartal. Some of the first victims were female European, Anglo-Indian and Parsi tram passengers. Pro-hartal rioters moved to the Parsi Grant Road district and the Anglo-Indian areas of Byculla, targeting those wearing Parsi and European clothing. By dusk, rioters had killed a European person and the British began to deploy soldiers into the troublespots.

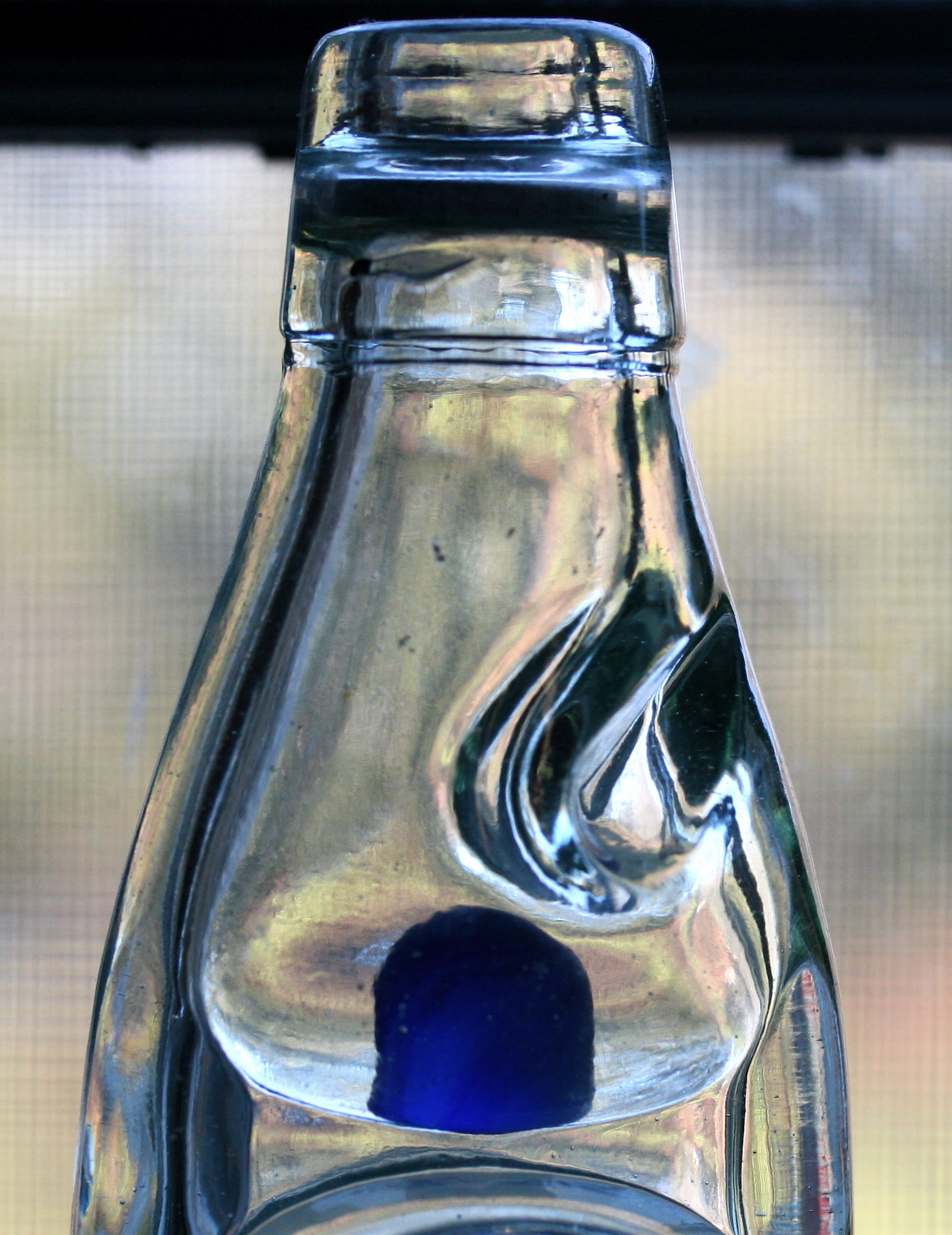
A glass bottle with marble stopper (blue)

While the violence of 17 November had largely been perpetrated by the pro-hartal faction, from the next day it became a more two-sided affair with Hindus and Muslims on one side and Parsis and Anglo-Indians on the other. Parsis and Anglo-Indians armed themselves with lathis and guns and sought to engage the Congress-Khilafat groups. Those wearing homespun khadi cloth, which had become a symbol of the anti-import campaign, were targeted. One of the Parsi and Anglo-Indian calls was "Down with the Gandhi caps", relating to the type of sidecap favoured by Gandhi and his supporters. Anglo-Indians and Parsis who supported the National Congress were at risk of attack from both sides of the riot. Seven-year-old Homai Vyarawalla witnessed the violence and recalled pitched battles in the streets with the marble stoppers of soda bottles and stones used as deadly projectiles against the minorities.

At mid-day on 18 November the Hindu-Muslim faction were joined by striking millworkers from Parel and rioters attacked three Parsi Zoroastrian temples, including the site of the most-holy Atash Behram. In addition to the violence, crowds set fire to shops, trams and cars. Parsi-owned liquor shops were particular targets; one store and the owner's attached home were only saved when he emptied his entire stock of alcohol into the gutter. On 20 November a mob of 500 Parsis, armed with lathis, harassed Hindus and Muslims on Princess Street. An American teacher at St Stanislaus College, Herbert J. Parker, noted that there was little effort exerted by the authorities to restore order outside of the European stronghold and central business district of the Fort. He recorded that here was no disorder in the Fort but the riots led to the cancellation of a gathering of schoolchildren at the Cross Maidan on 21 November and a delay in the Prince's review of the Bombay Boy Scouts.

As Gandhi drove around the city trying to halt the violence, he was aggrieved to hear the Congress mob shouting "Mahatma Gandhi ki jai" (Hindi for: "Glory to Mahatma Gandhi"). At one point he came across two policemen dying from stab wounds inflicted by the mob. Mehta and M. R. Jayakar were attacked by Parsis while trying to persuade a mob to disperse. In response to the violence Gandhi began the first hunger strike of his political career at 3:30 am on 19 November, vowing to neither eat nor drink until peace was restored.

Gandhi knew that there had been violence on both sides of the conflict but worried that assigning blame to the Parsis would drive them away from the nationalist cause. In a speech on 20 November, he said that "certainly the Parsi Mavalis [hooligans] are less to blame" and later said he could "excuse the aggrieved Parsis and Christians" for their "pardonable wrath". Order was restored in most parts of Bombay by 20 November, and Gandhi broke his fast on the following day after his representatives reported the city was peaceful. On 22 November he met with 150 civic and community leaders including both supporters and opponents of the non-cooperation movement, to try to broker peace. He also ordered an end to the picketing of liquor stores and made arrangements for the payment of compensation to Parsi victims of the riots.

During the riots at least 58 people were killed (including five police officers, three Europeans, an American and two Parsis) and hundreds were injured. Of the city's 600 licensed alcohol outlets, four were destroyed and 135 damaged. Some 2.5 million rupees (equivalent to 526 million rupees in 2026) of claims for property damage and personal injury were made, the majority by Parsis. The British press largely chose not to report on the riots or to minimise their impact, though Sir Percival Phillips of the Daily Express was an exception with his reports, made after a tour of the city by armoured car, noting "constant rioting and attacks on Europeans" in the "Bombay Battle Zone".

== Aftermath ==
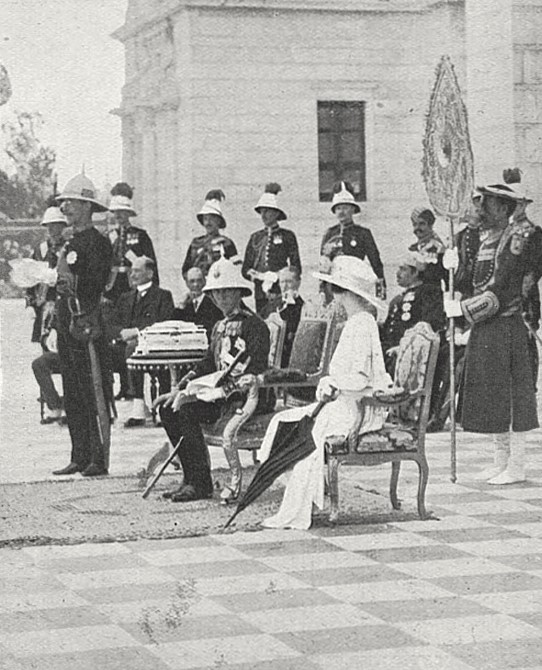
The Prince of Wales at the inauguration of the Victoria Memorial in Calcutta, January 1922

Gandhi was shocked that his hartal had led to riots. He was particularly disappointed that the Hindu-Muslim majorities had focused their violence upon Indian minorities, which served to confirm their fears that an independent India would be subject to a violent tyranny of the majority. To allay their fears Gandhi spoke about providing political spaces for minorities and introduced a new slogan "Hindu-Muslim-Sikh-Parsi-Christian-Jew unity", which he used often during the remainder of the non-cooperation movement campaign.

The riots marked the start of a shift in Gandhi's view for a post-independence India in which he saw that the Hindi and Muslim communities would have to play a role as guarantors of the rights of the minorities. The British Christian priest and friend of Gandhi, Charles Freer Andrews, wrote in 1930 that "probably no greater shock has ever come in recent years to any national leader, in the midst of an heroic struggle, than that from which Mahatma Gandhi suffered at Bombay in 1921". Gandhi himself considered it "possible to isolate Malabar [where a Khilafat-inspired movement had risen in rebellion against the British]. It was also possible to disregard Malegaon [where three police officers had been killed by nationalists in April 1921] but it is not possible to ignore Bombay". He considered, but decided against, ordering a pause in the activity of the non-cooperation movement because of the riots.

Some in the Parsi and Anglo-India communities in Bombay responded to the riots with calls for the establishment of self-defence organisations. However, the Parsis in particular appreciated Gandhi's comments expressing regret and there continued to be significant support for the nationalist cause in the community. The 1921 riots marked the last occasion of significant Parsi involvement in communal violence in India.

The Prince of Wales' opinion on the riots is not known; he spent much of the time at Government House, isolated from events. During the rest of his tour of India he visited Allahabad, Benares, Calcutta and Peshawar. At Allahabad the boycott was almost absolute, just 1,000 Indians attended the procession out of an expected 120,000. Similar scenes during a visit to the Banares Hindu University were covered up by filling seats left empty by Indian students with Europeans and children. Rumours of an assassination attempt in Peshawar led to the procession being redirected down back streets while order in Calcutta had been secured pre-emptive mass detention of thousands of nationalist supporters. The Prince considered the tour as a whole to be unsuccessful and a waste of money. Writing to his father he noted that "the crowds if there ever are any lining the routes through the European quarters are herded together into pens like sheep and guarded by constables". In correspondence with Lord Reading he said "the ostensible reason for my coming to India was to see as many of the natives as possible and to get as near to them as I could ... I am afraid that I have not had many opportunities of doing this" and expressed his concern that a failed tour would be worse for the Empire than if he had stayed away. The Prince blamed the unrest on the 1919 Montagu–Chelmsford Reforms that had introduced a measure of self-government in British India.

The British authorities prosecuted 400 people for involvement in the riots. More than 100 of those convicted were imprisoned, two were transported for life and two executed. By January 1922 thousands of Indians were imprisoned over the civil disobedience campaign, including hundreds of nationalist leaders. The campaign continued until the 4 February Chauri Chaura incident where nationalists killed 22 police officers who had attempted to intervene in a non-cooperation movement procession. When Gandhi received news of the attack on 8 February he called an end to the non-cooperation movement. The campaign was terminated despite opposition from fellow nationalist leaders Jawaharlal Nehru and Subhas Chandra Bose, with Gandhi citing the Prince of Wales riots and the Chauri Chaura incident as examples of how the movement had diverged from his creed of non-violence. Gandhi began a five-day fast in penance for the violence at Chauri Chaura on 12 February.

Lord Reading considered that the events had weakened Gandhi's political standing and the Governor of Bombay, George Lloyd, ordered the police Special Branch to compile evidence to allow for the arrest of Gandhi. His statements made in the aftermath of the riots, in which he accepted partial responsibility for the events, proved sufficient. Gandhi was arrested in March and, after pleading guilty at trial, was sentenced to six years' imprisonment for sedition, though he was released on health grounds in 1924.

== Bibliography ==
- Carter, April (1995). Mahatma Gandhi: A Selected Bibliography. Greenwood Publishing Group. p. 17. ISBN 978-0-313-28296-6.
- Chandavarkar, Rajnarayan (11 June 1998). Imperial Power and Popular Politics: Class, Resistance and the State in India, 1850-1950. Cambridge University Press. ISBN 978-0-521-59692-3.
- Dalton, Dennis (2012). Mahatma Gandhi: Nonviolent Power in Action. Columbia University Press. ISBN 978-0-231-15959-3.
- De, Rohit (4 August 2020). A People's Constitution: The Everyday Life of Law in the Indian Republic. Princeton University Press. ISBN 978-0-691-21038-4.
- Gifford, Jayne L. (2 January 2025). "The Politics of Pageantry: Royal Tours and Imperial Pomp on the Periphery of Empire". Diplomacy & Statecraft. 36 (1): 139–163. doi:10.1080/09592296.2024.2432102. ISSN 0959-2296.
- Kapoor, Pramod (8 February 2018). Gandhi: An Illustrated Biography. Roli Books Private Limited. ISBN 978-81-936009-1-7.
- Kaul, Chandrika (13 December 2006). "Monarchical Display and the Politics of Empire: Princes of Wales and India 1870-1920s". Twentieth Century British History. 17 (4): 464–488. doi:10.1093/tcbh/hwl025.
- Matthews, Roderick (1 July 2021). Peace, Poverty and Betrayal: A New History of British India. Hurst Publishers. p. 303. ISBN 978-1-78738-618-1.
- Patel, Dinyar (23 April 2018). "Beyond Hindu–Muslim unity: Gandhi, the Parsis and the Prince of Wales Riots of 1921". The Indian Economic & Social History Review. 55 (2): 221–247. doi:10.1177/0019464618760451. S2CID 150088024.
- Patel, Dinyar (19 November 2021). "Viewpoint: When Hindus and Muslims joined hands to riot". BBC News. Archived from the original on 17 January 2022.
- Parker, Herbert J. (22 April 1922). "Gandhi and the Bombay Riots". America. 27 (1): 5–7.
- Sapire, Hilary (1 April 2012). "Ambiguities of Loyalism: the Prince of Wales in India and Africa, 1921-2 and 25". History Workshop Journal. 73 (1): 37–65. doi:10.1093/hwj/dbr019.
- Wolpert, Stanley (2001). Gandhi's Passion: The Life and Legacy of Mahatma Gandhi. Oxford University Press, USA. ISBN 978-0-19-515634-8.
- Woods, Judith (1 December 2000). "Edward, Prince of Wales's Tour of India, October 1921-March 1922". The Court Historian. 5 (3): 217–221. doi:10.1179/cou.2000.5.3.002. ISSN 1462-9712.
