= Bade Miyan Chote Miyan =

Bade Miyan Chote Miyan (lit. 'Big Boss and Small Boss' in Hindi) may refer to these Indian films:

- Bade Miyan Chote Miyan (1998 film), action film by David Dhawan, starring Govinda and Amitabh Bachhan
- Bade Miyan Chote Miyan (2024 film), sci-fi action thriller film, starring Akshay Kumar and Tiger Shroff

== See also ==
- Bademiya, restaurant chain in Mumbai, India
