= Revolutions of 1917–1923 =

Revolutionary wave after World War I

- Part of opposition to and aftermath of World War I, and the interwar period
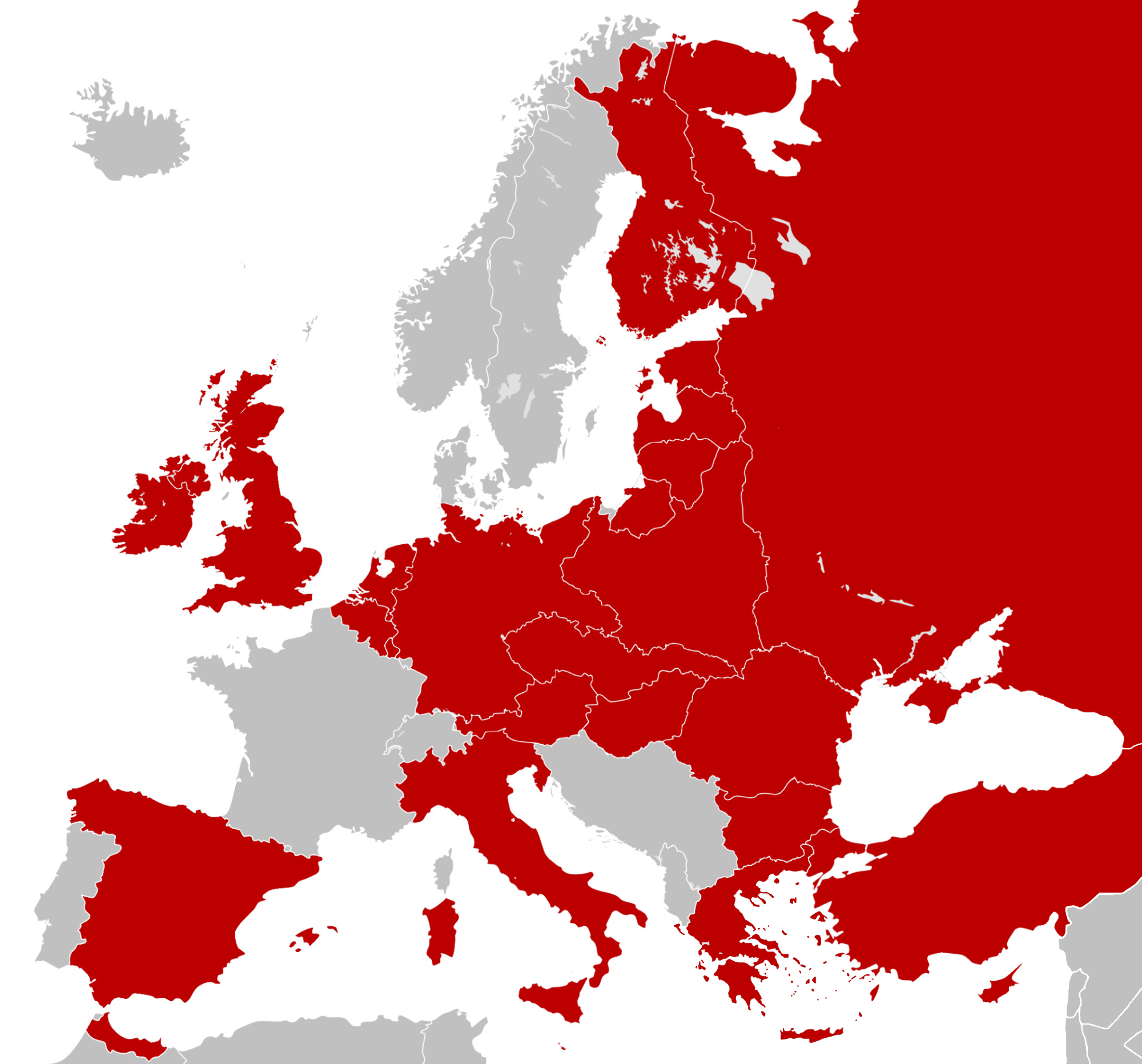
- European countries involved in revolutions of 1917–1923
- Date: 8 March 1917 – c. 24 July 1923
- Location: Worldwide (mainly in Europe and Asia)
- Caused by: World War I; Russian Revolution
- Goals: World communism; World revolution; Socialist patriotism; National liberation; Constitutionalism; Irredentism; Left nationalism
- Result: Political upheaval (Fascism in Europe): Collapse of the Russian Empire; Russian Revolution; February Revolution; October Revolution; Russian Civil War; Independence of Finland, Poland, Lithuania, Latvia, Estonia; Temporary establishment of Ukrainian People's Republic, Ukrainian State, Belarusian Democratic Republic, Democratic Republic of Georgia, Azerbaijan Democratic Republic, First Republic of Armenia, Mountainous Republic of the Northern Caucasus, Provisional National Government of the Southwestern Caucasus, Alash Autonomy; End of the German Empire; November Revolution; Creation of temporary Soviet Republics across Germany; Spartacist Uprising; Kapp Putsch; Ruhr Uprising; Collapse of Austria-Hungary; Aster Revolution; Revolution of 1919; Hungarian–Romanian War; Temporary establishment of Slovak Soviet Republic; Independence of Egypt; 1919 Egyptian revolution; Establishment of Kingdom of Egypt; Overthrow of the Bogd Khanate of Mongolia; Revolution of 1921; Partition of Ireland, and the creation of the Irish Free State; Irish War of Independence; Irish Civil War; End of the Ottoman Empire; Turkish War of Independence; Transformation of Turkish society via Atatürk's reforms; Rise of Fascism in Italy; Fiuman Revolution; Biennio Rosso; March on Rome

The revolutions of 1917–1923 were a revolutionary wave that included political unrest and armed revolts around the world inspired by the success of the Russian Revolution and disorder created by the aftermath of World War I. The uprisings were mainly socialist or anti-colonial in nature. Most socialist revolts failed to create lasting socialist states. The revolutions had lasting effects in shaping the future European political landscape, with, for example, the collapse of the German Empire and dissolution of Austria-Hungary.

World War I mobilized millions of troops, reshaped political powers and drove social turmoil. From the turmoil outright revolutions broke out, massive strikes occurred, and many soldiers mutinied. In Russia, Tsar Nicholas II abdicated during the February Revolution. The short-lived liberal Russian Provisional Government was formed, but it was overthrown by the Bolsheviks in the October Revolution, which triggered the bloody Russian Civil War. Many French soldiers mutinied in 1917 and refused to engage the enemy. In Bulgaria, many troops mutinied, and the Bulgarian Tsar stepped down. Mass strikes and mutinies occurred in Austria-Hungary, and the Habsburg monarchy collapsed. In Germany, the November Revolution led to the end of the German Empire. Italy faced various mass strikes. Turkey experienced a successful war of independence. Ireland was partitioned and the Irish Free State was created. Across the world, various other protests and revolts occurred.

== Communist revolutions in Europe ==
=== Russian Empire ===
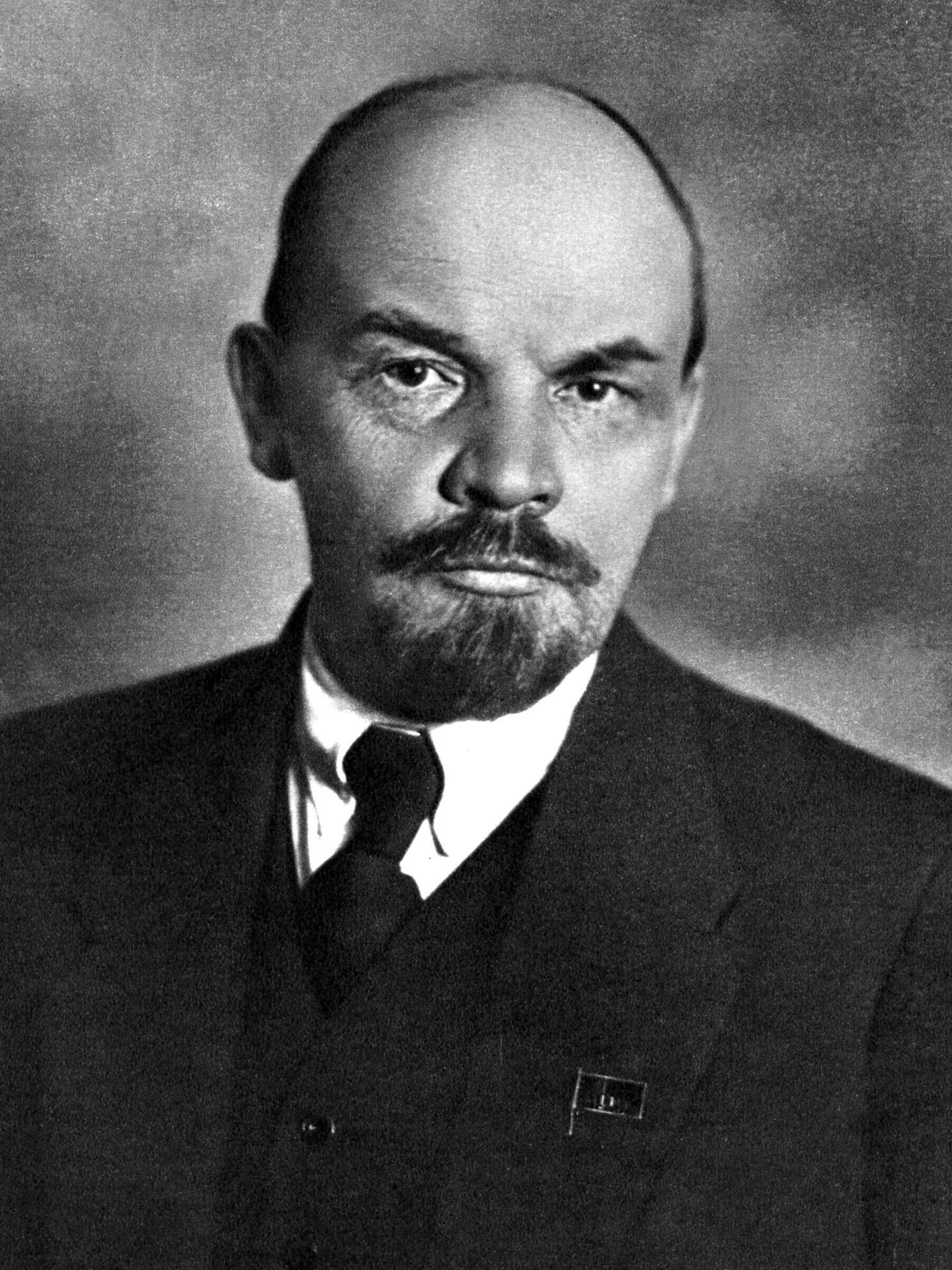
Vladimir Lenin, founder of the Soviet Union and the leader of the Bolshevik party.

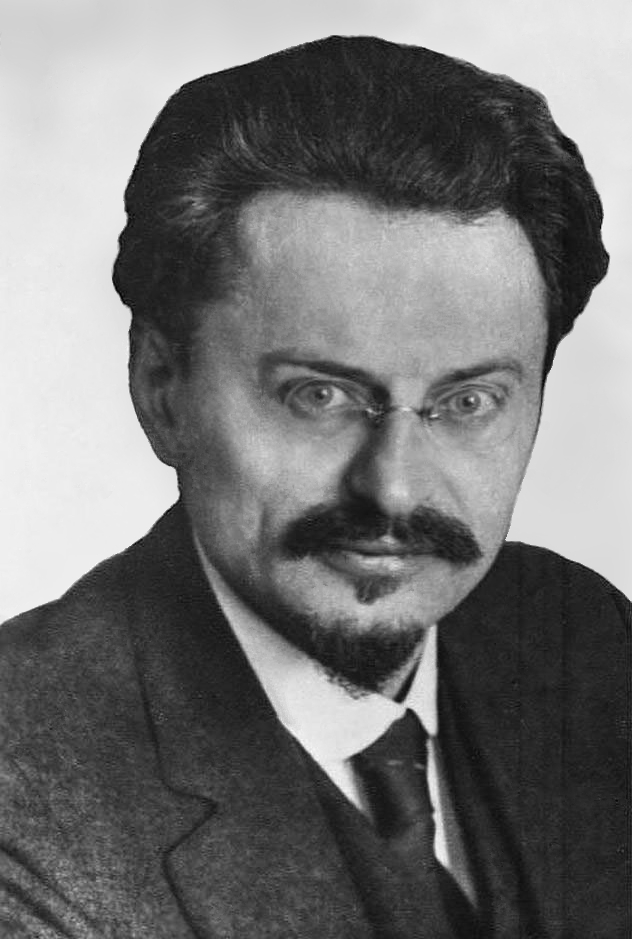
Leon Trotsky, founder of the Red Army and a key figure in the October Revolution.

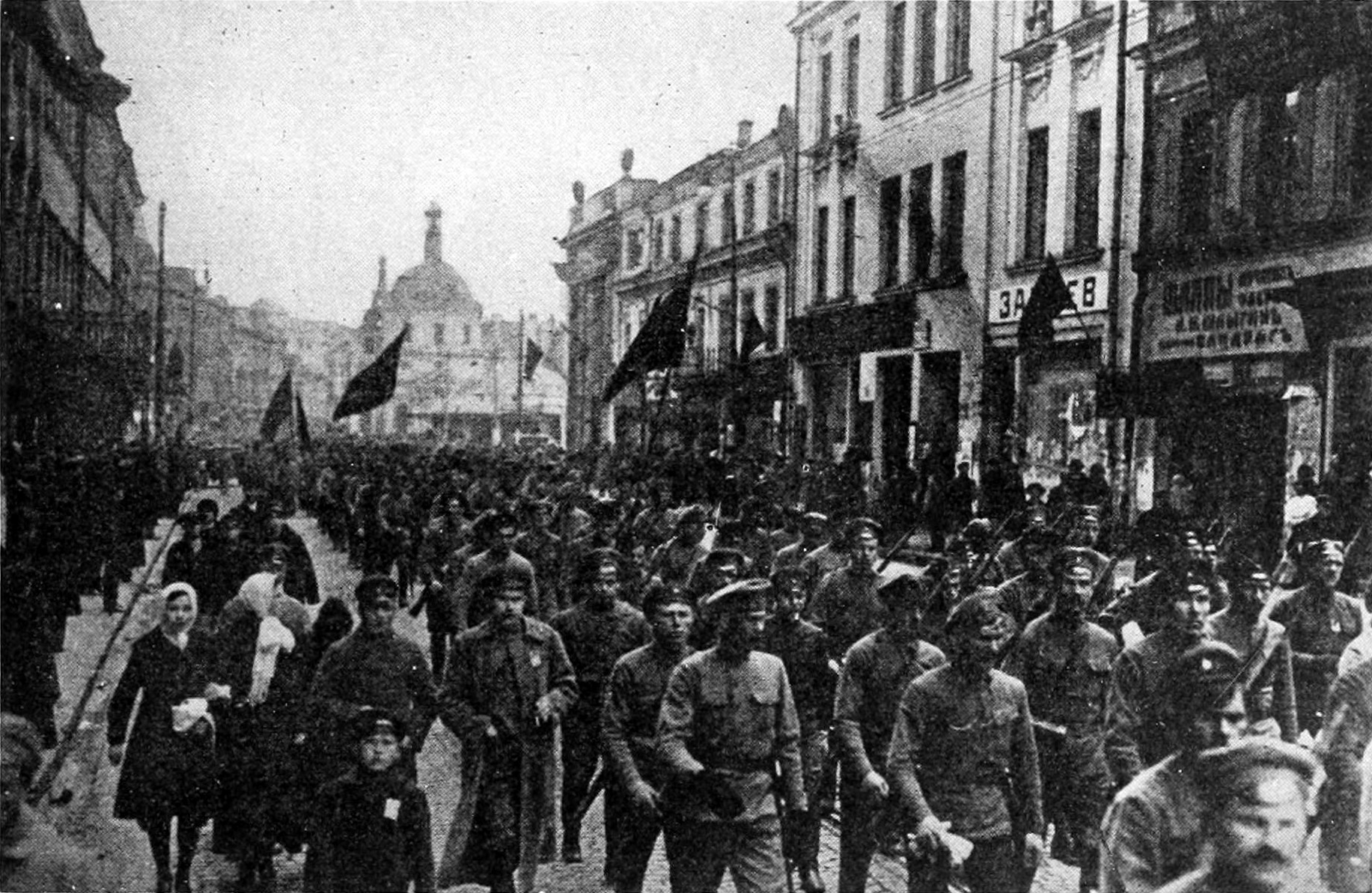
October Revolution in Moscow, Russia (1917).

In war-torn Imperial Russia, the liberal February Revolution toppled the monarchy. A period of instability followed, and the Bolsheviks, a radical faction of the Marxist Russian Social Democratic Labour Party (RSDLP) which split with the Mensheviks, seized power during the October Revolution (1917). The ascendant Bolsheviks soon withdrew from the war with large territorial concessions by the Treaty of Brest-Litovsk (1918) and fought their political rivals during the Russian Civil War, including the invading forces from the Allied Powers. In response to Vladimir Lenin, the Bolsheviks, and the emerging communist state of Soviet Russia, anti-communist forces from a broad assortment of ideological factions fought against the Bolsheviks, particularly by the counter-revolutionary White movement and the peasant Green armies, the various nationalist movements in Ukraine and other would-be new states like those in Soviet Transcaucasia and Soviet Central Asia, the anarchist-inspired Third Russian Revolution and the Tambov Rebellion.

By 1921, exhaustion, the collapse of transportation and markets and threats of starvation made even dissident elements of the Red Army revolt against the communist state, such as during the Kronstadt rebellion. However, the anti-Bolshevik forces were uncoordinated and disorganised, and all operated on the periphery. The Red Army, operating at the centre, defeated them one at a time and regained control. The Menshevik party was banned after the Kronstadt rebellion of the same year. The complete failure of Comintern-inspired revolutions was a sobering experience in Moscow, and the Bolsheviks moved from world revolution to socialism in one country: Soviet Russia. Lenin moved to open trade relations with the United Kingdom, Weimar Germany, and other major Western countries. Most dramatically, in 1921, Lenin introduced the New Economic Policy (NEP), which allowed private individuals to own small and medium-sized enterprises. In that process of revolution and counter-revolution, the Union of Soviet Socialist Republics (USSR) was officially created in 1922.

=== Grand Duchy of Finland and the Finnish Civil War ===
Following the February Revolution, the Social Democratic Party of Finland organized the Red Guards, made up of a motley crew of labor union activists, anarchists and left-wing activists. The Social Democrats had won an absolute majority in the Finnish parliament with 103 of 200 representatives in the parliamentary elections in July 1916. The spring of 1917 was relatively peaceful, although there was a serious food shortage and severe inflation, that angered both businesses and the working class. The anti-socialist political and social groups, especially the nationalists in the Young Finnish Party had funded and secretly supported the Finnish Jäger Movement, where hundreds of young Finnish students covertly enlisted in the German Army to fight the Russian Army on the Eastern Front. The July Days in Petrograd aggravated the situation in Finland, and there were tens of thousands of Russian troops in Finland as coastal defence forces, who had organized their own workers', sailors' and soldiers' councils across Finnish coastal cities like Helsinki, Turku and Viipuri.

Contrary to the Finnish left, the political Finnish right and anti-socialist politics were split into several factions, with tenant farmers, rural folk and the agrarian base supporting the Agrarian Union, teachers and the liberal city middle class supporting the Young Finnish Party, more conservative and appeasement-minded Finns (regarding the Russification policies), some with many financial ties to Petrograd and Russia supporting the Finnish Party and Finnish Swedes and some nobles supporting the Swedish Folks' Party.

Following Alexander Kerensky's rise to the premiership in the summer of 1917, the end of the Romanov monarchy and chaos in Petrograd, the Finnish parliament tried to establish a law known as "valtalaki", "powers act", which would formally move the role of the now abolished Russian monarch and the Governor General as the Supreme Executive of the Finnish State to either a three-man parliamentary executive council or the Finnish Senate (essentially the Cabinet of the Parliament). The law was debated intensely and no consensus could be established. The more pro-revolution Social Democrats were split before October 1917. Some wanted the law to pass so that the Social Democratic majority in the Finnish Parliament could establish Finland as an independent socialist state, but the problems persisted, such as the Russian military presence, of which thousands were pro-Bolshevik.

In August 1917, the Kornilov Coup severely shuffled the pack in terms of the Helsinki-Petrograd relations. A consensus between the social democrats and the bourgeoisie blocks was established, and they decided to hold new elections in October 1917 as a sort of "first elections" following the abolishment of the Romanov monarchy. In the October elections, the bourgeoisie coalition united and won the majority in parliament. This splintered the internal divide within the SDP even more, as the October revolutions was within weeks of happening and several pro-revolution Finnish Social Democrats were in active conversations with the Bolsheviks in Petrograd, such as Otto Wille Kuusinen, Kullervo Manner and Karl Wiik. The Parliament declared confidence for the bourgeoisie Svinhufvud Senate, which would later ratify Finland's declaration of independence on December 6, 1917. The speech for the declaration was already given by Svinhufvud to the parliament on December 4.

Partly following anger and rising tensions after the October elections, the Social Democrats called a general strike; one of Finland's only three in history. Otto Ville Kuusinen and Kullervo Manner, as members of the SDP's internal executive council favored revolution now and the SDP's council voted against the decision for revolution in November by only one vote – later Kuusinen regretted this, as he had already named several pro-revolution figures to the council and had support for more. Additionally, tensions were increased when a massacre occurred in Mommila, in which an independent Bolshevik detachment of Russian soldiers stormed a Finnish mansion murdering Finnish businessman Alfred Kordelin. Future president Risto Ryti and his wife Gerda escaped the events at Mommila by mere minutes, fleeing to a nearby forest.

The White Guards started mobilizing following the attack and declared their support for Svinhufvud's Senate.

By mid-January, the country had plunged to chaos. General-Lieutenant Gustaf Mannerheim had arrived from discharge from Odessa to Petrograd to Vaasa to organize a Finnish army. In mid-January the Svinhufvud Senate declared the White guard to be the legal and official army of the Finnish state. Several members of parliament loyal to the republic and Svinhufvud senate departed to Vaasa, where the White Army's headquarters were to be located. Additionally, the money printing machines of the Bank of Finland were evacuated to Vaasa to continue the production of currency for the Finnish state.

By January 27, 1918, the Red Guards lit the flames atop the Helsinki Workers' House signifying the revolution had begun. The White Army organized in Vaasa managed to disarm thousands of Russian soldiers (with Bolshevik sympathies) in Seinäjoki and Vaasa on January 26 and 27. By February, the Finnish Jägers from Germany had returned to Finland and arrived in Vaasa. By February–March 1918, Reds were in a tough state, as German negotiators (with active contacts by the White Finnish government) during the Brest-Litovsk peace treaty negotiations essentially forced the Bolsheviks to give up rights to Finland, stop supporting the Reds and completely disarm the rest of the Russian soldiers stationed in Finnish land still controlled by the Reds.

In March–April, German forces landed in Hanko, Åland and East Uusimaa region and with a three-pronged attack from the West, North and East, captured Helsinki with Finnish troops. The war essentially ended by May 15, 1918, and the Whites held a victory parade in Helsinki on May 16.

=== Western Europe ===
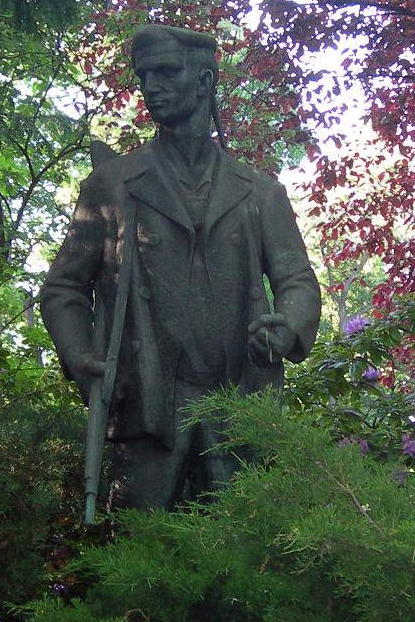
Statue of a revolutionary soldier; memorial to the German Revolution in Berlin

The Leninist victories also inspired a surge in revolutionary action to achieve world communism: the larger German Revolution and its offspring, like the Bavarian Soviet Republic, the neighbouring Hungarian Revolution and the Biennio Rosso in Italy in addition to various smaller uprisings, protests and strikes, all of which proved abortive.

The German Revolution however proved decisive in abdication of the German Kaiser, as well the end of the German Empire and as such came to shape the political future of Europe. It also helped convince lawmakers in the U.K. to start lifting the crippling embargo on the country.

The Bolsheviks sought to coordinate this new wave of revolution in the Soviet-led Comintern, and new communist parties separated from their former socialist organisations and the older moderate Second International. Lenin saw the success of the potential German revolution as being able to end the economic isolation of the newly formed Soviet Russia. Despite ambitions for world revolution, supporters of Socialism in one country led by Joseph Stalin came to power in the soviet state, instituted bolshevization of the Comintern, and abolished it in 1943.

After the Second World War, the Red Army occupied most of Eastern Europe, and communists came to power in the Baltic states, Poland, Hungary, Czechoslovakia, Romania, Bulgaria and East Germany.

=== Italy ===
The aftermath of the First World War in Italy resulted in great levels of unemployment and an economic crisis. For example, by the end of 1920, the Italian lira was worth only one-quarter of its 1914 value and in the first half of 1921, the cost of living for an average working-class family was 560% higher than it had been in 1914. These factors helped cause the Biennio Rosso (or the Two Red Years) which was a period of intense social conflict between Communist revolutionaries and the Italian Kingdom. The rise in working class support for Socialism in this period was rapid and very significant as the Italian Socialist Party increased its membership to 250,000, the major Socialist trade union "The General Confederation of Labour", reached two million members, while the anarchist Italian Syndicalist Union saw up to 500,000 affiliates join.

This period of revolutionary activity was characterised by the creation of factory councils under the control of Communist revolutionaries and Anarcho-Syndicalists. Class conflict also emerged in the countryside, with strikes and clashes across the Northern Po Valley.

Despite the rising support for revolution in Italy, the revolutionaries were not able to capitalise on the growth of their movement, which resulted in a desire for social change slowly waning and paved the way for March on Rome.

=== Hungary ===
After the First World War, Austria-Hungary was dissolved. Its replacement in Hungary was the Hungarian Soviet Republic, a socialist state established in March 1919. It was dissolved in early August following defeat in the Hungarian–Romanian War.

== Non-communist revolutions ==
=== China ===
In China, the May Fourth Movement emerged in response to the Paris Peace Conference decision to transfer the German Empire's Kiautschou Bay Leased Territory to the Empire of Japan. Li Dazhao and other radicals, inspired by Russia's October Revolution, redirected segments of the movement toward Marxist organization. In Guangzhou, Chen Gongbo and Tan Pingshan drew on Karl Kautsky and German social democracy and supported elections, popular enlightenment, and Chen Jiongming’s federalist self-government against more centralized revolutionary strategies. These debates overlapped with the Guangzhou base of the Constitutional Protection Movement (1917 to 1922) to resist the Beiyang government. Sun Yat-sen’s relations with Soviet Russia remained cautious, until Chen Jiongming expelled him from Guangzhou in 1922. Sun then regarded Comintern support and a disciplined party-army inspired by democratic centralism, as a solution to his military and constitutional failures. This was formalized in the Sun–Joffe Manifesto of January 1923 and subsequent reorganization of the Kuomintang.

=== Ireland ===
In Ireland, then part of the United Kingdom, the nationalist Easter Rising of 1916 anticipated the Irish War of Independence (1919–1921) within the same historical period as this first wave of communist revolution. The Irish republican movement of the time was predominantly a nationalist and populist form of radical-republicanism, and although it had left-wing positions and included socialists and communists, it was not communist. The Irish and Soviet Russian Republics, nevertheless, found common ground in their opposition to the British Empire and established a trading relationship. However, the British historian E. H. Carr later commented that "the negotiations were not taken very seriously on either side". Both the Irish Republic and the Russian Soviet Federative Socialist Republic were pariah states that were excluded from the Paris Peace Conference. The resulting Irish Free State was founded in 1922.

=== Greece ===
The clash between radical republicanism and conservative monarchism was also at the heart of political conflict in Greece. In the years leading up to the war, Greece had participated in Balkan Wars against neighbouring states on nationalist and irredentist grounds. The Great War, by bringing Greece into the victorious side against its old rival, Ottoman Empire, had brought to a head existing tensions between two loose camps of Greek political elites that is known as the National Schism. On the left, the Venizelists, led by Eleftherios Venizelos, was liberal, republican, progressive and nationalist; favoured France and Britain in foreign policy and sought profound democratising reforms influenced by the Radicals of the Third French Republic and by British Prime Minister David Lloyd George. On the right, the monarchists were conservative, clerical and traditionalist; favoured Germany in foreign policy, and supported a powerful political role for the king. Between 1919 and 1922, Greece pursued war with Turkey to take advantage of the dissolution of the Ottoman Empire and acquire territory inhabited by ethnic Greeks. Greece's disaster at the Battle of Dumlupınar prompted the discrediting of its conservative and monarchist establishment: the army mutinies and popular uprisings in 1922 led to initially a military coup by republican army officers, followed by the forced abdication of King Constantine I in 1923 and the abolition of the monarchy and the establishment of the Second Hellenic Republic in 1924. That period of instability carried on for the rest of the interwar period, with General Pangalos installed as dictator in the military coup of 1925, a return to democracy under Venizelos in 1928 and the restoration of the monarchy by a military coup in 1935.

=== Spain ===
Spain, despite its neutrality during the war, was also affected by turmoil between radical republicanism and traditionalist monarchism. The Restoration Monarchy of 1874 was a parliamentary regime but a conservative one that underrepresented popular classes and gave the monarch a major political role. A democratising revolution was attempted in 1917 by an alliance of radical republicans, socialists and disaffected Spanish Armed Forces officers, but it soon failed. After the war, however, critics of the constitutional monarchy grew as the international climate proved favourable to republican or democratising institutional change, and the Restoration state proved unable to resolve a series of challenges brought on by the war, notably a postwar economic slump and renewed anti-imperial action in the colonies. Strike movements proliferated between 1919 and 1923, leading notably to an escalating paramilitary conflict between worker and employer movements in cities such as Barcelona. Meanwhile, Spain went to war in 1920 to maintain control over the last remnants of its colonial empire, which culminated in a disastrous defeat at Annual in 1921, which discredited the constitutional monarchy. Repeated elections failed to produce working majorities in parliament for either establishment party, the Fused Liberal Party or the Liberal-Conservative Party, to address the crises. In the face of widespread social unrest and institutional paralysis, General Miguel Primo de Rivera demanded power, and was appointed head of government with dictatorial powers by King Alfonso XIII. The revolutionary and democratising movements of 1916–22 were forestalled by the installation of a military dictatorship that would last until the Second Republic of 1931.

=== Mexico ===
The Mexican Revolution (1910–1920) degenerated into factional fighting among the rebels by 1915, as the more radical forces of Emiliano Zapata and Pancho Villa lost ground to the more conservative "Sonoran oligarchy" and its Constitutional Army. The Felicistas, the last major group of counterrevolutionaries, abandoned their armed campaign in 1920, and the internecine power struggles abated for a time after revolutionary General Álvaro Obregón had bribed or slain his former allies and rivals alike, but the following decade witnessed the assassination of Obregon and several others, abortive military coup attempts and a massive traditionalist uprising, the Cristero War, against the government's persecution of Roman Catholics.

=== Malta ===
The revolts of the Sette Giugno of 1919 (In English: Seven of June) was a revolt characterised by a series of riots and protests by the Maltese population, initially as a reaction to the rise in the cost of living in the aftermath of World War I and the sacking of hundreds of workers from the dockyard. That coincided with popular demands for self-government that resulted in a National Assembly being formed in Valletta at the same time of the riots. That dramatically boosted the uprising, as many people headed to Valletta to show their support for the Assembly. The British forces fired into the crowd, killing four local men. The cost of living increased dramatically after the war. Imports were limited, and as food became scarce prices rose, which made the fortune of farmers and merchants with surpluses to trade.

=== Egypt ===
A countrywide revolution against the British occupation of Egypt and Sudan was carried out by Egyptians and Sudanese from different walks of life in the wake of the British-ordered exile of the revolutionary leader Saad Zaghloul and other members of the Wafd Party in 1919. The revolution was countered, but nevertheless led to Britain initiating the Milner Mission. This in turn led to Britain's recognition of Egyptian independence in 1922 and the implementation of a new constitution in 1923. Britain, however, maintained great influence over the newly created Kingdom of Egypt. Britain retained control of the Canal Zone and Sudan. King Fuad died in 1936, and Farouk inherited the throne at only 16. Alarmed by the Second Italo-Ethiopian War during which Fascist Italy invaded Ethiopia, he signed the Anglo-Egyptian Treaty, which required Britain to withdraw all troops from Egypt by 1949 except at the Suez Canal. During World War II, Allied troops used Egypt as a major base for its operations throughout the region. The British Armed Forces were withdrawn to the Suez Canal area in 1947, but nationalist anti-British sentiment continued to grow after the war.

=== Iraq ===
The Iraqi Revolt began in Baghdad in the summer of 1920 with mass demonstrations by Iraqis, including protests by embittered officers from the old Ottoman Army, against the British who published the new land ownership and the burial taxes at Najaf. The revolt gained momentum when it spread to the largely tribal Shia regions of the middle and lower Euphrates. Sheikh Mehdi Al-Khalissi was a prominent Shia leader of the revolt. Using heavy artillery and aerial bombardment, the uprising was suppressed by the British.

Sunni and Shia religious communities cooperated during the revolution as well as tribal communities, the urban masses, and many Iraqi officers in Syria. The objectives of the revolution were independence from British rule and the creation of an Arab government. The revolt achieved some initial success, but by the end of October 1920, the British had suppressed the revolt, although elements of it dragged on until 1922. Although the British won militarily, the Iraqis achieved a political victory. Greater autonomy was given to Iraq, with Faisal I of Iraq installed as King of Iraq. Also, the British Mandate for Mesopotamia was cancelled.

=== Turkey ===
Following the surrender of the Ottoman Empire in the Armistice of Mudros and the subsequent Treaty of Sèvres, resistance to both the Ottoman Sultanate and foreign occupying forces ramped up through the formation of the Kuva-yi Milliye, irregular militias that fought against the French in what became the Southern Front of the war. Following the occupation of Izmir by Greek forces, the Grand National Assembly (GNA) was formed as a counter-government led by Mustafa Kemal Atatürk. The GNA continued to fight against occupying forces, especially the Greeks who marched further into Anatolia, but halted their advance at the Battle of the Sakarya. This was followed by the start of the Great Offensive which pushed the invading Greek forces out of Anatolia.

The aftermath of the war of independence saw the abolition of the Ottoman sultanate, ending 623 years of Ottoman rule and the sovereignty of the Grand National Assembly over Turkey. On October 29, 1923, a Republic was declared in Turkey with Atatürk as its president, who introduced Atatürk's reforms. These were a series of reforms and policies that completely overhauled Turkish society, economy, and government.

== List of conflicts ==
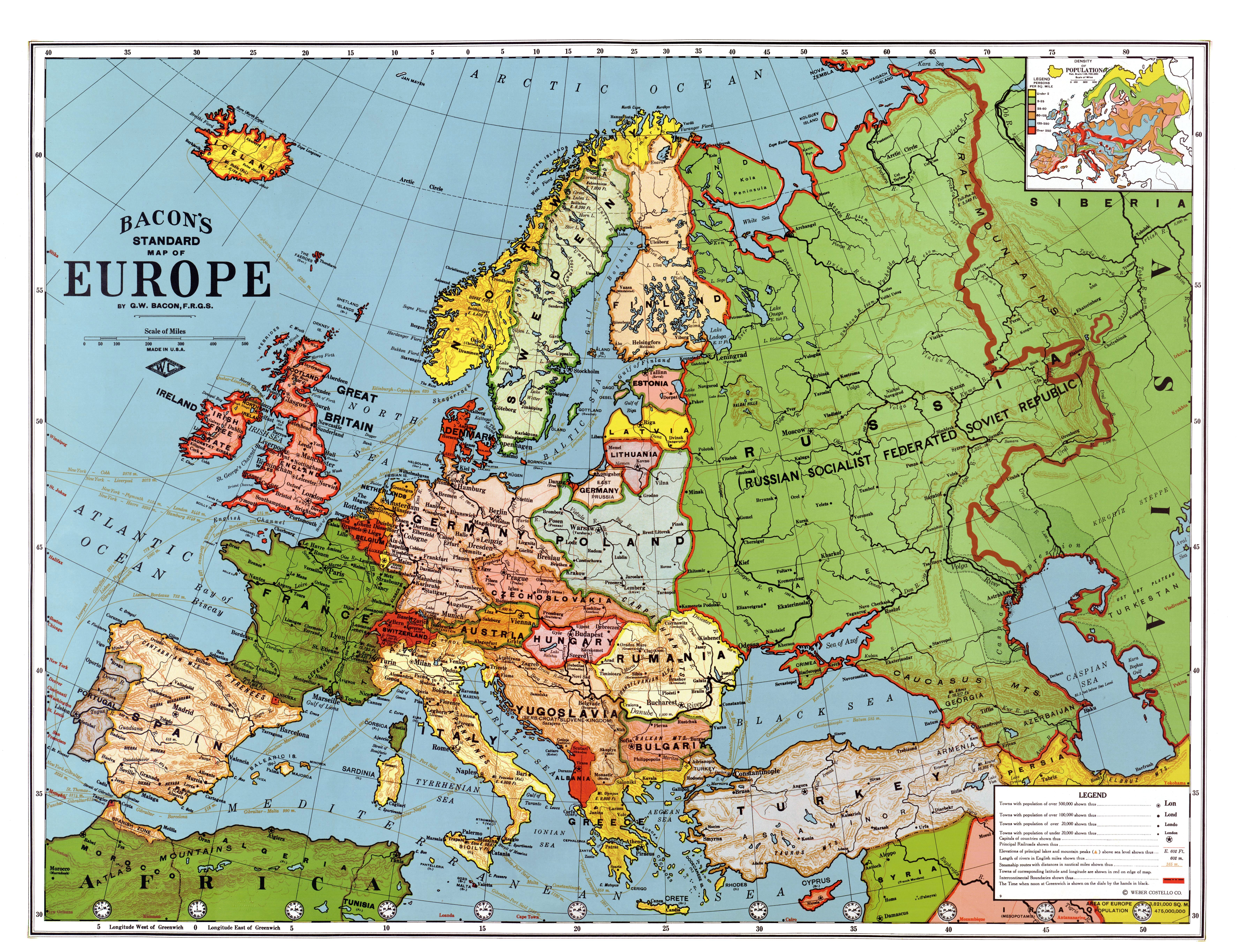
Map of Europe in 1923, after the revolutions.

=== Communist revolutions that started 1917–1924 ===
- Russian Revolution (1917)
  - Russian Soviet Federative Socialist Republic
  - Ukrainian Soviet Republic (1918)
  - Ukrainian Soviet Socialist Republic (1919)
  - Socialist Soviet Republic of Lithuania and Belorussia
  - Lithuanian Soviet Socialist Republic (1918–1919)
  - Latvian Socialist Soviet Republic (1918–1920)
  - Commune of the Working People of Estonia (1918–1918)
  - Finnish Socialist Workers' Republic
- In Spain:
  - Revolution of 1917
  - 'Red Triennium' of 1918–1921
- Jungle Movement of Gilan (1915/17–1920)
  - Persian Socialist Soviet Republic (1920–1921)
- Austro-Hungarian strike of January 1918 (1918)
- Makhnovshchina (1918)
- Aster Revolution (1918)
- Red Week (Netherlands) (1918)
- Finnish Civil War (1918)
- Darwin rebellion (1918)
- Political violence in Germany (1918–1933)
  - German strike of January 1918 (1918)
  - German Revolution (1918–1919)
    - People's State of Bavaria (1918–1919)
    - Bremen Soviet Republic (1919)
    - Bavarian Soviet Republic (1919)
    - Würzburg Soviet Republic (1919)
  - Ruhr uprising (1920)
  - March Action (1921)
  - Hamburg Uprising (1923)
  - German October (1923)
- Brussels Soldiers' Council (1918)
- Revolutions and interventions in Hungary (1918–1920)
  - Hungarian Soviet Republic
  - Slovak Soviet Republic (1919)
- Fascist and anti-Fascist violence in Italy (1919–1926)
  - Biennio Rosso (1919–20)
  - Labin Republic (1921)
  - Proština rebellion (1921)
- Tragic Week (1919)
- Limerick Soviet (1919)
- Canadian Labour Revolt (1919)
- Georgian coup attempt (1920)
- Provisional Polish Revolutionary Committee (1920)
- Patagonia Rebelde (1920–1922)
- May Uprising (1920)
- Mongolian Revolution of 1921
- Black Friday (1921)
- Rand Rebellion (1921–22)
- Prince of Wales riots (1921)
- 1922 Italian general strike (1922)
- Great Railroad Strike of 1922 (1922)
- September Uprising (Bulgaria) (1923)
- 1923 Kraków riot (1923)
- Tatarbunary Uprising (1924)
- Estonian coup d'état attempt ("Tallinn Uprising") (1924)
- Luxembourg rebellions (1918–1919)

=== Left-wing uprisings against the Bolsheviks ===
- Left SR uprising (1918)
- Left-wing uprisings against the Bolsheviks (1918–1922)
- Bolshevik–Makhnovist conflict (1920–1921)
- Tambov Rebellion (1920–1921)
- Kronstadt Rebellion (1921)
- August Uprising (Georgia) (1924)

=== Counter-revolutions against USSR that started 1917–1921 ===
- White movement (1917–1923)
- Ukrainian People's Republic (1917–1921)
- Ukrainian State (1918)
- Belarusian Democratic Republic (1918–1919)
  - Slutsk uprising (1920)
- Estonian War of Independence (1918–1920)
- Latvian War of Independence (1918–1920)
- Lithuanian Wars of Independence (1918–1920)
- Kuban People's Republic (1918–1920)
- Almighty Don Host (1918–1920)
- Mountainous Republic of the Northern Caucasus (1917–1920)
- Christmas Uprising (1919)
- North Caucasian Emirate (1919–1920)
- 1918–1920 unrest in Split (1918–20)
- Democratic Republic of Georgia (1918–1921)
  - August Uprising (1921)
- First Republic of Armenia (1918–1920)
- Mountain Republic of Armenia (1921)
  - February Uprising (1921)
- Azerbaijan Democratic Republic (1918–1920)
  - Ganja rebellion (1920)
- Kars Republic (1918–1919)
- Republic of Prekmurje (1919)
- Bulgarian coup d'état (1923)
- Military Coup of 1923 (Spain)

=== Soviet counter-counter-revolutions that started 1918–1919 ===
- Russian Civil War (1917–1923)
- Red Terror (1918)
- Polish–Soviet War (1919–1921)

=== Other ===
- Champaran Satyagraha (1917)
- Brazilian strike movement (1917–1919)
  - Rio de Janeiro anarchist insurrection (1918)
- Rice riots of 1918 (1918)
- Vue Pa Chay's revolt (1918)
- In Poland:
  - Greater Poland uprising (1918–1919)
  - Komańcza Republic (1918–1919)
  - Lemko Republic (1918–1920)
  - Republic of Gniew (1919–1920)
  - Republic of Ostrów (1918)
  - Republic of Tarnobrzeg (1918–1919)
  - Republic of Zakopane (1918)
  - Sejny Uprising (1919)
  - Silesian Uprisings (1919–1921)
- United States strike wave of 1919 (1919)
- Turkish War of Independence (1919–1923)
  - Revolts during the Turkish War of Independence (1919–1923)
- Third Anglo-Afghan War (1919)
- March First Movement (1919)
- Mahmud Barzanji revolts (1919)
- 1919 Polish coup attempt (1919)
- 1919 Polish coup attempt in Lithuania (1919)
- Irish War of Independence (1919–1921)
- The Troubles in Ulster (1920–1922)
- Iraqi Revolt (1920)
- Husino rebellion (1920)
- Vlora War (1920)
- Kapp Putsch (1920)
- Uprising in West Hungary (1921)
- Albanian–Yugoslav border war (1921)
- Charles IV of Hungary's attempts to retake the throne (1921)
- 1921 Persian coup d'état (1921)
- Bloody Night (Lisbon, 1921)
- Malabar rebellion (1921)
- Rif War (1921–26)
- Bondelswarts Rebellion (1922)
- 1922 Burao tax revolt (1922)
- Irish Civil War (1922–1923)
- Klaipėda Revolt (1923)
- Beer Hall Putsch (1923)
- Leonardopoulos–Gargalidis coup attempt (1923)

== See also ==
- Aftermath of World War I
  - Timeline of World War I (1917–1918)
- Diplomatic history of World War I
  - Corfu Declaration (1917)
  - Treaty of Berlin (1918)
  - Treaty of Rapallo (1920)
  - Treaty of Lausanne (1923)
  - Treaty of Versailles (1919)
- Economic history of World War I
  - 1918 Swiss general strike
  - Austro-Hungarian strike of January 1918
  - Blockade of the German Empire (1914–1919)
  - Blockade of the Eastern Mediterranean (1915–1918)
  - German strike of January 1918
  - Police strikes in the United Kingdom (1918–1919)
- International relations (1814–1919)
- International relations (1919–1939)
- Political history of the world
  - Dissolution of Austria-Hungary (1919–1920)
  - Dissolution of the Ottoman Empire (1908–1922)
  - November Revolution and rise of the German Republic (1918–1919)
- Roaring Twenties
  - Années folles in post-war France
  - Goldene Zwanziger in post-war Germany
