= 1918 Rio de Janeiro anarchist insurrection =

Brazilian uprising

- Part of the 1917–1919 Brazil strike movement and the Revolutions of 1917–1923
- Date: November 18, 1918
- Location: Rio de Janeiro
- Caused by: High cost of living; Poor working conditions; Police repression of strike actions
- Goals: The overthrow of the state and its replacement with workers' councils
- Methods: General strike; Insurrection
- Result: Government victory: Insurrection suppressed; Anarchist movement repressed; Workers' organizations dissolved

Parties
Anarchists: Anarchist Alliance; General Workers' Union	Brazil: Rio de Janeiro; Police

Lead figures
José Oiticica; Astrojildo Pereira; José Elias da Silva; Manuel Campos	Delfim Moreira; Alberto Cardoso de Aguiar; Agnelo Collet; Peregrino da Silva; Olympio Agobar de Oliveira

Casualties
- Deaths: 2 workers
- Arrested: 14 strike leaders 200 workers

The 1918 Rio de Janeiro anarchist insurrection was an unsuccessful attempt at overthrowing the federal government and the establishment of a self-managed society, based on the anarcho-syndicalist models of decentralized organizations and trade unions. It was inspired by the events of the Russian Revolution.

== Background ==
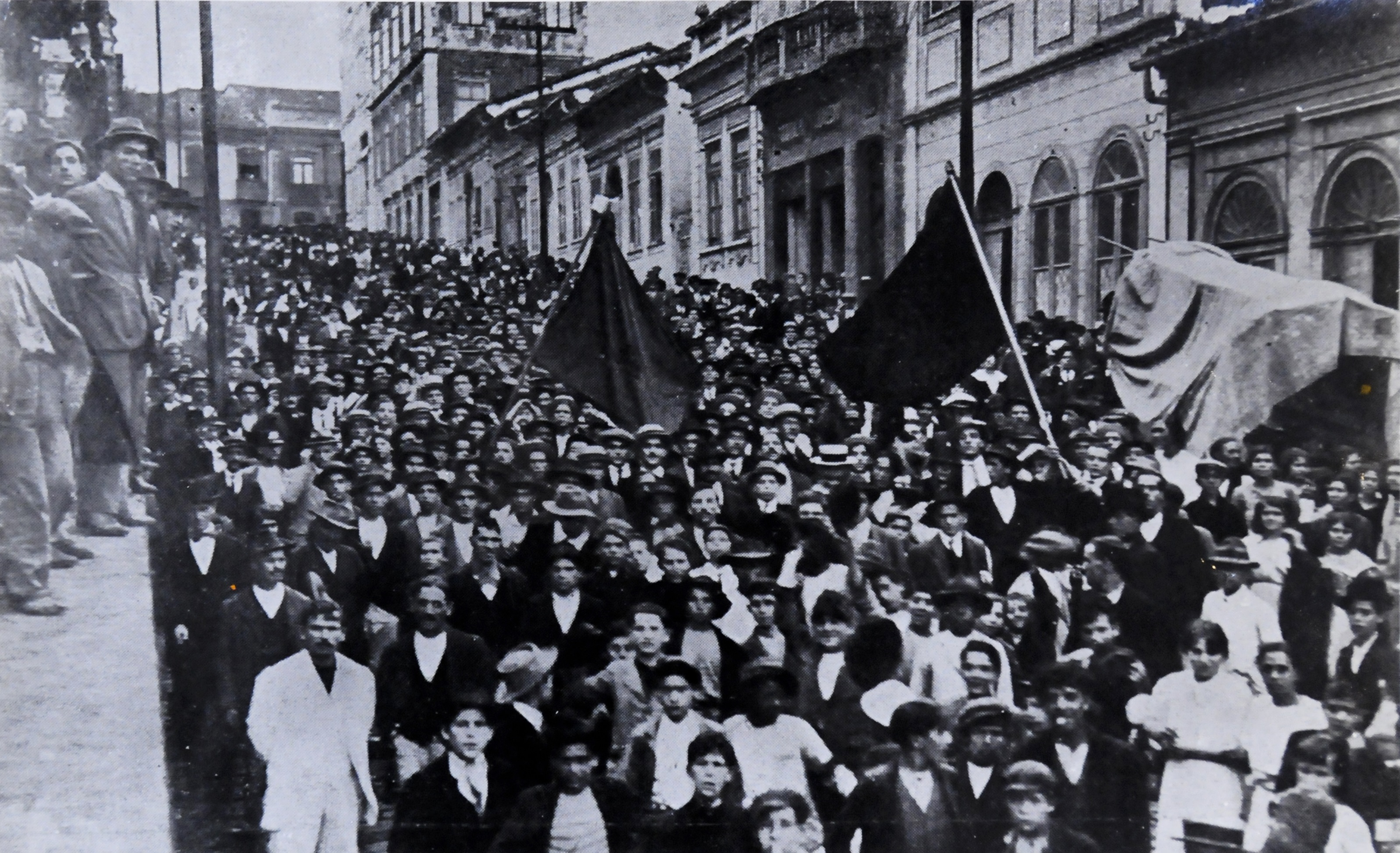
Workers and anarchists march holding flags through the city of São Paulo in the 1917 general strike.

Indirect precedents of 1918 insurrection were the arrival of works by Bakunin, Kropotkin and other European libertarian writers to Brazil by the end of the 19th century together with Italian and Spanish immigrants from Europe, to serve as cheap labor force in factories and farms of wealthy Brazilian entrepreneurs.

But directly, the insurrection is the consequence of the high level of organization among the Brazilian proletariat in the first decades of the 20th century, especially in Rio de Janeiro, at the time the capital, and in São Paulo. In 1917, resulting from the articulation of various unions and anarchist organizations, the São Paulo industry was put at a halt, with mass participation of workers in the 1917 general strike.

In parallel, the Spanish flu outbreak had spread around in many Brazilian cities, taking thousands of lives. As a consequence of the First World War, the high cost of living had hit mostly the poorer strata of the population, and the hunger of thousands resulted in the looting of warehouses and commerce.

In Rio de Janeiro, FORJ (Portuguese: Federação Operária do Rio de Janeiro; Worker Federation of Rio de Janeiro) begun a great campaign against this expensive cost of living and worked towards the restructuring of several trade unions. At the same time, despite not being allowed by the police, many large worker meetings popped up, in which speakers and thinkers made speeches to hundreds or thousands of people.

The strike in the Corcovado textile factory was heavily repressed by the police in May, and the collapse of the Hotel New York in July, with the death of tens of workers, rose the hostility of workers and anarchists towards government officials and business owners. Work conditions in factories, as in neighborhoods such as Barreto, Santo Aleixo and the city of Rio de Janeiro, were terrible, in badly-lit workplaces, full of smoke, where there were no proper bathrooms for the employees but holes on the ground. Many times, child workers received negative paychecks because of production mistakes, and physical punishment was constant. The factories were overseen by foremen and thugs, who suppressed any protest, rather effectively, since they lived nearby the worker settlements. Even pregnant women worked tirelessly in these poor work conditions.

At the beginning of 1918, news about the success of the Russian Revolution spread throughout Brazilian capitals. Not knowing about the character of the Bolshevik Revolution, anarchist groups came to organize themselves with the intention of overthrow the Brazilian central government.

In January 1918, the Anarchist Alliance of Rio de Janeiro was created, whose main objective is to spread libertarian thinking among workers from different sectors. On March 1, the General Workers' Union (UGT) was founded, replacing the FORJ which in August 1917 had been closed by the state repressive apparatus. Since its inception, the UGT was also the target of police repression, which reacted to rumours of an alleged general strike. Nevertheless, strikes continued through 1918.

On May 1, 1918, a state of siege was declared in the city of Rio de Janeiro, workers and anarchists organized to commemorate International Workers' Day in union offices, in halls and even in a theatre. In June, the Germinal Anarchist Group staged a festival with plays.

In August, workers from Companhia Cantareira and Viação Fluminense went on strike for better wages and an eight-hour working day, paralyzing both the Rio – Niterói ferryboats and the tramways. Faced with the strike, the businessmen activate the state repressive apparatus that try to end the strike by force. In the face of repression, the workers reacted by making the strike take on the character of an insurrection. In the face of police violence, a considerable number of soldiers from the 58th Hunters' Battalion entered the conflict, taking up arms alongside the workers.

== Planning ==
In September and October, the conflict between workers and cops in the capital's streets continued. In this climate, revolutionaries met up to develop the anarchist insurrection, to be realized on November 18. Its objective was to overthrow the State and substitute it with a worker council network.

In secret meetings, determined intellectuals met up, as the professor José Oiticica and syndicalists such as Manuel Campos, Astrogildo Pereira, Carlos Dias, Álvaro Palmeira, José Elias da Silva, João da Costa Pimenta e Agripino Nazaré. They counted on sectors of low ranking army officials to join, led by the lieutenant Jorge Elias Ajuz, who was responsible for the uprising's military strategy.

These plans involved directly above 400 workers, and indirectly thousands of others, to the takeover and encirclement of the Government Palace, the establishment of a lightning general strike of many sectors of the proletariat, the planting of 1600 bombs to sabotage energy lines and transport, and the occupation of police stations and military bases to maintain focal points of resistance.

== November 18 ==
In the morning of November 18, textile industry workers declared synchronous strikes in factories in Niterói, the Barreto neighborhood, Petrópolis, Magé and the Santo Aleixo neighborhood, and Rio de Janeiro. Quickly, metallurgy and civil construction industry workers joined the strikes. By the afternoon, around 400 workers met up in São Cristóvão Palace, to which police was mobilized in order to disperse the revolt. A battle began as the workers reacted. Two bombs exploded in a nearby police station and the mob advanced. Next, army soldiers encircle the location, taking back the station and dispersing the workers there. The conflict expands to the nearby streets with the Army coming to stop the protesters, trying to occupy the Army command building.

When set in motion, the attempt to overthrow power was frustrated by the authorities who were aware of all the plans, since Lieutenant Jorge Elias Ajuz, who had attended all the meetings and knew all the plans, actually acted as a spy and agent provocateur. Upon learning that the uprising had been betrayed, the workers began to avoid extreme attitudes, abandoning previously defined plans. After the Intendência was taken, workers and rebel soldiers were supposed to head to the center and attack the City Hall, the Police Palace and the barracks of the police brigade. In the south zone, another group of workers was supposed to occupy the Palácio do Catete and the Chamber of Deputies, removing the president and other politicians. But none of that happened.

With the assistance of the police informant who had infiltrated the anarchist group, the men who plotted the insurrection were arrested: ten Brazilians, three Portuguese immigrants, and one Spanish immigrant, who in the following days were deported or expelled to other states in the country. The police also arrested about 200 workers, among them 78 directly linked to anarchist unions. The battle at the Confiança factory between the police and the insurgents resulted in the death of the textile industry trade unionist Manuel Martins and the injury of another worker who died days later. The funeral processions of both were banned by the police, but still took place accompanied by hundreds of workers.

Over 200 workers were detained, among which 78 of them were directly linked to anarchist unions. Conflicts between the police and protesters in front of the Confiança factory resulted in the death of textile industry syndicalist Manuel Martins and of another wounded worker the next few days. Funeral celebrations were prohibited for both by the police, despite still being attended by hundreds of workers.

== Aftermath ==
The insurrection was widely used as a reason for Delfim Moreira, acting president, to persecute and put an end to countless anarchist organizations, many of them without any involvement in the events. On November 20, the federal government decreed the dissolution of the UGT, along with the closure of the metal workers, civil builders and textile industry unions that were still on strike – which lasted another two weeks. By the end of the decade, numerous repression operations were carried out and not even the modern schools in several Brazilian cities were spared. On the other hand, thanks to popular pressure resulting from the strikes and the insurrection on November 20, 1918, a law was passed in the Federal Senate that defined that "work is regulated by laws that give them necessary guarantees: guarantees to society, guarantees to employers, guarantees to the workers".

98 years after this event, anarchist collectives performed an act in memory of this event with the painting of a mural on the factory wall in front of the Henrique Lage Technical School.

== Participants ==
- Agripino Nazaré
- Álvaro Palmeira
- Astrojildo Pereira
- Carlos Dias
- João da Costa Pimenta
- José Elias da Silva
- José Oiticica
- Manuel Campos
- Manuel Martins
- Rodolfo Pereira Leal

== See also ==
- Brazil during World War I
- Prague Spring
- May 68
- Spanish Civil War
- Carnation Revolution

== Bibliography ==
- de Góes, Plínio Jr., ed. (2017). The LusoAnarchist Reader: The Origins of Anarchism in Portugal and Brazil. IAP. ISBN 978-1-68123-720-6.
- Nébias, Wellington Barbosa (2009). A greve geral e a insurreição anarquista de 1918 no Rio de Janeiro (Master's) (in Portuguese). Rio de Janeiro: Federal University of Rio de Janeiro.
- Samis, Alexandre R. (2006). "Minha Pátria é o Mundo Inteiro": Neno Vasco, o anarquismo e as estratégias sindicais nas primeiras décadas do século XX (Thesis) (in Portuguese). Niterói: Fluminense Federal University. ISBN 989951148X. OCLC 382406472.
