= 1917–1919 Brazil strike movement =

Brazilian industry and commerce strike

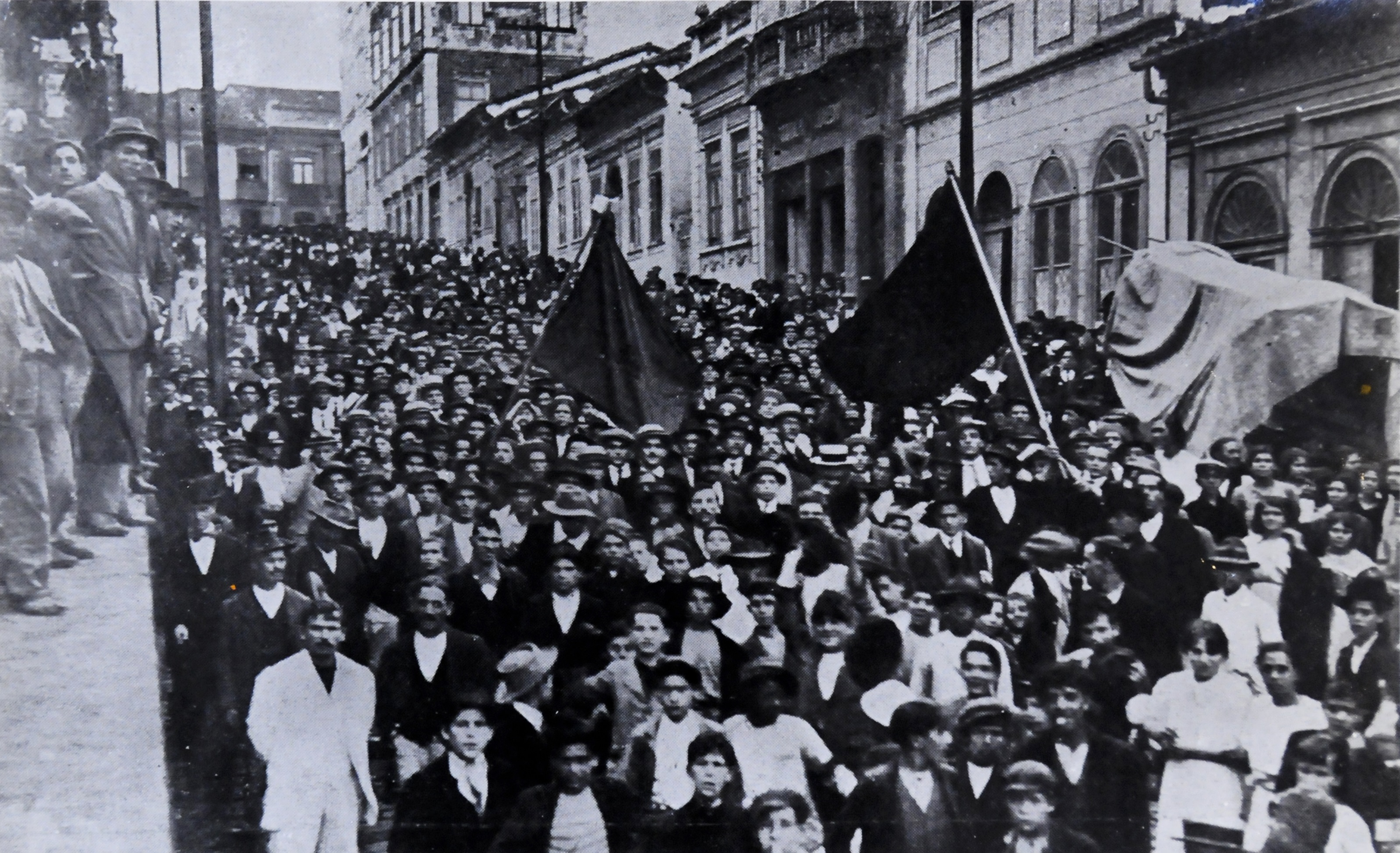
1917 general strike in São Paulo

1917–1919 Brazil strike movement was a Brazilian industry and commerce strike starting in July 1917 in São Paulo, during World War I, promoting by anarchist-inspired workers' organizations allied with the libertarian press. From 1917 to 1919, a large strike movement shook the First Brazilian Republic, concentrated in São Paulo and Rio de Janeiro. It culminated in several general strikes in 1917 and an attempted anarchist uprising in November 1918. The 1917 general strike is considered the first general strike in the labor history of Brazil, and marks the beginning of the period known as the five red years (quinquennio rosso).

== See also ==
- 1918 Rio de Janeiro anarchist insurrection
- 1978–1980 ABC Paulista strikes
- Biennio Rosso
- Revolutions of 1917–1923
