= Bademiya =

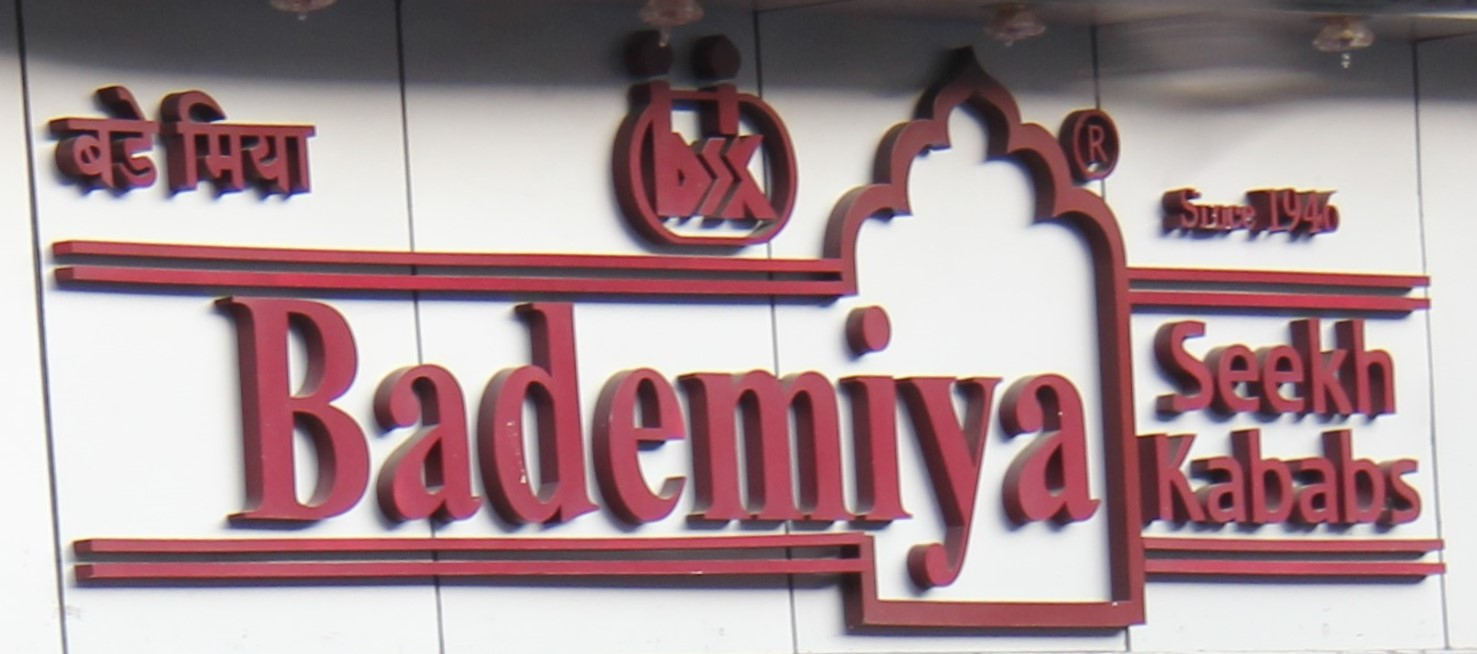

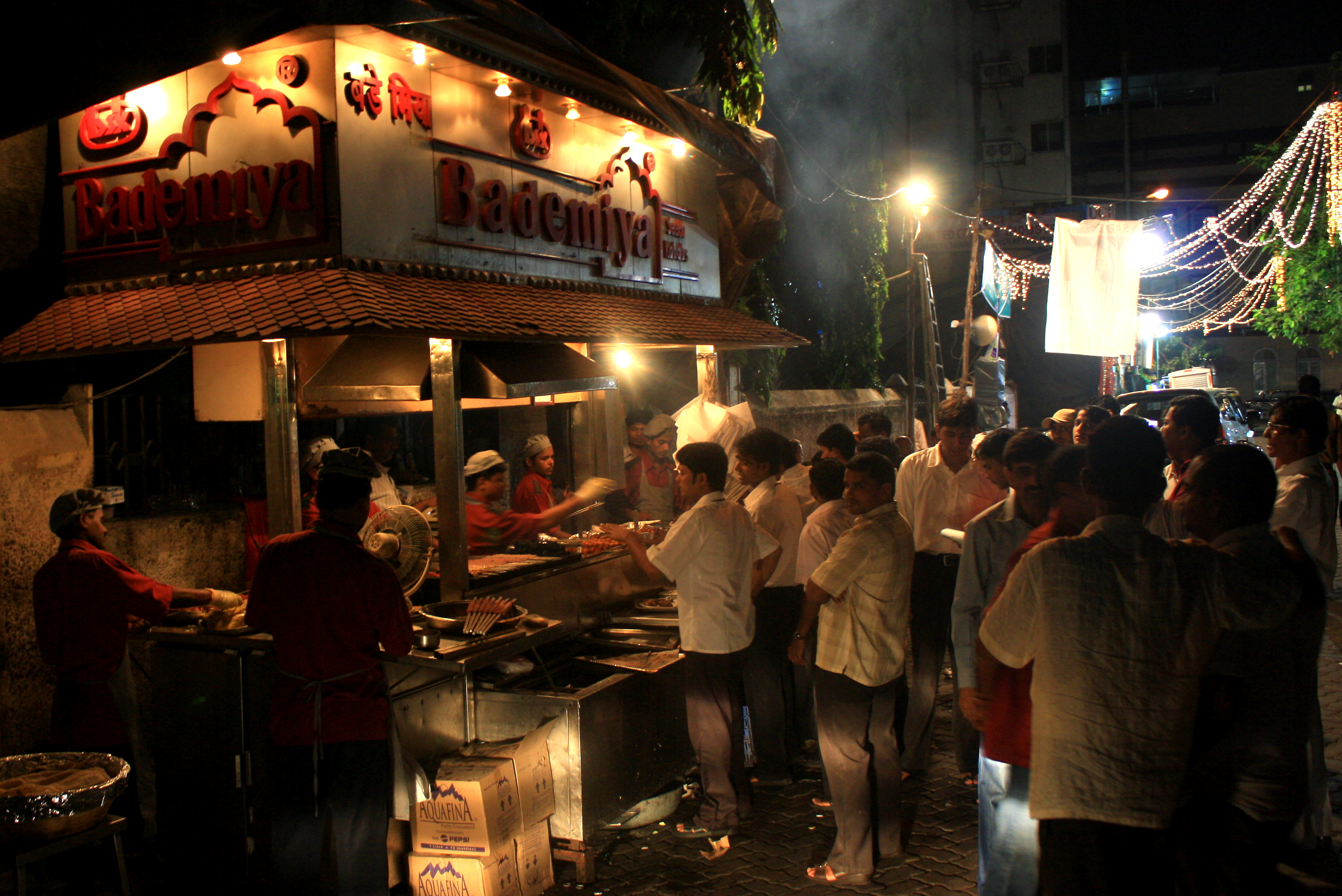
- Bademiya at Colaba

- Bademiya location in Mumbai

Restaurant information
- Established: 1 January 1946
- Owner: Mohammad Mazharul haque Mohammad Zahirul Haq Shaikh Mohammad Gause Shaikh Mohammad Jamaluddin Shaikh Mohammad Iftekhar Shaikh
- Previous owner: Mohammad Yaseen
- Food type: Mughlai
- Location: Apollo Bundar, Horniman Circle, Mohammad Ali Road, Mumbai, Maharashtra, 400039, India
- Coordinates: 18°55′18.9696″N 72°50′4.4628″E
- Reservations: No
- Website: Official website

Bademiya is an iconic food stall and restaurant chain in Mumbai, India. It was established in 1946 by Mohammad Yaseen as makeshift seekh kabab counter. The counter has now branched out into several restaurants, takeaway joint and a permanent food stall at the original location. The restaurant is a popular landmark and touristic attraction of Mumbai.

== History ==
Mohammad Yaseen (a.k.a. Bade Miya after starting the counter) was born in a small village in Bijnor district of Uttar Pradesh. Yaseen moved to Mumbai at the age of 13 and became a butcher. He also started supplying meat to hotels. In 1946 Fida Mohammed Adam Chisti, who was the religious Guru of Yaseen, gave him ₹20 (equivalent to ₹2,100 or US$21.90 in 2023) seed money to start the counter. Yaseen started the food counter at Apollo Bundar near Mumbai naval port as late-night snack option for naval officers living nearby. A Fine dining restaurant was later started at Horniman Circle. Bademiya is said to have popularized Seekh kabab in Mumbai. The food stall measures 10 X 4 feet and is situated behind The Taj Mahal Palace Hotel in Apollo Bundar, Mumbai. Bademiya had two sit-down restaurants in Apollo Bundar and at Horniman Circle.

== Location ==
Bademiya has three outlets. The first and most popular outlet is a food stall situated behind The Taj Mahal Palace Hotel in Apollo Bundar.

== See also ==
- Cafe Mondegar
