= Great Trial of 1922 =

The Great Trial of 1922 took place in March 1922 following the arrest of Mohandas K. Gandhi for sedition. He appeared in the Ahmedabad court, charged under section 124A of the Indian Penal Code, without counsel. He pleaded guilty to all charges and requested that he be given the maximum penalty.

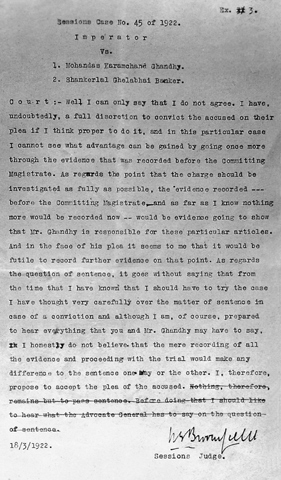
Court to Gandhi 1922
