= José Oiticica =

Brazilian writer and anarchist (1882–1957)

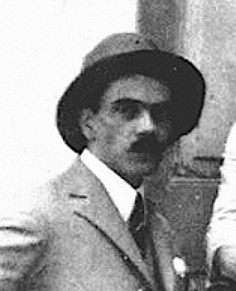
José Rodrigues Oiticica

José Rodrigues Oiticica (1882–1957), was a Brazilian playwright, poet, and prominent anarchist activist. He was founder and editor of the anarchist journal Ação direta (Direct Action), between 1946 until his death. He was the son of Brazilian senator Francisco de Paula Leite e Oiticica.
