= Wellington Pier, Mumbai =

Historic pier in Mumbai, India

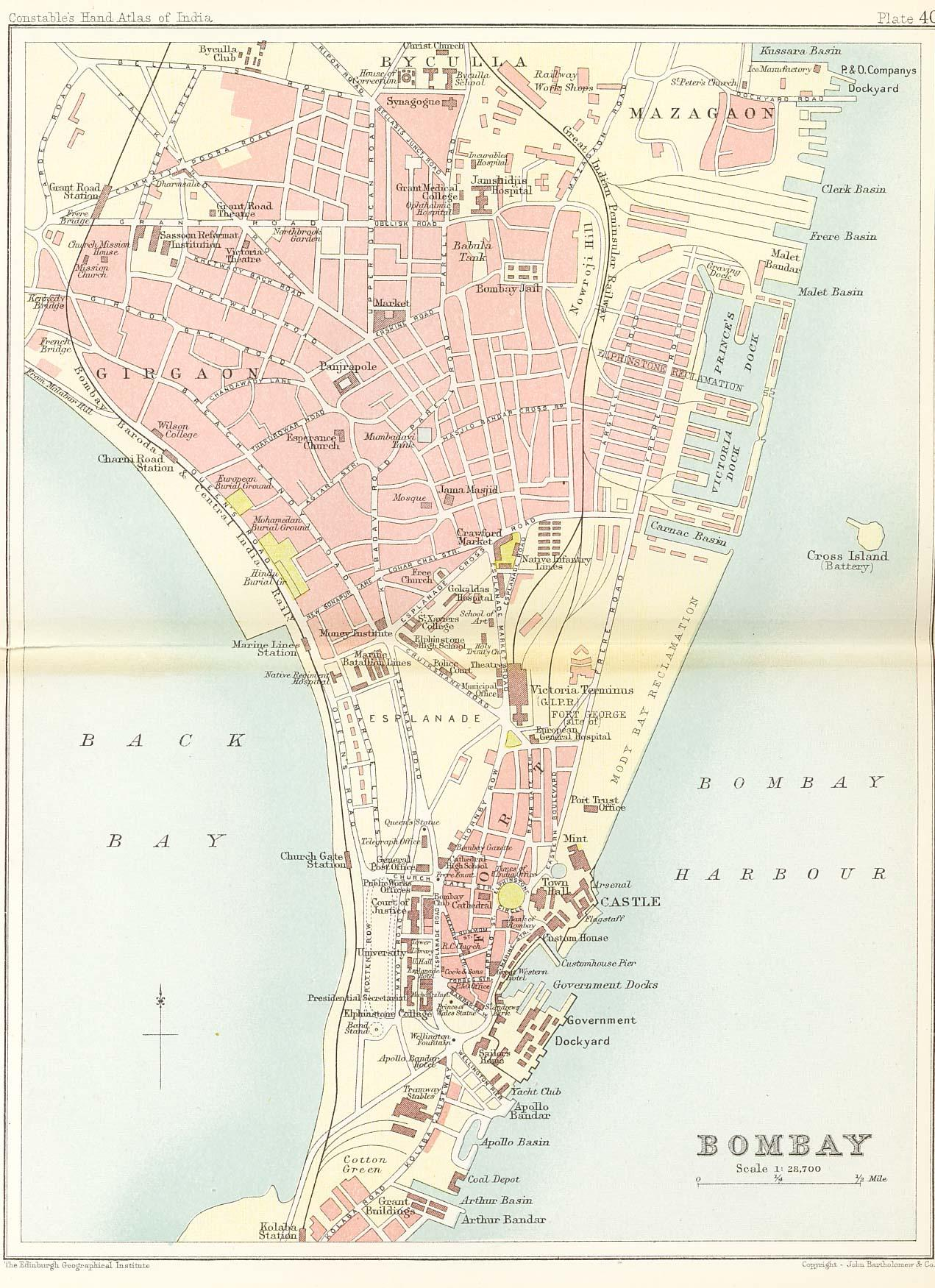
Apollo Bunder at the bottom of the map

Wellington Pier (formerly known as "Apollo Bunder") was an important pier for embarkation and disembarkation of passengers and goods in the city of Mumbai, India in the late 19th century. It is the location of the famed Gateway of India. The pier remains in operation today, used for ferry services to Gharapuri.

The first name for the pier, Apollo Bunder (bunder meaning port or more correctly, haven, borrowed from Hindi बंदर (bandar), from Classical Persian بندر (bandar)), was derived from the Palla fish that were sold at this spot in old times. This was corrupted to the Portuguese Pollem and finally to the English Apollo. This old name was popular among Indians and is still used today instead of Wellington Pier.

The pier was once a maze of wharves and docks where brisk trading took place. During the months of April and May the pier was particularly busy, with thousands of baskets of cotton being stacked ready for loading onto ships. There was frantic activity on the Cotton Green, at the Customs' House and at the hydraulic presses where the raw staple was baled for export. Since incoming passengers had to disembark together with their luggage at the Customs' House which was further north near the Mazgaon dock, passenger ships would make only a short stop at these piers in order to land the mail.

Beginning in 1900, the Administration started to reclaim the area in order build the Gateway of India, designed to welcome Emperor George V. The entire area now serves as a magnet for tourists visiting the gateway and nearby Taj building, going to the Elephanta Caves or coming in remembrance of the 26/11 attacks.

== Literature and popular culture ==
"Next day, they all went down to the sea, and there was a scene at the Apollo Bunder when Punch discovered that Meeta could not come too, and Judy learned that the ayah must be left behind. But Punch found a thousand fascinating things in the rope, block, and steam-pipe line on the big P. and O. Steamer, long before Meeta and the ayah had dried their tears." – Rudyard Kipling's short story, Baa Baa Black Sheep, published in 1888.

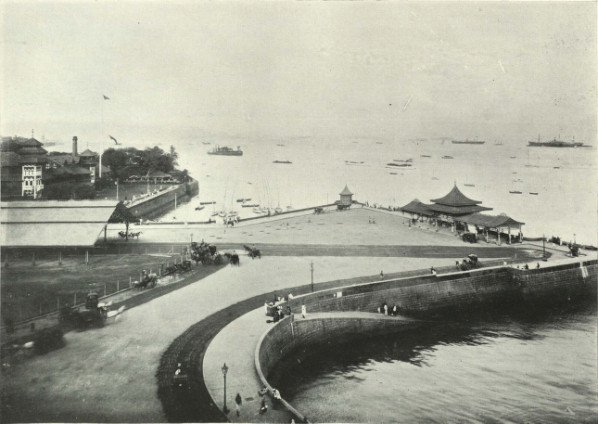
The Apollo Bunder - The Gate of India, c. 1905

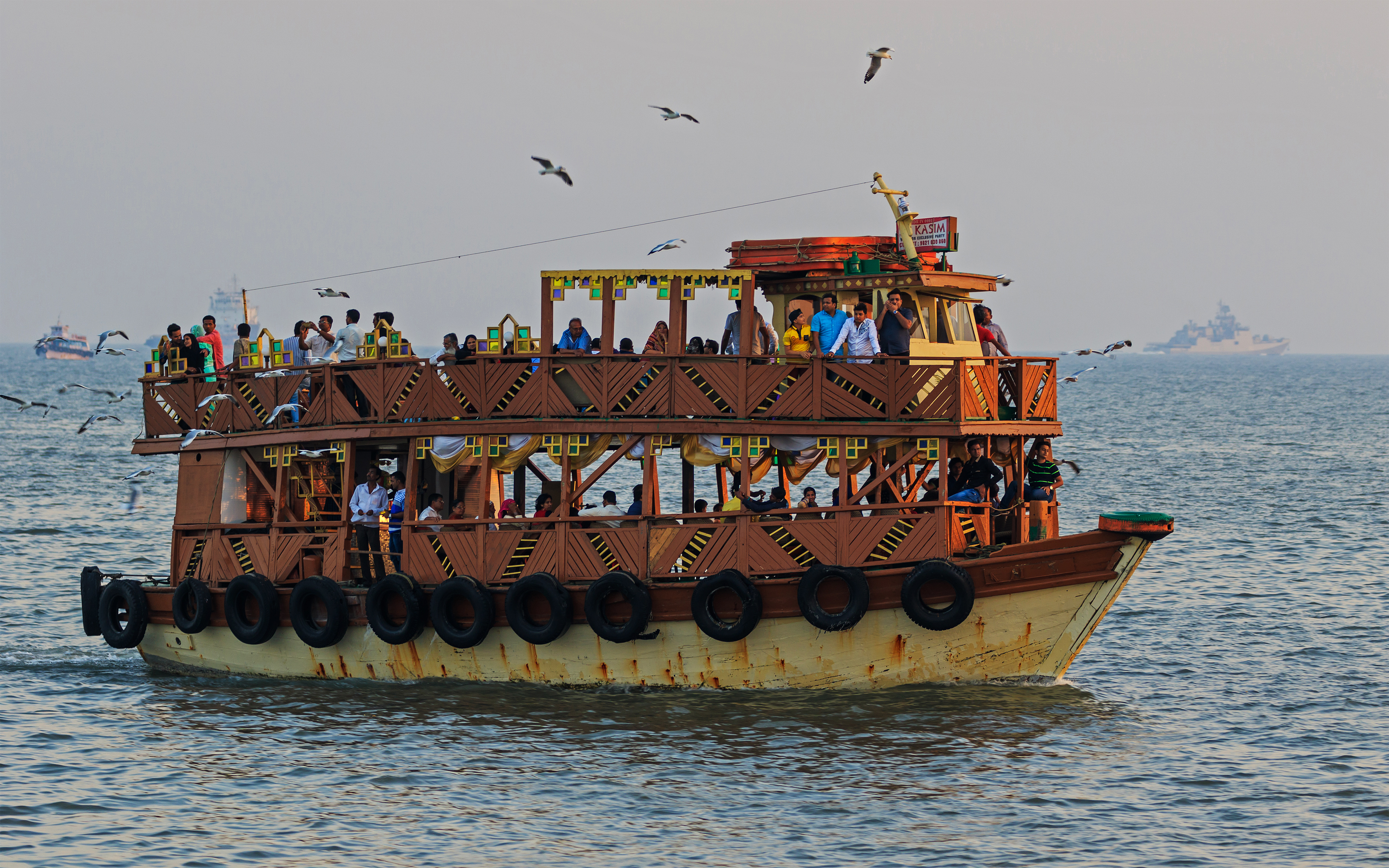
A boat at Apollo Bunder, 2016
