= Leon Trotsky =

Soviet politician and revolutionary (1879–1940)

- Лев Троцкий
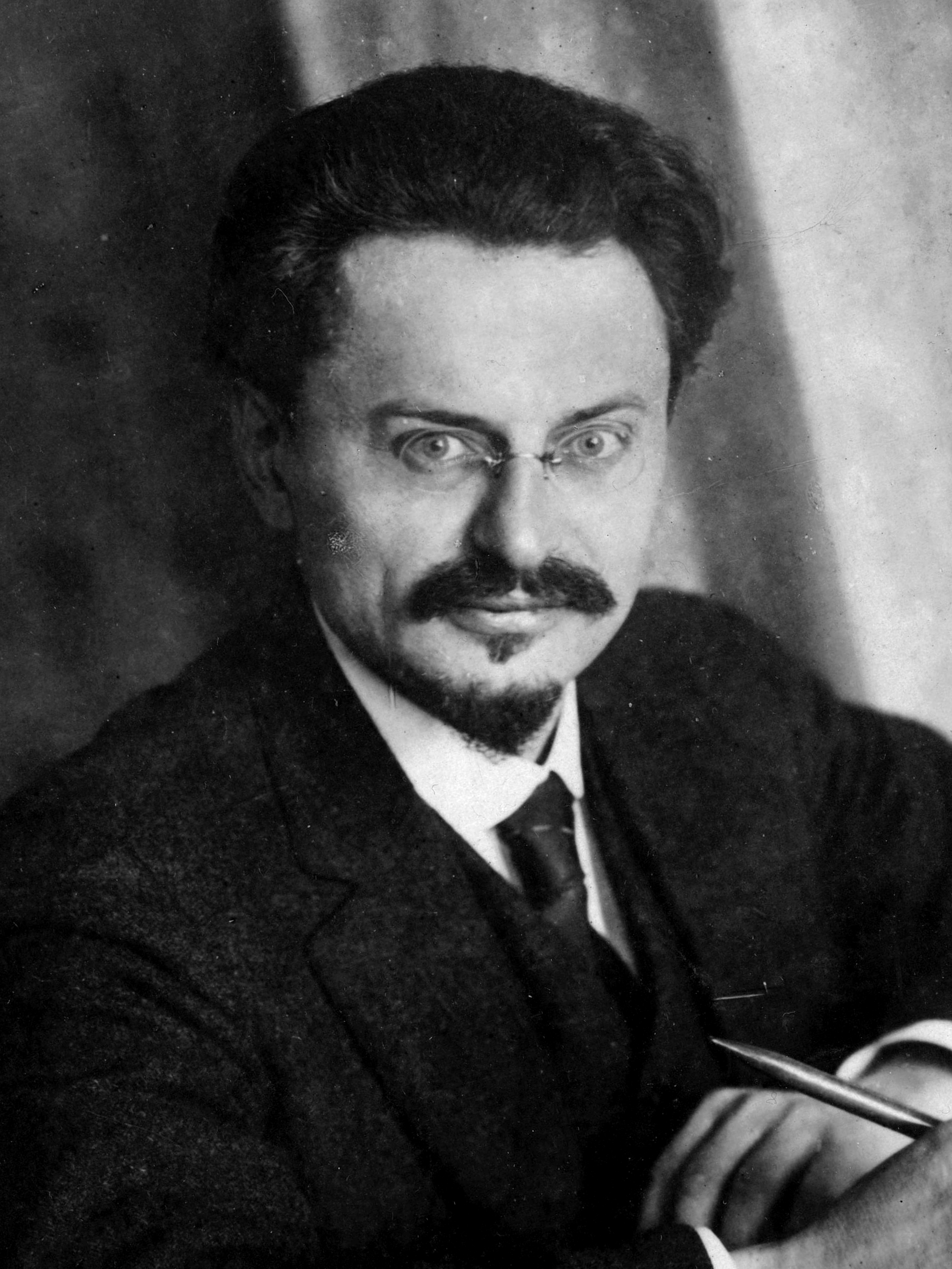
- Trotsky in 1918

People's Commissar for Military and Naval Affairs of the Soviet Union (Note: Trotsky was People's Commissar for Military Affairs from 14 March 1918 and People's Commissar for Naval Affairs from April 1918 before the offices were merged on 12 November 1923.)
- In office 14 March 1918 – 12 January 1925
- Premier: Vladimir Lenin; Alexei Rykov
- Preceded by: Nikolai Podvoisky
- Succeeded by: Mikhail Frunze

People's Commissar for Foreign Affairs of the Russian SFSR
- In office 8 November 1917 – 13 March 1918
- Premier: Vladimir Lenin
- Preceded by: Office established
- Succeeded by: Georgy Chicherin

Chairman of the Petrograd Soviet
- In office 20 September 1917 – 26 December 1919
- Preceded by: Nikolay Chkheidze
- Succeeded by: Grigory Zinoviev

Personal details
- Born: Lev Davidovich Bronstein; 7 November 1879 Yanovka, Russian Empire (now in Ukraine)
- Died: 21 August 1940 (aged 60) Mexico City, Mexico
- Cause of death: Assassination via ice axe wound
- Resting place: Leon Trotsky House Museum, Mexico City
- Citizenship: Russia (until 1922); Soviet Union (1922–1932); Stateless (from 1932)
- Party: Russian Social Democratic Labour Party (1902–1917); Mezhraiontsy (1917); All-Union Communist Party (Bolsheviks) (1918–1927)
- Spouses: Aleksandra Sokolovskaya (m. 1900; div. 1902); Natalia Sedova (m. 1903)
- Children: 4, including Zinaida, Lev and Sergei
- Nickname: Leyba
- Trotsky's voice Recorded 1920
- Central institution membership: 1917–1927: Full member, 6th–14th Politburo of AUCP(b); 1917–1927: Full member, 6th–14th Central Committee of AUCP(b); 1919–1920: Full member, 8th Orgburo of RCP(b); 1923–1924: Full member, 12th Orgburo of RCP(b); 1910–1912: Full member, 5th Central Committee of RSDLP; Other offices held: 1905: Chairman, St. Petersburg Soviet; 1917: Chairman, Petrograd Military Revolutionary Committee; 1917–1918: Member of the Russian Constituent Assembly for Novgorod; 1918: Chairman, Supreme Military Council; 1918–1925: Chairman, Revolutionary Military Council

Lev Davidovich Trotsky (Note: Russian: Лев Давидович Троцкий, romanized: Lev Davidovich Trotskiy, IPA: [ˈlʲef dɐˈvʲidəvʲɪtɕ ˈtrotskʲɪj]; Ukrainian: Лев Давидович Троцький; also transliterated Lyev, Trotski, Trotskii, Trotskiĭ, Trockij, and Trotzky.) (né Bronstein; (Note: Russian: Бронштейн, romanized: Bronshteyn, IPA: [brɐnʂˈtʲejn]) 7 November [O.S. 26 October] 1879 – 21 August 1940), better known as Leon Trotsky, (Note: /ˈtrɒtski/;) was a Russian revolutionary, Soviet politician, and political theorist. He was a key figure in the 1905 Revolution, the October Revolution of 1917, the Russian Civil War, and the establishment of the Soviet Union, from which he was exiled in 1929 before his assassination in 1940. Trotsky and Vladimir Lenin were widely considered the two most prominent figures in the Soviet state from 1917 until Lenin's death in 1924. Ideologically a Marxist and a Leninist, Trotsky's ideas and beliefs inspired a school of Marxism known as Trotskyism.

Trotsky joined the Russian Social Democratic Labour Party in 1898, being arrested and exiled to Siberia for his activities. In 1902 he escaped to London, where he met Lenin. Trotsky initially sided with the Mensheviks against Lenin's Bolsheviks in the party's 1903 schism, but declared himself non-factional in 1904. During the 1905 Revolution, Trotsky was elected chairman of the Saint Petersburg Soviet. He was again exiled to Siberia, but escaped in 1907 and lived abroad. After the February Revolution of 1917, Trotsky joined the Bolsheviks and was elected chairman of the Petrograd Soviet. He helped to lead the October Revolution, and as the People's Commissar for Foreign Affairs negotiated the Treaty of Brest-Litovsk, by which Russia withdrew from World War I. He served as People's Commissar for Military Affairs from 1918 to 1925, during which he built the Red Army and led it to victory in the civil war. In 1922 Lenin formed a bloc with Trotsky against the growing Soviet bureaucracy and proposed that he should become a deputy premier, but Trotsky declined. Beginning in 1923, Trotsky led the party's Left Opposition faction, which supported greater levels of industrialisation, voluntary collectivisation and party democratisation in a shared framework with the New Economic Policy.

After Lenin's death in 1924 and amidst the resulting power vacuum, Trotsky was politically outmanoeuvred by Joseph Stalin and sidelined. Trotsky was expelled from the Politburo in 1926 and from the party in 1927, exiled to Alma Ata in 1928 and deported from the USSR in 1929. He lived in Turkey, France, and Norway before settling in Mexico in 1937. In exile, Trotsky wrote polemics against Stalinism, advocating proletarian internationalism against Stalin's theory of socialism in one country. Trotsky's theory of permanent revolution held that the revolution could survive only if it spread to more advanced capitalist countries. In The Revolution Betrayed (1936), he argued that the Soviet Union had become a "degenerated workers' state", and in 1938 founded the Fourth International as an alternative to the Comintern. After being sentenced to death in absentia at the Moscow show trials in 1936, Trotsky was assassinated in 1940 in Mexico City by Ramón Mercader, a Stalinist agent.

Written out of official history under Stalin, Trotsky was one of the few of his rivals who were never politically rehabilitated by later Soviet leaders. He perceived his theoretical contributions as a continuation of orthodox Leninism against what he saw as the bureaucratic degeneration of the Soviet Union and Communist Party which occurred under Stalin's leadership. In the Western world, Trotsky emerged as a hero of the anti-Stalinist left for his defence of a more democratic, internationalist form of socialism as opposed to the official interpretation of Marxism-Leninism advocated by Stalin and the leadership of "actually existing socialist" states, and for his intellectual contributions to Marxism. While some of his wartime actions are controversial, such as his ideological defence of the Red Terror and violent suppression of the Kronstadt rebellion, scholarship ranks Trotsky's leadership of the Red Army highly among historical figures, and he is credited for his major involvement with the military, economic, cultural and political development of the Soviet Union.

== Childhood and family (1879–1895) ==
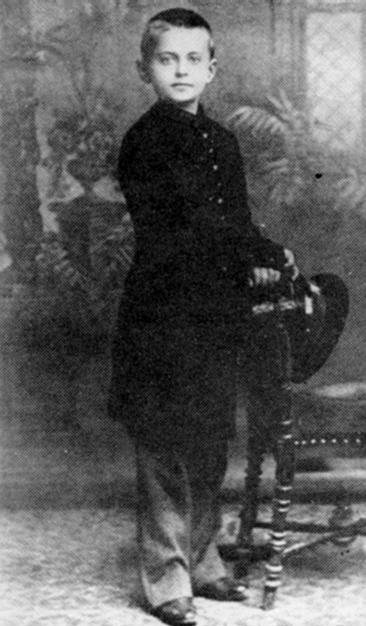
Trotsky in 1888

Lev Davidovich Bronstein was born into a wealthy but illiterate Jewish farming family on 7 November 1879 in Yanovka, then part of Kherson Governorate, Russian Empire, and now part of Ukraine. He was the fifth child of David Leontyevich Bronstein and Anna Lvovna (née Zhivotovskaya). Trotsky's younger sister, Olga, also became a Bolshevik and Soviet politician, and married her fellow-Bolshevik Lev Kamenev.

Some authors, notably Robert Service, have claimed that Trotsky's childhood first name was the Yiddish Leiba. However, the Trotskyist writer David North argued that this is an assumption based on Trotsky's Jewish heritage, lacking documentary evidence, especially as Yiddish was not spoken by his family. Both North and the historian Walter Laqueur stated that Trotsky's childhood name was Lyova, a standard Russian diminutive of Lev. North draws a parallel between the speculation and the disproportionate scrutiny of Trotsky's Jewish heritage. Instead of Yiddish, the family spoke a mixture of Russian and Ukrainian. Although he acquired good proficiency in French, English, and German, Trotsky stated in his autobiography My Life that he was truly fluent in only Russian and Ukrainian. Raymond Molinier has noted that Trotsky spoke fluent French.

David sent Trotsky to Odessa for education when the latter was eight years old. Trotsky enrolled at St Paul's Realschule, a Lutheran German-language school, which admitted students of various faiths and became increasingly Russified during his time there due to the Imperial government's Russification policy. Trotsky and his wife Natalia later registered their children as Lutheran, as Austrian law then required children to receive religious education "in the faith of their parents". Odessa, a bustling cosmopolitan port city, differed greatly from typical Russian cities and contributed to the development of young Trotsky's international outlook. He excelled academically, particularly in science and mathematics, and was a voracious reader, often disciplined for reading non-curriculum books during class.

== Early political activities and life (1896–1917) ==
=== Revolutionary activity and imprisonment (1896–1898) ===
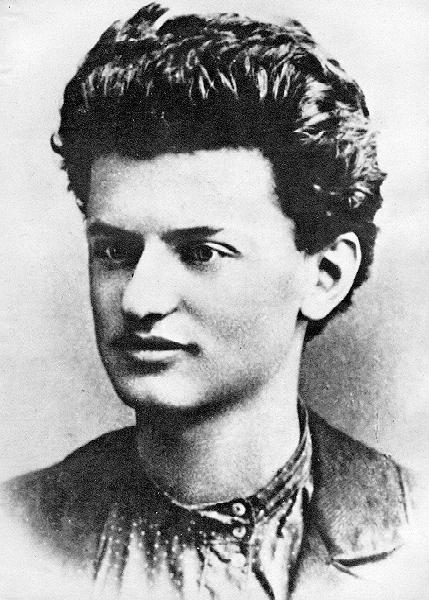
Trotsky in 1897

Trotsky became involved in revolutionary activities in 1896 after moving to the port town of Nikolayev (now Mykolaiv) on the Black Sea. Initially a narodnik (revolutionary agrarian socialist populist), he opposed Marxism but was converted by his future first wife, Aleksandra Sokolovskaya. He graduated from high school with first-class honours the same year. His father had intended him to become a mechanical engineer.

Trotsky briefly attended Odessa University, studying engineering and mathematics. A university colleague noted his exceptional mathematical talent. However, bored with his studies, he increasingly focused on political philosophy and underground revolutionary activities. He dropped out in early 1897 to help to organise the South Russian Workers' Union in Nikolayev. Using the name "Lvov", he wrote and printed leaflets, distributed revolutionary pamphlets, and popularised socialist ideas among industrial workers and students.

In January 1898 over 200 union members, including Trotsky, were arrested. He spent the next two years in prison awaiting trial, first in Nikolayev, then Kherson, Odessa, and finally Moscow. In Moscow, he encountered other revolutionaries, learnt of Lenin, and read Lenin's The Development of Capitalism in Russia. Two months into his imprisonment, the first Congress of the Russian Social Democratic Labour Party (RSDLP) was held (1–3 March 1898). From then on, Trotsky identified as an RSDLP member.

=== First marriage and Siberian exile (1899–1902) ===
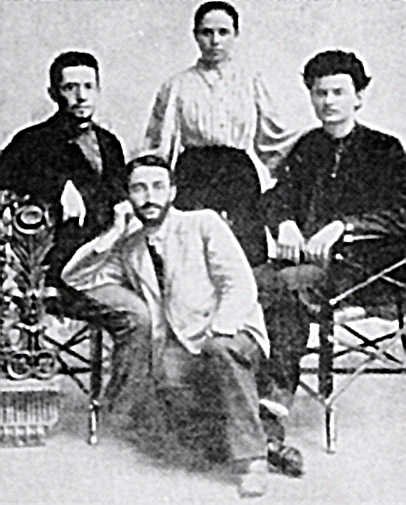
Trotsky's first wife Aleksandra Sokolovskaya (centre) with her brother (left), Trotsky (right), and Dr G. A. Ziv (bottom) in 1897

While imprisoned in Moscow in the summer of 1900, Trotsky married his fellow-Marxist Aleksandra Sokolovskaya (1872–1938) in a ceremony performed by a Jewish chaplain. In 1900 Trotsky was sentenced to four years of exile in Siberia. Due to their marriage, Trotsky and his wife were exiled together to Ust-Kut and Verkholensk in the Baikal region. They had two daughters, Zinaida (1901–1933) and Nina (1902–1928), both born in Siberia.

In Siberia, Trotsky studied history, philosophy, economics, sociology, and the works of Karl Marx to solidify his political stance. He became aware of internal party differences, particularly the debate between "economists", who focused on workers' economic improvements, and those who prioritised overthrowing the monarchy through a disciplined revolutionary party. The latter position was advocated by the London-based newspaper Iskra (The Spark), founded in 1900. Trotsky quickly sided with Iskra and began writing for it.

In the summer of 1902, urged by his wife, Trotsky escaped from Siberia hidden in a load of hay. Aleksandra later escaped with their daughters. Both daughters married and had children but died before their parents. Nina Nevelson died of tuberculosis in 1928. Zinaida Volkova, also suffering from tuberculosis and depression, followed her father into exile but committed suicide in Berlin in 1933. Aleksandra disappeared in 1935 during Stalin's Great Purge and was murdered by Soviet forces in 1938.

=== First emigration and second marriage (1902–1903) ===
Until this point, Trotsky had used his birth name, Lev (Leon) Bronstein. He adopted the surname "Trotsky"—reportedly the name of a jailer in the Odessa prison where he had been held—which he used for the rest of his life. This became his primary revolutionary pseudonym. After escaping Siberia, Trotsky moved to London, joining Georgi Plekhanov, Lenin, Julius Martov and other editors of Iskra. Writing under the pen name Pero ("quill" or "pen"), Trotsky soon became one of the paper's leading writers.

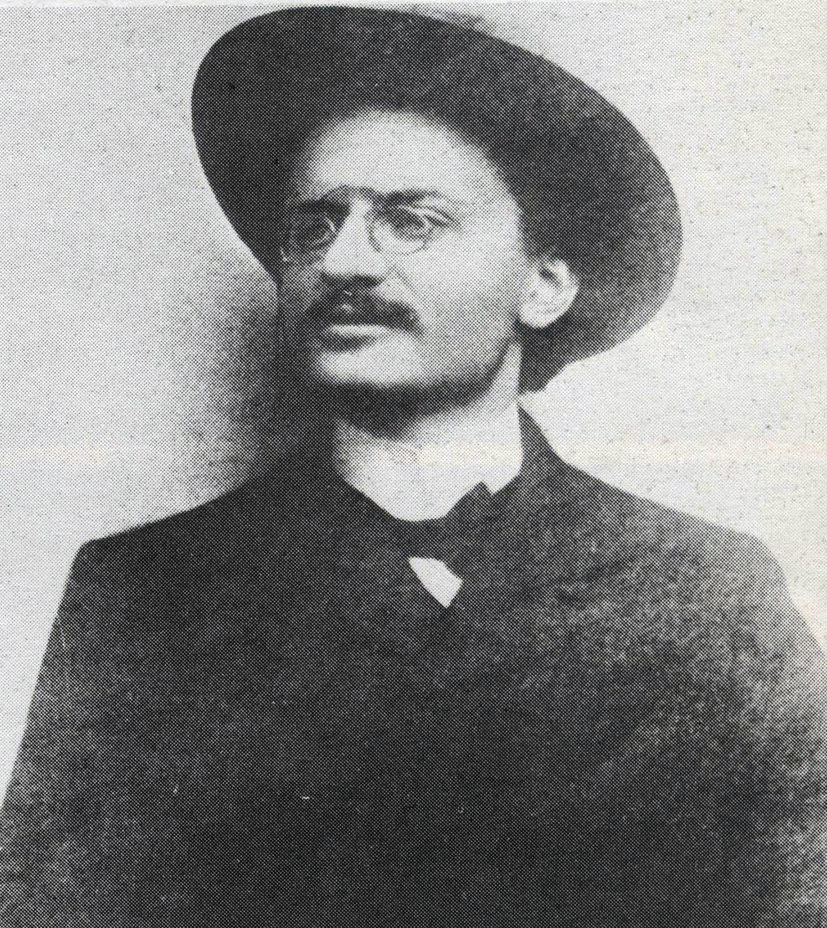
Trotsky in 1902

The six editors of Iskra were split between an "old guard" led by Plekhanov and a "new guard" led by Lenin and Martov. Lenin, seeking a majority against Plekhanov, expected the 23-year-old Trotsky to side with the new guard. In March 1903 Lenin proposed Trotsky's co-option to the editorial board:

I suggest to all the members of the editorial board that they co-opt 'Pero' as a member of the board on the same basis as other members. [...] We very much need a seventh member, both as a convenience in voting (six being an even number) and as an addition to our forces. 'Pero' has been contributing to every issue for several months now; he works, in general, most energetically for the Iskra; he gives lectures (in which he has been very successful). In the section of articles and notes on the events of the day, he will not only be very useful, but absolutely necessary. Unquestionably a man of rare abilities, he has conviction and energy, and he will go much farther.

Due to Plekhanov's opposition, Trotsky did not become a full board member but participated in an advisory capacity, earning Plekhanov's animosity.

In late 1902 Trotsky met Natalia Sedova (1882–1962), who soon became his companion. They married in 1903 and remained together until his death. They had two sons, Lev Sedov (1906–1938) and Sergei Sedov (1908–1937), both of whom predeceased their parents. Trotsky later explained that, for "citizenship" requirements after the 1917 revolution, he "took on the name of my wife" so his sons would not have to change their name. However, he never publicly or privately used the name "Sedov". Natalia Sedova sometimes signed her name "Sedova-Trotskaya".

=== Split with Lenin (1903–1904) ===
In August 1903 Iskra convened the RSDLP's Second Congress in London. Trotsky attended with other Iskra editors. After defeating the "economist" delegates, the congress addressed the Bund's desire for autonomy within the party.

Subsequently, the pro-Iskra delegates unexpectedly split. The initial dispute was organisational: Lenin and his supporters (the Bolsheviks) advocated for a smaller, highly organised party of committed members, while Martov and his supporters (the Mensheviks) favoured a larger, less disciplined party that included sympathisers. Trotsky and most Iskra editors supported Martov, while Plekhanov backed Lenin. During 1903–1904, allegiances shifted; Trotsky left the Mensheviks in September 1904, disagreeing with their insistence on an alliance with Russian liberals and their opposition to reconciliation with Lenin and the Bolsheviks.

From 1904 to 1917 Trotsky described himself as a "non-factional social democrat". He attempted to reconcile party factions, leading to clashes with Lenin and others. Trotsky later admitted he was wrong to oppose Lenin on party organisation. During this period, he developed his theory of permanent revolution and worked closely with Alexander Parvus (1904–1907). During their split Lenin referred to Trotsky as "Judas" (Iudushka, after a character in Mikhail Saltykov-Shchedrin's novel The Golovlyov Family), a "scoundrel", and a "swine".

=== 1905 revolution and trial (1905–1906) ===
Anti-government unrest culminated in Saint Petersburg on 3 January 1905 (O.S.), when a strike began at the Putilov Works. This escalated into a general strike, with 140,000 strikers in Saint Petersburg by 7 January 1905.

On Sunday, 9 January 1905 Father Georgi Gapon led a procession to the Winter Palace, ostensibly to petition Tsar Nicholas II. Accounts differ, but the Palace Guard fired on the demonstration, resulting in numerous deaths and injuries. This event, known as Bloody Sunday, intensified revolutionary fervour. Gapon's own biography suggests a degree of provocation by radicals within the crowd, a claim later echoed by some police records.

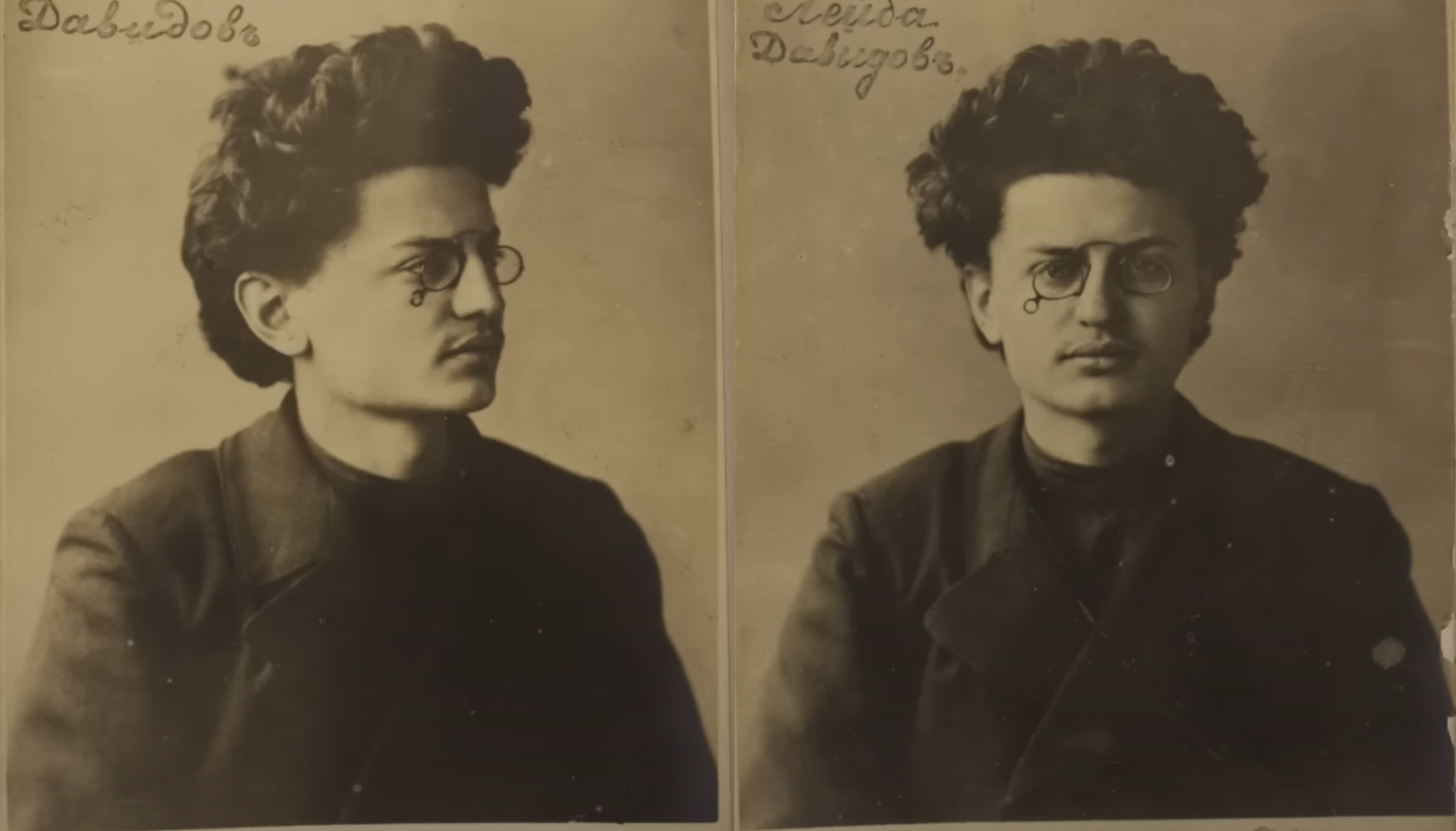
Police mugshots of Trotsky in 1905 after his arrest as a leader of the Saint Petersburg Soviet

Following Bloody Sunday, Trotsky secretly returned to Russia in February 1905 via Kiev. He wrote for an underground press in Kiev before moving to Saint Petersburg. There he worked with Bolsheviks like Leonid Krasin and the local Menshevik committee, pushing the latter in a more radical direction. A police raid in May forced him to flee to rural Finland, where he further developed his theory of permanent revolution.

On 19 September 1905, typesetters at Ivan Sytin's Moscow printing house struck for shorter hours and higher pay. By 24 September, 50 other Moscow printing shops joined. On 2 October, Saint Petersburg typesetters struck in solidarity. On 7 October railway workers of the Moscow–Kazan Railway also struck. Amidst this turmoil, Trotsky returned to Saint Petersburg on 15 October. He addressed the Saint Petersburg Soviet (Council) of Workers' Deputies at the Technological Institute, with an estimated 200,000 people gathered outside—about half the city's workers.

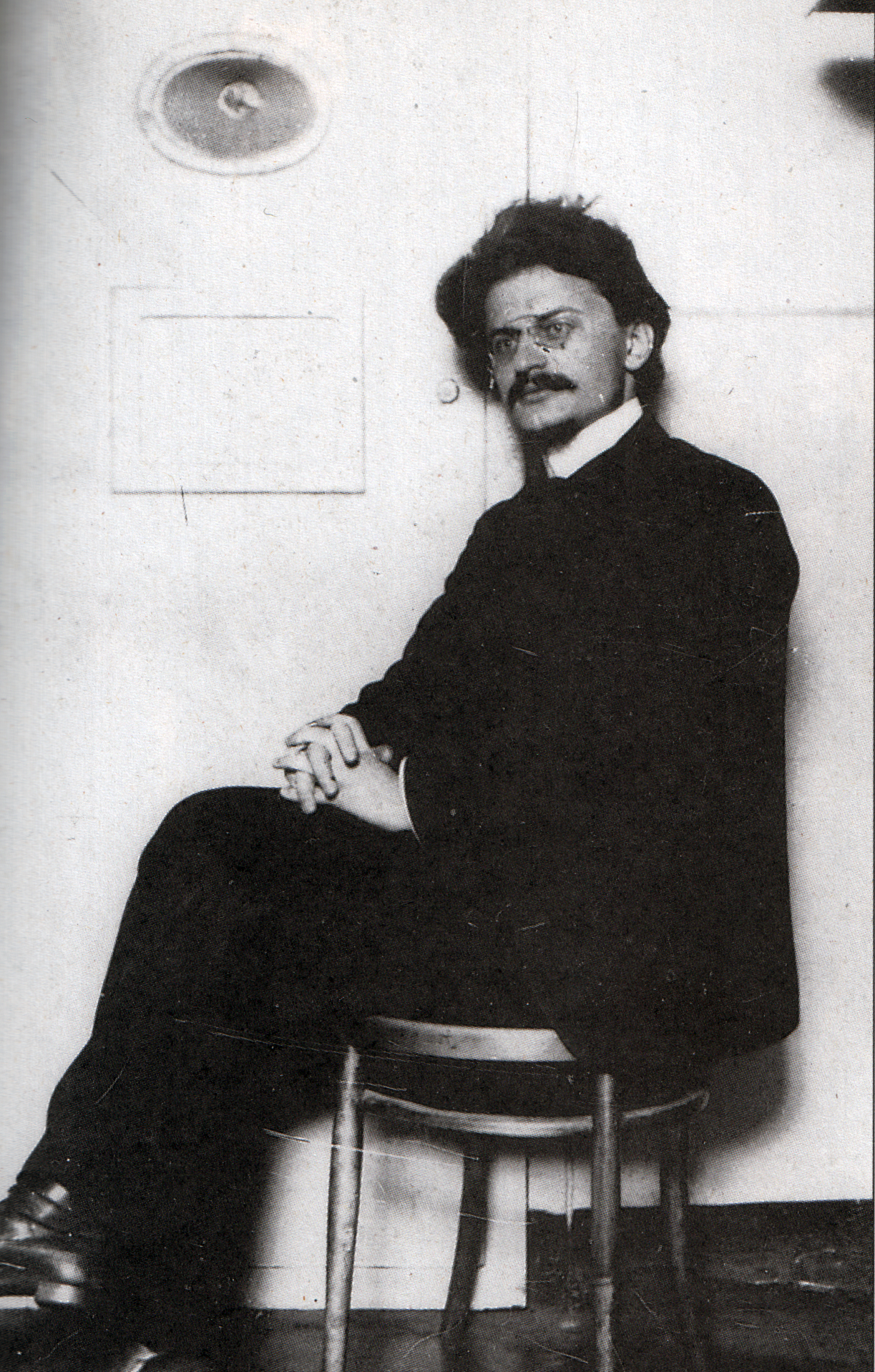
Trotsky in prison, awaiting trial, 1906

After his return, Trotsky and Parvus took over the newspaper Russian Gazette, increasing its circulation to 500,000. Trotsky also co-founded "Nachalo" ("The Beginning") with Parvus, Julius Martov, and other Mensheviks, which became a successful newspaper during the 1905 revolutionary climate in Saint Petersburg.

Before Trotsky's return, Mensheviks had independently conceived of an elected, non-party revolutionary body representing the capital's workers: the first Soviet. By Trotsky's arrival, the Saint Petersburg Soviet was functioning, headed by Khrustalyev-Nosar (Georgy Nosar, alias Pyotr Khrustalyov), a lawyer chosen as a compromise figure. Khrustalyev-Nosar became popular and was the Soviet's public face. Trotsky joined the Soviet as "Yanovsky" (after his birthplace) and was elected vice-chairman. He performed much of the practical work and, after Khrustalyev-Nosar's arrest on 26 November 1905, became its chairman. On 2 December, the Soviet issued a proclamation on Tsarist government debts:

The autocracy never enjoyed the confidence of the people and was never granted any authority by the people. We have therefore decided not to allow the repayment of such loans as have been made by the Tsarist government when openly engaged in a war with the entire people.

The following day, 3 December 1905, government troops surrounded the Soviet, and its deputies were arrested. Trotsky and other leaders were tried in 1906 for supporting an armed rebellion. On 4 October 1906 he was convicted and sentenced to internal exile in Siberia.

=== Second emigration (1907–1914) ===
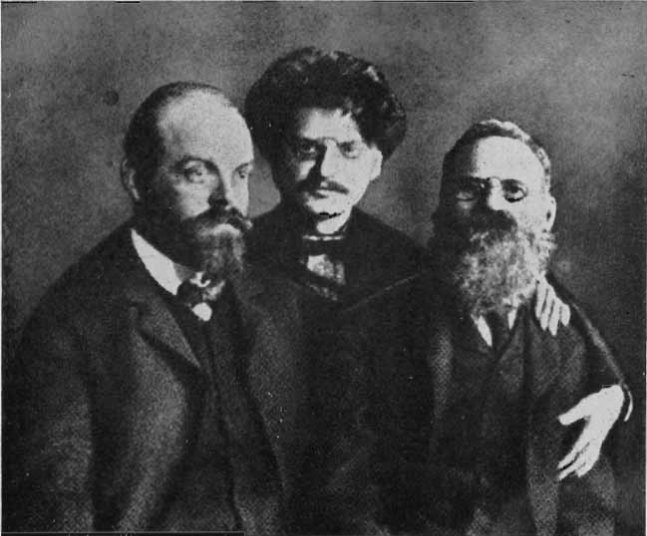
Trotsky (centre) with Alexander Parvus (left) and Leo Deutsch (right) in the Peter and Paul Fortress prison, Saint Petersburg, 1906

En route to exile in Obdorsk, Siberia, in January 1907, Trotsky escaped at Berezov and made his way to London. He attended the 5th Congress of the RSDLP. In October he moved to Vienna in Austria-Hungary. For the next seven years, he participated in the activities of the Austrian Social Democratic Party and occasionally the German Social Democratic Party. In Vienna he became close to Adolph Joffe, his friend for the next 20 years, who introduced him to psychoanalysis.

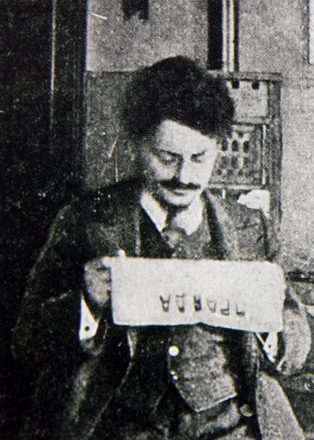
Trotsky reading Pravda in Vienna, c. 1910

In October 1908 Trotsky joined the editorial staff of Pravda ("Truth"), a bi-weekly, Russian-language social democratic paper for Russian workers, co-editing it with Joffe and Matvey Skobelev. It was smuggled into Russia. The paper appeared irregularly, with only five issues in its first year. Avoiding factional politics, it proved popular with Russian industrial workers. After the 1905–1907 revolution's failure, both Bolsheviks and Mensheviks experienced multiple splits. Funding for Pravda was scarce. Trotsky sought financial backing from the RSDLP Central Committee throughout 1909.

In 1910 a Bolshevik majority controlled the Central Committee. Lenin agreed to finance Pravda but required a Bolshevik co-editor. When various factions tried to reunite at the January 1910 RSDLP Central Committee meeting in Paris (over Lenin's objections), Trotsky's Pravda was made a party-financed 'central organ'. Lev Kamenev, Trotsky's brother-in-law, joined the editorial board from the Bolsheviks. However, unification attempts failed by August 1910. Kamenev resigned amid mutual recriminations. Trotsky continued publishing Pravda for another two years until it folded in April 1912.

The Bolsheviks launched a new workers' newspaper in Saint Petersburg on 22 April 1912, also named Pravda. Trotsky, upset by what he saw as the usurpation of his newspaper's name, wrote a bitter letter to Nikolay Chkheidze, a Menshevik leader, in April 1913, denouncing Lenin and the Bolsheviks. Though he quickly moved past the disagreement, the letter was intercepted by the Okhrana (secret police) and archived. After Lenin's death in 1924, Trotsky's opponents within the Communist Party publicised the letter to portray him as Lenin's enemy.

The 1910s were a period of heightened tension within the RSDLP. A major disagreement between Trotsky and the Mensheviks on one side, and Lenin on the other, concerned "expropriations"—armed robberies of banks and businesses by Bolshevik groups to fund the Party. These actions, banned by the 5th Congress, were continued by Bolsheviks.

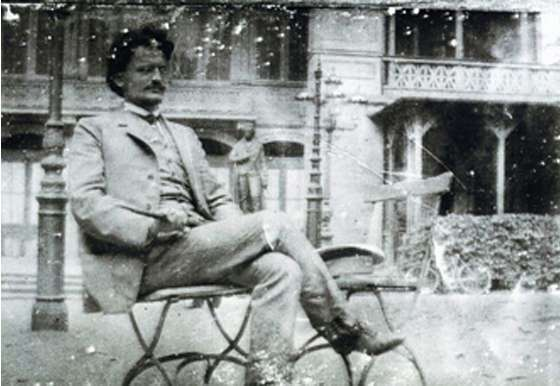
Trotsky in Vienna, c. 1907–1914

In January 1912 most of the Bolshevik faction, led by Lenin, held a conference in Prague, broke away from the RSDLP, and formed the Russian Social Democratic Labour Party (Bolsheviks). In response, Trotsky organised a "unification" conference of social democratic factions in Vienna in August 1912 (the "August Bloc") to reunite Bolsheviks and Mensheviks, but this attempt was largely unsuccessful.

In Vienna, Trotsky published articles in radical Russian and Ukrainian newspapers like Kievskaya Mysl, using pseudonyms such as "Antid Oto", a name chosen randomly from an Italian dictionary. Trotsky joked he "wanted to inject the Marxist antidote into the legitimate newspapers". In September 1912 Kievskaya Mysl sent him to the Balkans as its war correspondent, where he covered the two Balkan Wars for the next year. There, Trotsky chronicled ethnic cleansing carried out by the Serbian army against Albanian civilians. He became a close friend of Christian Rakovsky, later a leading Soviet politician and Trotsky's ally. On 3 August 1914, at the outbreak of World War I, with Austria-Hungary fighting the Russian Empire, Trotsky was forced to flee Vienna for neutral Switzerland to avoid arrest as a Russian émigré.

=== World War I (1914–1917) ===
World War I caused a sudden realignment within the RSDLP and other European social democratic parties over issues of war, revolution, pacifism, and internationalism. The RSDLP split into "defeatists" and "defencists". Lenin, Trotsky, and Martov advocated various internationalist anti-war positions, viewing defeat for their own country's ruling class as a "lesser evil" and opposing all imperialists in the war. "Defencists" like Plekhanov supported the Russian government to some extent. Trotsky's former colleague Parvus, now a defencist, sided so strongly against Russia that he wished for a German victory. In Switzerland, Trotsky briefly worked with the Swiss Socialist Party, prompting it to adopt an internationalist resolution. He wrote The War and the International, opposing the war and the pro-war stance of European social democratic parties, especially the German party.

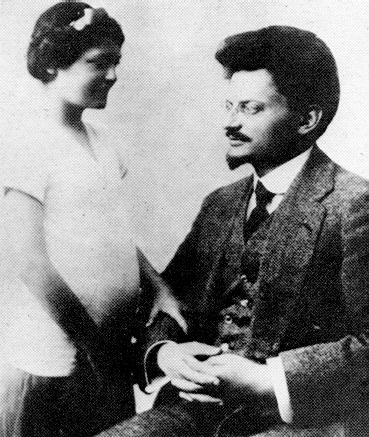
Trotsky with his daughter Nina in 1915

As a war correspondent for Kievskaya Mysl, Trotsky moved to France on 19 November 1914. In January 1915 in Paris he began editing Nashe Slovo ("Our Word"), an internationalist socialist newspaper, initially with Martov (who soon resigned as the paper moved left). He adopted the slogan "peace without indemnities or annexations, peace without conquerors or conquered". Lenin advocated Russia's defeat and demanded a complete break with the Second International.

Trotsky attended the Zimmerwald Conference of anti-war socialists in September 1915, advocating a middle course between those like Martov, who would stay in the Second International, and those like Lenin, who would break from it and form a Third International. The conference adopted Trotsky's proposed middle line. Lenin, initially opposed, eventually voted for Trotsky's resolution to avoid a split among anti-war socialists.

In September 1916 Trotsky was deported from France to Spain for his anti-war activities. Spanish authorities, not wanting him, deported him to the United States on 25 December 1916. He arrived in New York City on 13 January 1917, staying for over two months at 1522 Vyse Avenue in the Bronx. In New York he wrote articles for the local Russian-language socialist newspaper Novy Mir and, in translation, for the Yiddish-language daily Der Forverts ("Forward"). He also gave speeches to Russian émigrés.

Trotsky was in New York City when the February Revolution of 1917 led to the abdication of Tsar Nicholas II. He left New York aboard SS Kristianiafjord on 27 March 1917, but his ship was intercepted by the Royal Navy at Halifax, Nova Scotia. Trotsky was arrested and detained for a month at the Amherst Internment Camp in Nova Scotia. In the camp, he befriended workers and sailors among his fellow inmates, describing his month there as "one continual mass meeting". His speeches and agitation angered German inmates, who complained to the camp commander, Colonel Morris, about Trotsky's "anti-patriotic" attitude. Morris subsequently forbade Trotsky from making public speeches, leading to 530 prisoners protesting and signing a petition against the decision. In Russia, after initial hesitation and under pressure from workers' and peasants' Soviets, Foreign Minister Pavel Milyukov demanded Trotsky's release as a Russian citizen. The British government freed him on 29 April 1917.

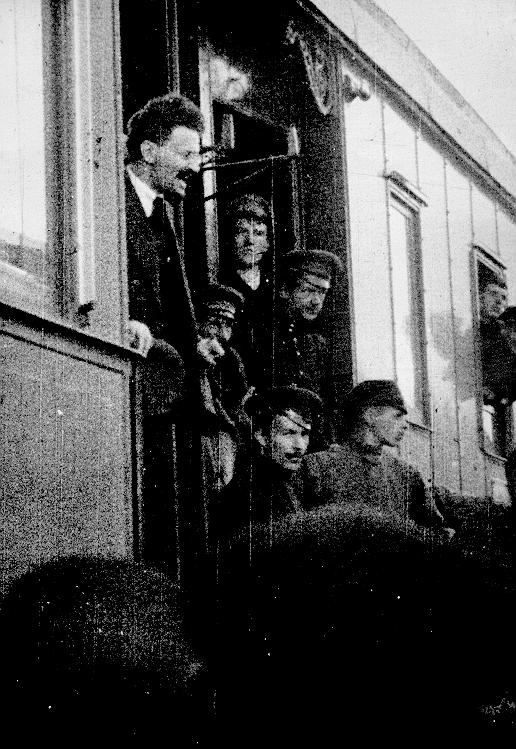
Trotsky arriving in Petrograd by train in May 1917

He reached Russia on 17 May 1917. Upon his return, Trotsky largely agreed with the Bolshevik position but did not immediately join them. Russian social democrats were split into at least six groups, and the Bolsheviks awaited the next party Congress to decide on mergers. Trotsky temporarily joined the Mezhraiontsy, a regional social democratic organisation in Petrograd, becoming one of its leaders. At the First Congress of Soviets in June, he was elected a member of the first All-Russian Central Executive Committee (VTsIK) from the Mezhraiontsy faction.

After an unsuccessful pro-Bolshevik uprising in Petrograd in July (the July Days), Trotsky was arrested on 7 August 1917. He was released 40 days later following the failed counter-revolutionary uprising by Lavr Kornilov. After the Bolsheviks gained a majority in the Petrograd Soviet, Trotsky was elected its chairman on 8 October [O.S. 25 September] 1917. He sided with Lenin against Grigory Zinoviev and Lev Kamenev when the Bolshevik Central Committee discussed staging an armed uprising, and he led the efforts to overthrow the Russian Provisional Government headed by the socialist Alexander Kerensky.

Joseph Stalin wrote the following summary of Trotsky's role in 1917 in Pravda on 6 November 1918:

All practical work in connection with the organization of the uprising was done under the immediate direction of Comrade Trotsky, the President of the Petrograd Soviet. It can be stated with certainty that the Party is indebted primarily and principally to Comrade Trotsky for the rapid going over of the garrison to the side of the Soviet and the efficient manner in which the work of the Military Revolutionary Committee was organized.

Although this passage was quoted in Stalin's book The October Revolution (1934), it was expunged from Stalin's Works (1949).

After the success of the October Revolution on 7–8 November 1917, Trotsky led efforts to repel a counter-attack by Cossacks under General Pyotr Krasnov and other troops loyal to the overthrown Provisional Government at Gatchina. Allied with Lenin, he defeated attempts by other Bolshevik Central Committee members (Zinoviev, Kamenev, Rykov, etc.) to share power with other moderate socialist parties. Trotsky advocated for a predominantly Bolshevik government and was reluctant to recall Mensheviks as partners after their voluntary withdrawal from the Congress of Soviets. However, he released several socialist ministers from prison. Neither Trotsky nor his colleagues in 1917 initially wished to suppress these parties entirely; the Bolsheviks reserved vacant seats in the Soviets and the Central Executive Committee for these parties in proportion to their vote share at the Congress. Concurrently, prominent Left Socialist Revolutionaries assumed positions in Lenin's government, leading commissariats such as agriculture (Andrei Kolegayev), property (Vladimir Karelin), justice (Isaac Steinberg), posts and telegraphs (Prosh Proshian), and local government (Vladimir Trutovsky). According to Deutscher, Menshevik and Social Revolutionary demands for a coalition government included disarming Bolshevik detachments and excluding Lenin and Trotsky, which was unacceptable even to moderate Bolshevik negotiators like Kamenev and Sokolnikov. By the end of 1917 Trotsky was unquestionably the second-most-powerful man in the Bolshevik Party after Lenin, overshadowing Zinoviev, who had been Lenin's top lieutenant for the previous decade.

== Russian Revolution and aftermath ==
=== Commissar for Foreign Affairs and Brest-Litovsk (1917–1918) ===
After the Bolsheviks seized power, Trotsky became People's Commissar for Foreign Affairs. He published the secret treaties previously signed by the Triple Entente, which detailed plans for post-war reallocation of colonies and redrawing state borders, including the Sykes–Picot Agreement. This revelation on 23 November 1917 caused considerable embarrassment to Britain and France.

==== Brest-Litovsk ====
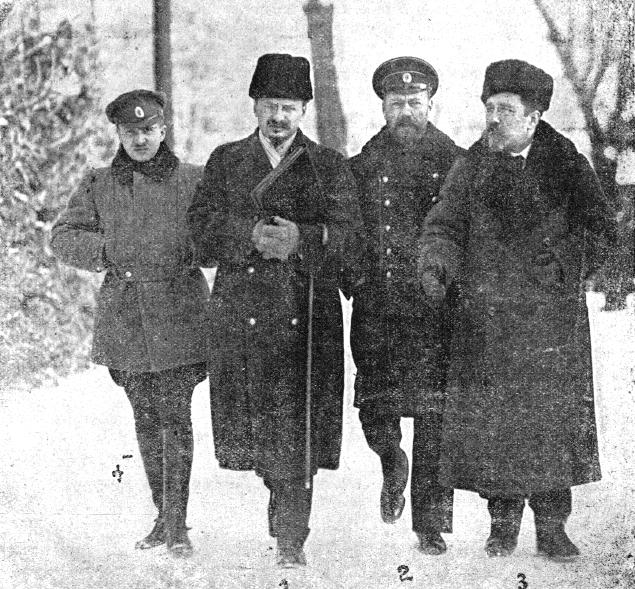
Trotsky and Lev Kamenev at the Brest-Litovsk negotiations, c. 1917–1918

In preparation for peace talks with the Central Powers, Trotsky appointed his old friend Adolph Joffe to represent the Bolsheviks. When the Soviet delegation learned that Germany and Austria-Hungary planned to annex Polish territory, establish a rump Polish state, and turn the Baltic provinces into client states ruled by German princes, the talks were recessed for 12 days. The Soviets hoped that, given time, their allies would join the negotiations or that the Western European proletariat would revolt; thus, prolonging negotiations was their best strategy. As Trotsky wrote, "To delay negotiations, there must be someone to do the delaying". Consequently, Trotsky replaced Joffe as head of the Soviet delegation at Brest-Litovsk from 22 December 1917 to 10 February 1918.

The Soviet government was divided. Left Communists, led by Nikolai Bukharin, believed no peace was possible between a Soviet republic and a capitalist empire, advocating a revolutionary war for a pan-European Soviet republic. They cited early Red Army successes against Polish forces, White forces, and Ukrainian forces as proof of its capability, especially with propaganda and asymmetrical warfare. They were willing to negotiate to expose German imperial ambitions but opposed signing any peace treaty, favouring a revolutionary war if faced with a German ultimatum. This view was shared by the Left Socialist Revolutionaries, then junior partners in the coalition government.

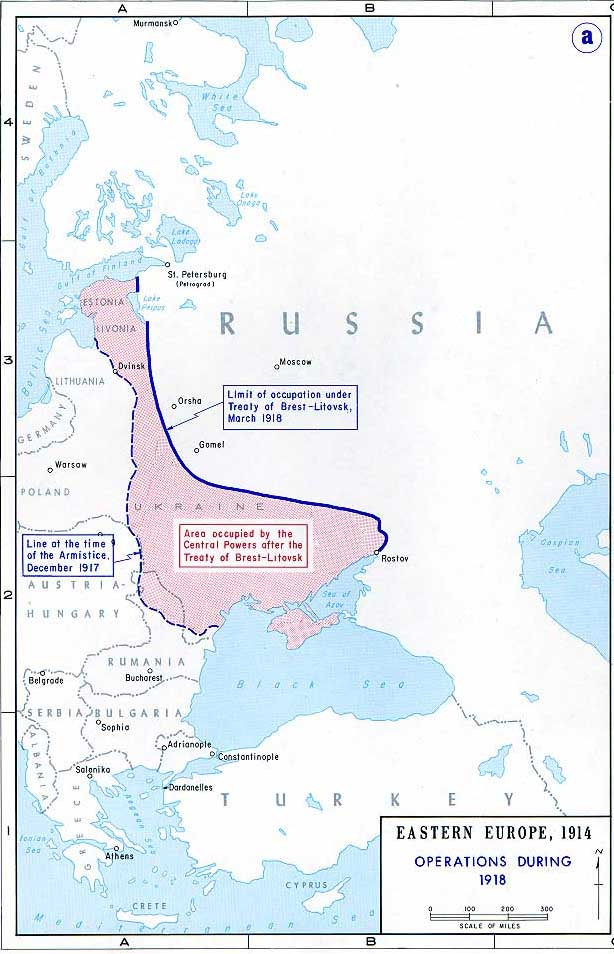
Territory lost by Russia under the Treaty of Brest-Litovsk

Lenin, initially hopeful for a swift European revolution, concluded that the German Imperial government remained strong and that, without a robust Russian military, armed conflict would lead to the Soviet government's collapse. He agreed a pan-European revolution was the ultimate solution but prioritised Bolshevik survival. From January 1918, he advocated signing a separate peace treaty if faced with a German ultimatum. Trotsky's position was between these factions. He acknowledged the old Russian army's inability to fight:

That we could no longer fight was perfectly clear to me and that the newly formed Red Guard and Red Army detachments were too small and poorly trained to resist the Germans.

However, he agreed with the Left Communists that a separate peace treaty would be a severe morale and material blow, negating recent successes, reviving suspicions of Bolshevik-German collusion, and fuelling internal resistance. He argued that a German ultimatum should be refused, which might trigger an uprising in Germany or inspire German soldiers to disobey orders if an offensive was a naked land grab. Trotsky wrote in 1925:

We began peace negotiations in the hope of arousing the workmen's party of Germany and Austria-Hungary as well as of the Entente countries. For this reason we were obliged to delay the negotiations as long as possible to give the European workman time to understand the main fact of the Soviet revolution itself and particularly its peace policy. But there was the other question: Can the Germans still fight? Are they in a position to begin an attack on the revolution that will explain the cessation of the war? How can we find out the state of mind of the German soldiers, how to fathom it?

In a letter to Lenin before 18 January 1918, Trotsky outlined his "no war, no peace" policy: announce war termination and demobilisation without signing a treaty, placing the fate of Poland, Lithuania, and Courland on the German working people. He believed Germany would find it difficult to attack due to internal conditions and opposition from various German political factions. Lenin initially responded on 18 January: "Stalin has just arrived; we will look into the matter with him and let you have a joint answer right away" and "please adjourn proceedings and leave for Petrograd. Send a reply; I will wait. Lenin, Stalin". Trotsky, sensing disagreement, returned to Petrograd. During their debate, Lenin concluded: "In any case, I stand for the immediate signing of peace; it is safer."

On 10 February 1918 Trotsky and the Russian delegation withdrew from peace talks, declaring an end to the war on Russia's side without signing a peace treaty. Privately, Trotsky had expressed willingness to relent to peace terms if Germany resumed its offensive, albeit with moral dissent. Germany resumed military operations on 18 February. The Red Army detachments proved no match for the German army. On the evening of 18 February, Trotsky and his supporters abstained in a Central Committee vote, and Lenin's proposal to accept German terms was approved 7–4. The Soviet government sent a radiogram accepting the final Brest-Litovsk terms.

Germany did not respond for three days, continuing its offensive. The response on 21 February contained such harsh terms that even Lenin briefly considered fighting. However, the Central Committee again voted 7–4 on 23 February to accept. The Treaty of Brest-Litovsk was signed on 3 March and ratified on 15 March 1918. Closely associated with the previous "no war, no peace" policy, Trotsky resigned as Commissar for Foreign Affairs.

=== Head of the Red Army (Spring 1918) ===
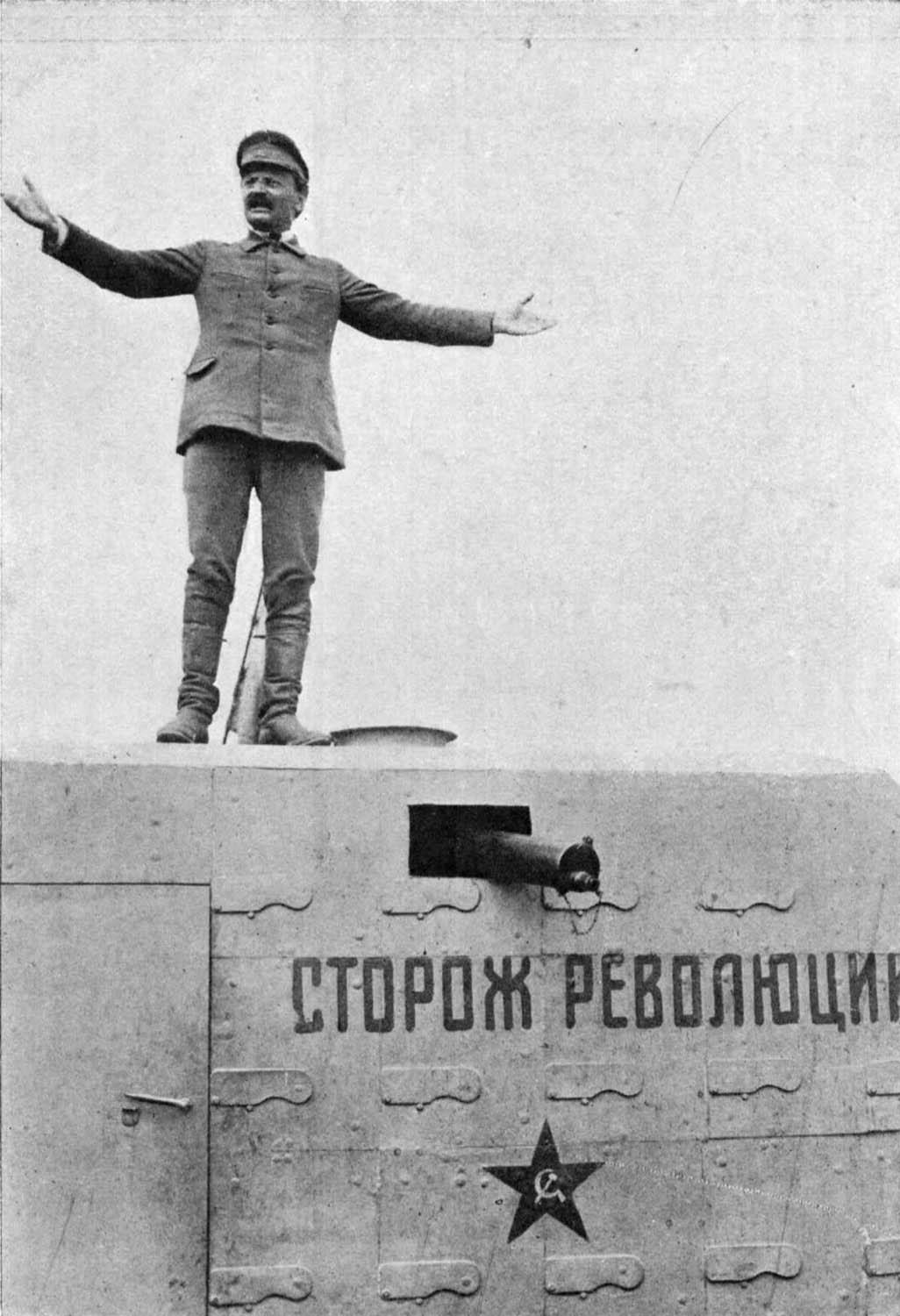
Trotsky speaks from his armoured train during the civil war in 1920.

On 13 March 1918, Trotsky's resignation as Foreign Affairs Commissar was accepted. He was appointed People's Commissar of Army and Navy Affairs, replacing Podvoisky, and chairman of the Supreme Military Council. The post of commander-in-chief was abolished, giving Trotsky full control of the Red Army, responsible only to the Communist Party leadership, whose Left Socialist Revolutionary allies had left the government over the treaty. The entire Bolshevik Red Army leadership, including the former Defence Commissar Nikolai Podvoisky and commander-in-chief Nikolai Krylenko, vigorously protested against Trotsky's appointment and eventually resigned. They believed the Red Army should consist only of dedicated revolutionaries, rely on propaganda and force, and have elected officers. They viewed former imperial officers as potential traitors. Their views remained popular, and their supporters, including Podvoisky (who became one of Trotsky's deputies), were a constant source of opposition. Discontent with Trotsky's policies of strict discipline, conscription, and reliance on supervised non-Communist military experts led to the Military Opposition, active within the Party in late 1918–1919.

Trotsky also expressed support for the Support for the Committee for Aid and Wounded Red Army Men (1920). He endorsed a number of measures to improve medical oversight and the living conditions of Red Army soldiers. This included his support for establishing joint workers-peasants committees for fraternal aid and facilitating a large participation of women in medical work during the Civil War.

=== Civil War (1918–1920) ===
==== 1918 ====
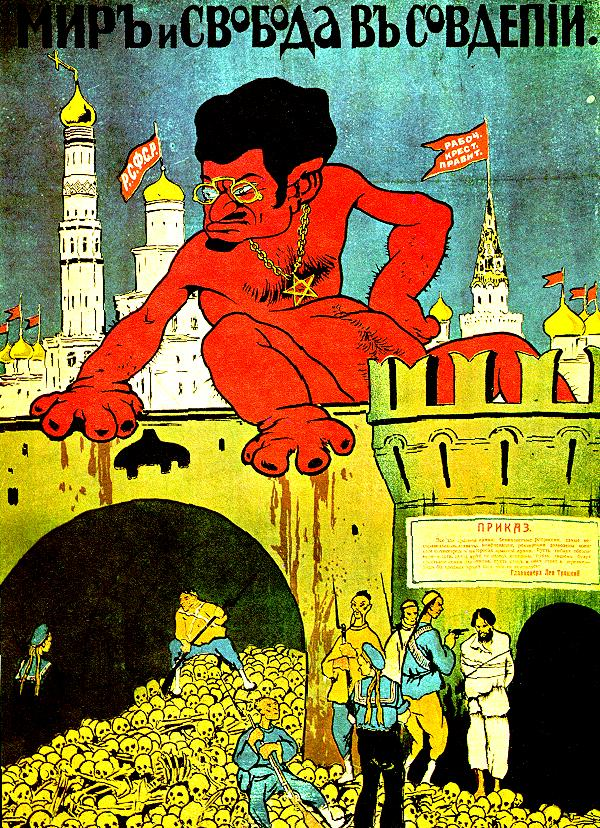
An antisemitic 1919 White Army propaganda poster depicting Trotsky as a demonic figure with a pentagram, alongside stereotyped Chinese Bolshevik supporters portrayed as executioners. The caption reads, "Peace and Liberty in Sovdepiya" (a derogatory term for Soviet Russia).

The military situation tested Trotsky's organisational skills. In May–June 1918, the Czechoslovak Legions revolted, leading to the loss of most of Russia's territory, increasingly organised resistance from anti-Communist forces (the White Army), and widespread defections by military experts Trotsky relied on.

Trotsky and the government responded with a full mobilisation, increasing the Red Army from under 300,000 in May 1918 to one million by October, and introducing political commissars to ensure loyalty of military experts (mostly former Imperial officers) and co-sign their orders. Trotsky viewed the Red Army's organisation as built on October Revolution ideals. He later wrote:

An army cannot be built without reprisals. Masses of men cannot be led to death unless the army command has the death-penalty in its arsenal. So long as those malicious tailless apes that are so proud of their technical achievements—the animals that we call men—will build armies and wage wars, the command will always be obliged to place the soldiers between the possible death in the front and the inevitable one in the rear. And yet armies are not built on fear. The Tsar's army fell to pieces not because of any lack of reprisals. In his attempt to save it by restoring the death-penalty, Kerensky only finished it. Upon the ashes of the great war, the Bolsheviks created a new army. These facts demand no explanation for any one who has even the slightest knowledge of the language of history. The strongest cement in the new army was the ideas of the October revolution, and the train supplied the front with this cement.

A controversial measure was hostage-taking of relatives of ex-Tsarist officials in the Red Army to prevent defection or betrayal. Service noted this practice was used by both Red and White armies. Trotsky later defended this, arguing no families of betraying ex-officials were executed and that such measures, if adopted earlier, would have reduced overall casualties. Deutscher highlights Trotsky's preference for exchanging hostages over execution, recounting General Pyotr Krasnov's release on parole in 1918, only for Krasnov to take up arms again shortly thereafter.

===== Red Terror =====
European theatre of the Russian Civil War in 1918–1919

The Red Terror was enacted following assassination attempts on Lenin and Trotsky, and the assassinations of Petrograd Cheka leader Moisei Uritsky and the party editor V. Volodarsky. The French Reign of Terror is seen as an influence. The decision was also driven by early White Army massacres of "Red" prisoners in 1917, Allied intervention, and massacres of Reds during the Finnish Civil War (10,000–20,000 workers killed by Finnish Whites). In Terrorism and Communism, Trotsky argued the terror in Russia began with the White Terror under White Guard forces, to which the Bolsheviks responded with the Red Terror.

Felix Dzerzhinsky, director of the Cheka (predecessor to the KGB), was tasked with rooting out counter-revolutionary threats. From early 1918, Bolsheviks began eliminating opposition, including anarchists. On 11 August 1918 Lenin telegraphed orders "to introduce mass terror" in Nizhny Novgorod and to "crush" landowners resisting grain requisitioning.

On 30 August Fanny Kaplan, a Socialist Revolutionary, unsuccessfully attempted to assassinate Lenin. In September Trotsky rushed from the eastern front to Moscow; Stalin remained in Tsaritsyn. Kaplan cited growing Bolshevik authoritarianism. These events persuaded the government to heed Dzerzhinsky's calls for greater terror. The Red Terror officially began thereafter, between 17 and 30 August 1918. Trotsky wrote:

The bourgeoisie today is a falling class... We are forced to tear it off, to chop it away. The Red Terror is a weapon utilized against a class, doomed to destruction, which does not wish to perish. If the White Terror can only retard the historical rise of the proletariat, the Red Terror hastens the destruction of the bourgeoisie.

===== Desertions =====
Trotsky appealed politically to deserters, arousing them with revolutionary ideas.

In...Kaluga, Voronezh, and Ryazan, tens of thousands of young peasants had failed to answer the first recruiting summons by the Soviets ... The war commissariat of Ryazan succeeded in gathering in some fifteen thousand of such deserters. While passing through Ryazan, I decided to take a look at them... The men were called out of their barracks. "Comrade-deserters—come to the meeting. Comrade Trotsky has come to speak to you." They ran out excited, boisterous, as curious as schoolboys... I spoke to them for about an hour and a half... I tried to raise them in their own eyes; concluding, I asked them to lift their hands in token of their loyalty to the revolution... They were genuinely enthusiastic... Later on, regiments of Ryazan "deserters" fought well at the fronts.

The Red Army first used punitive barrier troops in summer/autumn 1918 on the Eastern Front. Trotsky authorised Mikhail Tukhachevsky, commander of the 1st Army, to station blocking detachments behind unreliable infantry regiments, with orders to shoot if front-line troops deserted or retreated without permission. These troops comprised personnel from Cheka punitive detachments or regular infantry regiments. In December 1918 Trotsky ordered more barrier troops raised for each infantry formation. Barrier troops were also used to enforce Bolshevik control over food supplies, earning civilian hatred.

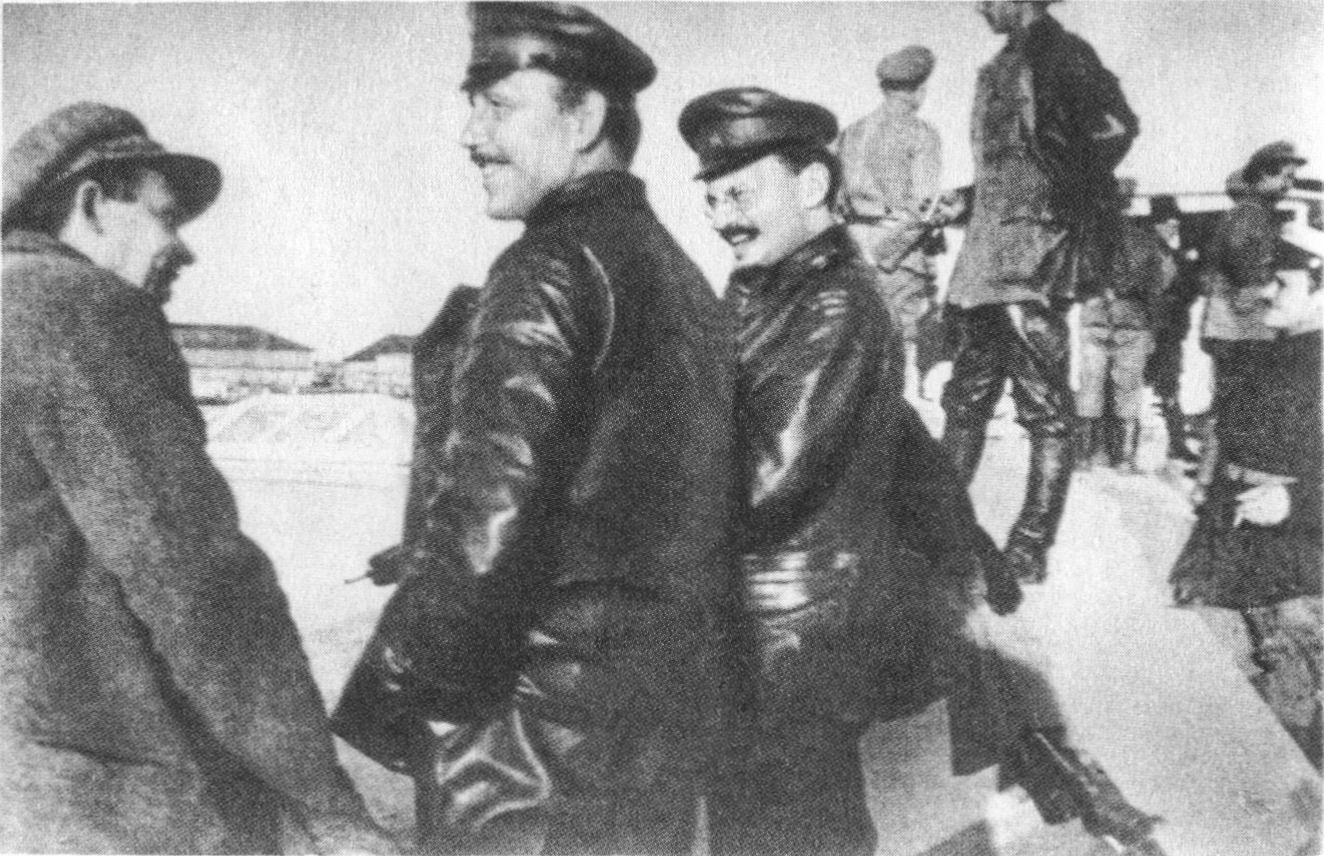
Trotsky with poet Demyan Bedny near Kazan, 1918

Given manpower shortages and 16 opposing foreign armies, Trotsky insisted on using former Tsarist officers as military specialists, combined with Bolshevik political commissars. Lenin commented:

When Comrade Trotsky informed me recently that the number of officers of the old army employed by our War Department runs into several tens of thousands, I perceived concretely where the secret of using our enemy lay, how to compel those who had opposed communism to build it, how to build communism with the bricks which the capitalists had chosen to hurl against us! We have no other bricks! And so, we must compel the bourgeois experts, under the leadership of the proletariat, to build up our edifice with these bricks. This is what is difficult; but this is the pledge of victory.

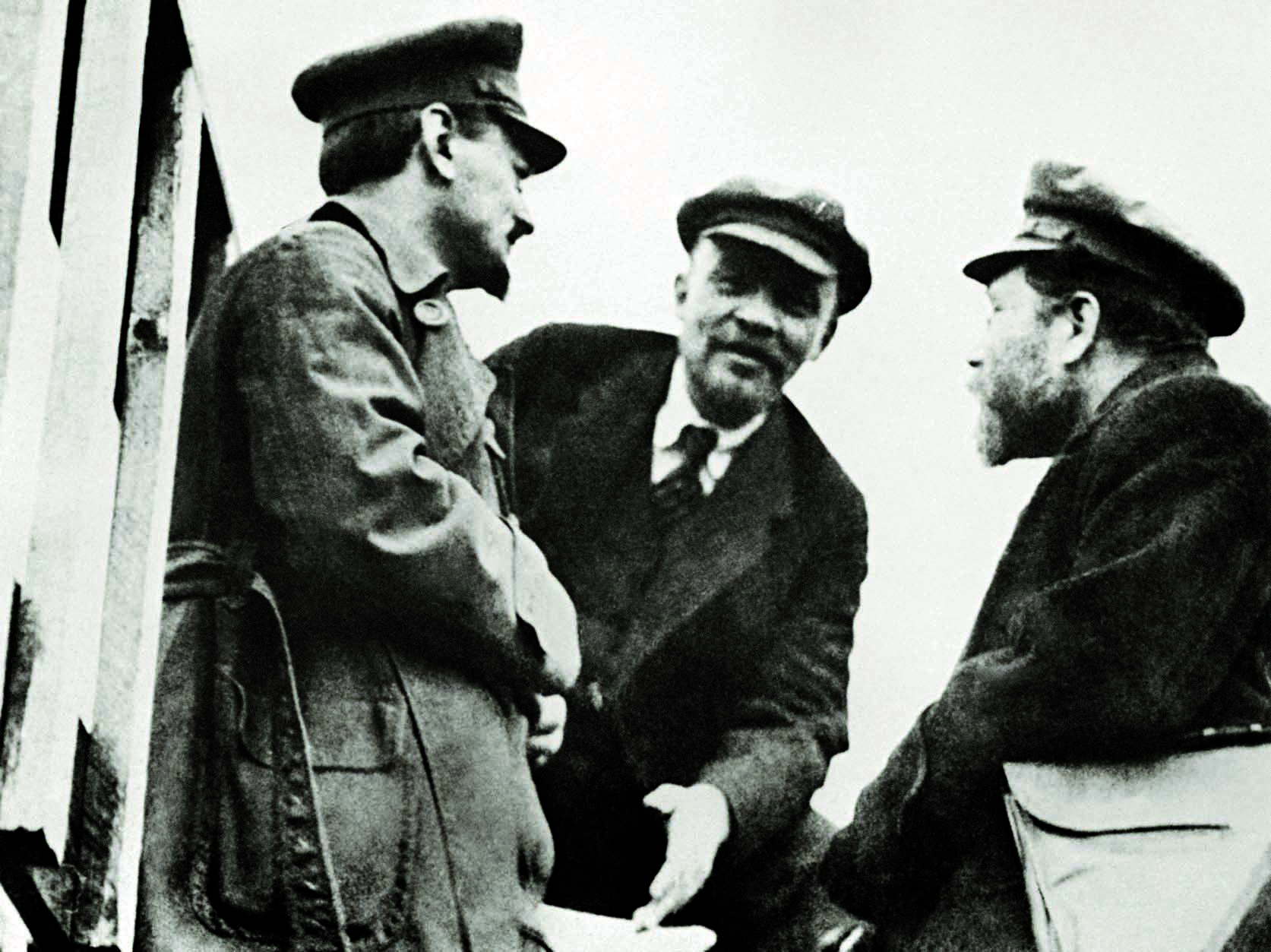
Trotsky (left), with Lenin (centre) and Kamenev (right), in discussion during the Russian Civil War

In September 1918, facing military difficulties, the Bolshevik government declared martial law and reorganised the Red Army. The Supreme Military Council was abolished, and the position of commander-in-chief restored, filled by Jukums Vācietis, commander of the Latvian Riflemen. Vācietis handled day-to-day operations. Trotsky became chairman of the new Revolutionary Military Council of the Republic, retaining overall military control. Despite earlier clashes with Vācietis, Trotsky established a working relationship. This reorganisation caused another conflict between Trotsky and Stalin in late September. Trotsky appointed the former imperial general Pavel Sytin to command the Southern Front, but Stalin refused to accept him in early October, and Sytin was recalled. Lenin and Yakov Sverdlov tried to reconcile Trotsky and Stalin, but their meeting failed.

In 1919, 612 "hardcore" deserters out of 837,000 draft dodgers and deserters were executed under Trotsky's measures. According to Orlando Figes, most "deserters...were handed back to the military authorities, and formed into units for transfer to one of the rear armies or directly to the front". Even "malicious" deserters were returned to the ranks when reinforcements were desperate. Figes noted the Red Army instituted amnesty weeks, prohibiting punitive measures against desertion, which encouraged the voluntary return of 98,000–132,000 deserters.

==== 1919 ====
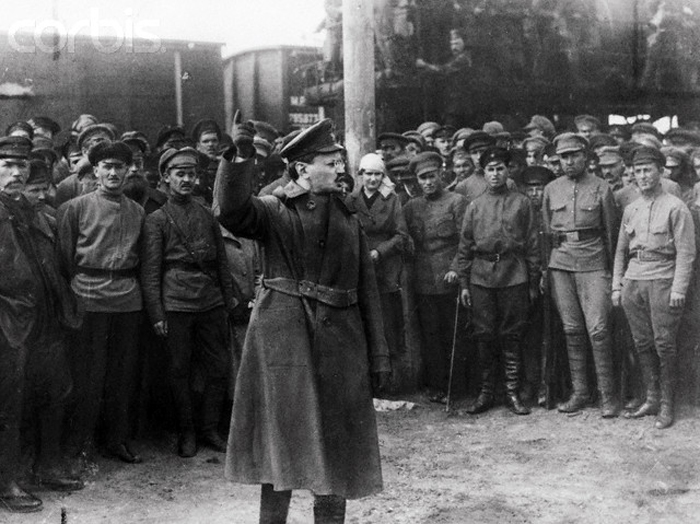
Trotsky addressing soldiers during the Polish–Soviet War

Throughout late 1918 and early 1919, Trotsky's leadership faced attacks, including veiled accusations in Stalin-inspired newspaper articles and a direct attack by the Military Opposition at the VIIIth Party Congress in March 1919. He weathered them, being elected one of five full members of the first Politburo after the Congress. But he later wrote:

It is no wonder that my military work created so many enemies for me. I did not look to the side, I elbowed away those who interfered with military success, or in the haste of the work trod on the toes of the unheeding and was too busy even to apologize. Some people remember such things. The dissatisfied and those whose feelings had been hurt found their way to Stalin or Zinoviev, for these two also nourished hurts.

In mid-1919 the Red Army had grown from 800,000 to 3,000,000 and fought on sixteen fronts, providing an opportunity for challenges to Trotsky's leadership. At the 3–4 July Central Committee meeting, after a heated exchange, the majority supported Kamenev and Smilga against Vācietis and Trotsky. Trotsky's plan was rejected, and he was criticised for alleged leadership shortcomings, many personal. Stalin used this to pressure Lenin to dismiss Trotsky.

Significant changes were made to Red Army leadership. Trotsky was temporarily sent to the Southern Front, while Smilga informally coordinated work in Moscow. Most non-day-to-day Revolutionary Military Council members were relieved of duties on 8 July, and new members, including Smilga, were added. The same day, Vācietis was arrested by the Cheka on suspicion of an anti-Soviet plot and replaced by Sergey Kamenev. After weeks in the south, Trotsky returned to Moscow and resumed control. A year later, Smilga and Tukhachevsky were defeated at the Battle of Warsaw, but Trotsky's refusal to retaliate against Smilga earned his friendship and later support during 1920s intra-Party battles.

By October 1919 the government faced its worst crisis: Denikin's troops approached Tula and Moscow from the south, and General Nikolay Yudenich's troops approached Petrograd from the west. Lenin decided Petrograd had to be abandoned to defend Moscow. Trotsky argued Petrograd needed to be defended, partly to prevent Estonia and Finland from intervening. In a rare reversal, Trotsky, supported by Stalin and Zinoviev, prevailed against Lenin in the Central Committee.

==== 1920 ====
With Denikin and Yudenich defeated in late 1919, government emphasis shifted to the economy. Trotsky spent winter 1919–1920 in the Urals region restarting its economy. A false rumour of his assassination circulated internationally on New Year's Day 1920. Based on his experiences, he proposed abandoning War Communism policies, including grain confiscation, and partially restoring the grain market. Lenin, still committed to War Communism, rejected his proposal.

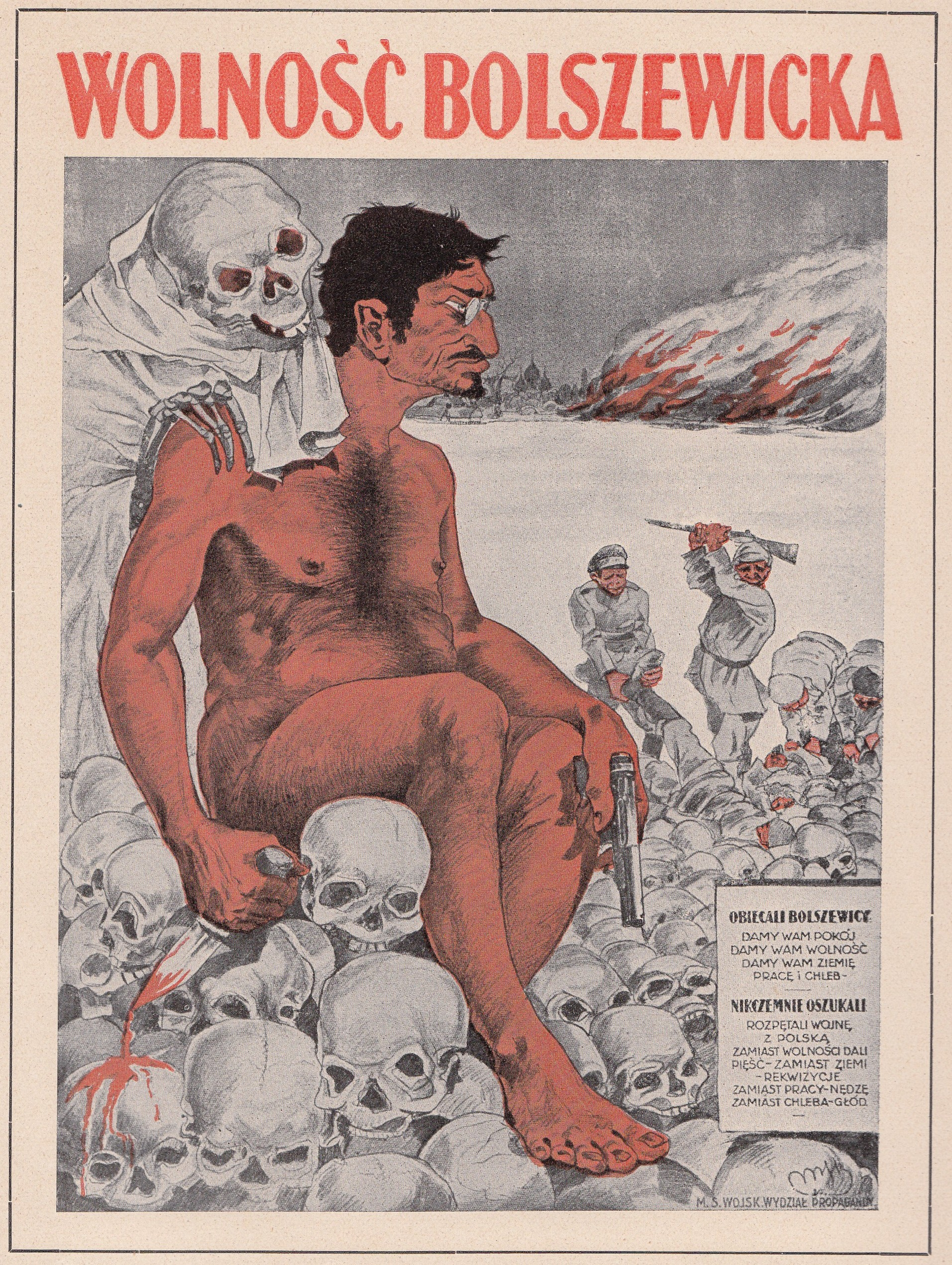
Trotsky on an anti-Soviet Polish poster titled Bolshevik freedom, depicting him atop a pile of skulls, holding a bloody knife, during the Polish–Soviet War

In early 1920, Soviet–Polish tensions led to the Polish–Soviet War. Trotsky argued the Red Army was exhausted and the government should sign a peace treaty with Poland quickly, not believing the Red Army would find much support in Poland. Lenin and other Bolshevik leaders believed Red Army successes meant "The defensive period of the war with worldwide imperialism was over, and we could, and had the obligation to, exploit the military situation to launch an offensive war." Poland defeated the Red Army, turning back the offensive at the Battle of Warsaw in August 1920. Back in Moscow, Trotsky again argued for peace, and this time prevailed.

=== Trade union debate (1920–1921) ===
During the 1920–1921 trade union debate, Trotsky argued that trade unions should be integrated directly into the state apparatus, advocating for a "militarization of labour" to rebuild the Soviet economy. He believed that in a workers' state, the state should control unions, with workers treated as "soldiers of labour" under strict discipline.

This position was sharply criticised by Lenin, who argued unions should retain some independence and act as "schools of communism" rather than state instruments. Lenin's view prevailed at the 10th Congress in 1921. Several of Trotsky's supporters, including Nikolay Krestinsky, lost leadership positions.

=== Kronstadt rebellion ===
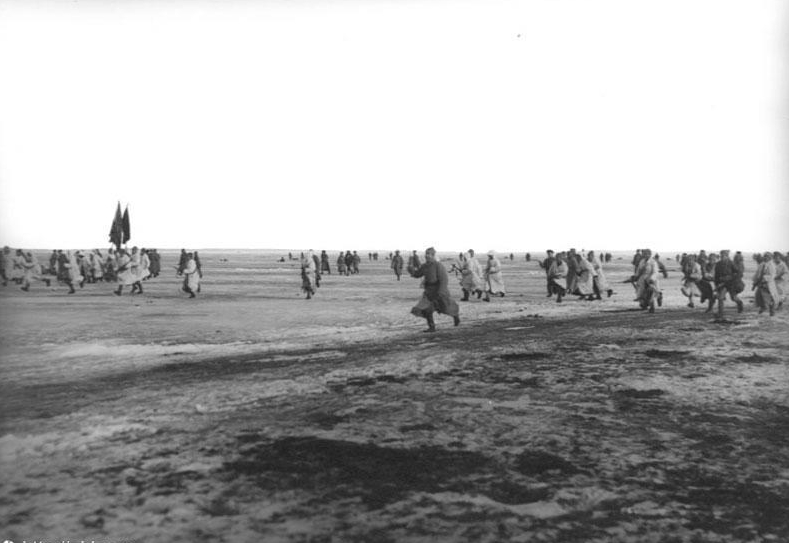
Red Army troops attack Kronstadt sailors in March 1921.

In March 1921, during the Kronstadt Rebellion, sailors and soldiers at the Kronstadt naval base revolted against the Bolshevik government, demanding greater freedom for workers and peasants, an end to one-party rule, and restoration of civil rights. The rebellion, occurring simultaneously with the 10th Party Congress, further destabilised the fragile political situation.

Trotsky, as Commissar of War, was instrumental in ordering the rebellion's suppression. On 18 March 1921, after failed negotiations, the Red Army stormed the island, resulting in thousands of Kronstadt sailors' deaths. Trotsky justified the action by presenting evidence of foreign backing, a claim contested by several historians. His role has been criticised, with anarchists like Emma Goldman accusing him of betraying the revolution's democratic ideals.

=== Contribution to the Russian Revolution ===
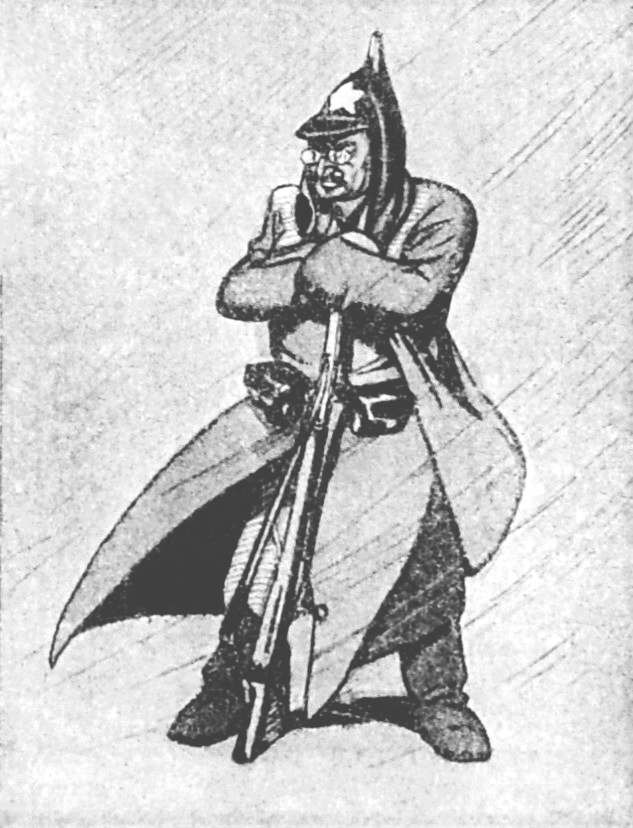
Trotsky, the People's Commissar for Military and Naval Affairs, as the Guard of the October Revolution, 14 May 1923

The historian Vladimir Cherniaev sums up Trotsky's main contributions:

Trotsky bears a great deal of responsibility both for the victory of the Red Army in the civil war, and for the establishment of a one-party authoritarian state with its apparatus for ruthlessly suppressing dissent ... He was an ideologist and practitioner of the Red Terror. He despised "bourgeois democracy"; he believed that spinelessness and soft-heartedness would destroy the revolution, and that the suppression of the propertied classes and political opponents would clear the historical arena for socialism. He was the initiator of concentration camps, compulsory "labour camps", and the militarization of labour, and the state takeover of trade unions. Trotsky was implicated in many practices which would become standard in the Stalin era, including summary executions.

The historian Geoffrey Swain argues:

The Bolsheviks triumphed in the Civil War because of Trotsky's ability to work with military specialists, because of the style of work he introduced where widescale consultation was followed through by swift and determined action.

Lenin said in 1921 that Trotsky was "in love with organisation", but in working politics, "he has not got a clue". Swain explains this by arguing Trotsky was not good at teamwork, being a loner who had mostly worked as a journalist, not a professional revolutionary like others.

=== Lenin's illness (1922–1923) ===
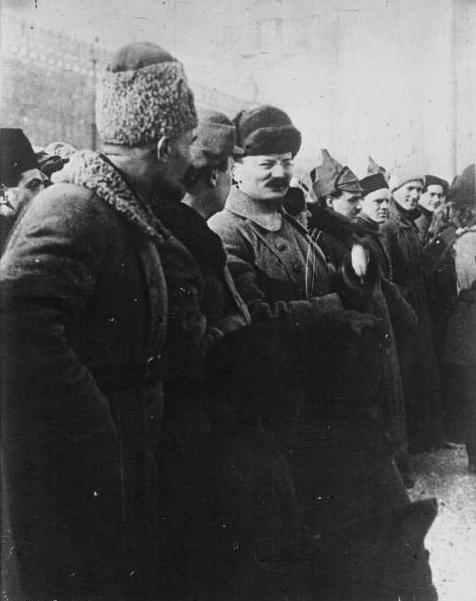
Trotsky with Red Army soldiers in Moscow, 1922

In late 1921 Lenin's health deteriorated. He suffered three strokes between 25 May 1922 and 9 March 1923, causing paralysis, loss of speech, and his eventual death on 21 January 1924. With Lenin increasingly sidelined, Stalin was elevated to the new position of Central Committee General Secretary in April 1922. (Note: Yakov Sverdlov was the Central Committee's senior secretary for personnel affairs from 1917 until his death in March 1919. He was replaced by Elena Stasova, then Nikolai Krestinsky in November 1919. After Krestinsky's ouster in March 1921, Vyacheslav Molotov became senior secretary but lacked Krestinsky's authority as he was not a full Politburo member. Stalin took over as senior secretary, formalized at the XIth Party Congress in April 1922, with Molotov as second secretary.) Zinoviev and Lev Kamenev (Note: It is unclear why Kamenev, a mild-mannered man with few leadership ambitions and Trotsky's brother-in-law, sided with Zinoviev and Stalin against Trotsky in 1922. Trotsky later speculated it might have been due to Kamenev's love of comfort, which Trotsky found "repelled me". He expressed his feelings to Kamenev in late 1920 or early 1921: "Our relations with Kamenev, which were very good in the first period after the insurrection, began to become more distant from that day.") formed a triumvirate (troika) with Stalin to prevent Trotsky, publicly number two and Lenin's heir presumptive, from succeeding Lenin.

The rest of the expanded Politburo (Rykov, Mikhail Tomsky, Bukharin) initially remained uncommitted but eventually joined the troika. Stalin's patronage power (Note: The Central Committee's Secretariat became increasingly important during and after the Civil War, as the Party shifted from elected to appointed officials. This was driven by the need for rapid manpower allocation and the party's transformation from a small revolutionary group to the ruling party, with increased membership including career seekers and former members of banned socialist parties, viewed with apprehension by Old Bolsheviks. To prevent party degeneration, membership requirements for officials were instituted, and the Secretariat gained ultimate power over local appointments, concentrating enormous power in the General Secretary's hands.) as General Secretary played a role, but Trotsky and his supporters later concluded a more fundamental reason was the slow bureaucratisation of the Soviet regime after the Civil War. Much of the Bolshevik elite desired "normality", while Trotsky personified a turbulent revolutionary period they wished to leave behind.

Evidence suggests the troika initially nominated Trotsky for minor government departments (e.g., Gokhran, the State Depository for Valuables). In mid-July 1922 Kamenev wrote to the recovering Lenin that "[the Central Committee] is throwing or is ready to throw a good cannon overboard". Lenin, shocked, responded:

Throwing Trotsky overboard—surely you are hinting at that, it is impossible to interpret it otherwise—is the height of stupidity. If you do not consider me already hopelessly foolish, how can you think of that????

Until his final stroke, Lenin tried to prevent a split in the leadership, reflected in Lenin's Testament. On 11 September 1922 Lenin proposed Trotsky should become his deputy at the Council of People's Commissars (Sovnarkom). The Politburo approved, but Trotsky "categorically refused". This proposal is interpreted by some scholars as Lenin designating Trotsky his successor as head of government.

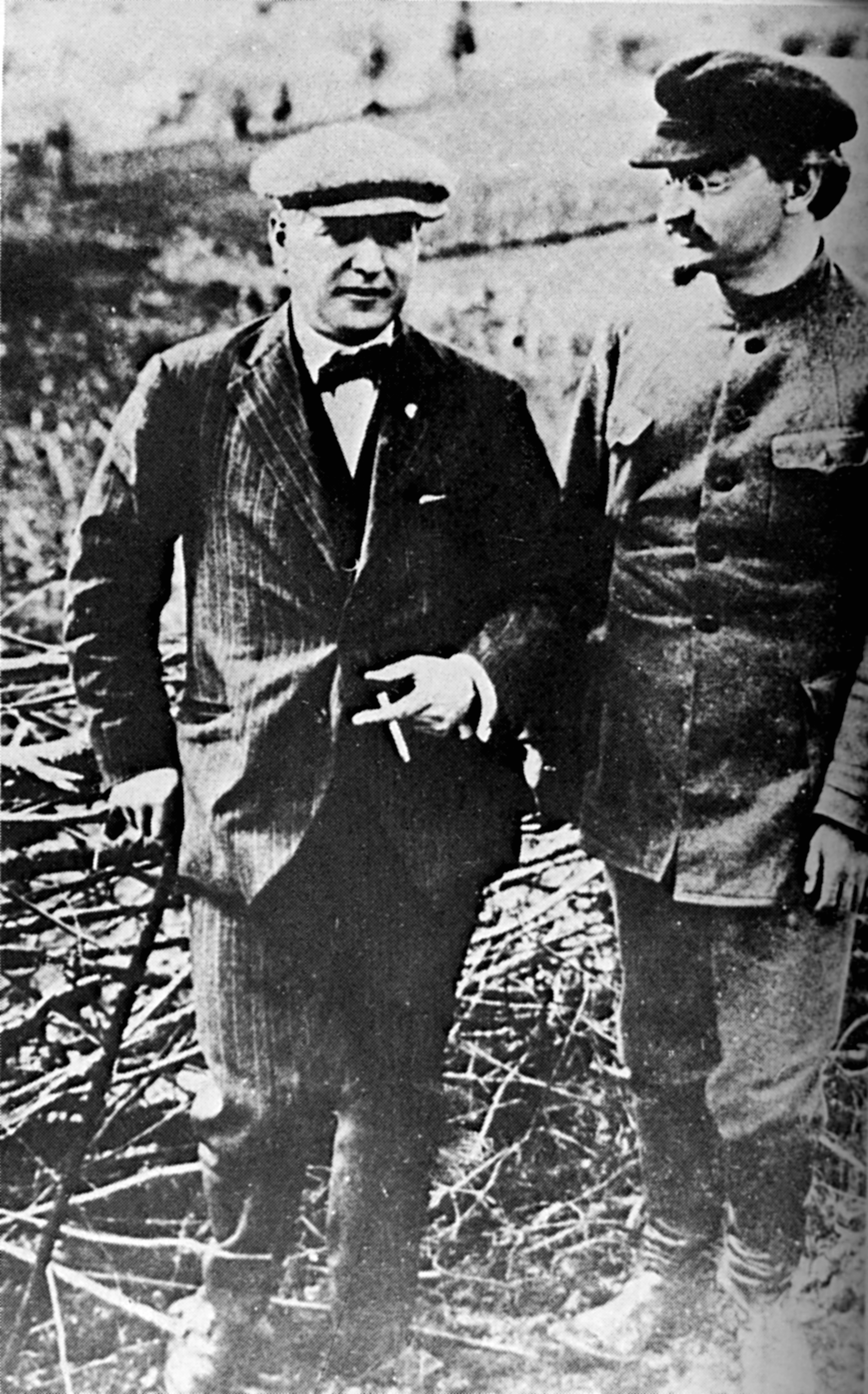
Trotsky with Christian Rakovsky, c. 1924

In late 1922 Trotsky allied with Lenin against Stalin and the emerging Soviet bureaucracy. Stalin had recently engineered the creation of the Union of Soviet Socialist Republics (USSR), further centralising state control. The alliance was effective on foreign trade (Note: Lenin's letter to Stalin, dictated on 15 December 1922: "I am sure Trotsky will uphold my views as well as I." Faced with united opposition from Lenin and Trotsky, the Central Committee reversed its previous decision and adopted the Lenin-Trotsky proposal.) but was hindered by Lenin's progressing illness.

In January 1923 Lenin amended his Testament to suggest Stalin's removal as General Secretary, while also mildly criticizing Trotsky and other Bolsheviks. The Stalin–Lenin relationship had completely broken down, demonstrated when Stalin crudely insulted Lenin's wife, Nadezhda Krupskaya. In March 1923, days before his third stroke, Lenin asked Trotsky to denounce Stalin and his "Great-Russian nationalistic campaign" at the XIIth Party Congress.

At the XIIth Party Congress in April 1923, after Lenin's final stroke, Trotsky did not raise the issue. Instead, he spoke about intra-party democracy, avoiding direct confrontation with the troika. (Note: Trotsky explained in Chapter 12 of his unfinished book Stalin that he refused to deliver the report because "it seemed to me equivalent to announcing my candidacy for the role of Lenin's successor at a time when Lenin was fighting a grave illness".) Stalin had prepared by replacing many local delegates with his loyalists, mostly at the expense of Zinoviev and Kamenev's backers. Delegates, mostly unaware of Politburo divisions, gave Trotsky a standing ovation. This upset the troika, already infuriated by Karl Radek's article "Leon Trotsky – Organiser of Victory", (Note: Radek wrote:"The need of the hour was for a man who would incarnate the call to struggle, a man who, subordinating himself completely to the requirements of the struggle, would become the ringing summons to arms, the will which exacts from all unconditional submission to a great, sacrificial necessity. Only a man with Trotsky's capacity for work, only a man so unsparing of himself as Trotsky, only a man who knew how to speak to the soldiers as Trotsky did—only such a man could have become the standard bearer of the armed toilers. He was all things rolled into one.") published in Pravda on 14 March 1923. Stalin delivered key reports on organisational structure and nationalities; Zinoviev delivered the Central Committee political report, traditionally Lenin's prerogative. Resolutions calling for greater party democracy were adopted but remained vague and unimplemented.

The power struggle also impacted prospects for world revolution. The German Communist Party leadership requested Trotsky be sent to Germany to direct the 1923 insurrection. The Politburo, controlled by Stalin, Zinoviev, and Kamenev, rejected this, sending a commission of lower-ranking Russian Communist party members instead.

=== Left Opposition (1923–1924) ===
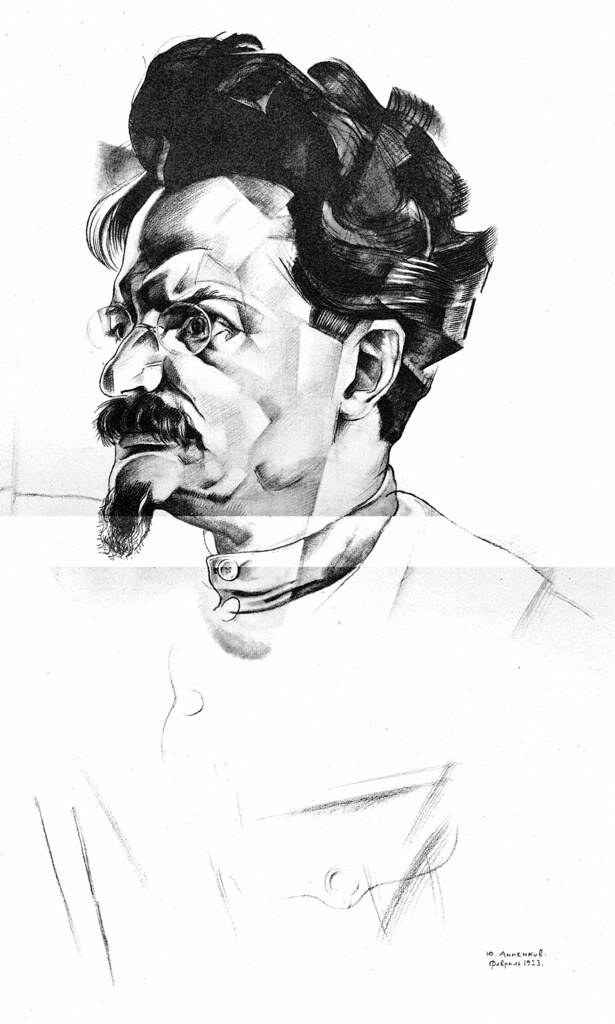
A 1922 cubist portrait by Yury Annenkov. A version appeared on an early cover of Time.

From mid-1923 the Soviet economy faced significant difficulties, leading to widespread strikes. Two secret groups within the Communist Party, "Workers' Truth" and "Workers' Group", were suppressed by the secret police. On 8 October 1923, Trotsky wrote to the Central Committee and Central Control Commission, attributing these problems to a lack of intra-Party democracy:

In the fiercest moment of War Communism, the system of appointment within the party did not have one tenth of the extent that it has now. Appointment of the secretaries of provincial committees is now the rule. That creates for the secretary a position essentially independent of the local organization. [...] The bureaucratization of the party apparatus has developed to unheard-of proportions by means of the method of secretarial selection. [...] There has been created a very broad stratum of party workers, entering into the apparatus of the government of the party, who completely renounce their own party opinion, at least the open expression of it, as though assuming that the secretarial hierarchy is the apparatus which creates party opinion and party decisions. Beneath this stratum, abstaining from their own opinions, there lies the broad mass of the party, before whom every decision stands in the form of a summons or a command.

Other senior communists with similar concerns sent The Declaration of 46 to the Central Committee on 15 October, stating:

[...] we observe an ever progressing, barely disguised division of the party into a secretarial hierarchy and into "laymen", into professional party functionaries, chosen from above, and the other party masses, who take no part in social life. [...] free discussion within the party has virtually disappeared, party public opinion has been stifled. [...] it is the secretarial hierarchy, the party hierarchy which to an ever greater degree chooses the delegates to the conferences and congresses, which to an ever greater degree are becoming the executive conferences of this hierarchy.

Though secret at the time, these letters significantly impacted the Party leadership, prompting a partial retreat by the troika and its supporters, notably in Zinoviev's Pravda article of 7 November. Throughout November, the troika sought a compromise to placate Trotsky and his supporters (made easier by Trotsky's illness in November–December). Trotsky rejected the first draft resolution, leading to a special group (Stalin, Trotsky, Kamenev) to draft a mutually acceptable compromise. On 5 December the Politburo and Central Control Commission unanimously adopted this final draft. On 8 December, Trotsky published an open letter expounding on the resolution's ideas. The troika used this letter to launch a campaign against Trotsky, accusing him of factionalism, setting "the youth against the fundamental generation of old revolutionary Bolsheviks", and other "sins".

Trotsky defended his position in seven letters collected as The New Course in January 1924. The illusion of a "monolithic Bolshevik leadership" shattered, and a lively intra-Party discussion ensued in local organisations and Pravda pages through December and January, until the XIIIth Party Conference (16–18 January 1924). Opponents of the Central Committee's position became known as the Left Opposition. In 1924, at Sverdlov University conferences, Stalin critically cited "the Permanentists" as Trotsky's followers of "Permanent revolution".

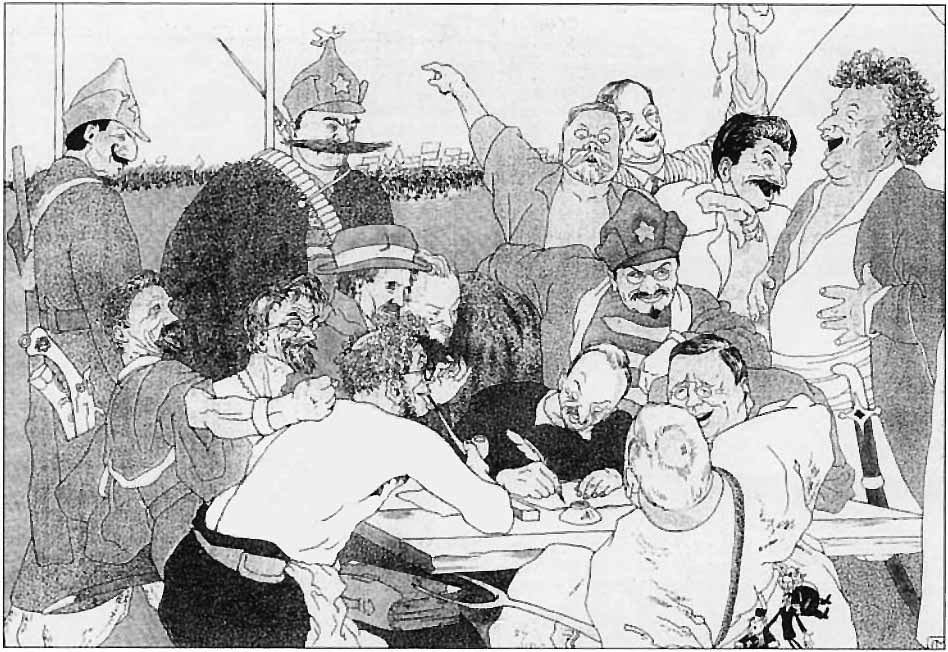
Leon Trotsky (centre right) with Soviet leaders writing a letter of defiance to British Foreign Secretary Lord Curzon in 1923. Painting by an unknown artist, parodying Ilya Repin's Reply of the Zaporozhian Cossacks

Since the troika controlled the Party apparatus via Stalin's Secretariat and Pravda via editor Bukharin, it directed the discussion and delegate selection. Though Trotsky's position prevailed within the Red Army, Moscow universities, and received about half the votes in the Moscow Party organisation, it was defeated elsewhere. The Conference was packed with pro-troika delegates. Only three delegates voted for Trotsky's position, and the Conference denounced "Trotskyism" (Note: The term "Trotskyism" was first coined by Russian liberal politician Pavel Milyukov, the first foreign minister in the Provisional Government, who in April 1917 demanded the British government release Trotsky.) as a "petty bourgeois deviation".

Left Opposition members, representing many international elements, held high-ranking posts, with Christian Rakovsky, Adolph Joffe, and Nikolay Krestinsky serving as ambassadors in London, Paris, Tokyo, and Berlin. Internationally, Trotsky's opposition received support from several Central Committee members of foreign communist parties, including Rakovsky (Chairman of the Ukrainian Sovnarkom), Boris Souvarine of the French Communist Party, and the Central Committee of the Polish Communist Party (led by Maksymilian Horwitz, Maria Koszutska, and Adolf Warski).

=== After Lenin's death (1924) ===
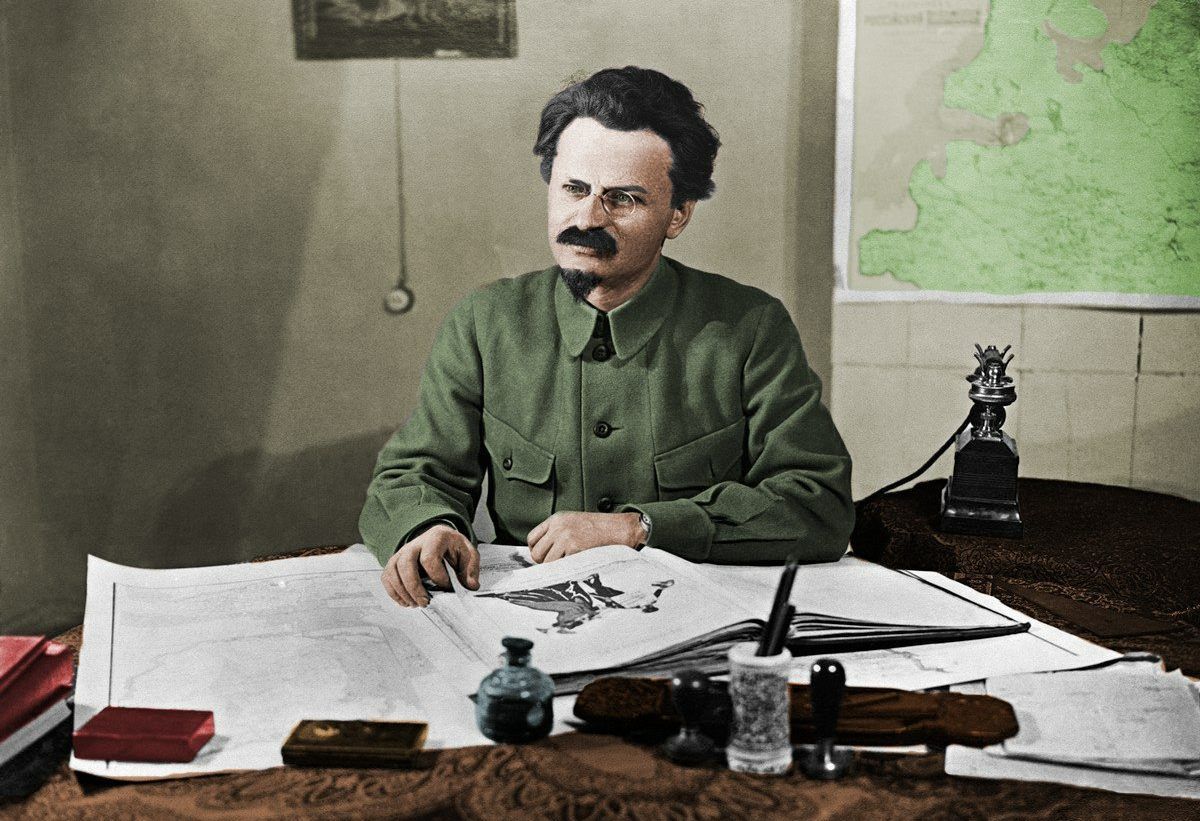
Trotsky in his Moscow office, 1920s

Throughout most of 1924, there was little overt political disagreement within the Soviet leadership. Publicly, Trotsky remained a prominent Bolshevik leader, though his "mistakes" were often alluded to by troika partisans. Behind the scenes, he was cut off from decision-making. Politburo meetings were formalities; key decisions were made beforehand by the troika and its supporters. Trotsky's control over the military was undermined by reassigning his deputy, Ephraim Sklyansky, and appointing Mikhail Frunze, groomed to replace him.

At the XIIIth Party Congress in May, Trotsky delivered a conciliatory speech:

None of us desires or is able to dispute the will of the Party. Clearly, the Party is always right... We can only be right with and by the Party, for history has provided no other way of being in the right. The English have a saying, "My country, right or wrong"... We have much better historical justification in saying whether it is right or wrong in certain individual concrete cases, it is my party... And if the Party adopts a decision which one or other of us thinks unjust, he will say, just or unjust, it is my party, and I shall support the consequences of the decision to the end.

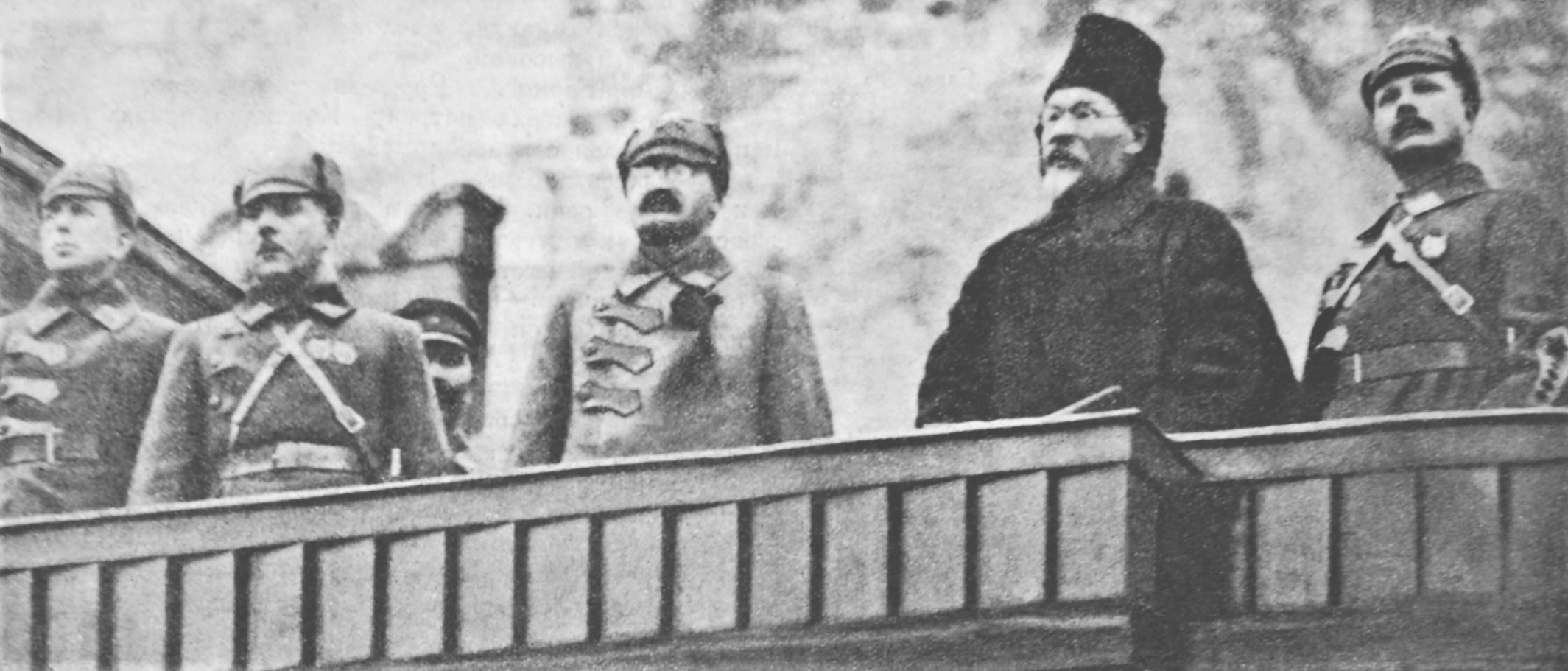
Andrei Bubnov, Kliment Voroshilov, Leon Trotsky, Mikhail Kalinin, and Mikhail Frunze attend the October Revolution parade in Red Square, 7 November 1924

Meanwhile, the Left Opposition, which had formed somewhat unexpectedly in late 1923 and lacked a definite platform beyond general dissatisfaction with the intra-Party "regime", began to crystallise. It lost some less dedicated members due to troika harassment but started formulating a program. Economically, the Left Opposition opposed capitalist elements in the Soviet economy and advocated accelerated industrialisation through state-led policies, putting them at odds with Bukharin and Rykov (the "Right" wing) who supported the troika. On world revolution, Trotsky and Karl Radek saw stability in Europe, while Stalin and Zinoviev predicted an "acceleration" of revolution in Western Europe in 1924. Theoretically, Trotsky remained committed to the idea that the Soviet Union could not create a true socialist society without world revolution, while Stalin gradually developed the policy of "socialism in one country". These ideological divisions formed the basis of the political divide.

At the XIIIth Congress, Kamenev and Zinoviev helped Stalin defuse Lenin's Testament, which had belatedly surfaced. Shortly after, the troika, an alliance of convenience, showed signs of weakness. Stalin began making veiled accusations against Zinoviev and Kamenev. In October 1924, Trotsky published Lessons of October, a summary of the 1917 revolution. He described Zinoviev and Kamenev's opposition to the Bolshevik seizure of power in 1917, something they preferred left unmentioned. This started a new intra-party struggle, the Literary Discussion, with Zinoviev and Kamenev again allied with Stalin against Trotsky. Their criticism of Trotsky focused on:

- Trotsky's pre-1917 disagreements with Lenin and the Bolsheviks.
- Trotsky's alleged distortion of 1917 events to emphasise his role and diminish others'.
- Trotsky's harsh treatment of subordinates and other alleged Civil War mistakes.

Trotsky, ill again, was unable to respond while his opponents mobilised to denounce him. They damaged his military reputation enough to force his resignation as People's Commissar of Army and Fleet Affairs and Chairman of the Revolutionary Military Council on 6 January 1925. Zinoviev demanded Trotsky's expulsion from the Party, but Stalin, playing the moderate, refused. Trotsky kept his Politburo seat but was effectively on probation.

=== A year in the wilderness (1925) ===
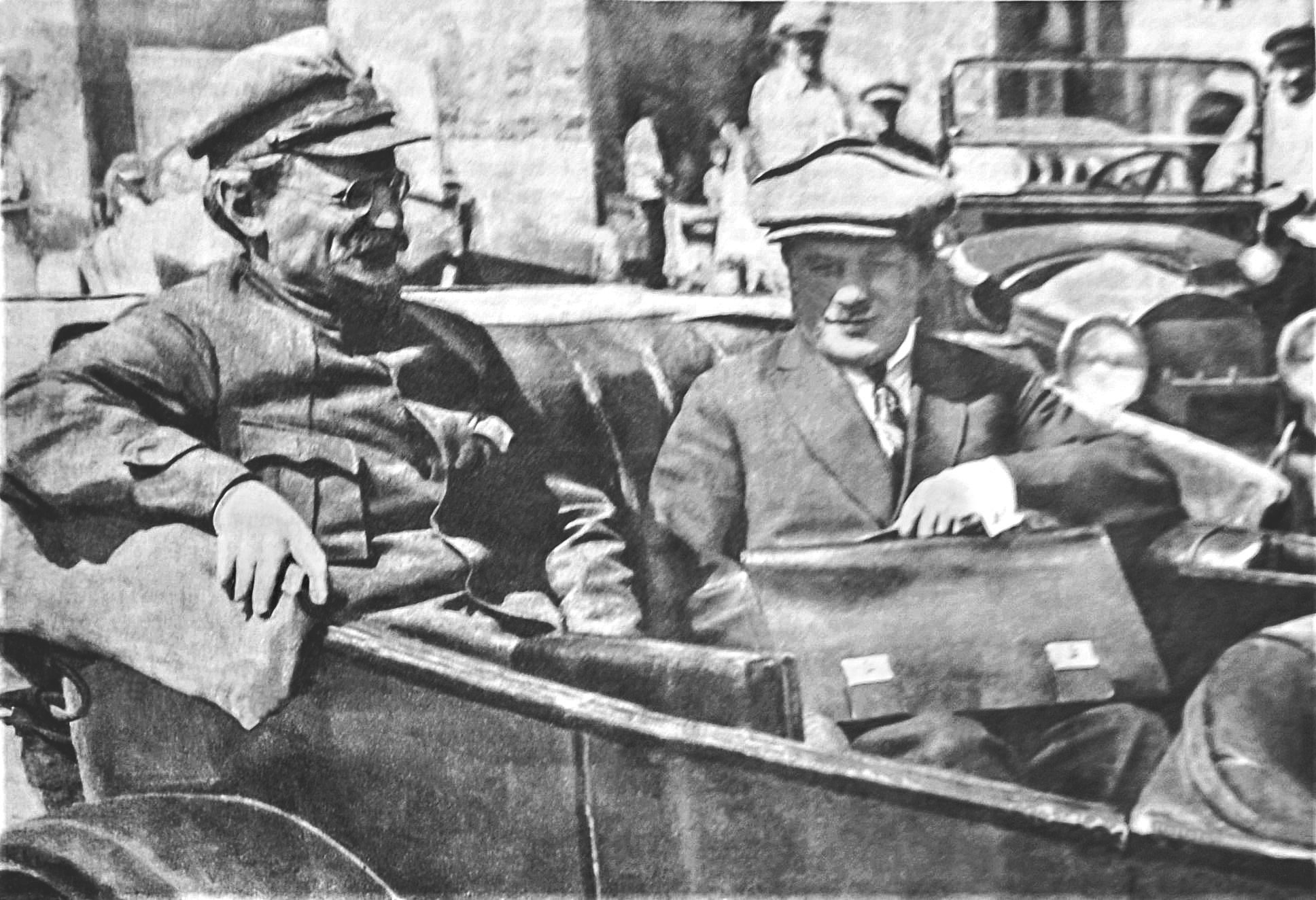
Trotsky and Leonid Serebryakov attend the Congress of Soviets of the Soviet Union in May 1925.

1925 was a difficult year for Trotsky. After the Literary Discussion and losing his Red Army posts, he was effectively unemployed through winter and spring. In May 1925 he received three posts: chairman of the Concessions Committee, head of the electro-technical board, and chairman of the scientific-technical board of industry. Trotsky wrote in My Life that he "was taking a rest from politics" and "naturally plunged into the new line of work up to my ears". He also delivered a tribute to Lenin in his 1925 short book, Lenin.

Some contemporary accounts depict a remote and distracted man. Later in the year, Trotsky resigned his two technical positions, citing Stalin-instigated interference and sabotage, and concentrated on the Concessions Committee.

One of the few political developments affecting Trotsky in 1925 was the American Marxist Max Eastman's book Since Lenin Died (1925), which described the controversy over Lenin's Testament. Trotsky publicly denied Eastman's statements in an article.

Meanwhile, the troika finally broke up. Bukharin and Rykov sided with Stalin, while Krupskaya and Soviet Commissar of Finance Grigory Sokolnikov aligned with Zinoviev and Kamenev. The struggle became open at the September 1925 Central Committee meeting and peaked at the XIVth Party Congress in December 1925. Zinoviev and Kamenev, dubbed The New Opposition, with only the Leningrad Party organisation behind them, were thoroughly defeated. Trotsky refused to get involved and did not speak at the Congress.

=== United Opposition (1926–1927) ===
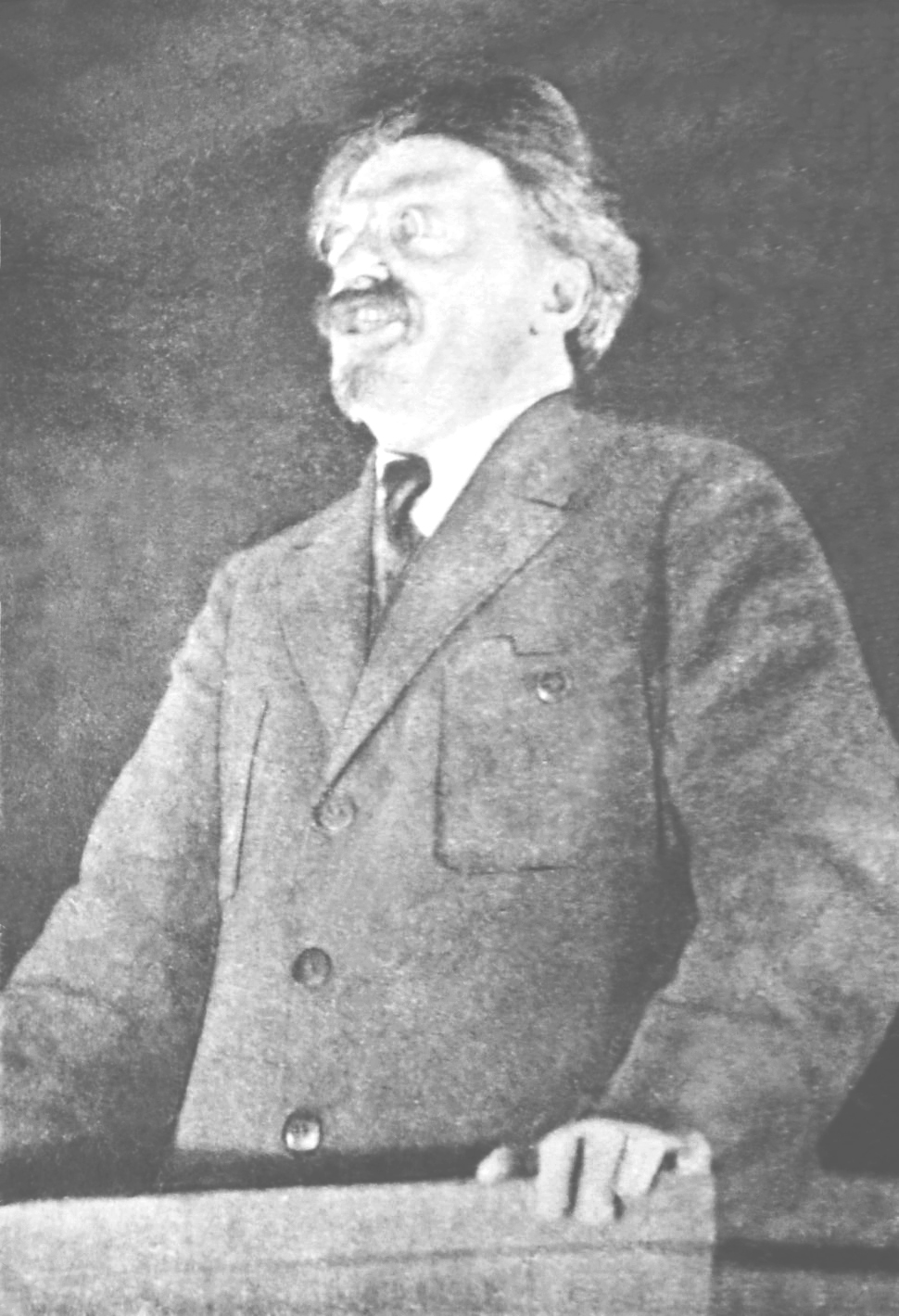
Trotsky addresses a meeting in the House of the Unions, Moscow, March 1926.

In early 1926, Zinoviev, Kamenev, and their "New Opposition" supporters gravitated towards Trotsky's supporters. The two groups soon formed an alliance, incorporating some smaller opposition groups, known as the United Opposition.

The United Opposition faced repeated threats of sanctions from the Stalinist leadership. Trotsky had to agree to tactical retreats, mainly to preserve his alliance with Zinoviev and Kamenev. The opposition remained united against Stalin throughout 1926 and 1927, especially regarding the Shanghai massacre. Stalinist methods against the Opposition became increasingly extreme. At the XVth Party Conference in October 1926, Trotsky could barely speak due to interruptions and catcalls; at its end, he lost his Politburo seat. In 1927, Stalin began using the OGPU (Soviet secret police) to infiltrate and discredit the opposition. Rank-and-file oppositionists were increasingly harassed, sometimes expelled from the Party, and even arrested.

Soviet policy toward the revolution in China became the ideological demarcation line. The 1911 Revolution began on 10 October 1911, leading to Emperor Puyi's abdication on 12 February 1912. Sun Yat-sen established the Republic of China, but it controlled little of the country, much of which was divided among warlords. The Republican government formed the Kuomintang (KMT). In 1920, the KMT opened relations with Soviet Russia. With Soviet help, the KMT built up its army. The planned Northern Expedition to crush northern warlords became a point of contention. Stalin urged the small Chinese Communist Party to merge with the KMT for a bourgeois revolution before attempting a Soviet-style workers' revolution.

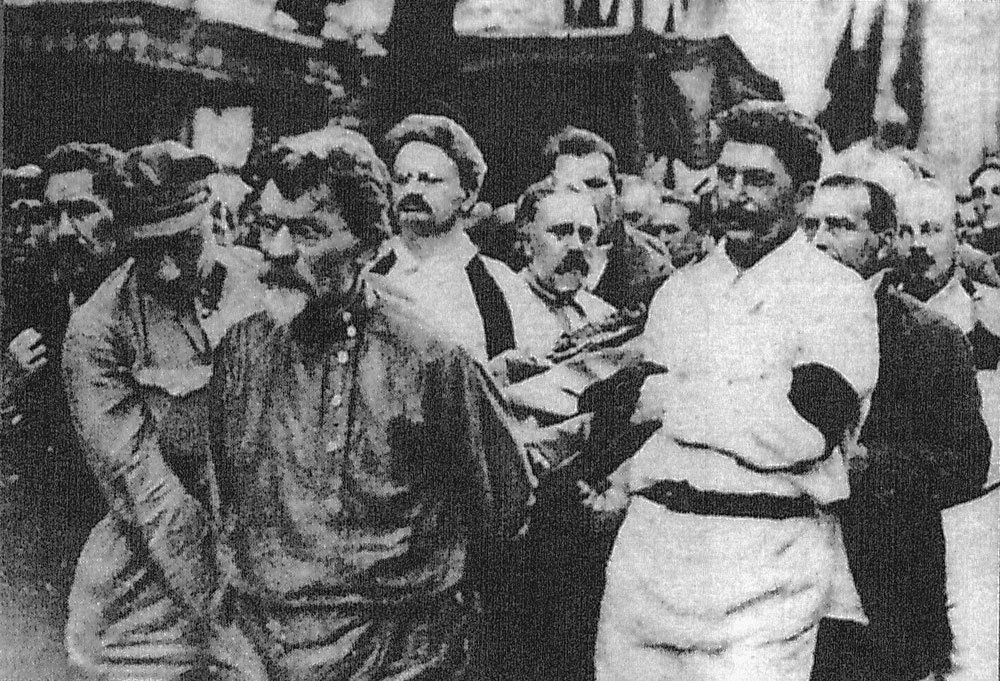
Mikhail Kalinin and Stalin bearing Felix Dzerzhinsky's coffin, 22 July 1926. Trotsky is visible over Kalinin's left shoulder.

Trotsky wanted the Communist Party to complete an orthodox proletarian revolution and maintain clear class independence from the KMT. Stalin funded the KMT during the expedition. He countered Trotskyist criticism in a secret speech, saying Chiang Kai-shek's right-wing KMT were the only ones capable of defeating imperialists, that Chiang had funding from rich merchants, and his forces should be used until "squeezed for all usefulness like a lemon before being discarded". However, Chiang reversed the tables in the Shanghai massacre of 12 April 1927, massacring the Communists in Shanghai midway through the Northern Expedition.

=== Defeat and exile (1927–1928) ===
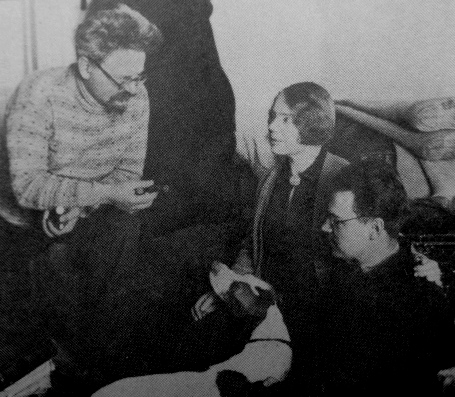
Trotsky with his wife Natalia Sedova and son Lev Sedov in Alma Ata (now Almaty), 1928

On the tenth anniversary of the October Revolution in November 1927, the Opposition held a street demonstration in Moscow against Stalin's government. It was dispersed by Soviet authorities, and Trotsky was expelled from the Communist Party shortly thereafter. Trotsky delivered the eulogy at his friend Adolph Joffe's funeral in November 1927; it was his last public speech in the Soviet Union. When the XVth Party Congress made United Opposition views incompatible with Communist Party membership, Zinoviev, Kamenev, and their supporters capitulated and renounced their alliance with the Left Opposition. Trotsky and most of his followers refused to surrender. Trotsky was exiled to Alma Ata (now Almaty), Kazakhstan, on 31 January 1928. He was expelled from the Soviet Union to Turkey in February 1929, accompanied by his wife Natalia Sedova and their eldest son, Lev.

=== Fate of Left Oppositionists after Trotsky's exile (1929–1941) ===
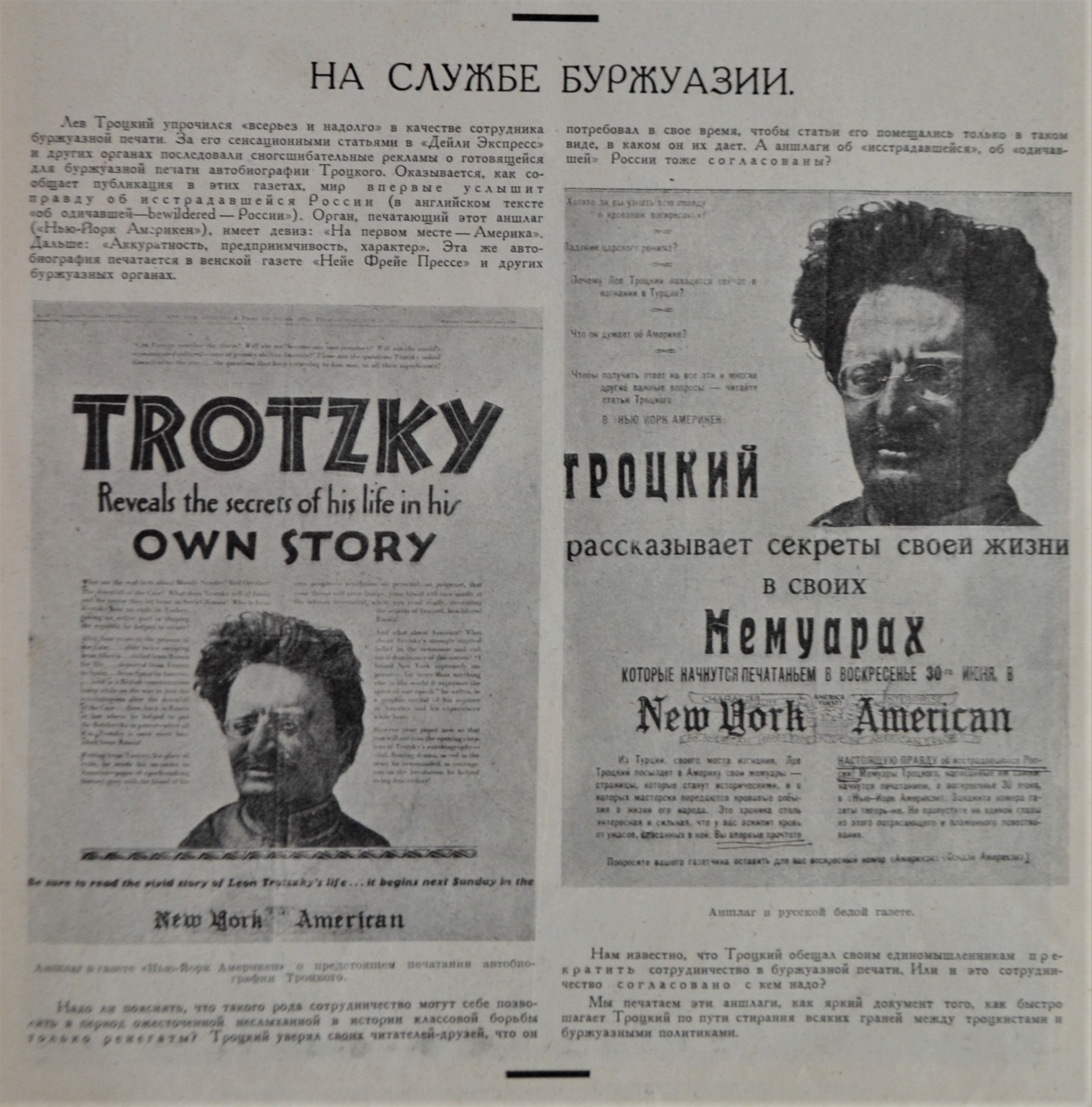
The publication of Trotsky's autobiography My Life as reported in the Soviet Union, August 1929. The editors of Projector magazine titled the item "In the service of bourgeoisie".

After Trotsky's expulsion, Trotskyists within the Soviet Union began to waver. Between 1929 and 1932, most leading Left Opposition members surrendered to Stalin, "admitted their mistakes", and were reinstated in the Communist Party. An initial exception was Christian Rakovsky, who inspired Trotsky from 1929 to 1934 with his refusal to capitulate as state suppression increased. In late 1932, Rakovsky failed to flee the Soviet Union and was exiled to Yakutia in March 1933. At Trotsky's request, the French mathematician and Trotskyist Jean Van Heijenoort, with Pierre Frank, unsuccessfully appealed to the influential Soviet author Maxim Gorky to intervene for Rakovsky, boarding Gorky's ship near Constantinople. According to Heijenoort, they only met Gorky's son, Maxim Peshkov, who promised to pass on their request. Rakovsky was the last prominent Trotskyist to capitulate, in April 1934. His letter to Pravda, titled "There Should Be No Mercy", depicted Trotsky and his supporters as "agents of the German Gestapo". Rakovsky was appointed to high office in the Commissariat for Health and allowed to return to Moscow, also serving as Soviet ambassador to Japan in 1935. However, he was implicated in allegations concerning Sergey Kirov's murder and was arrested and imprisoned in late 1937 during the Great Purge.

Almost all Trotskyists remaining in the Soviet Union were executed in the Great Purges of 1936–1938. Rakovsky survived until the Medvedev Forest massacre of September 1941, where he was shot with 156 other prisoners on Stalin's orders, less than three months into the Axis invasion of the Soviet Union. Trotsky's sister and Kamenev's first wife, Olga Kameneva, was also among the Medvedev Forest victims.

== Exile (1929–1940) ==
=== Turkey ===
Deported from the Soviet Union in February 1929, Trotsky arrived in Turkey. For his first two months, he lived with his wife and eldest son at the Soviet Consulate in Istanbul and then a nearby hotel. In April 1929, Turkish authorities moved them to the island of Büyükada (Prinkipo), into a house called the Yanaros mansion. During his Turkish exile, Trotsky was under surveillance by Mustafa Kemal Pasha's police. He was also at risk from former White Army officers on Prinkipo. However, his European supporters volunteered as bodyguards, ensuring his safety. He requested entry to Belgium, France, Norway, Germany, and the United Kingdom, but all refused.

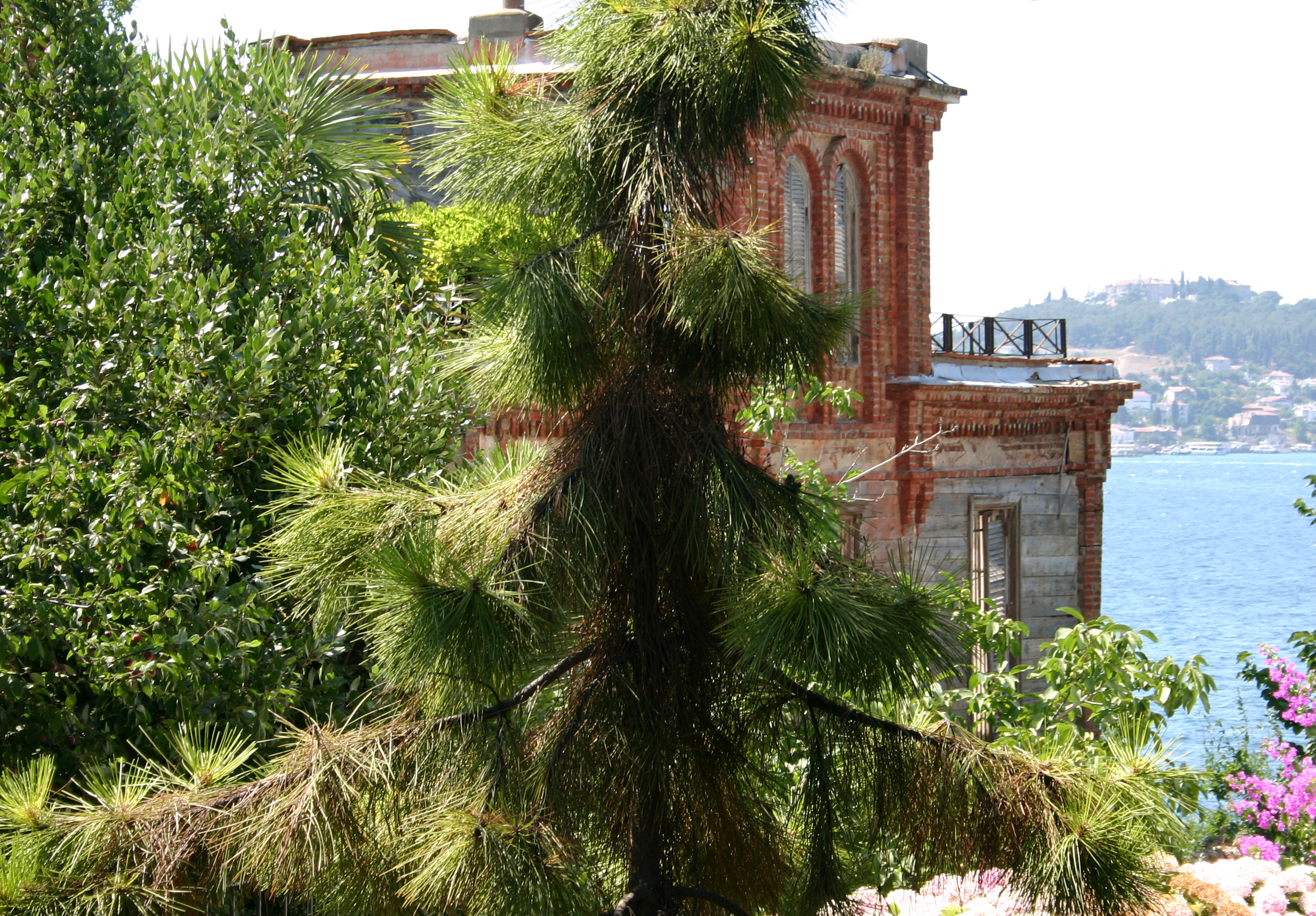
Trotsky's house, the Yanaros mansion on Büyükada, Turkey, pictured in 2006. He lived there from April 1929 to July 1933.

On 20 February 1932 Trotsky and his family lost their Soviet citizenship and were forbidden to enter the Soviet Union. In 1932 he entered fascist Italy en route to a socialist conference in Denmark. By late 1932, Trotsky contacted the anti-Stalin opposition inside the USSR to discuss forming a bloc. There was no evidence of any alliance with Nazi Germany or the Empire of Japan, as the Soviet government claimed. Alleged bloc members included Zinovievites, rightists, and "capitulated" Trotskyists like Kamenev and Zinoviev. Trotsky feared the right gaining too much power within the bloc. The historian Pierre Broué concluded the bloc dissolved in early 1933, as some members like Zinoviev and Kamenev rejoined Stalin, and Trotsky's Harvard archive letters do not mention the bloc after 1932.

=== France ===
In July 1933 Prime Minister Édouard Daladier offered Trotsky asylum; he accepted, but was forbidden to live in Paris and was soon under French police surveillance. From July 1933 to February 1934 Trotsky and his wife lived in Royan. The philosopher and activist Simone Weil arranged for them and their bodyguards to stay briefly at her parents' house. Following the 6 February 1934 crisis, French Minister of Internal Affairs Albert Sarraut signed a decree to deport Trotsky. However, no foreign government would accept him. French authorities then instructed Trotsky to move to a residence in the village of Barbizon under strict police surveillance, where his contact with the outside world became even more restricted than in Turkey. In May 1935, soon after France agreed to the Franco-Soviet Treaty of Mutual Assistance, Trotsky was officially told he was no longer welcome. He applied to move to Norway.

=== Norway ===
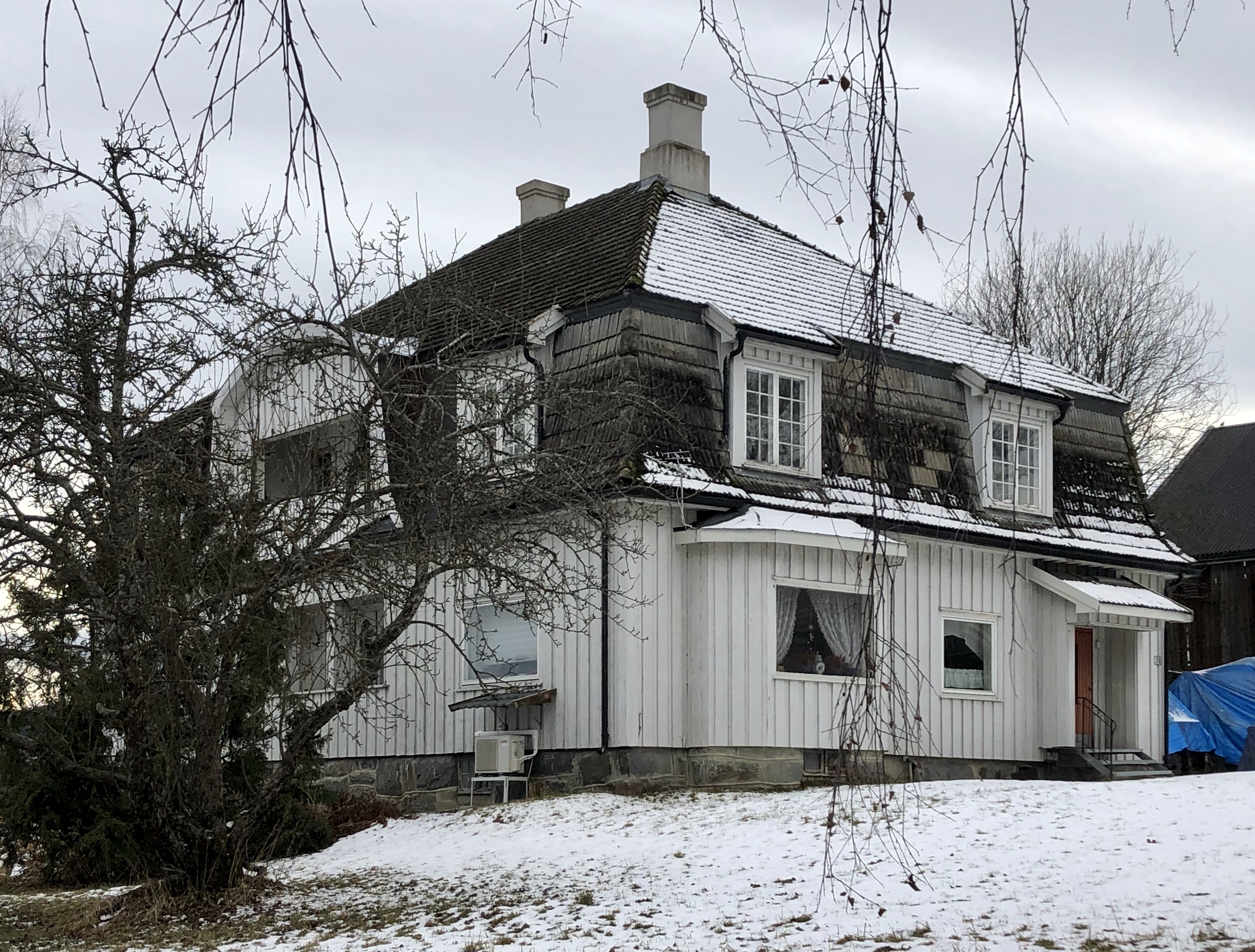
Konrad Knudsen's House in Veksal, Norderhov, Norway, where Trotsky lived from 18 June 1935 to 2 September 1936

After Justice Minister Trygve Lie granted permission, Trotsky and his wife became guests of Konrad Knudsen at Norderhov, near Hønefoss, living at Knudsen's house from 18 June 1935 to 2 September 1936. Trotsky was hospitalised for a few weeks at Oslo Community Hospital from 19 September 1935.

Following French media complaints about Trotsky's role in encouraging the May–June 1936 mass strikes in France with his articles, the Norwegian government, led by Johan Nygaardsvold, grew uneasy. In summer 1936, Trotsky's asylum became a political issue for the fascist Nasjonal Samling, led by Vidkun Quisling, alongside increased Soviet pressure. On 5 August 1936 Nasjonal Samling fascists burgled Knudsen's house while Trotsky and his wife were out. The burglars targeted Trotsky's works and archives. The raid was largely thwarted by Knudsen's daughter, Hjørdis, though some papers were taken. "Evidence" from the burglary was used by the government against Trotsky.

On 14 August 1936 the Soviet TASS agency announced a "Trotskyist–Zinovievist" plot and the imminent start of the Moscow Trials. Trotsky demanded a full, open inquiry. The accused, including Grigory Zinoviev and Lev Kamenev, were sentenced to death and executed on 25 August 1936. On 26 August eight policemen arrived at Knudsen's house, demanding Trotsky sign new residency conditions: no writing on current politics, no interviews, and all correspondence inspected. Trotsky refused and was told he and his wife would be moved. The next day, police interrogated him about his political activities, officially citing him as a "witness" to the 5 August fascist raid.

On 2 September 1936 Trygve Lie ordered Trotsky and his wife transferred to a farm in Hurum, where they were under house arrest. Treatment at Hurum was harsh: confined indoors 22 hours daily under constant guard, with only one hour twice daily for walks. Trotsky was prevented from posting letters or responding to critics. Only his lawyers and Norwegian Labour Party Parliamentary leader Olav Scheflo were allowed visits. From October 1936, even outdoor walks were prohibited. Trotsky smuggled out one letter on 18 December 1936, The Moscow "Confessions". On 19 December 1936 they were deported on the Norwegian oil tanker Ruth, guarded by Jonas Lie. Later, in Mexico, Trotsky scathingly criticised his treatment, accusing the Norwegian government of trying to silence his opposition to the Moscow Trials:

When I look back today on this period of internment, I must say that never, anywhere, in the course of my entire life—and I have lived through many things—was I persecuted with as much miserable cynicism as I was by the Norwegian "Socialist" government. For four months, these ministers, dripping with democratic hypocrisy, gripped me in a stranglehold to prevent me from protesting the greatest crime history may ever know.

=== Mexico ===
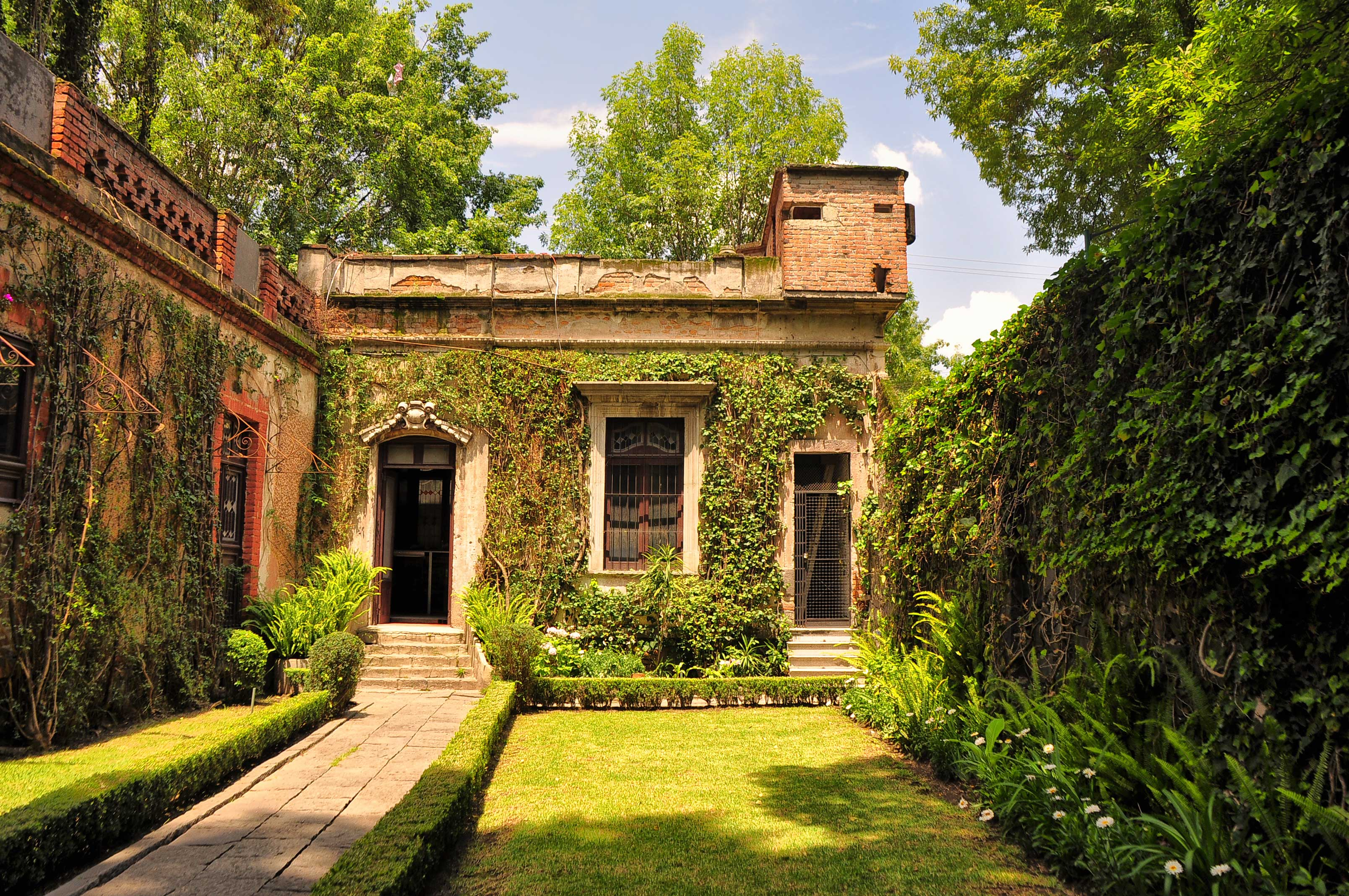
Trotsky's house in Coyoacán, Mexico City, from April 1939 until his assassination in August 1940

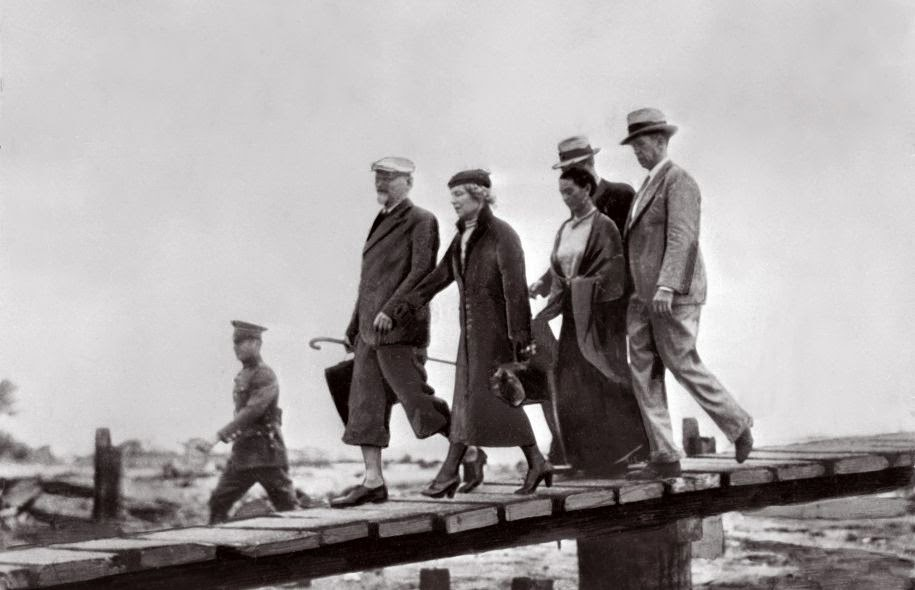
Trotsky (centre, with glasses and goatee) arrives in Mexico, January 1937, with his wife Natalia Sedova (to his left). The artist Frida Kahlo is behind them (to Sedova's left).

Video of Trotsky speaking in Mexico, thanking the country and President Lázaro Cárdenas for asylum, and denouncing Stalin's trials as based on false evidence. (c. 1937–1939)

The Ruth arrived in Mexico on 9 January 1937. President Lázaro Cárdenas welcomed Trotsky and arranged a special train, The Hidalgo, to bring him to Mexico City from Tampico.

From January 1937 to April 1939 Trotsky and his wife lived in Coyoacán at The Blue House, home of the painter Frida Kahlo (with whom Trotsky had an affair) and her husband, Diego Rivera, also a painter. Kahlo later presented him with Self-Portrait Dedicated to Leon Trotsky on his birthday, the 20th anniversary of the October Revolution. His final move, after a break with Rivera, was to a residence on Avenida Viena in April 1939.

In Mexico, Trotsky worked closely with James P. Cannon, Joseph Hansen, and Farrell Dobbs of the Socialist Workers Party of the United States, and other supporters. Cannon, a long-time leader in the American communist movement, had supported Trotsky since reading his criticisms of the Soviet Union in 1928. Trotsky's critique of Stalinism, though banned, was distributed to Comintern leaders. Chen Duxiu, founder of the Chinese Communist Party, was another supporter.

Trotsky collaborated with André Breton and Diego Rivera on the Manifesto for an Independent Revolutionary Art (1938), emphasising artistic freedom outside capitalist and Stalinist constraints. This inspired the International Federation of Independent Revolutionary Art (FIARI) in 1938, though it was short-lived, ending before 1940.

=== Moscow show trials ===
In August 1936 the first Moscow show trial of the "Trotskyite–Zinovievite Terrorist Center" was staged. Zinoviev, Kamenev, and 14 other prominent Old Bolsheviks confessed to plotting with Trotsky to kill Stalin and other Soviet leaders. The court found all defendants guilty, sentencing them, including Trotsky in absentia, to death. The second show trial (Karl Radek, Grigori Sokolnikov, Yuri Pyatakov, and 14 others) in January 1937 linked more alleged conspiracies and crimes to Trotsky. These trials were widely seen as fabrications. In response, an independent Commission of Inquiry, chaired by the American philosopher John Dewey, was established. After investigating the allegations, the Dewey Commission found Trotsky not guilty of the charges made against him in the Moscow Trials. Its findings were published in the book Not Guilty.

The Moscow trials are perpetuated under the banner of socialism. We will not concede this banner to the masters of falsehood! If our generation happens to be too weak to establish Socialism over the earth, we will hand the spotless banner down to our children. The struggle which is in the offing transcends by far the importance of individuals, factions and parties. It is the struggle for the future of all mankind. It will be severe, it will be lengthy. Whoever seeks physical comfort and spiritual calm let him step aside. In time of reaction it is more convenient to lean on the bureaucracy than on the truth. But all those for whom the word 'Socialism' is not a hollow sound but the content of their moral life—forward! Neither threats nor persecutions nor violations can stop us! Be it even over our bleaching bones the future will triumph! We will blaze the trail for it. It will conquer! Under all the severe blows of fate, I shall be happy as in the best days of my youth; because, my friends, the highest human happiness is not the exploitation of the present but the preparation of the future.

— Leon Trotsky, 'I Stake My Life', opening address to the Dewey Commission, 9 February 1937

=== Fourth International ===
Initially, Trotsky opposed establishing parallel communist parties or a parallel international organisation to compete with the Third International (Comintern), fearing it would split the communist movement. He changed his mind in mid-1933 after the Nazi takeover in Germany and the Comintern's response. He stated:

An organization which was not roused by the thunder of fascism and which submits docilely to such outrageous acts of the bureaucracy demonstrates thereby that it is dead and that nothing can ever revive it... In all our subsequent work it is necessary to take as our point of departure the historical collapse of the official Communist International.

In 1938 Trotsky and his supporters founded the Fourth International, intended as a revolutionary and internationalist alternative to the Stalinist Comintern.

=== Writings in exile ===
Soon after arriving in Turkey, Trotsky established the Bulletin of the Opposition, a Russian-language journal first published in July 1929 in Paris. In a 1931 letter titled "What is Fascism", he attempted to define fascism, asserting the Communist International wrongly described Primo de Rivera's dictatorship as "fascist" because it lacked a mass movement base in the lower classes.

Trotsky's seminal writings in exile included the History of the Russian Revolution (1930) and The Revolution Betrayed (1936), a critique of the Soviet Union under Stalinism. He argued the Soviet state had become a "degenerated workers' state" controlled by an undemocratic bureaucracy, which would either be overthrown via a political revolution establishing workers' democracy, or degenerate into a capitalist class.

In May and September 1939, the Socialist Appeal published two articles by Trotsky, "Problem of Ukraine" and "Independence of Ukraine and Sectarian Muddleheads," in which he advocated for the secession of Ukraine from the Soviet Union and the establishment of a new socialist Ukrainian state run by workers and peasants. In the "Problem of Ukraine," Trotsky argued that Stalin used imperialist, bonapartist, and "bureaucratic centralist" measures to strangle the Ukrainian masses, especially during collectivization and the Great Purge. He also states that Stalin's Ukraine strategy laid the groundwork for Hitler's strategy in Ukraine.

In "Independence of Ukraine and Sectarian Muddleheads," Trotsky further advocated for the overthrow of Stalinism in the federation, the inclusion of Ukrainian sovereignty within the world revolution, and the right for Soviet states to secede from the union. Trotsky also argues that the Ukrainian citizens and members of the Ukrainian diaspora were irreconcilably hostile to Soviet governance and eager for separatism. Historian Gerald Meyer argues that Trotsky's calls for Ukrainian independence threatened Stalin, who saw the loss of Ukrainian natural resources as potentially disastrous.

=== The Dies Committee ===
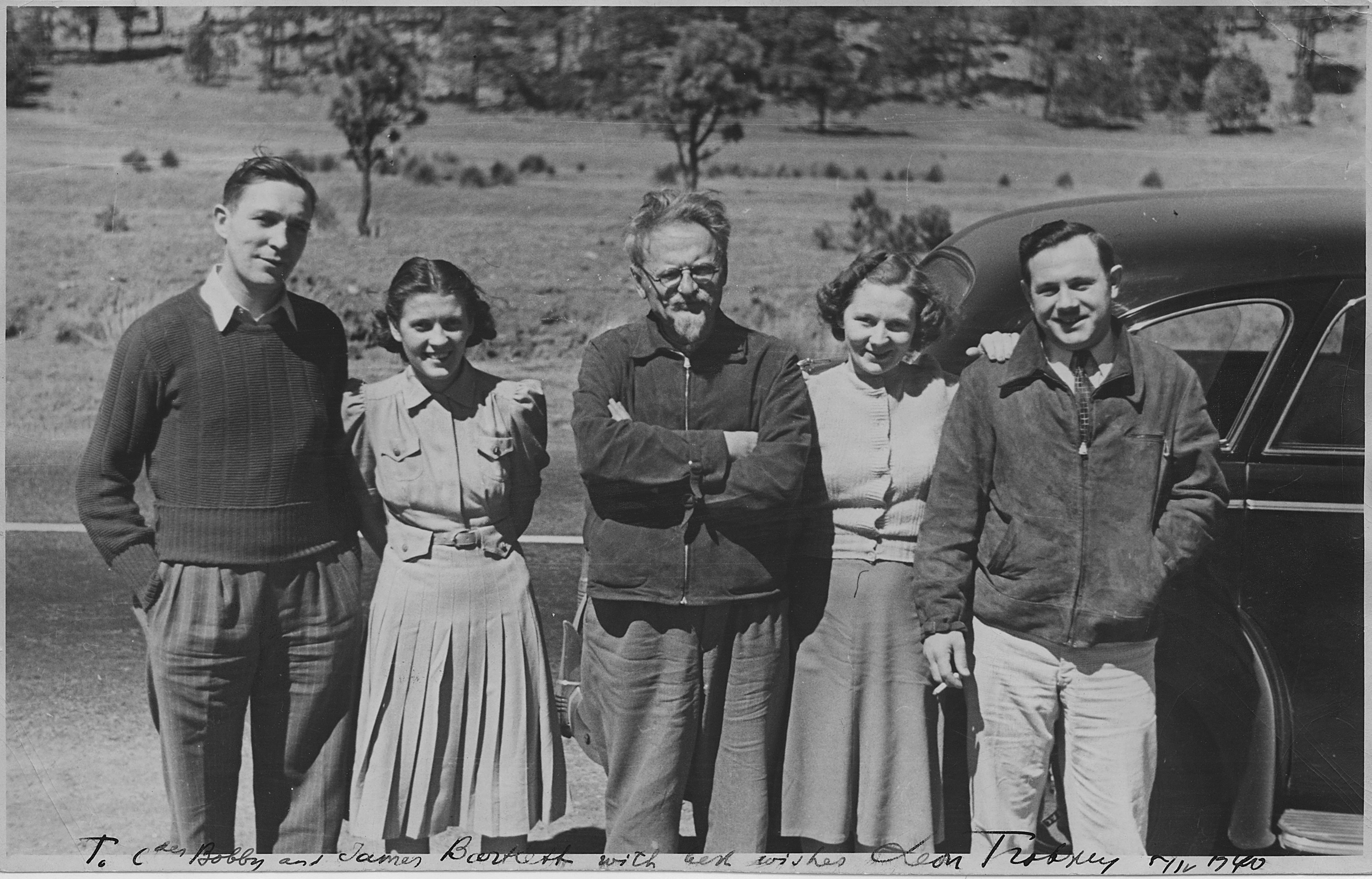
Trotsky (centre) with American comrades, including Harry DeBoer (left), in Mexico, shortly before his assassination, 1940

In late 1939 Trotsky agreed to appear as a witness before the Dies Committee of the United States House of Representatives, a precursor to the House Committee on Un-American Activities. Representative Martin Dies Jr., the committee chairman, sought the suppression of the American Communist Party. Trotsky intended to use the forum to expose NKVD activities against him and his followers. He also planned to argue against suppressing the American Communist Party and to call for transforming World War II into a world revolution. Many supporters opposed his appearance. When the committee learned the nature of Trotsky's intended testimony, it refused to hear him, and he was denied a US visa. The Communist Party of the Soviet Union immediately accused Trotsky of being paid by oil magnates and the Federal Bureau of Investigation (FBI).

=== Final months ===
After quarrelling with Diego Rivera, Trotsky moved to his final residence on Avenida Viena in April 1939. On 27 February 1940 he wrote "Trotsky's Testament", expressing his final thoughts. Suffering from high blood pressure, he feared a cerebral haemorrhage. He reiterated his "unshaken faith in a communist future". Forcefully denying Stalin's accusations of betraying the working class, he thanked his friends and, above all, his wife, Natalia Sedova, for their loyal support:

In addition to the happiness of being a fighter for the cause of socialism, fate gave me the happiness of being her husband. During the almost forty years of our life together she remained an inexhaustible source of love, magnanimity, and tenderness. She underwent great sufferings, especially in the last period of our lives. But I find some comfort in the fact that she also knew days of happiness. For forty-three years of my conscious life I have remained a revolutionist; for forty-two of them I have fought under the banner of Marxism. If I had to begin all over again I would of course try to avoid this or that mistake, but the main course of my life would remain unchanged. I shall die a proletarian revolutionist, a Marxist, a dialectical materialist, and, consequently, an irreconcilable atheist. My faith in the communist future of mankind is not less ardent, indeed it is firmer today, than it was in the days of my youth.
Natasha has just come up to the window from the courtyard and opened it wider so that the air may enter more freely into my room. I can see the bright green strip of grass beneath the wall, and the clear blue sky above the wall, and sunlight everywhere. Life is beautiful. Let the future generations cleanse it of all evil, oppression and violence, and enjoy it to the full.
L. Trotsky
27 February 1940
Coyoacán.

== Assassination ==
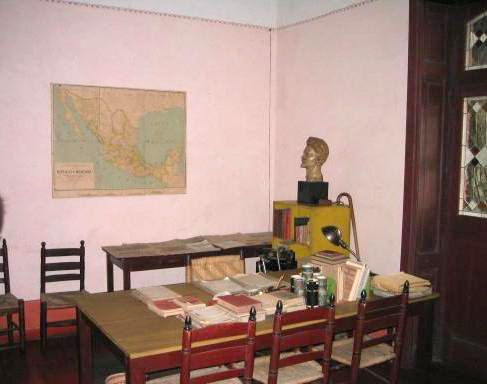
The study in Coyoacán, Mexico City, where Leon Trotsky was assassinated with an ice axe on 20 August 1940

After a failed assassination attempt in March 1939, Stalin assigned the NKVD officer Pavel Sudoplatov to organise Trotsky's murder. Sudoplatov, in turn, co-opted Nahum Eitingon. According to Sudoplatov's Special Tasks, the NKVD set up three autonomous agent networks for the task, separate from existing US and Mexican spy networks.

On 24 May 1940 Trotsky survived a raid on his villa by armed assassins led by the NKVD agent Iosif Grigulevich and the Mexican painter David Alfaro Siqueiros. Trotsky's 14-year-old grandson, Vsevolod Platonovich "Esteban" Volkov (7 March 1926 – 16 June 2023), was shot in the foot. A young assistant and bodyguard, Robert Sheldon Harte, disappeared with the attackers and was later found murdered; it is probable he was an accomplice who granted them access. Trotsky's other guards fended off the attackers. Following this, Trotsky wrote an article, "Stalin Seeks My Death" (8 June 1940), stating another attempt was certain.

On 20 August 1940 Trotsky was attacked in his study by the Spanish-born NKVD agent Ramón Mercader, who used an ice axe. (Note: The murder weapon was an ice axe (not an ice pick, an awl-like bartender's tool). This misnomer likely arose from the assassin's use of the French term piolet (referring to the mountaineering tool resembling a pickaxe) and the multiple languages involved in reporting. Many historical sources confuse the two tools.) The operation was codenamed "Utka" (Duck) within the NKVD. A mountaineering ice axe has a narrow pick and a flat, wide adze. The adze struck Trotsky, fracturing his parietal bone and penetrating 7 cm (2.8 in) into his brain. The blow was bungled and failed to kill him instantly. Witnesses stated Trotsky spat on Mercader and struggled fiercely, breaking Mercader's hand. Hearing the commotion, Trotsky's bodyguards burst in and nearly beat Mercader to death, but Trotsky stopped them, laboriously stating the assassin should be made to answer questions. Trotsky was taken to a hospital and operated on but died at age 60 on 21 August 1940 from blood loss and shock. Mercader later testified:

I laid my raincoat on the table in such a way as to be able to remove the ice axe which was in the pocket. I decided not to miss the wonderful opportunity that presented itself. The moment Trotsky began reading the article, he gave me my chance; I took out the ice axe from the raincoat, gripped it in my hand and, with my eyes closed, dealt him a terrible blow on the head.

According to James P. Cannon, secretary of the American Socialist Workers Party, Trotsky's last words were "I will not survive this attack. Stalin has finally accomplished the task he attempted unsuccessfully before." Mercader was convicted and spent 20 years in a Mexican prison. Stalin claimed the assassin was a dangerous Trotskyist. Mercader initially received no awards, though his mother was presented with the Order of Lenin for her role. Upon his release in 1960 and arrival in the USSR in 1961, Leonid Brezhnev signed a decree awarding Mercader the Order of Lenin, the Gold Star, and the title Hero of the Soviet Union "for the special deed". KGB boss Alexander Shelepin presented these awards to Mercader personally.

An estimated 300,000 people passed by Trotsky's funeral casket in Mexico City over several days by 27 August 1940.

== Personality and characteristics ==
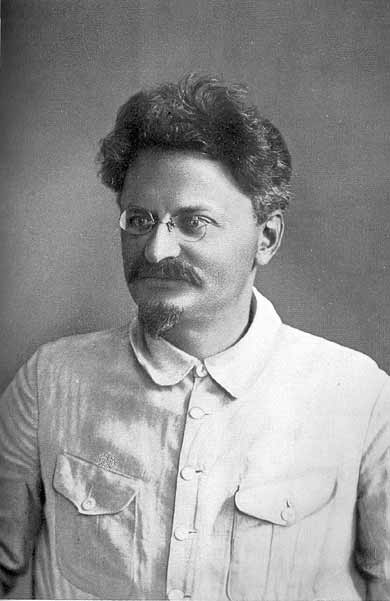
Portrait as Commissar of the Red Army, 1920

Trotsky was regarded as an outstanding orator, preeminent theoretician, and organiser who, in the historian Michael Kort's view, "forged and directed the Red Army". He was an original Politburo member in Lenin's government. The biographer Isaac Deutscher considered him the "prompter of [the] planned economy and industrialization" in the early Soviet Union.

The Old Bolshevik Anatoly Lunacharsky viewed Trotsky as the best-prepared Social Democratic leader during the 1905–1907 revolution, stating he "emerged from the revolution having acquired an enormous degree of popularity, whereas neither Lenin nor Martov had effectively gained any at all". His personal secretary and later historian of mathematical logic, Jean van Heijenoort, found him amicable, inquisitive, and occasionally charming with new acquaintances in his final years in Mexico.

The historian Dmitri Volkogonov characterised him as a "vivid, complex, multi-faceted personality... remembered with hatred and respect, anger and admiration" decades after his assassination. Volkogonov considered Trotsky "far superior" to figures like Vyacheslav Molotov, Lazar Kaganovich, Zhdanov, and "also superior to Stalin and Stalin knew it".

His biographer Robert Service described him as "volatile and untrustworthy", an "arrogant individual" who impressed supporters even during "personal adversity in the 1920s and 1930s" but failed to "coax and encourage them to the full". Service stated Trotsky gave "minimum time to the Jewish question" and believed "he ceased to be a Jew in any important sense because Marxism had burned out the fortuitous residues of his origins".

The political scientist August Nimtz regarded Trotsky as having better foresight than many Marxist and non-Marxist observers with his work The Revolution Betrayed (1936), arguing the Stalinist regime was an "ephemeral phenomenon", a view Nimtz believed was proven by the Soviet collapse after 1989. Other scholars have similarly described Trotsky's prescient judgement on events like the Stalinist alliance with the Kuomintang, the rise of Nazi Germany, and the Spanish Civil War. Deutscher also referenced his "uncanny clear sightedness" in predicting the emergence of a single dictator who would "substitute himself" for the Central Committee, the party, and the working class.

Trotsky was a Marxist intellectual. The Russian historian Vladimir Buldakov considered Trotsky, in some respects, a "typical representative" of "Russia's radical intelligentsia" with "elements of bourgeois origin". His diverse and profound interests exceeded those of other Bolshevik theoreticians like Nikolai Bukharin. Aside from political activism, Trotsky worked as a statistician and journalist. He loved literature, particularly French novels. He and Natalia Sedova enjoyed Viennese galleries and visited museums like the Louvre and Tate Gallery. He retained a personal interest in science from his youth studying engineering, mathematics, and physics.

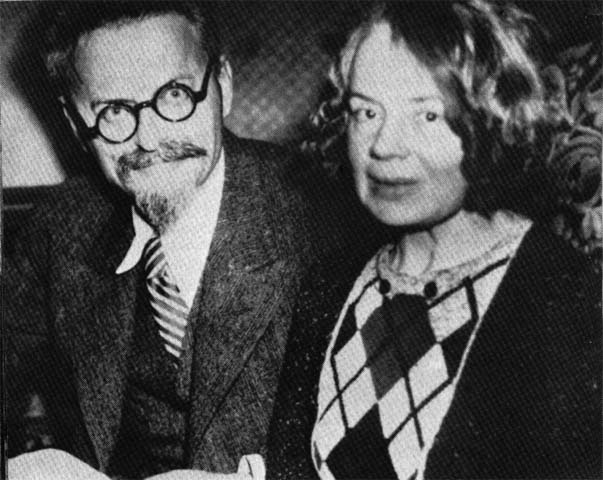
Trotsky with his second wife, Natalia Sedova, in 1932

His arch-enemy, Stalin, read and sometimes appreciated much of his writing. According to Rubenstein, Stalin acknowledged that "after Lenin, Trotsky was the most popular figure in the country" at the Civil War's end. Stalin himself wrote in a 1918 Pravda editorial: "All practical work in connection with the organization of the uprising was done under the immediate direction of Comrade Trotsky, the president of the Petrograd Soviet".

Upon his 1929 exile, eighteen close relatives remained in the Soviet Union; all faced repression. Seven family members, including his son Sergei Sedov, sister Olga Kameneva, and brother Aleksandr Bronstein, were shot. He spoke several European languages "with a markedly Russian accent" and identified as a cosmopolitan and internationalist. Trotsky wrote about 30,000 documents, most now in archives. Deutscher stated Trotsky wrote most Soviet manifestos and resolutions, edited its Izvestia newspaper, and composed the Red Army's oath of loyalty.

== Political stature and conflicts with Stalin ==
Had Trotsky won the struggle to succeed Lenin, the character of the Soviet regime would almost certainly have been substantially different, particularly in foreign policy, cultural policy, and the extent of terroristic repression. Trotsky's failure, however, seems to have been almost inevitable, considering his own qualities and the conditions of authoritarian rule by the Communist Party organization.

— The historian Robert Vincent Daniels, 1993

Trotsky lacked the political acumen to succeed against Stalin's machinations. Lenin had encouraged Trotsky to challenge Stalin at the Twelfth Party Congress over the Georgian Affair, but Trotsky relented. The historian Martin McCauley commented that Trotsky "displayed a lamentable lack of political judgement" on multiple occasions, such as declining Lenin's proposal to become deputy chairman of Sovnarkom, failing to build a power base before forming a bloc with Lenin against the Orgburo, and not immediately recognising the troika established to prevent his succession. The biographer Joshua Rubenstein attributed Trotsky's decision to decline Lenin's proposal to his belief the position had "little authority of its own" and overlapped with other government and party officials. Deutscher believed he underestimated Stalin's cunning, ruthlessness, and tenacity on several occasions.

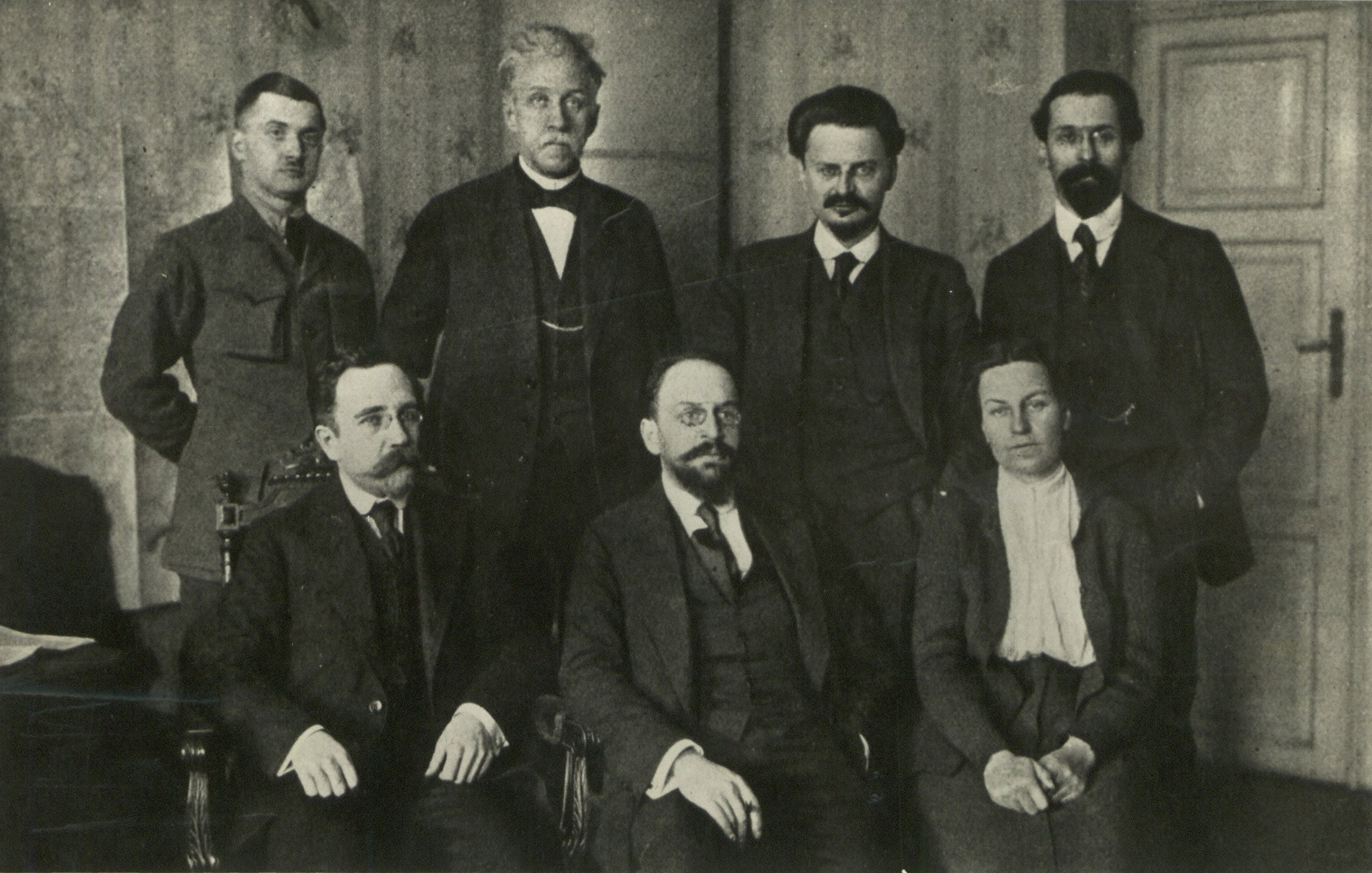
Trotsky (third from left, back row) as People's Commissar for Foreign Affairs with the Soviet delegation at Brest-Litovsk, 1917–1918

His enmity with Stalin developed during the Civil War due to Stalin's disregard for military specialists whom Trotsky considered indispensable. In Tsaritsyn, Stalin ordered several specialists imprisoned on a barge in the Volga; the floating prison was sunk, and the officers perished. Another instance was Stalin's disobedience of Trotsky's order to march on Warsaw, contributing to the Red Army's defeat at the Battle of Warsaw in 1920. The former Politburo secretary Boris Bazhanov claimed Stalin's antagonism also stemmed from Trotsky's Jewishness and that Stalin refused to obey his military orders during the Civil War. According to Rogovin, Trotsky received hundreds of letters reporting the use of antisemitic methods during the inter-party struggle between Stalin and the United Opposition.

With all the greater frankness can I state how, in my view, the Soviet government should act in case of a fascist upheaval in Germany. In their place, I would, at the very moment of receiving telegraphic news of this event, sign a mobilisation order calling up several age groups. In the face of a mortal enemy, when the logic of the situation points to inevitable war, it would be irresponsible and unpardonable to give that enemy time to establish himself, to consolidate his positions, to conclude alliances… and to work out the plan to attack.

— Trotsky describing in 1932 the military measures he would have taken, in place of Stalin, to counter the rise of Nazi Germany.

Rubenstein regarded Trotsky's position among Soviet elites as largely dependent on Lenin, adding that he had an outsider image within party circles as he had previously been an "outspoken critic of Lenin". Conversely, Volkogonov stated Trotsky had the support of many party intellectuals, but this was overshadowed by Stalin's control of the vast party apparatus, including the GPU and party cadres.

Trotsky attributed his political defeat to external, objective conditions rather than Stalin's individual qualities. He argued that failed international insurrections (e.g., Bulgaria 1923, China 1927) diminished prospects for world socialism and demoralised the Russian working class, strengthening internal Soviet bureaucracy. The Russian historian Vadim Rogovin remarked that Trotsky, in the 1930s, did not abandon hope for revolutionary spread, arguing his prognosis was plausible as many European countries (Germany, France, especially Spain) "went through a period of revolutionary crisis". However, Daniels contended Trotsky would have been no more prepared than other Bolsheviks to risk war or lose trade opportunities, despite his support for world revolution.

== Relations with Lenin ==
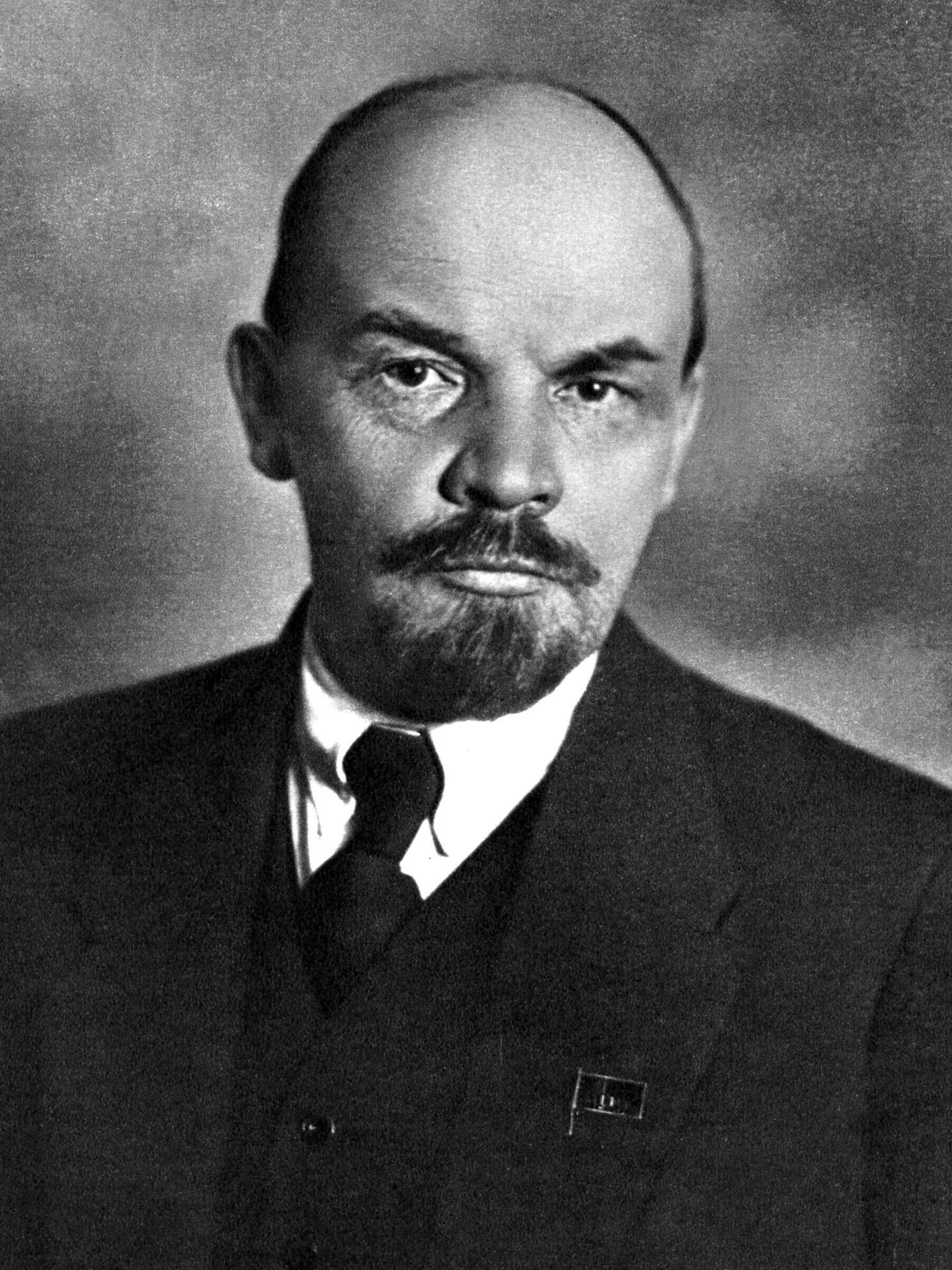
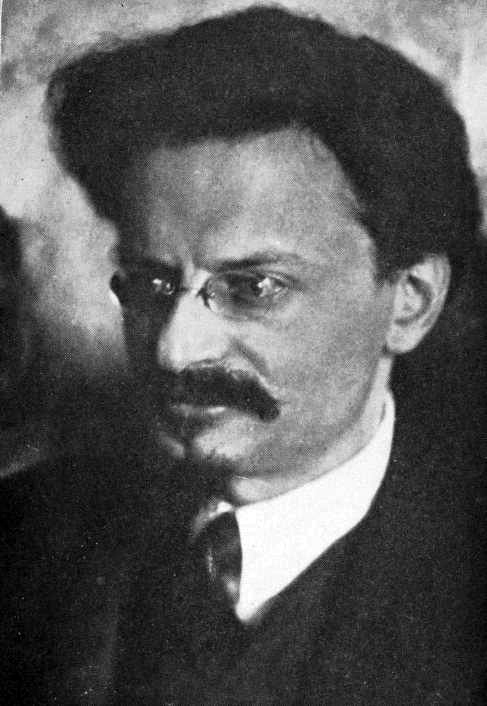
Lenin and Trotsky (both photographed in 1920) were viewed as the leading figures in the first Soviet government.

Trotsky's relationship with Lenin is a source of intense historical debate. The historian Paul Le Blanc and the philosopher Michael Löwy described Lenin and Trotsky as the "widely leading figures in the Russia's Bolshevik Revolution of 1917 as well as in the final years of the rising world communist movement".

Swain, however, viewed the notion of Trotsky as Lenin's natural heir as a myth, citing scholars like Erik Van Ree, James D. White, and Richard B. Day, who challenged the traditional characterisation of their relationship. Le Blanc disputed Swain's representation, referencing historians across generations including E. H. Carr, Isaac Deutscher, Moshe Lewin, Ronald Grigor Suny, and W. Bruce Lincoln. According to Le Blanc, these historians generally supported the view that Lenin desired a collective leadership in which Trotsky played an important role, and within which Stalin would be dramatically demoted or removed.

The historian Roy Medvedev noted the close association of Trotsky and Lenin in the Soviet republic from 1921 to 1924, mentioning public commendations where "greetings in honour of comrades Lenin and Trotsky were announced at many rallies and meetings, and portraits of Lenin and Trotsky hung on the walls of many Soviet and party institutions".

=== Lenin's succession ===
Comrade Trotsky, on the other hand, as his struggle against the C.C. on the question of the People's Commissariat of Communications has already proved, is distinguished not only by outstanding ability. He is personally perhaps the most capable man in the present C.C., but he has displayed excessive self-assurance and shown excessive preoccupation with the purely administrative side of the work.

— Lenin's Testament, 1923 Most historians consider the document an accurate reflection of Lenin's views.

Trotsky was generally viewed as Lenin's choice as a successor in 1923. He had been nominated as Lenin's deputy in 1922 and 1923 and was expected to assume responsibility over the Council of National Economy or Gosplan. Lenin and Trotsky were the only Soviet leaders elected honorary presidents of the Communist International. Before the 1921 factional ban, Trotsky had considerable support among party activists and Central Committee members against Lenin's narrow majority. His supporters also controlled the Orgburo and Party Secretariat before Stalin's appointment as General Secretary. McCauley states Lenin planned to retire and arranged for Trotsky to speak on his behalf as his natural successor, which triggered the troika's formation. The historian Orlando Figes highlighted the increasing alignment between Lenin and Trotsky in 1923, citing Lenin's testament (critical of Stalin and bureaucracy) and their shared positions on foreign trade, party reform, and the Georgian affair.

The Soviet historian Victor Danilov believed Lenin's proposed appointment of Trotsky as deputy "would have made him in effect Lenin's successor". Danilov cited Politburo Secretary Bazhanov's notes of Trotsky's concluding speech in 1923, where Trotsky explained declining the deputy position due to concerns his "Jewish origins" could accentuate antisemitic attitudes towards the Soviet Union. McCauley stated Trotsky would "almost certainly" have become successor had Lenin died after his first stroke in 1922. Deutscher noted Zinoviev was Lenin's closest disciple from 1907 to 1917, but Zinoviev's opposition to the October Revolution strained his relations with Lenin.

Opponents like Winston Churchill argued "Lenin [had] indeed regarded Trotsky as his political heir" and sought to protect him before his 1924 death. In My Life, Trotsky maintained Lenin intended him as successor as Chairman of the Council of People's Commissars, beginning with his proposed appointment as deputy. He explained this process would have started after their 1923 alliance with a commission to mitigate state bureaucracy, facilitating his party succession.

During the dispute about whether to maintain the state monopoly on foreign trade in particular Lenin and Trotsky closed ranks. Too sick to attend the meeting himself Lenin, in a letter addressed to Stalin on 15 December 1922, stated, "I have also come to an arrangement with Trotsky to stand up for my views of the foreign trade monopoly" and "If the idea should arise ... to postpone it until the next plenum, I should most resolutely object to this, because I am sure that Trotsky will be able to stand up for my views just as well as I myself". Following the plenum rescinding their proposal to relax the foreign trade monopoly, Lenin wrote to Trotsky on 18 December 1922, "It looks as though it has been possible to take the position without a single shot, by a simple maneuver. I suggest that we should not stop and should continue the offensive".

== Legacy ==
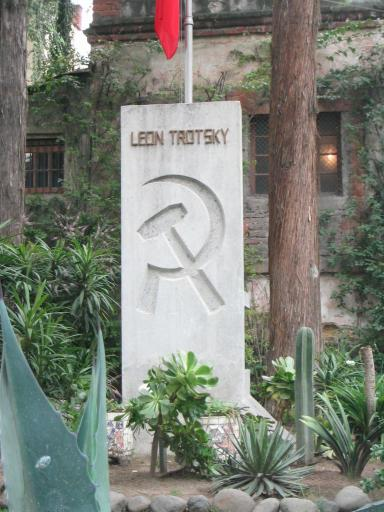
Trotsky's grave in Coyoacán, Mexico City, where his ashes are interred.

In 1923 the historic town of Gatchina in Petrograd Governorate (now Leningrad Oblast) was renamed Trotsk (Russian: Троцк) by Soviet authorities after Trotsky. After Stalin became General Secretary, Trotsky was gradually exiled, and the town was renamed Krasnogvardeysk (Красногварде́йск, Red Guard City) in 1929. In 1944, to boost morale, its historic name Gatchina was restored.

Trotsky's house in Coyoacán is preserved much as it was on the day of his assassination and is now the Leon Trotsky House Museum, run by a board that included his grandson Esteban Volkov (1926–2023). His grave is on its grounds. The "International Friends of the Leon Trotsky Museum" foundation raises funds to improve the museum.

Shortly before his assassination, Trotsky agreed to sell most of his remaining papers to Harvard University. After his death, his widow, Natalya Sedova, collected his remaining papers and sent them to Harvard. Over the years, Harvard acquired additional papers hidden from Soviet and Nazi agents in Europe. These papers now occupy 65 feet (20 m) of shelf space in Harvard's Houghton Library.

Trotsky was never rehabilitated by the Soviet government, despite de-Stalinisation-era rehabilitations of most other Old Bolsheviks. His son, Sergei Sedov (died 1937), was rehabilitated in 1988, as was Nikolai Bukharin. Beginning in 1989, Trotsky's books, forbidden until 1987, were published in the Soviet Union. Trotsky was rehabilitated on 16 June 2001 by the General Prosecutor's Office of the Russian Federation.

The historian Harold Shukman assessed conflicting perspectives on Trotsky's legacy:

Trotsky's legacy, unlike those of Stalin and Lenin, had long been submerged and obliterated as a topic of debate, and his place in Soviet history books had correspondingly diminished to one of no importance. For Western readers, however, Trotsky has always been one of the most enigmatic and powerful personalities of the Russian revolution, a Mephistophelian figure whose life ended in an appropriately dramatic way.

The political theorist and chairman of the International Editorial Board of the Trotskyist World Socialist Web Site, associated with the International Committee of the Fourth International, David North, attributed Trotsky's diminished historical influence to the "virtually unlimited resources of the Soviet regime, and of Stalinist-run parties throughout the world, [which] were devoted to blackguarding Trotsky as an anti-Soviet saboteur, terrorist and fascist agent. Within the Soviet Union, his political co-thinkers, past and present, were ruthlessly exterminated". North also criticised biographical literature on Trotsky by some historians (Ian Thatcher, Geoffrey Swain, Robert Service), viewing these trends as a "confluence of neo-Stalinist falsification and traditional Anglo-American anti-Communism".

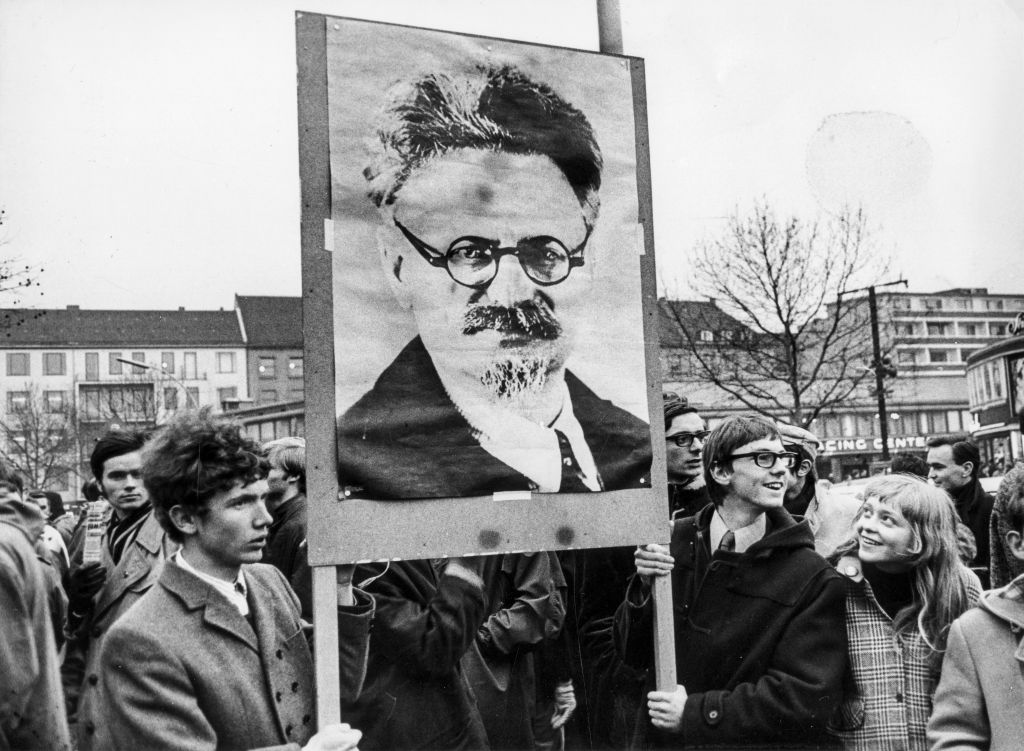
West German students holding a placard of Trotsky during protests in 1968

In 2018 the University College London Professor of Management John Kelly wrote that "almost 80 years after Leon Trotsky founded the Fourth International, there are now Trotskyite organisations in 57 countries, including most of Western Europe and Latin America". However, he argued no Trotskyist group had ever led a revolution or built an enduring mass political party. The historian Christian Høgsbjerg countered that academic literature on Trotskyism minimised its historical role in building social movements, stressing British Trotskyists' key role in the Vietnam Solidarity Campaign (1966–1971), Anti-Nazi League (1977–1981), All Britain Anti-Poll Tax Federation (1989–1991), and Stop the War Coalition (from 2001).

Outside the Fourth International, Trotsky has been admired by figures including the philosopher Jean-Paul Sartre, the military general Mikhail Tukhachevsky, the Marxist theorist Rosa Luxemburg, the economist Paul Sweezy, the philosopher John Dewey, the historian A. J. P. Taylor, the psychoanalyst Erich Fromm, the philosopher Alasdair MacIntyre, the literary critic Edmund Wilson, the painter Diego Rivera, the socialist leader Martin Tranmæl, and the writer Lu Xun.

== Historical reputation ==
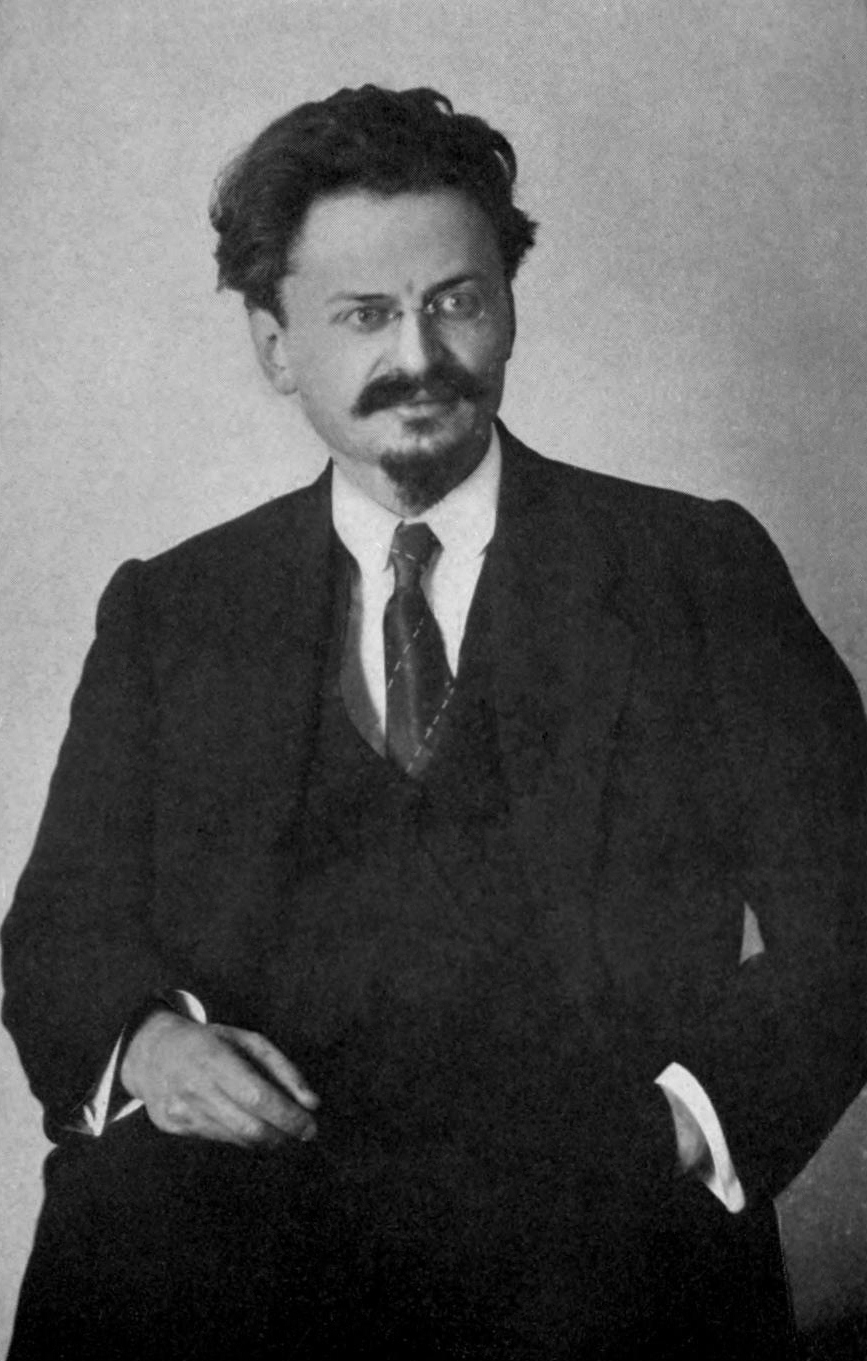
Trotsky, c. 1918

Trotsky's legacy in modern historiography has evoked a range of conflicting and diverse interpretations. Before the October Revolution, he was part of an old radical democracy which included Left Mensheviks and Left Bolsheviks. By 1917, Bolshevik figures like Anatoly Lunacharsky, Moisei Uritsky, and Dmitry Manuilsky held him in comparable stature to Lenin; with the October insurrection having been carried through in accordance with Trotsky's plan of action. He was viewed by contemporaries in the early Soviet period and a number of later historians as the hero of the revolution.

In the Soviet Union his reputation deteriorated during the succession struggle as his views were presented as sectarian and anti-Leninist. Throughout the Stalin era, his name and image were erased from history books, museums, and films, becoming a convenient bogeyman associated with ideological heresy. His works remained banned until the Gorbachev era. After de-Stalinisation, later Soviet and Russian historians re-evaluated his role with varying interpretations.

Scholarly consensus holds that Trotsky had demonstrated remarkable leadership of the Red Army during the Civil War. He received the Order of the Red Banner for his role, including organising Petrograd's defence when other Bolshevik leaders were prepared to abandon it. Swain asserted the Bolsheviks would certainly have lost the Civil War within a year without Trotsky leading the Red Army.

Some scholars and Western socialists have argued that Trotsky represented a more democratic alternative to Stalin, emphasising his pre-Civil War activities and leadership of the Left Opposition. Deutscher described Trotsky as the "Soviet's moving spirit" in 1905, representing Bolsheviks, Mensheviks, and other Soviets. Trotsky proposed electing a new Soviet presidium with other socialist parties based on proportional representation in September 1917. Rogovin argued the Left Opposition, led by Trotsky, represented a "real alternative to Stalinism", which was Stalin's primary motive for the Great Terror. Daniels stated that the most distinctive features of Stalin's rule such as his campaigns against "bourgeois experts" as seen with "the Shakhty trials, his contemptuous anti-intellectualism and the dogmatization of Marxism, the purges—run totally counter to Trotsky's thought".

Conversely, figures such as Volkogonov have strongly criticised his defence of the Red Terror and the dictatorship of the proletariat. Service argued that his "ideas and practices laid several foundation stones for the erection of the Stalinist political, economic, social and even cultural edifice". Cherniaev considered Trotsky largely responsible for establishing a one-party, authoritarian state and initiating military practices like summary executions, which later became standard in the Stalinist era. Thatcher cited Trotsky's defence of terror in Terrorism and Communism: A Reply to Karl Kautsky but acknowledged his capacity for leniency, noting he personally urged humane treatment for White army deserters.

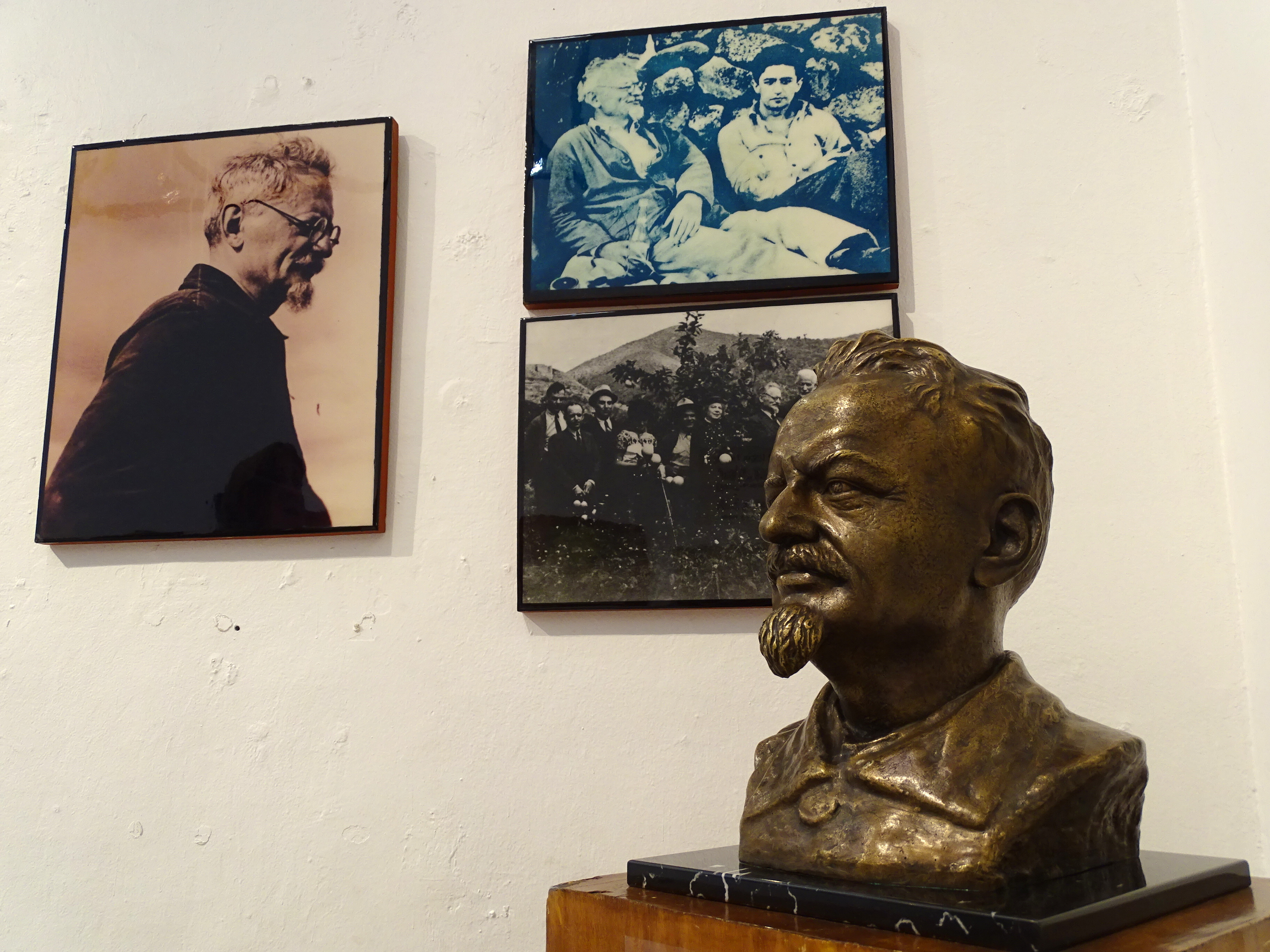
Bust of Trotsky by Duncan Ferguson at the Leon Trotsky House Museum in Coyoacán, Mexico City

Other writers believe Trotsky has been maligned and caricatured, necessitating historical reappraisal. The French socialist Pierre Broué criticised Western representations of Trotsky's role in the Kronstadt rebellion, arguing they falsely presented him as the principal figure responsible for the repression. Broué added that military tribunals and executions for desertion were common features of all wars, not exclusive to the Red Army under Trotsky. The historian Bertrand Patenaude regarded Service's characterisation of Trotsky as a "mass murderer and a terrorist" as reflective of a wider attempt to discredit him, noting Service's work featured inaccuracies and distortions of the historical record.

Various historians have credited Trotsky and the Left Opposition with shifting Soviet economic orientation from the New Economic Policy towards a planned economy through their proposals for mass industrialisation. Trotsky delivered a joint report to the April 1926 Central Committee Plenum proposing national industrialisation and replacing annual plans with five-year plans. His proposals were rejected by the Central Committee majority (controlled by the troika) and derided by Stalin at the time. The eventual adoption of five-year plans in 1928 served as the basis for Soviet modernisation.

Several scholars have regarded his historical writings on the Soviet bureaucracy as having considerable influence in shaping the receptive attitudes of later Marxists and many non-Marxists. Trotsky associated bureaucratism with authoritarianism, excessive centralism, and conservatism. The political scientist Baruch Knei-Paz argued Trotsky did more than any other political figure to "show the historical and social roots of Stalinism" as a bureaucratic system. Stafford Beer, a British cyberneticist who worked on the decentralised form of economic planning, Project Cybersyn (1970–1973), was reportedly influenced by Trotsky's critique of the Soviet bureaucracy. Professional historians have noted the literary value of his social analysis in works like 1905 and The History of the Russian Revolution for wider historiography.

== Political ideology and contributions to Marxism ==
Trotsky considered himself a "Bolshevik-Leninist", advocating for the establishment of a vanguard party. He viewed himself as an advocate of orthodox Marxism. Trotsky adhered to scientific socialism, seeing it as a conscious expression of historical processes. His politics differed from those of Stalin or Mao Zedong, most importantly in his rejection of "socialism in one country" and his insistence on the need for an international "permanent revolution".

Trotsky reading The Militant, circa 1936

In the post-Lenin struggle, Trotsky and the Left/United Opposition advocated rapid industrialisation, voluntary agricultural collectivisation, and the expansion of workers' democracy. In 1936 Trotsky called for restoring the right of criticism in areas like economic policy, revitalising trade unions, and allowing free elections involving multiple Soviet parties. In the Transitional Program (drafted for the 1938 founding congress of the Fourth International), Trotsky reiterated the need for political pluralism and workers' control of production. Supporters of the Fourth International echo Trotsky's opposition to Stalinist totalitarianism, advocating political revolution and arguing socialism cannot sustain itself without democracy.

=== Economic programme ===
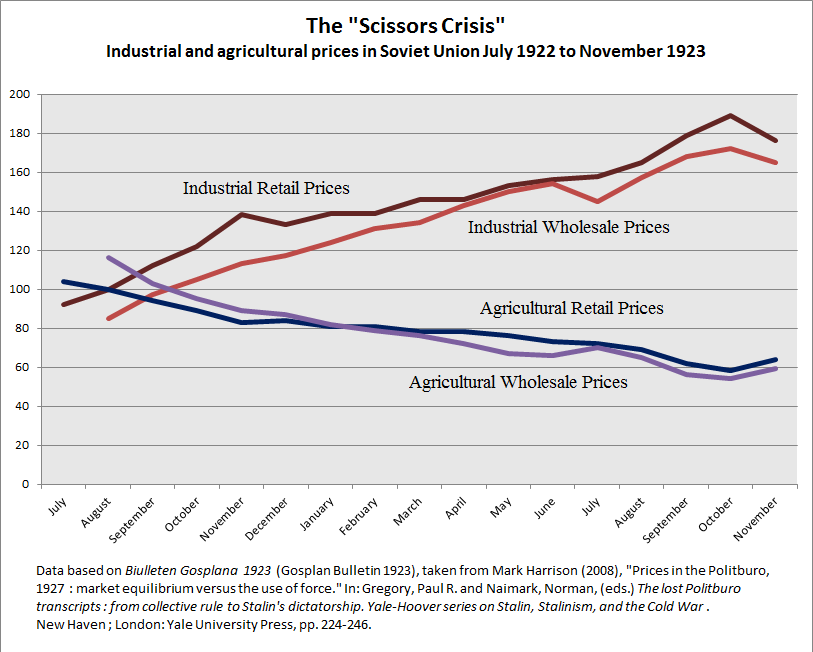
The Scissor crisis: retail and wholesale prices of agricultural and industrial goods in the Soviet Union, July 1922 to November 1923

Trotsky was an early proponent of economic planning (from 1923) and favoured accelerated industrialisation. In 1921 he supported strengthening Gosplan to guide balanced economic reconstruction after the Civil War. He also urged economic decentralisation between the state, oblast regions, and factories to counter inefficiency and bureaucracy.

He had proposed the principles underlying the New Economic Policy (NEP) in 1920 to mitigate urgent economic problems from war communism, later privately reproaching Lenin for the delayed government response in 1921–1922. His position differed from the majority who fully supported the NEP. Trotsky believed planning and NEP should coexist in a mixed framework until the socialist sector gradually superseded private industry. He found allies among economic theorists and administrators like Yevgeni Preobrazhensky and Georgy Pyatakov (deputy chairman of the Supreme Soviet of the National Economy). Intellectuals formed the core of the Left Opposition during the succession period.

Trotsky specified the need for "overall guidance in planning i.e. the systematic co-ordination of the fundamental sectors of the state economy in the process of adapting to the present market" and urged for a national plan alongside currency stabilisation. He rejected the Stalinist focus on heavy industry, proposing instead the use of foreign trade as an accelerator and directing investments via comparative coefficients.

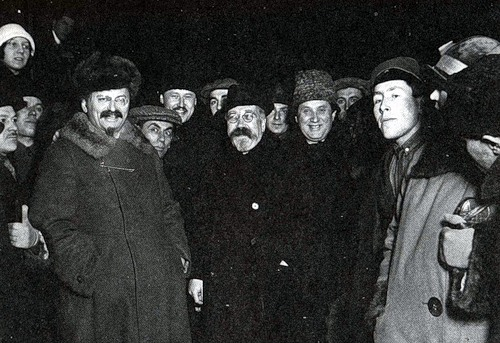
Trotsky, Lev Kamenev, and Gregory Zinoviev pictured in the mid-1920s as members of the United Opposition

In response to the Scissors Crisis (1923–1924), which strained worker-peasant relations, Trotsky and the Left Opposition developed economic proposals including a progressive tax on wealthier groups (kulaks, NEPmen), balancing import-export to purchase machinery abroad, and accelerating industrialisation. In 1932–1933, Trotsky maintained the need for mass participation in economic planning. When questioned by the Dewey Commission in 1937 about industrialisation, he emphasised the need for Soviet democracy:

The successes are very important, and I affirmed it every time. They are due to the abolition of private property and to the possibilities inherent in planned economy. But, they – I cannot say exactly – but I will say two or three times less than they could be under a regime of Soviet democracy.

According to Fitzpatrick, the scholarly consensus is that Stalin appropriated the Left Opposition's position on industrialisation and collectivisation. Other scholars argue Trotsky's economic programme differed from Stalin's forced collectivisation (post-1928) due to the latter's brutality.

=== Permanent Revolution ===
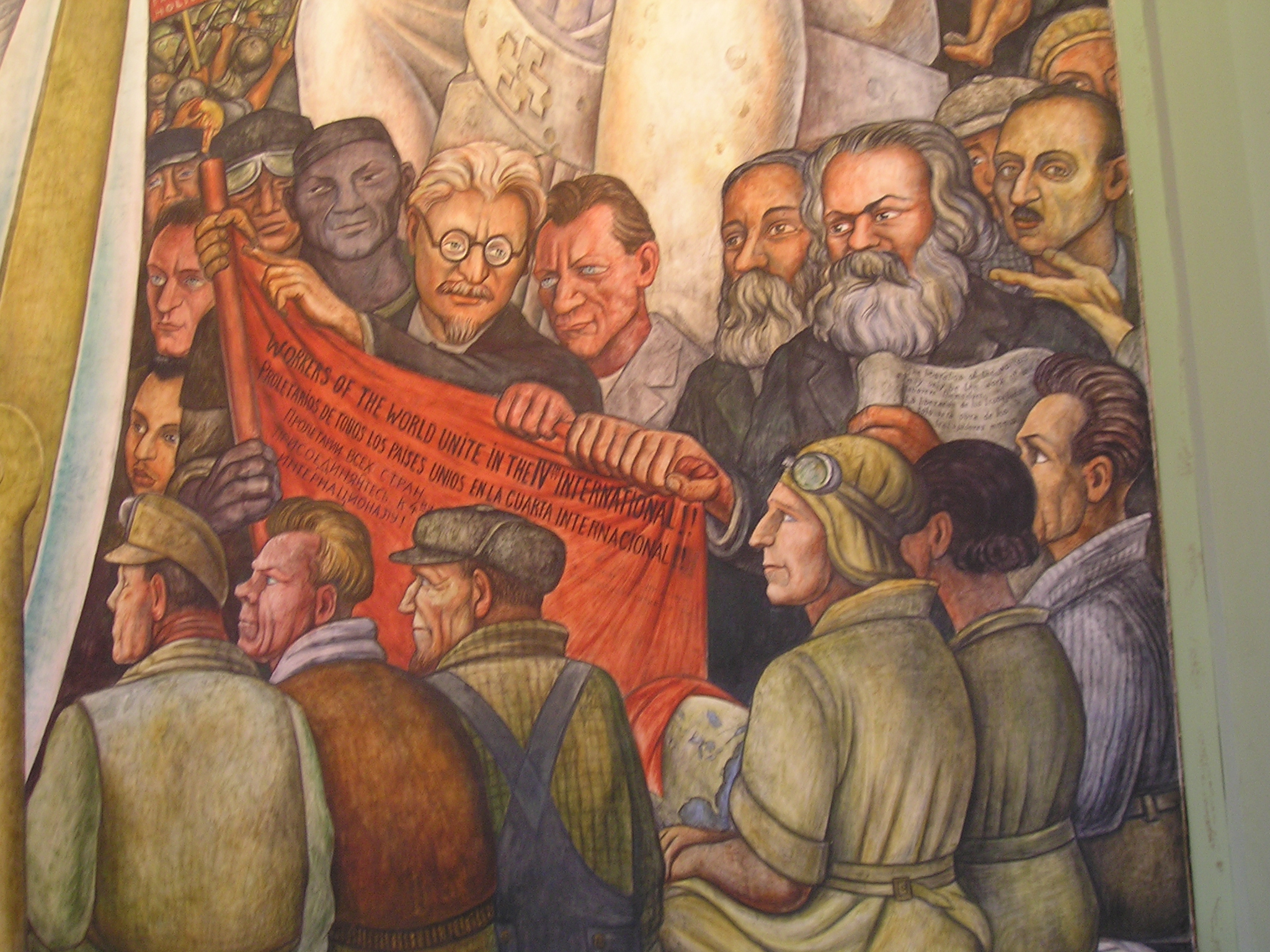
A Diego Rivera mural (Man, Controller of the Universe) depicts Trotsky (right, grey suit) with Marx (centre, white beard) and Engels (behind Marx), presenting them as champions of the workers' struggle.

Permanent Revolution theory holds that in countries with delayed bourgeois democratic development, these tasks can only be accomplished by establishing a workers' state, which inevitably involves inroads against capitalist property. Thus, bourgeois democratic tasks transition into proletarian ones. Though closely associated with Trotsky, the call for "Permanent Revolution" first appeared in Karl Marx's and Friedrich Engels's March 1850 Address to the Central Committee of the Communist League:

It is our interest and our task to make the revolution permanent until all the more or less propertied classes have been driven from their ruling positions, until the proletariat has conquered state power and until the association of the proletarians has progressed sufficiently far—not only in one country but in all the leading countries of the world—that competition between the proletarians of these countries ceases and at least the decisive forces of production are concentrated in the hands of the workers. ... Their battle-cry must be: The Permanent Revolution.

Trotsky's conception, drawing on the Russian Marxist founder Georgy Plekhanov, argued that in "backward" countries, the bourgeoisie itself could not achieve bourgeois democratic tasks. Trotsky developed this with Alexander Parvus in 1904–1905. Relevant articles were collected in Trotsky's 1905 and Permanent Revolution (which includes his essay "Results and Prospects"). Some Trotskyists argue the state of the Third World demonstrates capitalism offers no way forward for underdeveloped countries, proving the theory's central tenet.

According to Deutscher, Trotsky supported revolution through proletarian internationalism but opposed achieving it via military conquest. Deutscher cites Trotsky's opposition to the Polish–Soviet War (1920), his proposed armistice with the Entente, and his temperance regarding staging anti-British revolts in the Middle East.

=== United front and theory of fascism ===
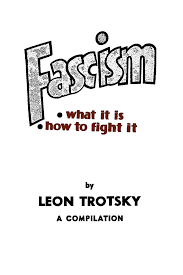
Leon Trotsky's pamphlet Fascism: What It Is and How to Fight It, based on his writings from the 1930s and published posthumously. It elaborated on the need for a united front for mass mobilisation against fascism.

Trotsky was a central figure in the Comintern during its first four congresses, helping generalise Bolshevik strategy and tactics to new Communist parties. From 1921, the united front—a method uniting revolutionaries and reformists in common struggle while winning workers to revolution—was the central tactic advocated by the Comintern after the German revolution's defeat.

Trotsky strongly criticised the shifting Comintern policy under Stalin that directed German Communists to treat social democrats as "social fascists". The historian Bertrand Patenaude believed this Comintern policy facilitated Hitler's rise. The Marxist theorist Hillel Ticktin argued Trotsky's political strategy, emphasising an organisational bloc between the German Communist Party and Social Democratic Party during the interwar period, likely would have prevented Hitler's ascent to power. Trotsky formulated a theory of fascism, analyzing Italian Fascism and the early emergence of Nazi Germany (1930–1933) through a dialectical interpretation.

After exile, Trotsky continued advocating a united front against fascism in Germany and Spain. According to Joseph Choonara of the British Socialist Workers Party, his articles on the united front represent an essential part of his political legacy.

=== Uneven and combined development ===
The concept of uneven and combined development derived from Trotsky's political theories. Developed alongside permanent revolution theory to explain Russia's historical context, he later elaborated on it to explain specific laws of uneven development (1930) and conditions for possible revolutionary scenarios. According to Thatcher, this theory was later generalised to "the entire history of mankind".

The political scientists Emanuele Saccarelli and Latha Varadarajan valued his theory as a "signal contribution" to international relations, arguing it presented "a specific understanding of capitalist development as 'uneven', insofar as it systematically featured geographically divergent 'advanced' and 'backward' regions" across the world economy.

=== Literary criticism and socialist culture ===
Faith merely promises to move mountains; but technology, which takes nothing 'on faith', is actually able to cut down mountains and move them. Up to now this was done for industrial purposes (mines) or for railways (tunnels); in the future this will be done on an immeasurably larger scale, according to a general industrial and artistic plan. Man will occupy himself with re-registering mountains and rivers, and will earnestly and repeatedly make improvements in nature.

— Trotsky, Literature and Revolution, 1924

In Literature and Revolution (1924) Trotsky examined aesthetic issues related to class and the Russian revolution. Soviet scholar Robert Bird considered it the "first systematic treatment of art by a Communist leader" and a catalyst for later Marxist cultural and critical theories. Trotsky defended intellectual autonomy regarding literary movements and scientific theories like Freudian psychoanalysis and Albert Einstein's theory of relativity, theories increasingly marginalised during the Stalin era. He later co-authored the 1938 Manifesto for an Independent Revolutionary Art with endorsements from André Breton and Diego Rivera. Trotsky's writings on literature, advocating tolerance, limited censorship, and respect for literary tradition (e.g., his 1923 survey), strongly appealed to the New York Intellectuals.

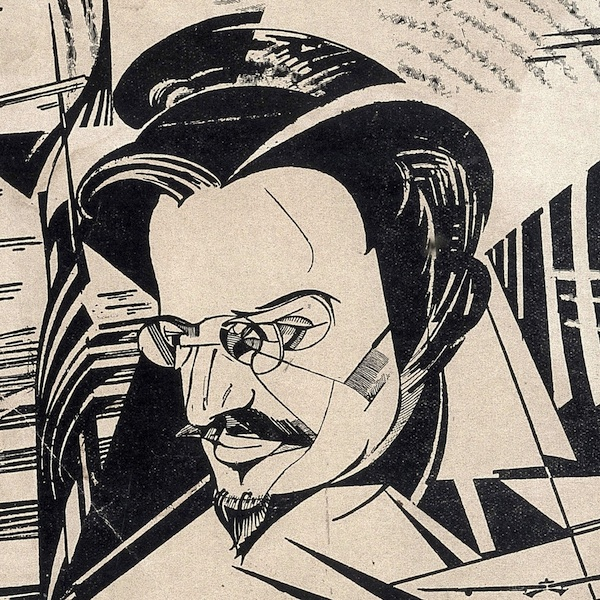
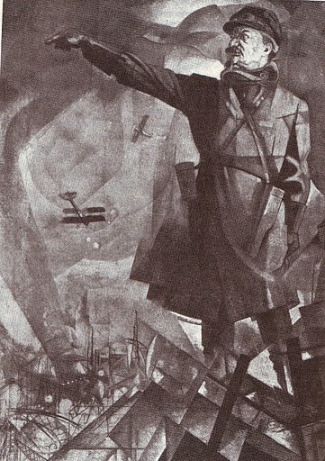
Cubist, stylised depictions of Trotsky attributed to Yury Annenkov, 1921–1922

Trotsky critiqued contemporary literary movements like Futurism and emphasised cultural autonomy for developing socialist culture. According to the literary critic Terry Eagleton, Trotsky recognised, "like Lenin on the need for a socialist culture to absorb the finest products of bourgeois art". Trotsky viewed proletarian culture as "temporary and transitional", providing foundations for a classless culture. He argued economic well-being and emancipation from material constraints were prerequisites for artistic creativity.

The political scientist Baruch Knei-Paz characterised Trotsky's view of the party's role as transmitting culture, raising educational standards, and facilitating entry into the cultural sphere, but leaving artistic creation (language, presentation) to the practitioner. Knei-Paz noted key distinctions between Trotsky's approach and Stalin's cultural policy in the 1930s.

== In popular culture ==
- The characters Snowball in George Orwell's Animal Farm (1945) and Emmanuel Goldstein in Nineteen Eighty-Four (1949) are based on Trotsky.
- The punk rock band The Stranglers refer to Trotsky in their 1977 single "No More Heroes" with the lyric "Whatever happened to Leon Trotsky? / He got an ice pick / That made his ears burn".
- The playwright David Ives wrote a short play, Variations on the Death of Trotsky, published in his 1994 collection All in the Timing.
- Trotsky's final days were dramatised in the film The Assassination of Trotsky (1972), directed by Joseph Losey and starring Richard Burton as Trotsky.
- The 1980s British band the Redskins' debut single was titled "Lev Bronstein", released on the CNT record label in 1982.
- The comedy film The Trotsky (2009) centres on a protagonist named Leon Bronstein (played by Jay Baruchel) who believes himself the reincarnation of Leon Trotsky.
- The eight-episode biographical drama Trotsky debuted on Russia's Channel One in 2017. Netflix acquired distribution rights in 2018.
- Trotsky is a character in the short film A Historical Mistake (2019) by Mikhail Mestetsky, in which he is portrayed by Mikhail Gorevoy.

== Biographies ==
- Leon Trotsky: A Revolutionary's Life by Joshua Rubenstein (2011).
- The Prophet: The Life of Leon Trotsky by Isaac Deutscher (1954–1963).
- The Prophet Armed: Trotsky, 1879–1921 by Isaac Deutscher (1954).
- The Prophet Unarmed: Trotsky, 1921–1929 by Isaac Deutscher (1959).
- The Prophet Outcast: Trotsky, 1929–1940 by Isaac Deutscher (1963).
- Trotsky: A Biography by Robert Service (2009).

== See also ==
- Outline of the Russian Revolution and Civil War
- Bibliography of the Russian Revolution and Civil War
- Bibliography of Stalinism and the Soviet Union
- Index of Old Bolsheviks
- Index of articles related to the Russian Revolution and Civil War
- Leon Trotsky: A Revolutionary's Life
- The Prophet: The Life of Leon Trotsky
- The Prophet Armed: Trotsky, 1879–1921
- The Prophet Unarmed: Trotsky, 1921–1929
- The Prophet Outcast: Trotsky, 1929–1940
- The Prophet: The Life of Leon Trotsky 3 vols.
- The Assassination of Trotsky, 1972 film
- Reds, 1981 film about the October Revolution
- Variations on the Death of Trotsky, 1991 play
- Trotsky, 2017 TV series

== Notes ==
Political offices
Preceded by Mikhail Tereshchenko (Minister of Foreign Affairs)	People's Commissar for Foreign Affairs; 1917–1918	Succeeded by Georgy Chicherin
Preceded by Nikolai Podvoisky	People's Commissar for Army and Navy Affairs; 1918–1925	Succeeded by Mikhail Frunze
Awards and achievements
Preceded by Winston Churchill	Cover of Time Magazine; 18 May 1925	Succeeded by Thomas A. Edison
Preceded by Newton D. Baker	Cover of Time Magazine; 21 November 1927	Succeeded by Frank Orren Lowden
Preceded by William S. Knudsen	Cover of Time Magazine; 25 January 1937	Succeeded by Thomas E. Dewey
