= Leon Trotsky House Museum =

- Museo Casa de León Trotsky

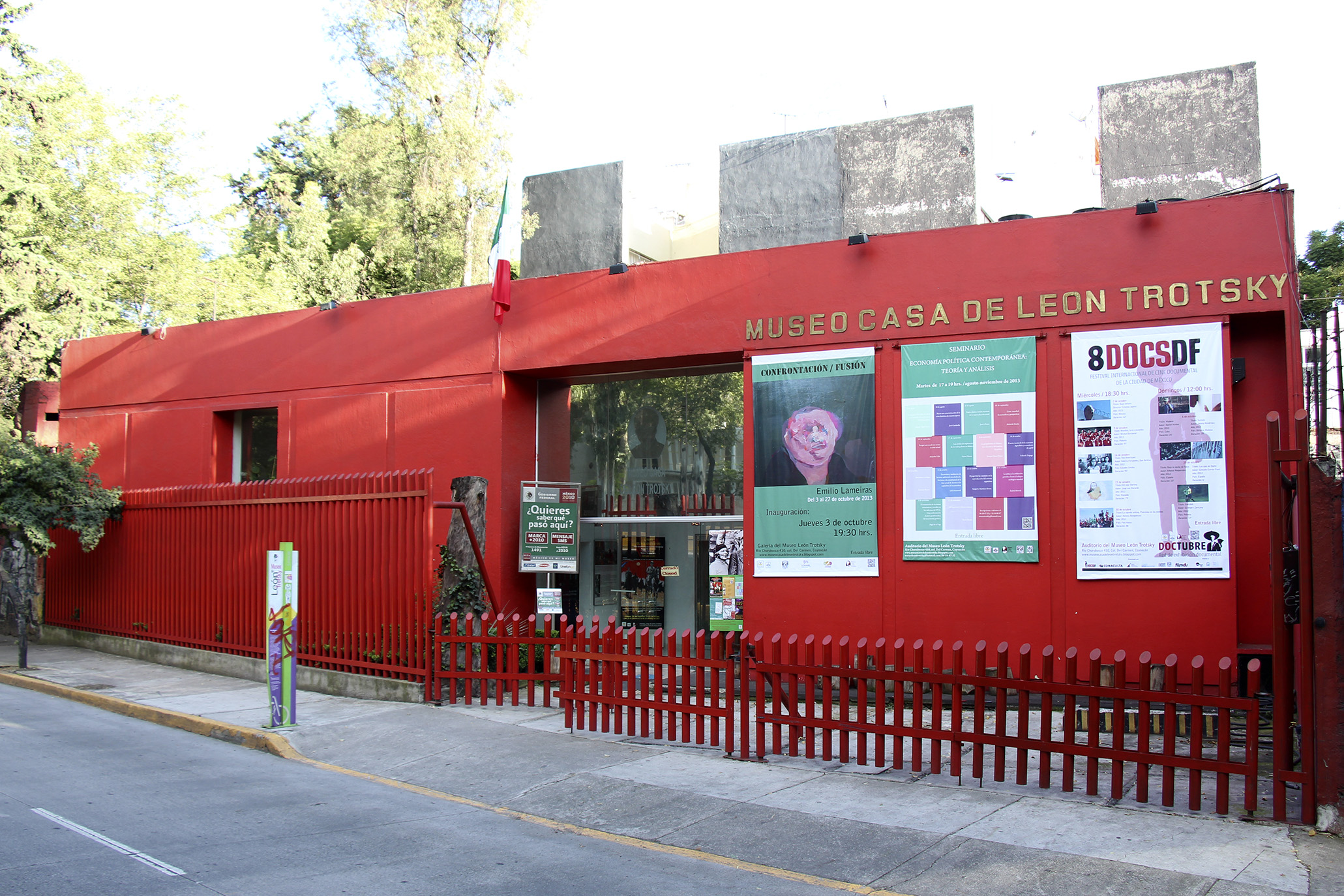
- Museum entrance
- Established: August 20, 1990
- Location: Mexico City
- Coordinates: 19.3578382°N 99.1595865°W
- Type: House museum
- Director: Gabriela Pérez

The Leon Trotsky House Museum, Trotsky Museum, or Trotsky House Museum, (Spanish: Museo Casa de León Trotsky) is a museum honoring Leon Trotsky and an organization that works to promote political asylum, located in the Coyoacán neighborhood of Mexico City. Its official name is Instituto del Derecho de Asilo - Museo Casa de León Trotsky (Right of Asylum Institute – Leon Trotsky House Museum).

The center of the complex is the house where Trotsky and his second wife, Natalia Sedova, lived from April 1939 to August 1940, and where Trotsky was murdered. The house has been kept as it was at that time, especially the study in which Ramón Mercader killed Trotsky with an ice axe to the back of the head. Around the house is a garden and high walls with watchtowers.

A former handball court—to the rear of the actual house—has been modified and incorporated into a library, contemporary gallery, permanent display, offices, and auditorium. It now serves as the main entrance to the museum on Río Churubusco 410.

The property was declared a historical monument by presidential decree in 1982, and the complex was turned into the current museum and asylum institution in 1990, on the 50th anniversary of the assassination.

== History ==
=== Trotsky’s exile ===
Trotsky was forced into exile outside the Soviet Union in February 1929 because of his criticism of Joseph Stalin's government. For the next eight years, Trotsky and his wife, Natalia Sedova, wandered among several countries under surveillance, and later under a death sentence due to Trotsky's persistent political activity against Stalin from exile. Trotsky was pursued by Stalinist agents, and other enemies like White émigrés from the Russian Civil War, at his exile in Turkey from February 1929 to July 1933, in France from July 1933 to June 1935, and in Norway from June 1935 to December 1936. Diego Rivera and Frida Kahlo were successful in persuading the Lázaro Cárdenas government to give the Trotskys political asylum in Mexico, and Trotsky and Sedova arrived in Mexico in January 1937.

From January 1937 to April 1939, the couple lived at Frida Kahlo's family home called “La Casa Azul” (The Blue House), which is located in the Coyoacán borough of Mexico City. However, by 1939, Diego Rivera and Leon Trotsky had a falling-out. Some stories state that it was over ideology and Diego's criticism of Trotsky's writing and others state that Trotsky had had an affair with Frida, or a combination of both. The Trotskys then moved to the house on Viena Street in the same district in April 1939, not far from The Blue House. Trotsky's grandson, Esteban Volkov, also lived with Trotsky and Sedova at the Viena Street house from August 1939 to August 1940.

=== Assassination ===
While Mexico had an active Communist movement at that time, like elsewhere it was divided between those who supported Stalin and those who opposed him. On 24 May 1940, a failed attempt on Trotsky's life was led by NKVD agent Iosif Grigulevich and Mexican painter David Alfaro Siqueiros. The group were disguised as police officers and managed to overpower guards, set up machine guns in the house's inner courtyard and began firing at the various rooms of the small house. Those inside survived by hiding under bedroom furniture. Trotsky's grandson was wounded in the foot. Robert Sheldon Harte, a young assistant and bodyguard of Trotsky, was abducted and later murdered, but the other guards defeated the attackers. This attack prompted the building of the walls that surround the property and the building of guard towers, which gives the property a fortress-like appearance.

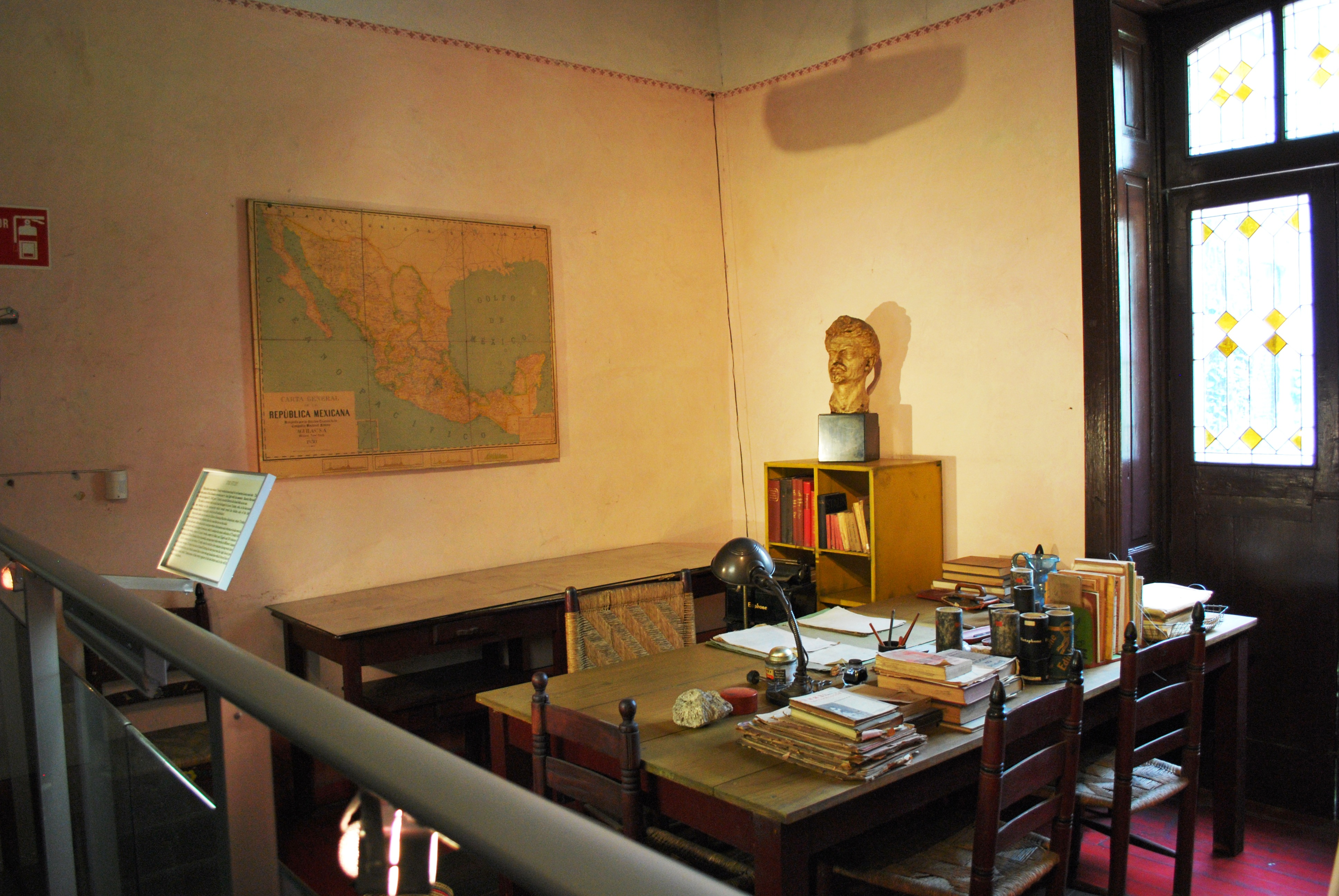
Study where Trotsky was murdered.

The next attempt on Trotsky's life, on 20 August 1940, was successful. A Spanish Stalin supporter by the name of Ramón Mercader, under the name of Jacson Mornard and with a Canadian passport, had become the lover of Trotsky's personal secretary, who was a Soviet agent. As such, he gained the household's trust and was permitted on the premises. On that day, Mercader asked Trotsky to look over something he had written, and as Trotsky read the work, Mercader removed an alpine climbing axe from his coat and struck Trotsky in the back of the skull. The blow to Trotsky's head was bungled and failed to kill Trotsky instantly, as Mercader had intended. Witnesses stated that Trotsky spat on Mercader and began struggling fiercely with him, which resulted in Mercader's hand being broken. Hearing the commotion, Trotsky's bodyguards burst into the room and nearly killed Mercader, but Trotsky stopped them, laboriously stating that the assassin should be made to answer questions. Trotsky was taken to a hospital, operated on, and survived for more than a day before he died on 21 August 1940, as a result of loss of blood and shock.

Mercader was arrested by Mexican police, convicted of murder and spent twenty years in a Mexican prison. When he was released in 1960, Mercader reportedly fled to Prague, then Moscow, where he received the Order of Lenin. According to some later reports, he would die of cancer in Havana.

The room in which Trotsky was killed remains exactly as it was at that moment, including the papers and the books in their exact positions.

== The museum ==
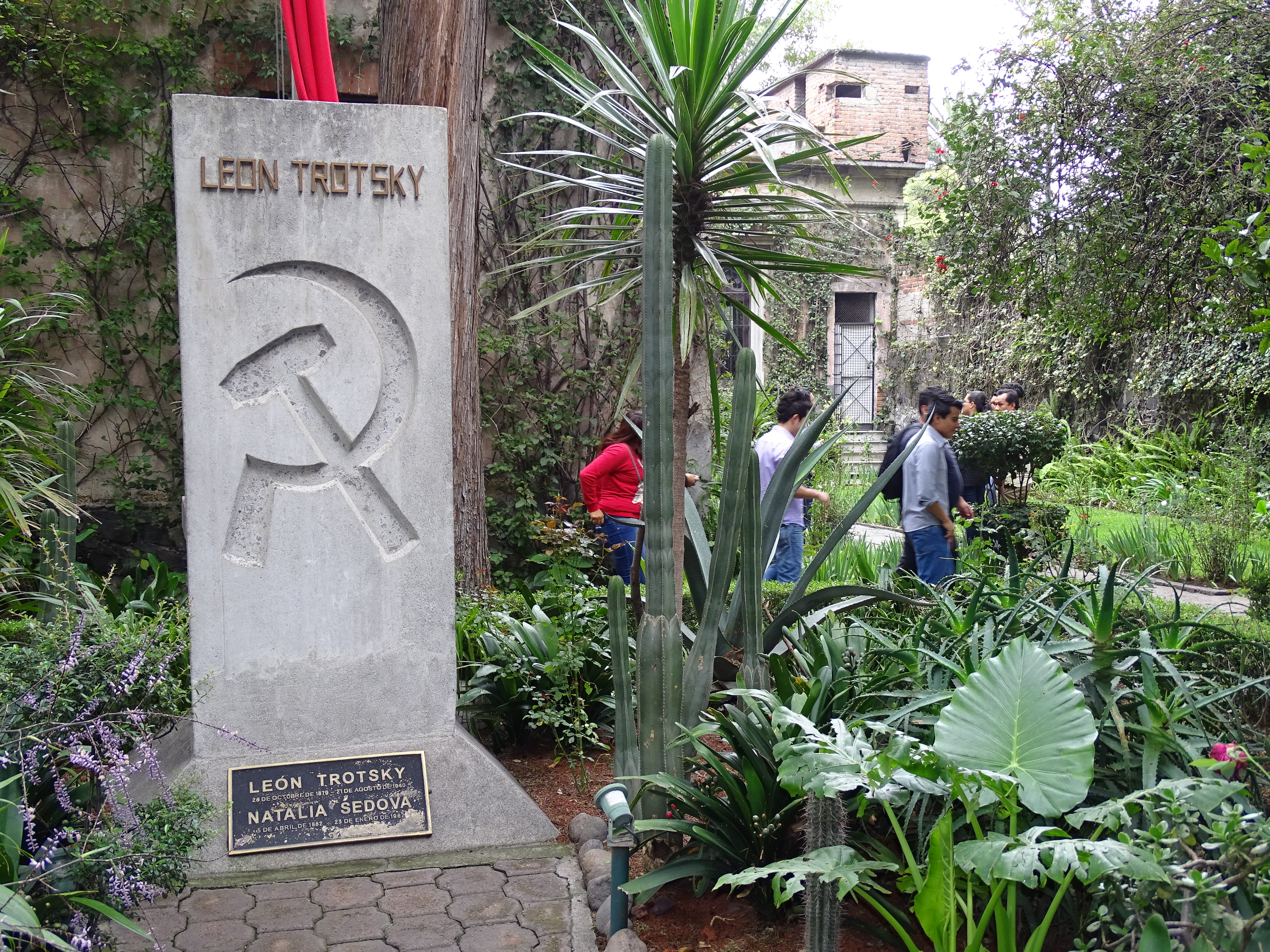
Trotsky's grave, designed by Juan O'Gorman, and surrounding gardens.

The current museum was created on 20 August 1990, to commemorate the 50th anniversary of the assassination along with the Instituto del Derecho de Asilo y las Libertades Públicas (Institute for the Right of Asylum and Public Liberties). The latter was created to help other political dissidents seeking asylum in Mexico, but it was consolidated with the museum in 1996. The official name of the organization is now the Instituto del Derecho de Asilo - Museo Casa de León Trotsky. The museum receives an average of 17,000 foreign visitors each year, along with 50,000 students from visits organized by the Secretariat of Public Education. The museum is supported only by ticket sales and donations. There is occasional support by the city government such as the renovation of the guard tower.

There is also a gift shop and cafe and it is open Tuesday through Sunday, 10am – 5pm.

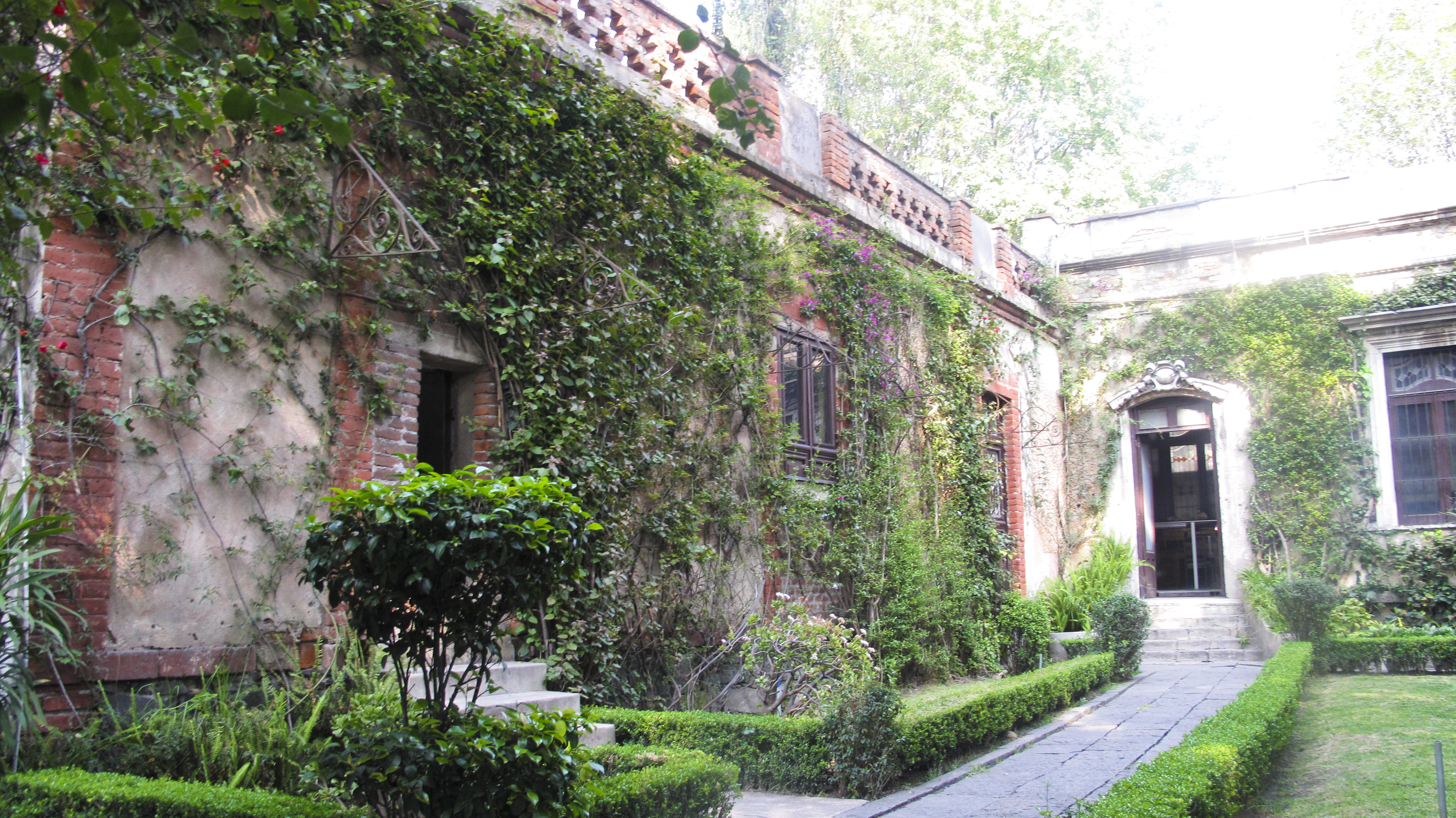
Back side of the house.

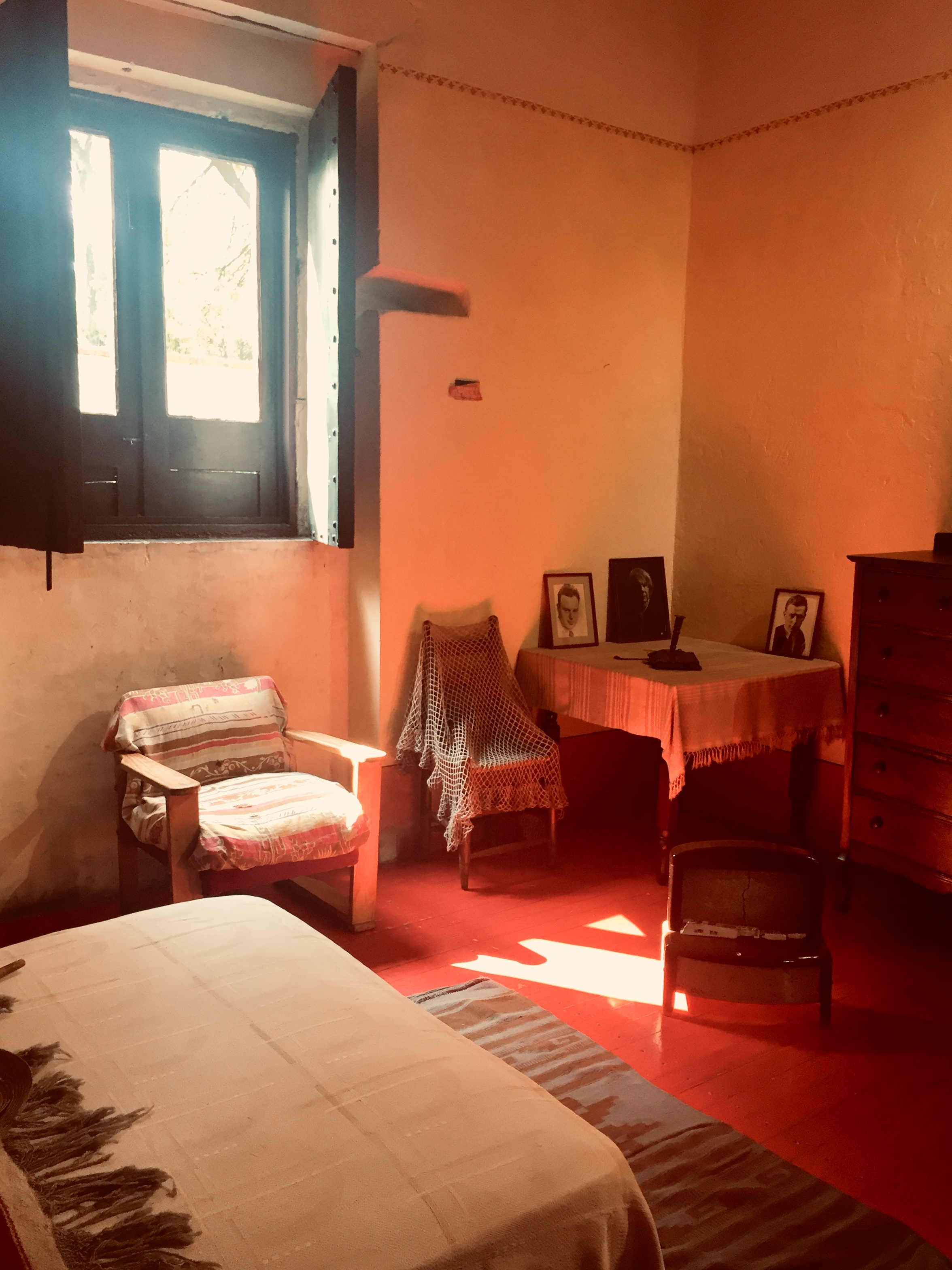
A bedroom in the house.

=== House ===
The museum consists of the house that Trotsky lived in, the garden area and the outer walls with guard facilities, located in a quiet, residential neighborhood next to an arroyo that ran parallel to the Churubusco River. La Jornada newspaper called the atmosphere of the place “real, tense, not with abundance and not always happy.” The complex was declared a historic monument in 1982. The house is small and common for a dwelling built in the early 20th century in the area. One notable exception is a tower topped by a bronze eagle of the type that Venustiano Carranza used during the Mexican Revolution. It is claimed that it was a gift from Carranza to the house's former owner, a Mister Turatti. Bullet holes from the Siqueiros attack are still on the outer walls. The interior of the house has been kept as it was when Trotsky lived there: the kitchen has its pots and pans, shoes are lined alongside beds, with floors and beds covered by Mexican textiles. There are some bullet holes in the interior as well. The center of the house is Trotsky's study were everything from his glasses, to papers, to books and more are left exactly as they were when Trotsky was attacked.

=== Garden ===
The rest of the complex space is taken up by the garden area, which is still maintained with tropical flowers and other plants, such as rare cacti, which Trotsky collected. There are photos in the museum of Trotsky collecting cacti in the Mexican countryside and tending the garden along with the rabbits and chickens which were in the hutches and coops that still exist. The center of the garden contain a stone stele designed by Juan O’Gorman, which contains Trotsky's ashes along with those of his wife. Above the stele is a flagpole with the Soviet flag.

=== Guards quarters ===
Along the high outer walls and watchtowers are guard houses and other facilities that have been turned into exhibit halls and other facilities associated with the museum. These rooms display photographs, newspapers more personal effects of Trotsky and more. As a museum, some other buildings were added along the walls which contain photos from Trotsky's lifetime, biographical notes in Spanish and memorabilia such as Trotsky trademark small round glasses. The guards’ house contains a permanent photographic collection containing images of Trotsky's family, his participation in the Bolshevik Revolution and his family tree. In what were once guest quarters at the end of the garden, hang dozens of black-and-white photos of Trotsky and Natalia accompanied by celebrity friends, such as Diego Rivera and Frida Kahlo.

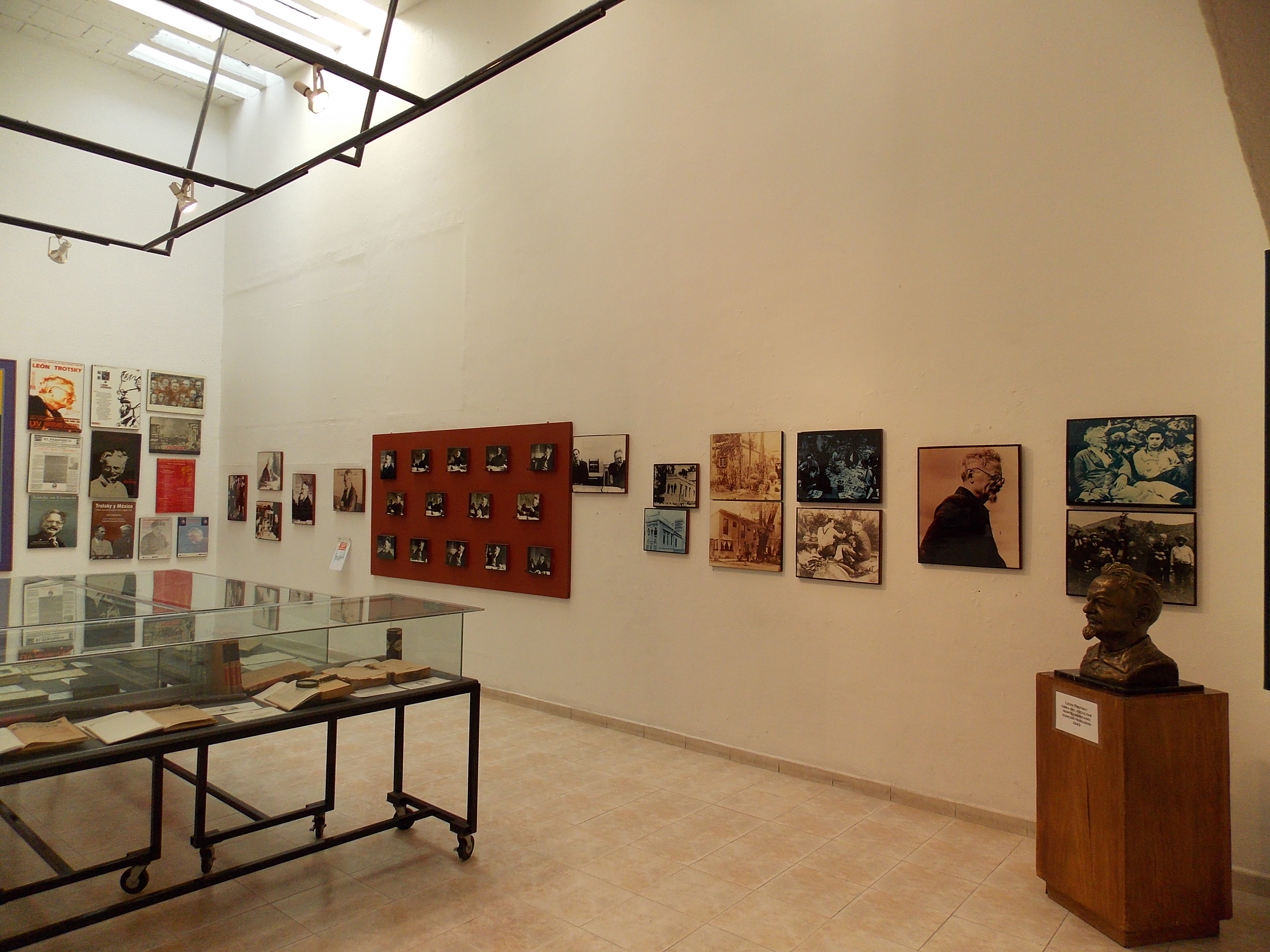
Exhibition gallery.

=== Permanent exhibit hall ===
This contains "a photographic collection that shows Trotsky's family, his participation in the Bolshevik revolution and his family's genealogical tree" As well as personal items, and displays of contextual historical information.

=== Temporary exhibit halls ===
There is also an art gallery, which has rotating short term contemporary art exhibitions, installations, and performances by different artists, and sometimes documentary or archival shows. These art shows include works by graffiti artists and tattoo artists. Events have been attended by officials from the city's Public Security agency, the borough of Coyoacán, technical schools and even the Cuban embassy.

=== Auditorium and library ===
The auditorium seats eighty and the Rafael Galván library has a collection of over 6,000 volumes mostly on the social sciences, economics and politics.

== See also ==
- Leon Trotsky: A Revolutionary's Life by Joshua Rubenstein (2011).
- The Prophet: The Life of Leon Trotsky (3 vols.) by Isaac Deutscher (1954–1963).
- Trotsky: A Biography by Robert Service (2009).
