= Audie Awards =

Audiobook award

- Awarded for: Distinction in audiobooks and spoken-word entertainment
- Sponsored by: Audio Publishers Association
- Location: New York City, New York
- Country: United States
- Established: 1996
- Website: audiopub.org/audie-awards

The Audie Awards (/ˈɔːdi/ AW-dee, rhymes with "gaudy"; abbreviated from audiobook), or simply the Audies, are awards for achievement in spoken word, particularly audiobook narration and audiodrama performance, published in the United States of America. They are presented by the Audio Publishers Association (APA) annually in March.

The Audies are sometimes likened to the Academy Awards for their public recognition of merit in the audio industry. In order to win, works must be submitted for nomination. A panel of judges considers candidates based on consumer acceptance, sales performance, and marketing, and winners and finalists are chosen based on narration, production quality, and source content; formerly packaging was also evaluated.

== Awards ==
The Audio Publishers' Association currently awards 25 awards, listed below.

Audiobook of the Year

- Audie Award for Audiobook of the Year

Narration

- Audie Award for Audio Drama
- Audie Award for Fiction Narrator
- Audie Award for Narration by the Author
- Audie Award for Nonfiction Narrator
- Audie Award for Multi-Voiced Performance

General

- Audie Award for Autobiography or Memoir
- Audie Award for Business and Personal Development
- Audie Award for Faith-Based Fiction and Nonfiction
- Audie Award for Erotica
- Audie Award for Fantasy
- Audie Award for Fiction
- Audie Award for History or Biography
- Audie Award for Horror
- Audie Award for Humor
- Audie Award for Literary Fiction & Classics
- Audie Award for Middle Grade Title
- Audie Award for Mystery
- Audie Award for Nonfiction
- Audie Award for Original Work
- Audie Award for Romance
- Audie Award for Science Fiction
- Audie Award for Short Stories or Collection
- Audie Award for Spanish Language Title
- Audie Award for Thriller or Suspense
- Audie Award for Young Adult Title
- Audie Award for Young Listeners' Title

Numerous other awards have been discontinued or merged since the Audies' inception in 1996.

=== Special awards ===
==== Special Achievement ====
Year	Recipient	Role	Ref.
2001	Paul Rush	Founder of Earful of Books	
2001	Duvall and Siegrid Hecht	Founders of Books on Tape	
2001	Barbara Holdridge and Marianne Mantell	Founders of Caedmon	
2001	Jenny Frost	President of Random House Audio	
2005	Timothy Ditlow and Helen Ditlow	Founders of Listening Library	
2007	Don Katz	CEO and Founder of Audible	
2008	Linda Olsen and Grady Hesters	President and CEO of Audio Editions	
2009	Michael Snodgrass and Eileen Hutton	Brilliance Audio	
2012	Craig Black	Founder and CEO of Blackstone Audio	
2013	Bob and Debra Deyan	Co-founders of Deyan Audio	
2013	Fifty Shades of Grey, written by E. L. James and narrated by Becca Battoe (Random House Audio)		
2014	George Guidall	Actor & Narrator	
2015	Edward Herrmann	Actor & Narrator	

==== Special Industry Achievement ====
Year	Recipient	Role	Ref.
2023	Richard Rieman	Founder and CEO of Imagination Storybooks	
2023	Amber Beard and Kelly Gildea	Penguin Random House audio producers	

==== Judge's Award ====
Year	Category	Title	Author(s)	Narrator(s)	Publisher	Ref.
2005	Language Learning	Instant Immersion: Hawaiian	Kaliko Beamer-Trapp and Kiele Akana Gooch	Kaliko Beamer-Trapp and Kiele Akana Gooch	Topics Entertainment	
2005	Language Learning	Pimsleur French Level 1	Pimsleur	Ray Brown	Simon & Schuster Audio	
2005	Language Learning	New Basic French	Berlitz Publishing	Full cast	Langenscheidt Publishing Group	
2006	Spanish Language	El Codigo Da Vinci	Dan Brown	Raul Amundaray	FonoLibro Inc.	
2006	Spanish Language	Cuando era Puetorriqueña	Esmeralda Santiago	Esmeralda Santiago	Recorded Books	
2006	Spanish Language	Don Quijote de la Mancha	Miguel de Cervantes	Full cast	Yo Yo Libros	
2006	Spanish Language	La Casa en Mango Street	Sandra Cisneros	Liliana Valenzuela	Random House Audio	
2006	Spanish Language	La Vida Secreta de las Abejas	Sue Monk Kidd	Cristina Arsuaga	HighBridge Audio	
2007	Politics	Hubris: The Inside Story of Spin, Scandal, and the Selling of the Iraq War	Michael Isikoff and David Corn	Stefan Rudnicki	Blackstone Audio	
2007	Politics	Faith and Politics	Senator John Danforth	Senator John Danforth	Listen & Live Audio, Inc.	
2007	Politics	In Time of War	Pierce O'Donnell	Raymond Todd	Blackstone Audio	
2007	Politics	The One Percent Doctrine	Ron Suskind	Ed Herrmann	Simon & Schuster Audio	
2007	Politics	Wake Up Call	Kristin Breitweiser	Kristin Breitweiser	Hachette Audio	
2009	Politics	Hot, Flat, and Crowded	Thomas L. Friedman	Oliver Wyman	Macmillan Audio	
2009	Politics	Descent into Chaos	Ahmed Rashid	Arthur Morey	Brilliance Audio	
2009	Politics	Mike's Election Guide	Michael Moore	Michael Moore	Hachette Audio	
2009	Politics	The War Within (2008)	Bob Woodward	Boyd Gaines	Simon & Schuster Audio	
2009	Politics	The Way of the World	Ron Suskind	Alan Sklar	HarperAudio	
2011	Paranormal	Beautiful Creatures	Kami Garcia and Margaret Stohl	Kevin T. Collins	Hachette Audio	
2011	Paranormal	Skinwalker	Faith Hunter	Khristine Hvam	Audible, Inc.	
2011	Paranormal	So Cold the River	Michael Koryta	Robert Petkoff	Hachette Audio	
2011	Paranormal	The Girl on Legare Street	Karen White	Aimee Bruneau	Listen & Live Audio	
2011	Paranormal	Bayou Moon	Ilona Andrews	Renee Raudman	Tantor Media	
2015	Science & Technology	The Second Machine Age	Erik Brynjolfsson and Andrew McAfee	Jeff Cummings	Brilliance Publishing	
2015	Science & Technology	The Copernicus Complex	Caleb Scharf	Caleb Scharf	Macmillan Audio	
2015	Science & Technology	The Marshmallow Test	Walter Mischel	Alan Alda	Brilliance Publishing	
2015	Science & Technology	A Primate's Memoir	Robert M. Sapolsky	Mike Chamberlain	Tantor Media	
2015	Science & Technology	When Google Met Wikileaks	Julian Assange	Tom Pile	Audible, Inc.	

=== Hall of Fame ===
Year	Title	Author(s)	Narrator(s)	Ref.
2006	The Harry Potter Audiobook Series	J. K. Rowling	Jim Dale	
2008	The Secret	Rhonda Byrne	Rhonda Byrne	

== Audie Awards galas ==
The Audie Awards gala is the annual awards ceremony during which most of the Audie Awards are presented. It is hosted by the Audio Publishers Association and features a guest master of ceremonies (emcee), usually a notable figure in the world of audiobook narration or a celebrity audiobook enthusiast.

Initially the Audies were handed out during a casual afternoon hosted by an industry insider. […] Now it's a formal evening, with cocktails beforehand and Champagne and dessert afterward.

The Audiobook of the Year award was not presented before 2004.

#	Date	Audiobook of the Year	Master of Ceremonies	Venue
1st	June 14, 1996	—N/a	—N/a	Hyatt Regency Chicago; Chicago, Illinois
2nd	May 29, 1997	—N/a	—N/a	McCormick Place Center; Chicago, Illinois
3rd	May 30, 1998	—N/a	—N/a	McCormick Place Center; Chicago, Illinois
4th	April 30, 1999	—N/a	—N/a	Regal Biltmore Hotel; Los Angeles, California
5th	June 2, 2000	—N/a	—N/a	Chicago Field Museum; Chicago, Illinois
6th	June 1, 2001	—N/a	Martin Jarvis and Rosalind Ayres	Art Institute of Chicago; Chicago, Illinois
7th	May 3, 2002	—N/a	Dylan and Becky Ann Baker	United Nations Building; New York, New York
8th	May 31, 2003	—N/a	Marsha Mason	Petersen Automotive Museum; Los Angeles, California
9th	June 4, 2004	Harry Potter and the Order of the Phoenix (narr. Jim Dale)	Unknown	Winter Garden Room; Chicago, Illinois
10th	June 3, 2005	My Life (narr. Bill Clinton)	Neil Gaiman	Tavern on the Green; New York, New York
11th	May 19, 2006	The Hitchhiker's Guide to the Galaxy: Tertiary Phase (narr. Simon Jones and full cast)	Grover Gardner	National Press Club; Washington, D.C.
12th	June 1, 2007	Inspired by... The Bible Experience: New Testament (narr. Angela Bassett and full cast)	Jim Dale	Rainbow Room; New York, New York
13th	May 30, 2008	The Chopin Manuscript: A Serial Thriller (narr. Alfred Molina)	Scott Brick	Millennium Biltmore Hotel; Los Angeles, California
14th	May 29, 2009	The Graveyard Book (narr. Neil Gaiman)	Tony Roberts	New-York Historical Society; New York, New York
15th	May 25, 2010	Nelson Mandela's Favorite African Folktales (narr. Samuel L. Jackson and full cast)	Gary Dell'Abate	Museum of the City of New York; New York, New York
16th	May 24, 2011	Life (narr. Johnny Depp and Joe Hurley)	Adriana Trigiani	The Times Center; New York, New York
17th	June 5, 2012	Bossypants (narr. Tina Fey)	Michael Showalter	New-York Historical Society; New York, New York
18th	May 30, 2013	The End of the Affair (narr. Colin Firth)	Daniel Handler	New-York Historical Society; New York, New York
19th	May 29, 2014	Still Foolin' 'Em: Where I've Been, Where I'm Going, and Where the Hell Are My Keys? (narr. Billy Crystal)	Libba Bray	New York Academy of Medicine; New York, New York
20th	May 28, 2015	Mandela: An Audio History (narr. Desmond Tutu, Nelson Mandela, and Joe Richman)	Jack Gantos	New York Academy of Medicine; New York, New York
21st	May 11, 2016	The Girl on the Train (narr. Clare Corbett, Louise Brealey, and India Fisher)	Paula Poundstone	Adler Planetarium; Chicago, Illinois
22nd	June 1, 2017	Hamilton: The Revolution (narr. Mariska Hargitay, Lin-Manuel Miranda, and Jeremy Carter)	Paula Poundstone	French Institute Alliance Française; New York, New York
23rd	May 31, 2018	Lincoln in the Bardo (narr. Nick Offerman and full cast)	Simon Vance	New-York Historical Society; New York, New York
24th	March 3, 2019	Children of Blood and Bone (narr. Bahni Turpin)	Tan France	Guastavino's; New York, New York
25th	March 2, 2020	The Only Plane in the Sky: An Oral History of 9/11 (narr. Holter Graham and full cast)	Mo Rocca	Guastavino's; New York, New York
26th	March 22, 2021	Piranesi (narr. Chiwetel Ejiofor)	John Leguizamo	virtual (due to the COVID-19 pandemic)
27th	March 4, 2022	Project Hail Mary (narr. Ray Porter)	Kal Penn	virtual (due to the COVID-19 pandemic)
28th	March 28, 2023	Finding Me (narr. Viola Davis)	Michelle Buteau	Pier Sixty; New York, New York
29th	March 4, 2024	Surrender (narr. Bono)	Nia Vardalos	The Avalon; Los Angeles, California
30th	March 4, 2025	My Name Is Barbra (narr. Barbra Streisand)	Michele Cobb	Pier Sixty; New York, New York
31st	March 2, 2026	Sunrise on the Reaping (narr. Jefferson White)	Sean McManus	Pier Sixty; New York, New York
