= Zina (film) =

- DVD cover
- Directed by: Ken McMullen
- Written by: Terry James; Ken McMullen
- Produced by: Ken McMullen
- Starring: Domiziana Giordano; Ian McKellen
- Cinematography: Bryan Loftus
- Edited by: Robert Hargreaves
- Music by: David Cunningham (industrial music); Barrie Guard (symphonic music); Simon Heyworth (additional music)
- Distributed by: Virgin Films
- Release date: July 1985
- Running time: 90 minutes
- Country: United Kingdom
- Language: English

Zina (also known as Zina and the Ogre) is a 1985 British film directed by Ken McMullen and starring Domiziana Giordano, Ian McKellen and Philip Madoc. It was written by Terry James and McMullen and tells the story of a twentieth century Antigone, Zinaida Volkova daughter of Leon Trotsky.

== Plot ==
In 1930s Berlin, Zina is being treated by the Adlerian psychotherapist Professor Arthur Kronfeld. During the psychoanalysis, which includes hypnosis, she recalls incidents both from her own life and that of her father, as a leader of the Russian Revolution, as the holder of state power and later in exile. Against the background of the progressive deterioration of the situation in Europe, threatened by the rise of fascism and the spectre of the Second World War, Zina's identification with Antigone becomes more and more credible. What were her hallucinations begin to take objective form on the streets. The dynamics of Greek tragedy, always waiting in the wings, step forward to take control.

== Cast ==
- Domiziana Giordano as Zina Bronstein
- Ian McKellen as Professor Kronfeld
- Philip Madoc as Trotsky
- Rom Anderson as Maria
- Micha Bergese as Molanov
- Dominique Pinon as Pierre
- Gabrielle Dellal as stenographer
- William Hootkins as Walter Adams
- Leonie Mellinger as German stenographer
- Paul Geoffrey as Lyova
- Tusse Silberg as Jeanne
- Maureen O'Brien as Natalya
- George Yiasoumi as André Breton
- George Levantis as Kharalambus
- Jeffrey Teare as Stalin's agent in art gallery
- Eleanor Greet as Stalin's agent in art gallery

== Reception ==
Time Out wrote: "This revisits the twin 20th century traumas of Revolution and Reich, as witnessed by the self-styled 'good-for-nothing daughter of the most important man of our time', namely Leon Trotsky. 1932 finds him in Turkey rallying forces against Stalin and Hitler, while she, both victim and visionary, lies on a couch in Berlin, where McKellen's neo-Freudian shrink sees her morbid insanity as mirroring a Germany in thrall to Thanatos. Is there more than a coincidental (anagrammatic?) link between Zina's and the Nazis' different madnesses? McMullen isn't entirely convincing, but his elegantly prowling camera, careful compositions, and astute use of locations ranging from Berlin and Blackpool to Lanzarote, create a powerful, onerous mood with much more assurance than the otherwise similar 1919; and the wild and woolly Giordano, emotions scudding across her face like clouds, is simply magnificent as the volatile Zina."

Barbara Kruger wrote in Artforum: "In Zina, McMullen engages a threefold agenda. First, he characterizes Bronstein as a tormented analysand, a stunning misfit who plays bag lady in art galleries and at family get-togethers. Sliding toward suicide, she struggles with the demons that people the empty space left by her father’s exile from his family and his homeland. Second, McMullen has researched Trotsky’s writings, Bronstein’s letters, and Isaac Deutscher’s three-part biography of Trotsky – The Prophet Armed (1954), The Prophet Unarmed (1959), and The Prophet Outcast (1963) – in order to set the scene both historically and politically for his life and banishment. Establishing this procedure early on, Zina’s precredit sequence sports a list of events that historically grounds the film and positions its narrative enravelment. McMullen’s third approach is to parallel this narrative with the pattern of classic tragedy, the conventional “battle between instinct and reason” riff. ... And although the film takes on the gloss of multiple shufflings and displacements, this “look” is just another stylistic appropriation obscuring McMullen’s uncritical investment in the power of master genres, master discourses, and masterpieces. Perhaps thankfully, rather than remaining content with dry avant-garde illustrations of theory, he juices up his cinematic items with continental philosopher kings and glamorous female movie stars, even adding more than a dollop of contempo feminist and psychoanalytic concerns."

== Accolades ==
The film won the Special Prize of the Jury at the 1986 San Sebastian International Film Festival.

It also won four prizes at the Fantasporto film festival.

It won the 1986 KNF award at the International Film Festival Rotterdam.
