= My Life (Trotsky) =

Autobiography of Leon Trotsky

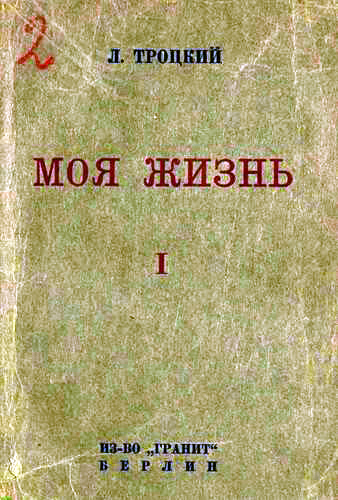
- First edition cover of the first volume
- Author: Leon Trotsky
- Original title: Моя Жизнь
- Genre: Autobiography
- Publisher: Charles Scribner's Sons
- English publication date: 1930
- OCLC: 5721995

My Life: An Attempt at an Autobiography (Russian: Моя Жизнь, romanized: Moya Zhizn') is the name of the Russian revolutionary Communist leader Leon Trotsky's autobiography. The book was first published in 1930 and was written in the first year of Trotsky's exile in Turkey. It covers the time from his youth, through the Revolution of 1905, the Revolution of 1917, the Russian Civil War up to his struggle against Stalinism and eventual expulsion from the Communist Party.

The Russian/Soviet historian Dmitri Volkogonov claims that Trotsky's "My Life, must hold pride of place as a work of remarkable self-analysis, as well as imaginative history. Although he wrote it at the relatively early age of forty-eight, soon after his deportation, his life up to then had been eventful enough to merit recording."

Before he settled with the simple title My Life, Trotsky tried out several titles:

- Half A Century (1879 - 1929)
- An Experiment in Autobiography
- Flood Tides and Ebb Tides: The Autobiography of a Revolutionary
- In the Service of the Revolution: An Experiment in Autobiography
- A Life of Struggle: The Autobiography of a Revolutionary
- To Live is to Struggle: The Autobiography of a Revolutionary

== See also ==
- Leon Trotsky: A Revolutionary's Life by Joshua Rubenstein (2011).
- The Prophet: The Life of Leon Trotsky by Isaac Deutscher (1954–1963).
- Trotsky: A Biography by Robert Service (2009).
- List of books by Leon Trotsky
