= The Prophet Armed: Trotsky, 1879–1921 =

1954 biography of Leon Trotsky by Isaac Deutscher

- Book cover
- Author: Isaac Deutscher
- Audio read by: Nigel Patterson
- Language: English
- Series: The Prophet: The Life of Leon Trotsky
- Subject: Russian Revolution, Leon Trotsky, Soviet Union, Communism, Joseph Stalin
- Genre: Non-fiction, Biography, History, Politics
- Publisher: Oxford University Press (original editions)
- Publication date: 1954
- Publication place: United Kingdom
- Media type: Print (Hardcover, Paperback), Kindle, (Note: The Kindle edition from Verso Books published in 2015 is of the unabridged three volume set, 2055pp.) Audiobook. (Note: The audiobook edition from Tantor Media published in 2025 is of the unabridged three volume set, and is narrated by Nigel Patterson, (Running time: 62:43:00).)
- Pages: 540 (first edition)
- ISBN: 978-0195001464
- OCLC: 2571311
- Followed by: The Prophet Unarmed: Trotsky, 1921–1929

The Prophet Armed: Trotsky, 1879–1921 is the first in a three volume biography of Leon Trotsky (Lev Davidovich Bronstein (Note: Russian: Лев "Лейба" Давидович Бронштейн, romanized: Lev "Leyba" Davidovich Bronshteyn, IPA: [lʲef lʲɪjbə dɐˈvʲidəvʲɪtɕ brɐnʂˈtʲejn], /ˈtrɒtski/; Russian: Лев Давидович Троцкий, romanized: Lev Davidovich Trotskiy, IPA: [ˈlʲef ˈtrotskʲɪj]; Ukrainian: Лев Давидович Троцький; also transliterated Lyev, Trotski, Trockij and Trotzky)) (7 November [O.S. 26 October] 1879 – 21 August 1940) by the Polish-British historian Isaac Deutscher. It was first published in 1954 by Oxford University Press.

== Synopsis and structure ==
Volume one chronicles the life of Leon Trotsky from 1879 to 1921. (Note: The titles The Prophet Armed and The Prophet Unarmed reference a quote from Niccolò Machiavelli, "Hence it comes that all armed Prophets have been victorious, and all unarmed Prophets have been destroyed." (Niccolò Machiavelli, The Prince, Chapter 6).) The book examines his early engagement in revolutionary movements, his involvement in the 1905 Revolution, and his developing relationship with Vladimir Lenin and the Bolsheviks. It further details his significant role in the 1917 October Revolution and his leadership in establishing the Red Army during the Russian Civil War. The narrative outlines Trotsky's abilities as a speaker and organizer, and his dedication to the revolutionary objectives of the era.

Chapters:

- Preface – The scope and significance of Trotsky's life and work.
1. Home and School – Explores Trotsky's early life in Yanovka, his family background, and initial education, highlighting formative influences that shaped his worldview.
2. In Search of an Ideal – Details Trotsky's exposure to revolutionary ideas during his schooling in Odessa and Nikolayev, leading to his early political activism.
3. At the Door of History – Covers Trotsky's arrest, exile to Siberia, and eventual escape, marking his deeper involvement in revolutionary movements.
4. An Intellectual Partnership – Examines Trotsky's collaboration and ideological interactions with other Marxist thinkers, including his complex relationship with Lenin.
5. Trotsky in 1905 – Focuses on Trotsky's prominent role in the 1905 Russian Revolution, particularly his leadership within the St. Petersburg Soviet.
6. "Permanent Revolution" – Introduces Trotsky's theory of permanent revolution, outlining its development and distinguishing it from other Marxist doctrines.
7. The Doldrums: 1907–1914 – Discusses the period of political reaction and Trotsky's activities in exile, including his journalistic work and efforts to unify socialist factions.
8. War and the International – Analyzes Trotsky's stance on World War I, his anti-war writings, and his involvement with international socialist movements.
9. Trotsky in the October Revolution – Details Trotsky's critical participation in the 1917 Bolshevik Revolution, including his organizational and leadership roles.
10. The People's Commissar – Describes Trotsky's tenure as People's Commissar for Foreign Affairs and his role in negotiating the Treaty of Brest-Litovsk.
11. The Drama of Brest-Litovsk – Explores the contentious peace negotiations with Germany and the internal debates within the Bolshevik leadership.
12. Arming the Republic – Covers Trotsky's efforts in building and leading the Red Army during the Russian Civil War, emphasizing military strategies and challenges.
13. Revolution and Conquest – Examines the consolidation of Bolshevik power and the expansion of revolutionary ideals amidst ongoing conflicts.
14. Defeat in Victory – Reflects on the paradoxes of Bolshevik success, including emerging bureaucratic tendencies and ideological compromises.
15. Postscript: Victory in Defeat – Provides a concluding analysis of Trotsky's position in the early Soviet state and the seeds of future political struggles.
- Note on Trotsky's military writings.

The next volume in the series is The Prophet Unarmed: Trotsky, 1921–1929.

== Reception and academic reviews ==
- James Burnham (1955). "Review of The Prophet Armed: Trotsky, 1879-1921 by Trotsky and Isaac Deutscher". The Russian Review. 14 (2). Wiley: 151–152. doi:10.2307/125574. JSTOR 125574.
- H. Carrêre d'Encausse (1963). "Review of Trotsky, 1879-1921: Le prophète armé by Isaac Deutscher et al" [Review of Trotsky, 1879-1921: The Armed Prophet by Isaac Deutscher et al.]. Revue française de science politique (in French). 13 (4). Sciences Po University Press: 1056–1059. JSTOR 43117559.
- Jane Degras (1954). "Review of The Prophet Armed: Trotsky: 1879-1921 by I. Deutscher". Soviet Studies. 6 (1). Taylor & Francis, Ltd.: 53–56. JSTOR 148940.
- John Fitzsimons (1954). "Review of The Prophet Armed: Trotsky 1879-1921 by Isaac Deutscher". Blackfriars. 35 (410). Wiley: 228–229. doi:10.1017/S1754201400022657. JSTOR 43814577.
- Leo Gruliow (1954). "Review of The Prophet Armed: Trotsky, 1879-1921 by Isaac Deutscher". Political Science Quarterly. 69 (4). Wiley: 627–629. doi:10.2307/2145651. JSTOR 2145651.
- Paul L. Horecky (1954). "Review of The Prophet Armed: Trotsky, 1879-1921 by Isaac Deutscher". The Journal of Politics. 16 (4). University of Chicago Press: 754–758. doi:10.2307/2126579. JSTOR 2126579.
- Gay Humphrey (1954). "Review of The Prophet Armed: Trotsky, 1879-1921 by Isaac Deutscher". Journal of International Affairs. 8 (2). Temporary Publisher: 226. JSTOR 24355363.
- Ramesh Narain Mathur (1956). "Review of The Prophet Armed: Trotsky, 1879-1921 by I. Deutscher". India Quarterly. 12 (1). Sage Publications, Ltd.: 83–85. JSTOR 45068024.
- W. E. Mosse (1956). "Review of The Prophet Armed: Trotsky, 1879-1921 by Isaac Deutscher". History. 41 (141/143). Wiley: 268–269. JSTOR 24402987.
- Albert Parry (1954). "Review of The Prophet Armed: Trotsky, 1879-1921 by Isaac Deutscher". The American Slavic and East European Review. 13 (4). Cambridge University Press: 597–599. doi:10.2307/2491625. JSTOR 2491625.
- K. S. P. (1955). "Review of The Prophet Armed: Trotsky, 1879-1921 by Isaac Deutscher". Jewish Social Studies. 17 (1). Indiana University Press: 87. JSTOR 4465319.
- Oliver Henry Radkey (1954). "Review of The Prophet Armed: Trotsky, 1879-1921 by Isaac Deutscher". The American Historical Review. 60 (1). Oxford University Press: 105–107. doi:10.2307/1842787. JSTOR 1842787.
- Geo. W. Simpson (1955). "Review of The Prophet Armed: Trotsky, 1879-1921 by Isaac Deutscher". International Journal. 10 (2). Sage Publications, Ltd.: 139–140. JSTOR 40198117.
- I. Stone (1954). "Review of The Prophet Armed: Trotsky, 1879-1921 by Isaac Deutscher". The Western Political Quarterly. 7 (3). Sage Publications, Inc.: 496–497. JSTOR 442775.
- Robert Warth (1956). "Review of The Prophet Armed: Trotsky, 1879-1921 by Issac Deutscher". The Journal of Modern History. 28 (2). University of Chicago Press: 189–190. doi:10.1086/237898. JSTOR 1872551.
- Bertram D. Wolfe (1954). "Review of The Prophet Armed: Trotsky, 1879-1921 by Isaac Deutscher". The Annals of the American Academy of Political and Social Science. 294. Sage Publications, Inc.: 222. JSTOR 1029326.
- H. P. (1954). "Epitaph für einen Sieger" [Epitaph for a Victor]. Ost-Probleme (in German). 6 (32). Berliner Wissenschafts-Verlag: 1302–1304. JSTOR 44924374.
- Oskar Anweiler (1956). "Review of Trotsky, 1879-1921: Der bewaffnete Prophet by Isaac Deutscher et al". Osteuropa. 6 (5). Berliner Wissenschafts-Verlag: 436–438. JSTOR 44899554.
- "Review of The Prophet Armed: Trotsky, 1879-1921 by Isaac Deutscher". The American Scholar. 23 (3). The Phi Beta Kappa Society: 368–370. 1954. JSTOR 41207847.
- "Review of The Prophet Armed: Trotsky, 1879-1921 by Isaac Deutscher". Current History. 26 (152). University of California Press: 254. 1954. JSTOR 45308635.
- "Review of The Prophet Armed: Trotsky, 1879-1921 by Isaac Deutscher". Military Affairs. 19 (3): 158–159. 1955. doi:10.2307/1982722. JSTOR 1982722.
- C. G. (1954). "Review of The Prophet Armed: Trotsky, 1879-1921 by Isaac Deutscher". International Affairs. 30 (4). Royal Institute of International Affairs: 488–489. doi:10.2307/2608750. JSTOR 2608750.

== Release information ==
- Hardcover: 1954 (First Edition), Oxford University Press, 540 pp.
- Paperback: 2004, Verso Books, 564 pp.
- Kindle: 2004, Verso Books.
- Audiobook: 2025, Tantor Media, narrated by Nigel Patterson, duration: 22:00:00.

== Series overview ==
The Prophet is a three-volume biography of Russian revolutionary Leon Trotsky by the Polish-British historian Isaac Deutscher. The series traces Trotsky's life from his early revolutionary activities to his eventual assassination in exile. Widely read and influential, (Note: See the Reception and academic reviews section of each volume.) the trilogy presents a sympathetic but critical account of Trotsky's political development and historical significance.

== Similar or related works ==
- Trotsky: A Biography by Robert Service (2009).
- Trotsky by Tony Cliff (1989–1993, 4 vols.).
- Leon Trotsky: A Revolutionary's Life by Joshua Rubenstein (2011).

== About the author ==
Isaac Deutscher (Polish: Izaak Deutscher; 3 April 1907 – 19 August 1967) was a Polish Marxist writer, journalist and political activist who moved to the United Kingdom before the outbreak of World War II. He is best known as a biographer of Leon Trotsky and Joseph Stalin and as a commentator on Soviet affairs.

== See also ==
- Russian Revolution
- Marxist historiography
- Trotskyism
- Bibliography of the Russian Revolution and Civil War § Leon Trotsky
- Leon Trotsky bibliography
