= The Prophet Unarmed: Trotsky, 1921–1929 =

1959 biography of Leon Trotsky by Isaac Deutscher

- Author: Isaac Deutscher
- Audio read by: Nigel Patterson
- Language: English
- Series: The Prophet: The Life of Leon Trotsky
- Subject: Russian Revolution, Leon Trotsky, Soviet Union, Communism, Joseph Stalin
- Genre: Non-fiction, Biography, History, Politics
- Publisher: Oxford University Press (original editions)
- Publication date: 1959 (first edition)
- Publication place: United Kingdom
- Media type: Print (Hardcover, Paperback), Kindle, (Note: The Kindle edition from Verso Books published in 2015 is of the unabridged three volume set, 2055pp.) Audiobook. (Note: The audiobook edition from Tantor Media published in 2025 is of the unabridged three volume set, and is narrated by Nigel Patterson, (Running time: 62:43:00).)
- ISBN: 978-0195010947
- OCLC: 1175403
- Preceded by: The Prophet Armed: Trotsky, 1879–1921
- Followed by: The Prophet Outcast: Trotsky, 1929–1940

The Prophet Unarmed: Trotsky, 1921–1929 is the second in a three volume biography of Leon Trotsky (Lev Davidovich Bronstein (Note: Russian: Лев "Лейба" Давидович Бронштейн, romanized: Lev "Leyba" Davidovich Bronshteyn, IPA: [lʲef lʲɪjbə dɐˈvʲidəvʲɪtɕ brɐnʂˈtʲejn], /ˈtrɒtski/; Russian: Лев Давидович Троцкий, romanized: Lev Davidovich Trotskiy, IPA: [ˈlʲef ˈtrotskʲɪj]; Ukrainian: Лев Давидович Троцький; also transliterated Lyev, Trotski, Trockij and Trotzky)) (7 November [O.S. 26 October] 1879 – 21 August 1940) by the Polish-British historian Isaac Deutscher. It was first published in 1959 by Oxford University Press.

== Synopsis and structure ==
Volume two examines the life of Leon Trotsky during the period following the Russian Civil War, from 1921 to 1929. (Note: The titles The Prophet Armed and The Prophet Unarmed reference a quote from Niccolò Machiavelli, "Hence it comes that all armed Prophets have been victorious, and all unarmed Prophets have been destroyed." (Niccolò Machiavelli, The Prince, Chapter 6).) The book explores Trotsky's evolving role within the Soviet Union, his intellectual contributions during this time, and the growing political conflicts he faced, including the rise of Joseph Stalin. It details the debates within the Communist Party of the Soviet Union, Trotsky's perspectives on the direction of the revolution, and the increasing marginalization of his influence. The narrative outlines his continued efforts as a writer and theorist amidst a changing political landscape.

Chapters:

- Preface – The scope and significance of Trotsky's life and work.
1. The Power and the Dream – Examines Trotsky's position in the Soviet leadership following Lenin's death, highlighting his vision for the revolution and the challenges he faced.
2. The Anathema – Details the growing opposition to Trotsky within the Communist Party, leading to his political isolation and the denunciations he endured.
3. "Not by Politics Alone..." – Explores Trotsky's intellectual pursuits, including his writings on literature and culture, during a period of political marginalization.
4. An Interval – Covers a period of relative inactivity in Trotsky's political life, focusing on his reflections and analyses of the Soviet state's direction.
5. The Decisive Contest: 1926–7 – Chronicles the critical power struggle between Trotsky and Stalin, culminating in Trotsky's expulsion from the Communist Party.
6. A Year at Alma Ata – Describes Trotsky's internal exile in Alma Ata, detailing his continued writings and the circumstances leading to his eventual deportation from the USSR.
7. Bibliography – Provides a list of sources and references used throughout the volume.

The preceding volume in the series is The Prophet Armed: Trotsky, 1879–1921; the next volume in the series is The Prophet Outcast: Trotsky, 1929–1940.

== Reception and academic reviews ==
- Christopher Hill (1960). "Review of The Prophet Unarmed: Trotsky 1921-1929 by Isaac Deutscher". Soviet Studies. 11 (3). Taylor & Francis, Ltd.: 317–323.
- Samuel H. Baron (1960). "Review of The Prophet Unarmed: Trotsky, 1921-1929 by Isaac Deutscher". The Journal of Politics. 22 (2). University of Chicago Press: 359–361.
- Derry Novak (1962). "Review of The Prophet Unarmed: Trotsky 1921-1929 by Isaac Deutscher". The Canadian Journal of Economics and Political Science. 28 (3). Canadian Economics Association: 449–450.
- Bertram D. Wolfe (1960). "Review of The Prophet Unarmed: Trotsky, 1921-1929 by Isaac Deutscher". The Annals of the American Academy of Political and Social Science. 327. Sage Publications, Inc.: 177–178.
- J. L. H. Keep (1961). "Review of The Prophet Unarmed: Trotsky 1921-1929 by Isaac Deutscher". The English Historical Review. 76 (301). Oxford University Press: 756–757.
- Richard Pipes (1960). "Review of The Prophet Unarmed: Trotsky, 1921-1929 by Isaac Deutscher". The American Historical Review. 65 (4). Oxford University Press: 904–905.
- C. G. (1960). "Review of The Prophet Unarmed: Trotsky, 1921-1929 by Isaac Deutscher". International Affairs. 36 (2). Royal Institute of International Affairs: 225–226.
- Leonard Schapiro (1960). "Review of The Prophet Unarmed: Trotsky, 1921-1929 by Isaac Deutscher". Political Science Quarterly. 75 (3). Wiley: 429–431.
- R. N. Mathur (1960). "Review of The Prophet Unarmed: Trotsky, 1921-1929 by Issac Deutscher". India Quarterly. 16 (3). Sage Publications, Ltd.: 273–275.
- H. Gordon Skilling (1960). "Review of The Prophet Unarmed: Trotsky, 1921-1929 by Isaac Deutscher". International Journal. 15 (2). Sage Publications, Ltd.: 158–160.
- Donald W. Treadgold (1960). "Review of The Prophet Unarmed: Trotsky, 1921-1929 by Isaac Deutscher". The Journal of Modern History. 32 (4). University of Chicago Press: 413–415.
- Adam B. Ulam (1960). "Review of The Prophet Unarmed: Trotsky, 1921-1929 by Isaac Deutscher". The Russian Review. 19 (3). Wiley: 287–289.
- Heinz Brahm (1961). "Review of Der entwaffnete Prophet. Trotzki 1921-1929 by Isaac Deutscher" [Review of The Unarmed Prophet. Trotsky 1921-1929 by Isaac Deutscher]. Historische Zeitschrift (in German). 192 (2). Oldenbourg Wissenschaftsverlag GmbH: 438–440.
- Stuart R. Tompkins (1960). "Review of The Prophet Unarmed: Trotsky 1921-1929 by Isaac Deutscher". The Slavonic and East European Review. 39 (92). Modern Humanities Research Association: 267–268.
- "Review of The Prophet Unarmed: Trotsky, 1921-1929 by Isaac Deutscher". Current History. 38 (222). University of California Press: 110. 1960.
- J. F. Reynolds (1960). "Review of The Prophet Unarmed. Trotsky: 1921-1929 by Isaac Deutscher". Studies: An Irish Quarterly Review. 49 (193). Irish Province of the Society of Jesus: 98–101.

== Release information ==
- Hardcover: December 31, 1959 (First Edition), Oxford University Press, 508 pp.
- Paperback: January 2004, Verso Books, 464 pp.
- Kindle: 2004, Verso Books.
- Audiobook: 2025, Tantor Media, narrated by Nigel Patterson, duration: 22:00:00.

== Series overview ==
The Prophet is a three-volume biography of Russian revolutionary Leon Trotsky by the Polish-British historian Isaac Deutscher. The series traces Trotsky's life from his early revolutionary activities to his eventual assassination in exile. Widely read and influential, (Note: See the Reception and academic reviews section of each volume.) the trilogy presents a sympathetic but critical account of Trotsky's political development and historical significance.

== Similar or related works ==
- Trotsky: A Biography by Robert Service (2009).
- Trotsky by Tony Cliff (1989–1993, 4 vols.).
- Leon Trotsky: A Revolutionary's Life by Joshua Rubenstein (2011).

== About the author ==
Isaac Deutscher (Polish: Izaak Deutscher; 3 April 1907 – 19 August 1967) was a Polish Marxist writer, journalist and political activist who moved to the United Kingdom before the outbreak of World War II. He is best known as a biographer of Leon Trotsky and Joseph Stalin and as a commentator on Soviet affairs.

== See also ==
- Russian Revolution
- Marxist historiography
- Trotskyism
- Bibliography of the Russian Revolution and Civil War § Leon Trotsky
- Leon Trotsky bibliography
