= The Prophet Outcast: Trotsky, 1929–1940 =

1963 biography of Leon Trotsky by Isaac Deutscher

- Book cover
- Author: Isaac Deutscher
- Audio read by: Nigel Patterson
- Language: English
- Series: The Prophet: The Life of Leon Trotsky
- Subject: Russian Revolution, Leon Trotsky, Soviet Union, Communism, Joseph Stalin
- Genre: Non-fiction, Biography, History, Politics
- Publisher: Oxford University Press (original editions)
- Publication date: 1963
- Publication place: United Kingdom
- Media type: Print (Hardcover, Paperback), Kindle, (Note: The Kindle edition from Verso Books published in 2015 is of the unabridged three volume set, 2055pp.) Audiobook. (Note: The audiobook edition from Tantor Media published in 2025 is of the unabridged three volume set, and is narrated by Nigel Patterson, (Running time: 62:43:00).)
- ISBN: 978-0192810663
- OCLC: 204952
- Preceded by: The Prophet Unarmed: Trotsky, 1921–1929

The Prophet Outcast: Trotsky, 1929–1940 is the third in a three volume biography of Leon Trotsky (Lev Davidovich Bronstein (Note: Russian: Лев "Лейба" Давидович Бронштейн, romanized: Lev "Leyba" Davidovich Bronshteyn, IPA: [lʲef lʲɪjbə dɐˈvʲidəvʲɪtɕ brɐnʂˈtʲejn], /ˈtrɒtski/; Russian: Лев Давидович Троцкий, romanized: Lev Davidovich Trotskiy, IPA: [ˈlʲef ˈtrotskʲɪj]; Ukrainian: Лев Давидович Троцький; also transliterated Lyev, Trotski, Trockij and Trotzky)) (7 November [O.S. 26 October] 1879 – 21 August 1940) by the Polish-British historian Isaac Deutscher. It was first published in 1963 by Oxford University Press.

== Synopsis and structure ==
Volume three chronicles the final years of Leon Trotsky's life, from his exile in 1929 until his assassination in 1940. The book details Trotsky's forced departure from the Soviet Union, his efforts to continue his political work and critique of Joseph Stalin from abroad, and the formation of the Fourth International. It examines his writings, his personal life in exile, and the increasing threats he faced from Stalin's regime, ultimately culminating in his death. The narrative portrays Trotsky's unwavering commitment to his political beliefs despite facing isolation and danger.

Chapters:

- Preface – The scope and significance of Trotsky's life and work.
1. On the Princes’ Isles – Covers Trotsky's initial exile on Prinkipo Island, detailing his reflections on the Soviet Union's direction and his efforts to maintain political influence from abroad.
2. Reason and Unreason – Examines Trotsky's ideological battles against Stalinist policies, highlighting his critiques of the Soviet regime and the challenges he faced in rallying opposition.
3. The Revolutionary as Historian – Focuses on Trotsky's work as a historian, particularly his writings on the Russian Revolution, and how he used history to support his political arguments.
4. "Enemy of the People" – Details the increasing vilification of Trotsky by the Soviet government, portraying him as a traitor and consolidating Stalin's power through propaganda.
5. The "Hell-Black Night" – Describes the period of the Great Purge, during which many of Trotsky's allies were executed, and the profound personal and political losses he endured.
6. Postscript: Victory in Defeat – Reflects on Trotsky's legacy, considering how his ideas persisted despite his assassination and the suppression of his followers.
- Bibliography – Provides a list of sources and references used throughout the volume.

Volume three is the final volume in the trilogy; the preceding volume is The Prophet Unarmed: Trotsky, 1921–1929.

== Reception and academic reviews ==
- Richard A. Pierce (1965). "Review of The Prophet Outcast: Trotsky, 1929-1940 by Isaac Deutscher". International Journal. 20 (2). Sage Publications, Ltd.: 268–269. JSTOR 40199539.
- Alfred J. Rieber (1965). "Review of The Prophet Outcast: Trotsky, 1929-1940 by Isaac Deutscher". The Journal of Modern History. 37 (1). University of Chicago Press: 118–119. JSTOR 1874618.
- Stuart R. Tompkins (1964). "Review of The Prophet Outcast: Trotsky, 1929-1940 by I. Deutscher". The Slavonic and East European Review. 43 (100). Modern Humanities Research Association: 230–232. JSTOR 4205635.
- Violet Conolly (1964). "Review of The Prophet Outcast: Trotsky, 1929-1940 by Isaac Deutscher". International Affairs. 40 (2). Royal Institute of International Affairs: 324–326. JSTOR 2609946.
- MICHAEL FUTRELL (1964). "Review of The Prophet Outcast: Trotsky, 1929-1940 by Isaac Deutscher". History. 49 (165). Wiley: 107–108. JSTOR 24404599.
- Louis Fischer (1964). "Trotsky, Stalin, and Deutscher". The Virginia Quarterly Review. 40 (2). University of Virginia: 307–313. JSTOR 26444873.
- E. B. (1964). "Review of The Prophet Outcast: Trotsky, 1929-1940 by Isaac Deutscher". Il Politico. 29 (2). Rubbettino Editore: 534–535. JSTOR 43209311.
- "Review of The Prophet Outcast: Trotsky, 1929-1940 by Isaac Deutscher". Current History. 46 (271). University of California Press: 175. 1964. JSTOR 45311075.
- William Petersen (1964). "Review of The Prophet Outcast: Trotsky, 1929-1940 by Isaac Deutscher". The Annals of the American Academy of Political and Social Science. 354. Sage Publications, Inc.: 204–205. JSTOR 1035377.
- Theodore H. Von Laue (1964). "Review of The Prophet Outcast: Trotsky, 1929-1940 by Isaac Deutscher". The American Historical Review. 70 (1). Oxford University Press: 160–162. JSTOR 1842151.
- H. Gordon Skilling (1964). "Review of The Prophet Outcast: Trotsky, 1929-1940 by Isaac Deutscher". The Canadian Journal of Economics and Political Science. 30 (3). Canadian Economics Association: 472–474. JSTOR 139728.

== Release information ==
- Hardcover: January 1, 1963 (First Edition), Oxford University Press, 543 pp.
- Paperback: January 2004, Verso Books, 512 pp.
- Kindle: 2004, Verso Books.
- Audiobook: 2025, Tantor Media, narrated by Nigel Patterson, duration: 22:00:00.

== Series overview ==
The Prophet is a three-volume biography of Russian revolutionary Leon Trotsky by the Polish-British historian Isaac Deutscher. The series traces Trotsky's life from his early revolutionary activities to his eventual assassination in exile. Widely read and influential, (Note: See the Reception and academic reviews section of each volume.) the trilogy presents a sympathetic but critical account of Trotsky's political development and historical significance.

== Similar or related works ==
- Trotsky: A Biography by Robert Service (2009).
- Trotsky by Tony Cliff (1989–1993, 4 vols.).
- Leon Trotsky: A Revolutionary's Life by Joshua Rubenstein (2011).

== About the author ==
Isaac Deutscher (Polish: Izaak Deutscher; 3 April 1907 – 19 August 1967) was a Polish Marxist writer, journalist and political activist who moved to the United Kingdom before the outbreak of World War II. He is best known as a biographer of Leon Trotsky and Joseph Stalin and as a commentator on Soviet affairs.

== See also ==
- Russian Revolution
- Marxist historiography
- Trotskyism
- Bibliography of the Russian Revolution and Civil War § Leon Trotsky
- Leon Trotsky bibliography
