= First exile of Trotsky =

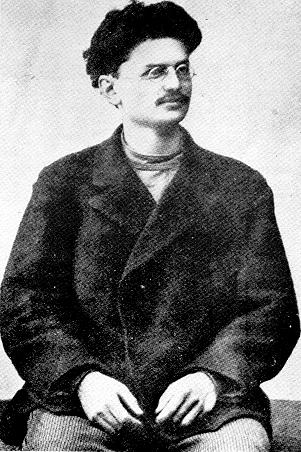
Leon Trotsky in Siberia (1900)

The first exile of Trotsky was a two-year period in the life of revolutionary Leon Trotsky, that he spent in exile in the Irkutsk Governorate of the Russian Empire. He was exiled by the verdict of the Odessa court for the organization of the South-Russian Workers Union. Being imprisoned and exiled from 1900 to 1902, Trotsky married and actively engaged in both self-education (which included reading the classics of Marxism) and journalistic work. Under the pseudonym "Antid Oto" Trotsky collaborated with the newspaper Vostochnoye obozreniye (Russian: Восточное обозрение, "The Eastern Review"), which published three dozen of his articles and essays, warmly accepted by the audience. During his first exile, the future Soviet People's Commissar was involved in literary studies, was writing about general issues of sociology and creativity, plus – about the themes of Siberian peasant life. Traveling between the villages of Ust-Kut, Nizhne-Ilimsk and the city of Verkholensk, Trotsky came into contact with many former and future revolutionary personalities, including Moisei Uritsky and Felix Dzerzhinsky.

The printed works of Trotsky, published even in Western Europe, as well as his public lectures in Irkutsk, attracted attention of the leaders of the Russian Social Democratic Labour Party (RSDLP) to the young revolutionary: he was escaped from the Siberian exile. As a result, Trotsky left his wife with two little daughters. After the escape, he first appeared in Vienna and then in London, where his first meeting with Vladimir Lenin – who had recently published his book "What Is To Be Done?" – took place. Historians of the 21st century believed that staying in Siberia and contacts with local revolutionaries were of great importance for shaping the political views of the future leader of the October Revolution – for "his political self-determination".

== History ==
The main source for the early period of Leon Trotsky's life, including his first exile in Eastern Siberia, is the autobiography of the revolutionary "My Life".

== Literature ==
- Агунов С. Trotsky in the Siberian exile (based on the State Archives of the Irkutsk region) = Троцкий в сибирской ссылке (по материалам Государственного архива Иркутской области) // Дипломатический ежегодник. — М.: Международные отношения, 1992. [in Russian]
- Иванов А. А. The first exile of Lev Trotsky = Первая ссылка Льва Троцкого // Клио. — 2013. — Вып. 9 (81). — С. 120–127. — ISSN 2070-9773. [in Russian]
- Иванов А. А. Lev Bronstein in his Siberian exile = Лев Бронштейн в сибирской ссылке // Сибирская ссылка. Вып. 1 (13) : сборник научных статей / Редкол.: Отв.ред. Н. Н. Щербаков; Предисл. Б. С. Шостакович. — Иркутск: Издательство Иркутского университета, 2000. — 246 с. — ISBN 5-932190-08-6. [in Russian]
- Переломова Ю. Господин «Антид Ото»: Лев Троцкий как корреспондент «Восточного обозрения» // Восточно-Сибирская правда : газета. — 2017. — 7 марта. [in Russian]
- Шапошников В. Н. Троцкий — сотрудник «Восточного обозрения» // Известия Сибирского отделения Академии Наук СССР. Серия: истории, филологии и философии. — 1989. — Вып. 3. — С. 65–71. — ISSN 0869-8651. [in Russian]
- Ярославский Ем. Л.Д. Троцкий – Антид Ото. (Литературная деятельность Л.Д. Троцкого в Сибирской газете «Восточное Обозрение» в 1900—1902 гг.) // Сибирские огни. — 1923. — No. 1—2. — С. 113–126. [in Russian]
- Фельштинский Ю., Чернявский Г. Первая ссылка и первая эмиграция // Лев Троцкий. Книга 1. Революционер. 1879—1917 гг. — М.: Центрполиграф, 2012. — 448 с. — ISBN 978-5-227-03783-1. [in Russian]
- Broué P. L'université de la prison et de l'exil // Trotsky. — Fayard, 1988. — 1105 p. — ISBN 9782213022123. [in French]
- Service R. Siberian Exile // Trotsky: A Biography. — Cambridge: Belknap Press / Harvard University Press, 2009. — 648 p. — ISBN 978-0674036154.
- Ranc J. Sibirien (1900–1902) // Trotzki und die Literaten: Literaturkritik eines Außenseiters / ed. J. B. Metzler, Stuttgart. — Springer, 1997. — 215 p. — ISBN 978-3-476-45178-1. — ISBN 978-3-476-04273-6. [in German]
- Riga L. Ethnonationalism, Assimilation, and the Social Worlds of the Jewish Bolsheviks in Fin de Siècle Tsarist Russia // Comparative Studies in Society and History. — 2006. — Vol. 48, iss. 4. — P. 762–797. — ISSN 1475-2999. — DOI:10.1017/S0010417506000296.
- Rowney D. K. Development of Trotsky's theory of revolution, 1898—1907 // Studies in Comparative Communism. — 1977. — Spring-Summer (vol. 10, iss. 1–2). — P. 18–33. — DOI:10.1016/s0039-3592(77)80072-0.
