= Audie Award for Erotica =

Audiobook award

The Audie Award for Erotica, established in 2023, is one of several Audie Awards presented annually by the Audio Publishers Association. It awards excellence in narration, production, and content for an erotic audiobook released in a given year.

== Winners and finalists ==
Audie Award for Erotica winners and finalists
Year	Audiobook	Author(s)	Narrator(s)	Audiobook Publisher	Result	Ref.
2023 27th	On the Hustle	Adriana Herrera	Sean Crisden and Frankie Corzo (as Lola James)	HarperAudio	Winner	
2023 27th	The Dark King	Gina L. Maxwell	Aiden Snow and Avery Reid	Recorded Books	Finalist	
2023 27th	The Demon's Pet	Domino Savage	Avery Reid	Blackstone Audio	Finalist	
2023 27th	Nights of Silk and Sapphire	Amber Jacobs	Anastasia Watley	Tantor Audio	Finalist	
2023 27th	Personal	Alexandria House	Jakobi Diem and Wesleigh Siobhan	Pink Cashmere Publishing	Finalist	
2023 27th	Temper Me	Alexandria House	Jakobi Diem and Adenrele Ojo	Simon & Schuster Audio	Finalist	
2024 29th	Anger Bang	Avery Flynn	Kirsten Leigh and Lance Greenfield	Recorded Books	Winner	
2024 29th	Soul Eater (Monstrous, Book 1)	Lily Mayne	Michael Lesley	Podium Audio	Finalist	
2024 29th	Goal	Alexandria House	Jakobi Diem and Nicole Small	Pink Cashmere Publishing	Finalist	
2024 29th	Sabbatical	Katrina Jackson	Mari and Oscar Reyes	Sea Port Press	Finalist	
2024 29th	Salt Kiss	Sierra Simone	Oscar Reyes	Sierra Simone and Lyric Audiobooks	Finalist	
2025 30th	The Heartbreaker	Marni Mann	Savannah Peachwood and Connor Crais	Dreamscape Media	Winner	
2025 30th	The Beta	Avanne Michaels	Blanca Frappier, Sean Crisden, and Jack Hill	Black Dog Publishing	Finalist	
2025 30th	Faking with Benefits	Lily Gold	Faye Adele, Shane East, and a full cast	Lyric Audiobooks	Finalist	
2025 30th	Hurt for Me	Heather Levy	Ava Lucas	Brilliance Publishing	Finalist	
2025 30th	Once You're Mine	Morgan Bridges	Amelia Hugh and Walker Williams	Podium Audio	Finalist	
2026 31st	American Queen	Sierra Simone	Sophie Eastlake, Teddy Hamilton, Rex Rhys, Shane East, and Valerie Azlynn	Audiobrary	Winner	
2026 31st	Axes and O's	Kayla Grosse	Stella Hunter, Stephen Dexter, and Grayson Owens	Forever	Finalist	
2026 31st	House of Rayne	Harley LaRoux	Allie Shae and Jaclyn Kelso	Podium Audio	Finalist	
2026 31st	The Secrets We Hide	Berlin Wick	Sean Masters and Branden Davis-Butler	Wick Publications	Finalist	
2026 31st	Torment: Part One	Dylan Page	Rylee Forrester	Brilliance Publishing	Finalist	
