= Domiziana Giordano =

Italian artist, actress, photographer and video artist

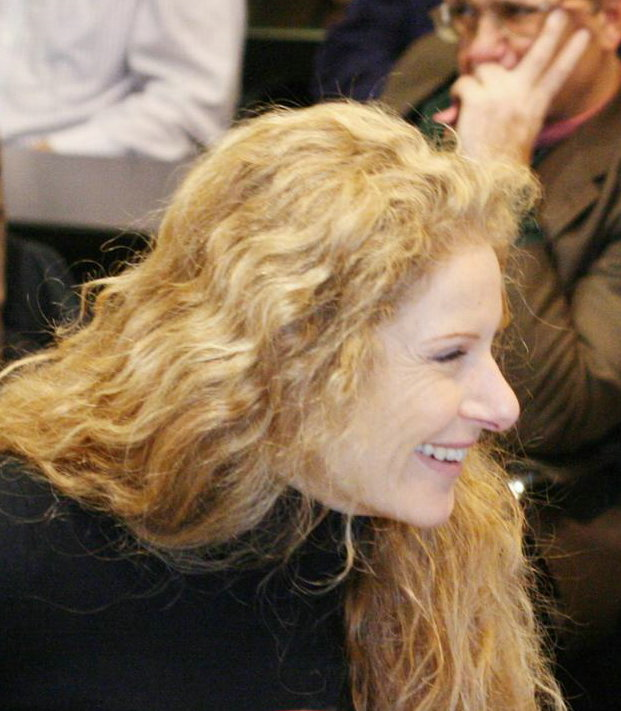
- Born: Domiziana Giordano; 4 September 1959 (age 67); Rome, Italy
- Occupations: Actress; photographer; video artist
- Years active: 1980–present

Domiziana Giordano (born 4 September 1959) is an Italian artist, actress, photographer, and video artist. Giordano has played roles in work directed by Mauro Bolognini, Jean-Luc Godard, Neil Jordan, Ken McMullen, Nicolas Roeg, and Andrei Tarkovsky, amongst others.

== Life and career ==
Born in Rome, Italy, in 1959, Giordano grew up in a family of artists and architects. Giordano studied architecture, but decided to dedicate herself full-time to the visual arts.

After completing her studies at the Accademia d'Arte Drammatica in Rome, Giordano furthered her education at the Stella Adler Studios for acting in New York City, as well as at the New York Film Academy for film directing. After her studies, she continued to work on visual arts and photography, beginning her career as an assistant director for stage and film.

Giordano first appeared on screen in Mario Monicelli's Amici Miei - Atto II in 1982. In 1983, she appeared as the female protagonist in Andrei Tarkovsky's Nostalghia. In 1986, Giordano won the International Fantasy Film Award at Fantasporto for her lead performance as the daughter of Leon Trotsky in Ken McMullen's film Zina (1985). Giordano also played roles in such films as Jean-Luc Godard's Nouvelle Vague (1990) and Neil Jordan's Interview with the Vampire (1994).

Besides her visual art work, she has also written poetry and articles about the history of the Art Critic that have been published in a very prestigious literary magazine in Italy. Her photographic work was nominated for the Rencontres Internationales de la Photographie de Arles in 2002. Giordano also collaborates with the online magazine Nova of the Italian newspaper Il Sole 24 Ore.

In 2006, she was a contestant in the fourth season of L'isola dei famosi.

== Filmography ==
- Amici Miei - Atto II (1982, directed by Mario Monicelli) - Noemi
- Nostalghia (1983, directed by Andrei Tarkovsky) - Eugenia
- Bakom Jalusin (1984, directed by Stig Björkman) - Helene Azar
- Zina (1985, directed by Ken McMullen) - Zina Bronstein
- Strana la Vita (1987, directed by Giuseppe Bertolucci) - Silvia
- Normality (1989, directed by Cecilia Miniucchi) - Lucia
- Nouvelle Vague (1990, directed by Jean-Luc Godard) - Elle: Elena Torlato-Favrini
- Eleonora Pimentel: The Jacobean Marquise (1990, TV Movie, directed by Ivana Massetti) - Eleonora Pimentel
- The Young Indiana Jones Chronicles ("Paris, October 1916," 1993, directed by Nicolas Roeg, written by George Lucas and Carrie Fisher) - Mata Hari
- Gioco Perverso (1993, TV Movie, directed by Italo Moscati) - Clara
- Interview with the Vampire (1994, directed by Neil Jordan) - Madeleine
- Mario und der Zauberer (1994, directed by Klaus Maria Brandauer) - Principessa
- La Famiglia Ricordi (1995, TV Miniseries, directed by Mauro Bolognini) - Teresa Stolz
- Machinations (1995, TV Movie, directed by Gerard Vergez) - Elisabeth Stadler
- Finalmente Soli (1997, directed by Umberto Marino) - Irene
- Canone Inverso - Making Love (2000, directed by Ricky Tognazzi) - Baroness Blau
- Il Quaderno della Spesa (2003, directed by Tonino Cervi) - Armida
