= Nouvelle Vague (1990 film) =

1990 film by Jean-Luc Godard

- Directed by: Jean-Luc Godard
- Written by: Jean-Luc Godard
- Produced by: Alain Sarde
- Starring: Alain Delon; Domiziana Giordano; Jacques Dacqmine; Christophe Odent
- Cinematography: William Lubtchansky
- Edited by: Jean-Luc Godard (uncredited)
- Distributed by: AMLF
- Release date: May 23, 1990 (France)
- Running time: 90 minutes
- Countries: France; Switzerland
- Language: French
- Box office: 140,356 admissions (France)

Nouvelle Vague (English: New Wave) is a 1990 French experimental film written and directed by Jean-Luc Godard. It follows the story of hitchhiker Lennox (Alain Delon) credited as Lui (He), taken in by a wealthy industrialist, Elena Torlato-Favrini or Elle (She), played by Domiziana Giordano. The film was entered into the 1990 Cannes Film Festival. It has (as of 2019) never been released on any home video format in North America, but the audio was issued as a 2CD set by ECM.

== Plot ==
La Contessa Elena Torlato-Favrini (her last name taken from The Barefoot Contessa) is a wealthy Italian industrialist living in a sprawling estate near Lake Geneva, Switzerland. She is attended by Jules the Gardener, his wife Yvonne, their daughter Cécile, the chauffeur Laurent, and the mysterious Della La Rue (or Della Street), a reference to Erle Stanley Gardner's Perry Mason stories). At the film's opening, Elena goes for a drive by herself and encounters Roger Lennox (his last name taken from The Long Goodbye), an apparent drifter. Elena's trajectory is brought to an abrupt halt as she stops to help Roger, who has evidently been forced off the road by a truck and is severely incapacitated. Roger offers Elena his hand, and Elena accepts his offer (the "miracle of empty hands" borrowed from Diary of a Country Priest). The series of exchanges constituting their relationship begins.

The narrative continues with Roger now Elena's kept man. He dotes on her and is obedient to her retinue that includes Elena's lawyer Raoul Dorfman, Raoul's girlfriend, the Doctor (one of Elena's shareholders) and the Doctor's wife Dorothy Parker, a writer like her namesake. After a series of episodes in which both members of the couple express dissatisfaction with the other and together ruminate on regret, Elena decides to take a motorboat across the lake to visit some friends. Roger obediently drives the boat and stops when Elena wants to get in the water, but refuses to join her, citing his inability to swim. In a mishap evocative of their first meeting, Roger falls into the water as Elena gets back into the boat. Elena watches him drown and does not help, appearing indifferent to his plight.

The servants and Raoul quickly attempt to cover up any existence of Roger but almost immediately there is a new crisis: a man identical to Roger, calling himself Richard Lennox and claiming to be Roger's brother, appears. He claims to know about the boating incident and is apparently using that as leverage to take over one of Elena's companies. While before the figure of Lennox was passive and docile, he is now shrewd and aggressive; it is Elena that now becomes pliant.

The power struggle reaches a climax in a recapitulation of the boating scene. Now it is Lennox who decides to take the boat out (this time a rowboat) and it is Elena who falls into the water, apparently unable to swim. Richard, at first as indifferent to Elena as she was to Roger Lennox in the same situation, abruptly takes Elena's hand and saves her. In the end, an equilibrium is reached. Elena realizes that Richard Lennox is the same man as Roger Lennox ("the same, but different"). Richard has taken on a controlling role in Elena's affairs, but Elena remains in charge. With renewed vigor, Elena warmly bids arrivederci to her servants (Richard having earlier arranged to sell the estate for a large sum of money) and Elena and Richard in turn drive away, apparently off to have more adventures as equals.

== Cast ==
- Alain Delon as Richard Lennox/Roger Lennox ("Lui")
- Domiziana Giordano as Elena Torlato-Favrini ("Elle")
- Jacques Dacqmine as the CEO
- Christophe Odent as Raoul Dorfman, the lawyer
- Roland Amstutz as Jules, the gardener
- Laurence Côte as Cécile
- Laurence Guerre as Della, la secrétaire
- Joseph Lisbona as Dr. Parker
- Laure Killing as Dorothy Parker, the doctor's wife
- Véronique Muller as Raoul's first girlfriend
- Maria Pitarresi as Raoul's second girlfriend
- Jacques Viallette as the factory director
- Brigitte Marvine as the journalist in the restaurant
- Cécile Reigher as a servant
- Pascal Sablier as the Iranian client
- Violaine Barret as the gardener's wife
- Steve Suissa as The waiter

== Music ==
- Paolo Conte : Blue Tango
- David Darling : Far Away Lights, Solo Cello, Clouds, Solo Cello And Voice
- Gabriella Ferri : A Zaza
- Paul Giger : Crossing
- Paul Hindemith : Mathis der Maler (Grablegung), Trauermusik, Mathis der Maler (Versuchung des heiligen Antonius), Sonate für Viola (1937), Sonate für Bratsche allein Op. 25/1
- Heinz Holliger : Trema für Violoncello solo
- Werner Pirchner : Kammer-Symphonie, Sonate vom rauen Leben, Do You Know Emperor Joe, Kleine Messe um „C" für den lieben Gott
- Dino Saluzzi : Winter, Transmutation, Andina
- Arnold Schoenberg : Verklärte Nacht
- Jean Schwartz : Charta Koa
- Patti Smith : Distant Fingers

== Discography ==
- 1997 : Jean-Luc Godard / Nouvelle vague (ECM NEW SERIES 1600/01 449 891-2, ECM Records, Munich), box including :
  - Portfolio with the track listing.
  - Booklet containing the essay Le Regard intérieur by Claire Bartoli, author and play-writer.
  - CD 1, 50 minutes
  - CD 2, 38 minutes

== Background ==
Most of the dialogue in the film consists of quotations from various sources, mostly literary. The chauffeur periodically asks the Lennox character "was you ever bit by a dead bee?" – a reference to the Bogart and Bacall film To Have and Have Not. Though Godard's previous films had been peppered with quotation and allusion, this is his first film where the dialogue is almost entirely quotation, a practice that he has continued in films such as Film Socialisme and Adieu au Langage. This is also the first film of many in which Godard takes the soundtrack music from the catalogue of ECM Records, whereas in the 80's he made extensive use of classical music. ECM has in turn released a complete soundtrack to the film from beginning to end, including the film's music, dialogue, and ambient sounds.

== Themes ==
Godard has said that the film is an allegory of the history of film. Elena represents the film industry. In the first half Lennox represents film and its makers that are taken in hand by the industry and nurtured but allowed to perish, or almost perish. Film is reborn in the figure of the French New Wave ("La Nouvelle Vague"), the filmmakers of which arrived armed with knowledge of the history of film but shrewd enough to manipulate the industry for their own ends, thus saving the industry from its own demise. Godard scholars like David Sterritt, Kaja Silverman, and Harun Farocki have identified other themes in the film.

== Reception ==
Vincent Canby, writing in a contemporaneous review in The New York Times, damned the film as little more than a "feature-length lipstick commercial," concluding that "only people who despise the great Godard films ... could be anything but saddened by this one." The reviewer's final pronouncement in a review that sealed the film's lack of success in the United States was "the party's over," apparently washing his hands of Godard's career as well as the film. However, the film was championed elsewhere and was hailed as one of the very best films of the year by such critics as J. Hoberman and Jonathan Rosenbaum. Canby's opinion has been disputed by later critics and scholars as well. In his book The Films of Jean-Luc Godard: Seeing the Invisible, David Sterritt devotes an entire chapter to the film, calling it a "complicated work" that has "especially strong links to Hail Mary and the other 'sublime' movies." Kaja Silverman and Harun Farocki likewise devote an entire chapter to the film in their Speaking About Godard. Based on 7 reviews, Nouvelle Vague has an approval rating of 71% on review aggregator Rotten Tomatoes.
