= Robert Sheldon Harte =

American communist

Robert Sheldon Harte (1915 – May 24, 1940) was an American Communist who worked as one of Leon Trotsky’s assistants and bodyguards in Coyoacán, Mexico. During the Stalinist attack against Trotsky’s household on May 24, 1940, Harte was abducted and later murdered by the Stalinist agents.

Harte was 25 years old when he offered his services as a guard to the Trotsky household. He replaced the American Trotskyist Alexander Buchman. He was described as popular and that although not an intellectual, he carried out any tasks without complaints.

== Murder ==
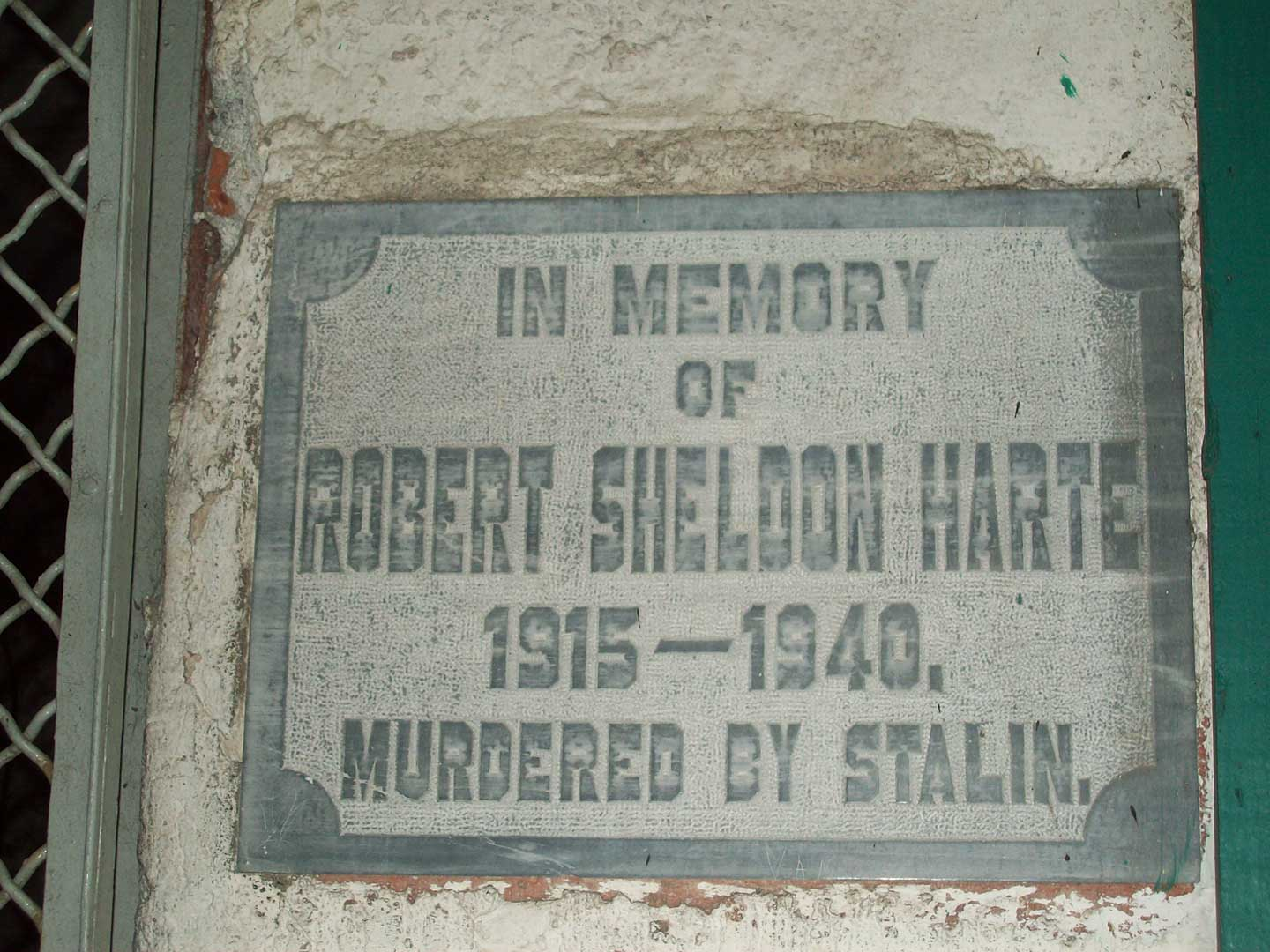
The plaque in memory of Robert Sheldon Harte, commissioned by Leon Trotsky, located at Casa Museo Leon Trotsky, Coyoacan, Mexico.

The abduction and murder of Harte was carried out by David Alfaro Siqueiros.

Trotsky had fled to Mexico as a result of several attempted assassination and kidnapping attempts by Soviet and Stalinist agents. On May 24, 1940, a group of Soviet and Mexican communists, including muralist David Siqueiros and Iosef Grigulevich, were able to gain access to Trotsky's compound. Harte had been guarding the entrance and there is some debate if Harte had let in this group or was not involved.

The group fired over seventy rounds into the house but failed to kill their target. Harte was missing and believed kidnapped. Harte's body was found a month later in a well, covered in lime. He had been shot in the head.

Trotsky commissioned a plaque and had it placed at the front of the house with the text: "In Memory of Robert Sheldon Harte, 1915–1940, Murdered by Stalin."

The Fourth International, the theoretical journal of the US Socialist Workers Party, published an article by Walter Rourke titled The Murder of Bob Harte, calling him the first American Trotskyist to fall victim to Stalin. An explanation provided for his murder was that he was able to identify Iosif Grigulevich, one of the attackers, in a previous assassination attempt against Trotsky. In the article Rourke notes that Trotsky wrote in the Mexican press that “The corpse of Bob Sheldon Harte is a tragic refutation of all the slanders and false denunciations made against him.” In his account of the attack Trotsky wrote that "if Sheldon Harte were an agent of the GPU he could have killed me at night and got away without setting in motion 20 people all of whom were subjected to a great risk."

== Soviet agent ==
It was purported, contrary to Trotsky's opinion, that Robert Sheldon Harte was indeed a Soviet agent operating under the name 'Amur' and was an accomplice in the May 24, 1940, attack on Trotsky. Harte was a member of the Communist Party of the USA recruited in New York by the NKVD. He was reportedly given a mission to liaise with a Mexican assassination squad led by Siqueiros. However, according to statements made by the man in charge of this GPU operation, General Leonid Eitingon on March 9, 1954, Harte was liquidated afterwards because he had expressed second thoughts. Eitingon said:

During the operation it was revealed that Sheldon was a traitor. Even though he opened the gate to the compound, once in the room there was found neither the archive, nor Trotsky himself. When the participants in the raid opened fire, Sheldon told them that, had he known all this, as an American he never would have agreed to participate in this raid. Such behavior served as the basis for deciding on the spot to liquidate him. He was killed by Mexicans.

To this day, however, Harte's true allegiance and death remain a mystery since neither have been resolved.

In the film The Assassination of Trotsky, he is portrayed under the name "Sheldon Harte."
