= Deyan Audio =

American audiobook producer

Deyan Audio was one of the world's largest independent producers of audiobooks, producing in excess of 12,000 titles. The company, was based in southern California, was founded in 1990 by Bob and Debra Deyan. Deyan Audio worked with the major publishers including Penguin Random House, HarperCollins, Hachette, Audible and others. They handled all aspects of production, including casting and directing. In 2014 the company created two additional businesses. The now defunct Game Changer Studios, for video game audio. And The Deyan Institute of Voice Artistry and Technology, an institute that offers(ed) top tier audiobook producers and audiobook performers online workshops.

== Branches ==
The company operates Game Changer Studios out of its Northridge location. Game Changer is a production studio specializing in ADR, video game production, interactive toy production, voiceover and dubbing. Game Changer clients include Weston Woods, LeapFrog, Mattel, Insatiable Press, Audible, etc.

The Deyan Institute for Voice Artistry and Technology, also operates out of the Northridge location. The Institute began offering classes in April 2014 in audiobook performance, direction, production, voiceover and editing.

== Corporate history ==
In September 2025 Deyan Audio stopped paying into SAG/AFTRA in contribution to the performers Union related to audiobook narration performers. In June 2026 the Debra Deyan, owner and one of the founders filed bankruptcy. Deyan Audio was started by Bob and Debra Deyan in their home in Van Nuys, California in 1990, producing their first recordings in a bedroom clothes closet that had good acoustics. The company grew and moved to a larger location in Tarzana California in 2007. They expanded again in 2013, adding their Northridge location. In a 2015 article in Publishers Weekly they were described as "legendary in audiobook circles". Bob died of complications from ALS in 2014.

== Awards ==
Deyan Audio has won four Grammy Awards and been nominated eleven times, in addition to numerous Audie Awards, ListenUp, Benjamin Franklin, and Earphone Awards.

Bob and Debra Deyan won the Lifetime Achievement Award in 2013 from the Audio Publishers Association, for their work in helping to pioneer the audiobook industry. They were the first individuals to receive the award, prior recipients were publishing houses.
