= Iosif Grigulevich =

Soviet secret police operative and assassin (1913–1988)

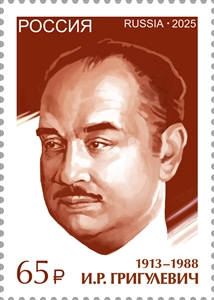
- Grigulevich on a 2025 stamp of Russia
- Born: Josifas Romualdovičius Grigulevičius; 5 May 1913; Vilnius, Vilna Governorate, Russian Empire (present-day Vilnius, Lithuania)
- Died: 2 June 1988 (aged 75); Moscow, Russian SFSR, USSR
- Other names: Grig, "MAKS", "ARTUR", "DAKS", Teodoro B. Castro, I. Lavretsky
- Occupations: Soviet spy, assassin, historian, biographer

Iosif Romualdovich Grigulevich (Russian: Иосиф Ромуальдович Григулевич; Lithuanian: Josifas Romualdovičius Grigulevičius; 5 May 1913 – 2 June 1988) was a Soviet secret police (NKVD) operative active between 1937 and 1953, when he played a role in assassination plots against Communist and Bolshevik individuals who were not loyal to Joseph Stalin. This included the murders of claimed and actual Trotskyists during the Spanish Civil War, most notably Andreu Nin, and an initial, unsuccessful assassination attempt against Leon Trotsky in Mexico City. Under an assumed identity as Teodoro B. Castro, a wealthy Costa Rican expatriate living in Rome, Grigulevich served as the ambassador of the Republic of Costa Rica to both Italy and Yugoslavia (1952–1954). He was tasked by the NKVD with the assassination of Yugoslav leader Josip Broz Tito, but the mission was aborted following Stalin's death in 1953.

Recalled to Moscow, Grigulevich retired from his career as a spy (the details of which would remain secret until after his death) and established himself as a professional historian. He was employed as a research fellow at the Institute of Ethnography of the Soviet Academy of Sciences and published many books and articles on the history of Latin America and on the modern Roman Catholic Church. In 1979 he was elected as a corresponding member of the Academy of Sciences. Writing under the pen-name I. Lavretsky (after his mother's maiden name) he published several bestselling biographies of Latin American revolutionaries, including Che Guevara.

== Early life ==
Iosif Grigulevich was born in Vilnius, in present day Lithuania, which was then part of the Pale of Settlement to which Jews were restricted within the Russian Empire. His father was a Karaite pharmacist and his mother a Russian-Jewish housewife. The Karaites are a very small ethnic group, originating in Crimea and characterized by their observance of a non-Rabbinical form of Judaism. Vilnius was then a cosmopolitan and multilingual city in which people communicated in Yiddish, Polish, Lithuanian, and Russian. Grigulevich also learned German at the local gymnasium, which, through the legacy of the Baltic Germans, was regarded as the language of the intelligentsia.

Vilnius was also the birthplace of the General Jewish Labour Bund and a hotbed of Jewish socialism. While still an adolescent, Grigulevich became involved with the Polish-Lithuanian Communist underground, which led to a two-year imprisonment and then to his exile from the Second Polish Republic. The sponsorship of two wealthy Karaite tobacco merchants, Eli and Abraham Lopato, allowed him to move to Paris. He spent ten months at the Sorbonne University, studying social sciences and becoming deeply involved with the Communist International (Comintern). Already fluent in German, he soon picked up English, Spanish, and French. In 1934, the Comintern sent him to Argentina, where his widowed father had settled, with instructions to join the local bureau of the International Red Aid and seek out operational opportunities on behalf of the Soviet secret services.

== Secret agent ==
=== Spain ===
In the late 1930s, Grigulevich was sent to Spain to monitor the activities of the Workers' Party of Marxist Unification (POUM, the militia with which George Orwell served), in the midst of the civil war in that country. Grigulevich worked under NKVD general Alexander Orlov, using the code names MAKS and FELIPE, and organized so-called "mobile groups" that killed, among other actual and suspected Trotskyists, POUM leader Andreu Nin. In this mission Grigulevich apparently collaborated with the assassin Vittorio Vidali, known in Spain as "Comandante Carlos Contreras."

To help justify the murder of Nin and the Stalinist campaign against the Trotskyites in Spain, Orlov instructed Grigulevich and a Spanish journalist to manufacture a dossier of "documentary evidence" of the collaboration of Nin and his associates with the nationalist forces of General Francisco Franco (which the Soviets identified as "fascists"). This false dossier, supposedly gathered by an fighter in the International Brigades named Max Rieger, was published in 1938 as Espionaje en España ("Espionage in Spain"). Grigulevich moved in literary and artistic circles in Barcelona and acted as interpreter for the visiting Soviet writers Mikhail Koltsov and Ilya Ehrenburg, as well as for the film director Roman Karmen, who had come to participate in the Congress of Writers in Defense of Culture, organized by the Comintern and Stalin's secret police. Shortly afterwards, Grigulevich was summoned back to Moscow.

=== Mexico ===
In January 1940, Grigulevich was sent to Mexico to take part in the first attempt on the life of Leon Trotsky, again working with Agent Vidali. Grigulevich's code name for this mission was "Yuzek." In the wee hours of 24 May 1940, a group of Stalinist agents, led by Grigulevich and David Alfaro Siqueiros, stormed Trotsky's compound at Coyoacán, near Mexico City. They missed Trotsky and his wife altogether and managed only to wound their young grandson in the foot. However, during the operation, Robert Sheldon Harte, Trotsky's bodyguard, was captured and killed. The Soviet defector Walter Krivitsky had learned of the plot and sent a warning to Trotsky through the US activist and "fellow traveller" J. B. Matthews. Trotsky acknowledged the warning, writing in a letter that "Krivitsky is right. We are the two men the OGPU is sworn to kill."

=== Argentina ===
After the failed attempt to assassinate Trotsky, Grigulevich and two of his accomplices (Laura Araujo Aguilar and Antonio Pujol Jimenez) were helped by Pablo Neruda to escape from the Mexican police. After Ramón Mercader killed Trotsky, Grigulevich was awarded with the Order of the Red Star. Later, Grigulevich was sent to Argentina under the code name "Artur", where he remained during World War II and organized anti-Nazi sabotage operations. He married a Mexican woman named Laura Araujo Aguilar, who was also a Soviet secret agent, operating under the code name LUIZA.

=== United States ===
During the late 1940s, Grigulevich's background as a Lithuanian-born Karaite and a polyglot who had lived outside of the USSR for most of his life marked him out as a target of the Stalinist campaign against "rootless cosmopolitans". In 1948, Grigulevich's Mexican-born wife was taken hostage by his Soviet bosses. While his wife was imprisoned, Soviet intelligence officials demanded several loyalty tests from Grigulevich, who was sent to operate a dead drop for another Soviet spy, Rudolf Abel, in New York City. Grigulevich later declared that, during this time, he was in constant fear for his life.

=== Soviet Union ===
Back in Moscow, Grigulevich was ordered to write a review for Bolshevik magazine of a book on US foreign policy in the Caribbean by Lev Zubok, an orthodox Marxist historian who the Stalinist authorities regarded as suspect on account of his Jewish background and because he had worked in the United States for ten years before settling in the USSR. Grigulevich saw in this assignment an opportunity to demonstrate his loyalty to the Stalinist regime by attacking Zubok as a cosmopolitan and an apologist for American imperialism, thus helping to set up Zubok and other intellectuals for a political purge. As a reward for his collaboration, Grigulevich was granted Soviet citizenship in 1949.

=== Costa Rican diplomat ===
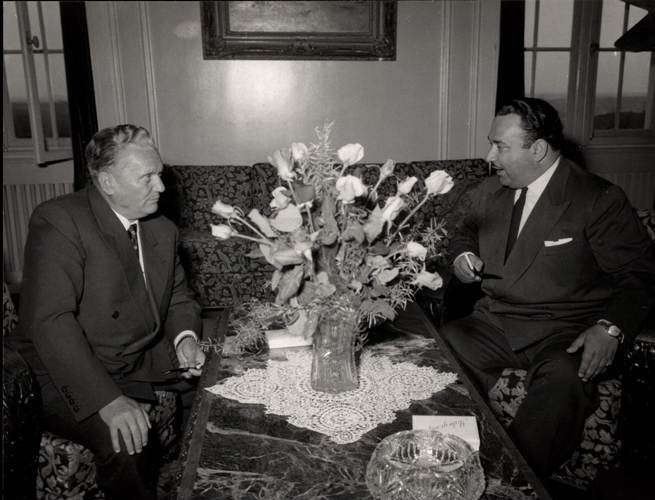
The Yugoslav head of state, Marshal Tito (left), receives the Costa Rican ambassador, Teodoro B. Castro (right), on 27 April 1953. Ambassador Castro was in fact a Soviet illegal agent, Iosif Grigulevich, who, under orders from Stalin and the KGB, was plotting to assassinate Tito.

In 1949, with the help of Joaquín Gutiérrez, a Costa Rican writer who harboured very pro-Soviet and Communist sympathies and who worked in his country's diplomatic corps, Grigulevich procured a false passport identifying him as Teodoro Castro Bonnefil, and settled in Rome. Grigulevich pretended to be the illegitimate son of a wealthy Costa Rican coffee producer, already deceased, and styled himself Teodoro B. Castro (using a middle initial in the "American manner"). He successfully established an import-export business in Rome and made extensive personal contacts with business figures and prelates of the Catholic church.

Castro also became a friend and business partner of former Costa Rican president José Figueres, who promoted his appointments in the Costa Rican diplomatic corps. In 1951, Castro became chargé d'affaires of the Costa Rican embassy in Rome, serving also as advisor to the Costa Rican delegation to the sixth session of the General Assembly of the United Nations, in Paris. In 1952, he officially became the Costa Rican ambassador to both Italy and Yugoslavia. In Rome, he befriended Prince Giulio Pacelli, a nephew of Pope Pius XII who served as Costa Rica's representative to the Holy See. In 1953, Castro was inducted as a knight of the Catholic Order of Malta. At the same time, he was secretly granted membership in the Communist Party of the Soviet Union.

In early 1952, the Soviet intelligence services assigned Grigulevich the task of conducting the assassination of Yugoslav leader Josip Broz Tito, who had broken with Stalin in 1948 over his insistence in maintaining Yugoslav independence from Soviet control (see Tito–Stalin split). In his role as the Costa Rican ambassador (he presented his credentials on 25 April 1953), Grigulevich met with Tito on several occasions. However, the death of Stalin in March 1953 prevented the assassination plans from going forward. At this time, Alexander Orlov, who had once managed Grigulevich in the Soviet spy network and who had later defected to the US, began to publish The Secret History of Stalin's Crimes. For fear that his identity would be exposed by Orlov, Grigulevich was summoned back to Moscow. In Rome, the sudden disappearance of the Costa Rican ambassador, along with his wife and daughter, created a stir, with rumors of Mafia involvement circulating in diplomatic circles.

== Historian ==
In Moscow, Grigulevich settled into a new life as an academic. In 1958, he received the degree of Candidate of Historical Sciences (the equivalent of a Western Ph.D.) with a dissertation entitled "The Vatican: Religion, Finance, and Politics". He then found employment as a research fellow at the Institute of Ethnography of the Soviet Academy of Sciences. In 1960, he received a Doctor of Historial Sciences degree (the equivalent of a Western habilitation to teach and conduct research at the university level) after defending a dissertation on the "Cultural Revolution in Cuba". He participated in the establishment of the Institute of Latin America and was appointed as head of a research group within the Institute of Ethnography.

During this phase of his life, Grigulevich wrote 58 books and countless articles, mostly on subjects connected with Latin America and the modern Roman Catholic Church. From 1976 to 1987 he was chief editor of the scholarly journal Общественные науки и современность ("Social Sciences and Contemporary World"). His popular biographies of Latin American revolutionaries, including Simón Bolívar, Pancho Villa, Francisco de Miranda, Benito Juárez, Che Guevara, Salvador Allende, David Alfaro Siqueiros, and Augusto César Sandino, published under the pen-name "I. Lavretsky" (Russian: И. Лаврецкий, after his mother's maiden name), were bestsellers in the USSR and were translated into other languages.

Grigulevich's great ambition during this stage of his life was to be elected as a member of the Academy of Sciences, considered the highest official rank for an intellectual in the USSR. However, his published work was regarded by many in the academic world as essentially journalistic. After extensive lobbying and trading in favors, Grigulevich finally succeeded in his fourth attempt to become corresponding member in 1979, but he was never made a full member of the Academy.

The dissident Soviet historian Alexander Nekrich described Grigulevich as "a joyful and witty person, and, as some said, both generous and cunning, a man who did not believe in anything, neither in God nor in devil." It is also reported that Grigulevich enjoyed expressing the view that it was "prostitutes, journalists, and spies who ruled the world". Colleagues were puzzled by the lack of any biographical information about Grigulevich before his 40s and by his refusal to be photographed. The details of Grigulevich's role as a Soviet agent were clarified only after the fall of the communist regime, particularly with the release of the "Mitrokhin archive" in the mid-1990s.
