= The Prophet: The Life of Leon Trotsky =

Biography of Leon Trotsky by Isaac Deutscher

- Book cover
- Author: Isaac Deutscher
- Country: United Kingdom
- Language: English
- Genre: Non-fiction, Biography
- Publisher: Oxford University Press (original editions)
- Published: 1954, 1959, 1963 (first editions)
- Media type: Print (Hardcover, Paperback), Kindle, (Note: The Kindle edition from Verso Books published in 2015 is of the unabridged three volume set, 2055pp.) Audiobook. (Note: The audiobook edition from Tantor Media published in 2025 is of the unabridged three volume set, and is narrated by Nigel Patterson, (Running time: 62:43:00).)
- No. of books: 3

The Prophet: The Life of Leon Trotsky is a three-volume biography of Russian revolutionary Leon Trotsky (Lev Davidovich Bronstein (Note: Russian: Лев "Лейба" Давидович Бронштейн, romanized: Lev "Leyba" Davidovich Bronshteyn, IPA: [lʲef lʲɪjbə dɐˈvʲidəvʲɪtɕ brɐnʂˈtʲejn], /ˈtrɒtski/; Russian: Лев Давидович Троцкий, romanized: Lev Davidovich Trotskiy, IPA: [ˈlʲef ˈtrotskʲɪj]; Ukrainian: Лев Давидович Троцький; also transliterated Lyev, Trotski, Trockij and Trotzky) (7 November [O.S. 26 October] 1879 – 21 August 1940)) by the Polish-British historian Isaac Deutscher. The series traces Trotsky's life from his early revolutionary activities to his eventual assassination in exile. Widely read and influential, (Note: See the Reception and academic reviews section of each volume.) the trilogy presents a sympathetic but critical account of Trotsky's political development and historical significance.

== Volumes ==
- The Prophet Armed: Trotsky, 1879–1921 (1954) (Note: The titles The Prophet Armed and The Prophet Unarmed reference a quote from Niccolò Machiavelli, "Hence it comes that all armed Prophets have been victorious, and all unarmed Prophets have been destroyed." (Niccolò Machiavelli, The Prince, Chapter 6).)
- The Prophet Unarmed: Trotsky, 1921–1929 (1959)
- The Prophet Outcast: Trotsky, 1929–1940 (1963)

== Similar or related works ==
- Trotsky: A Biography by Robert Service (2009)
- Trotsky by Tony Cliff (1989–1993, 4 vols.)
- Leon Trotsky: A Revolutionary's Life by Joshua Rubenstein (2011)

== About the author ==
Isaac Deutscher (Polish: Izaak Deutscher; 3 April 1907 – 19 August 1967) was a Polish Marxist writer, journalist and political activist who moved to the United Kingdom before the outbreak of World War II. He is best known as a biographer of Leon Trotsky and Joseph Stalin and as a commentator on Soviet affairs.

== See also ==
- Russian Revolution
- Marxist historiography
- Trotskyism
- Bibliography of the Russian Revolution and Civil War § Leon Trotsky
- Leon Trotsky bibliography
