= Mike's Election Guide 2008 =

- Author: Michael Moore
- Language: English
- Subject: Politics
- Publisher: Grand Central Publishing
- Publication date: 2008
- Publication place: United States
- Pages: 260
- ISBN: 0-446-54627-5

Mike's Election Guide 2008 is a 2008 political book by American filmmaker Michael Moore.

== Overview ==
A comedic guide on how to vote in the 2008 American elections.
