= Recorded Books =

Audiobook company

- Parent company: RBMedia
- Founded: 1978
- Founder: Henry Trentman
- Country of origin: United States
- Headquarters location: Prince Frederick, Maryland
- Distribution: Blackstone Publishing, Ingram Publisher Services
- Publication types: Audiobooks
- Official website: www.rbmedia.com

Recorded Books is an audiobook imprint of RBMedia, a publishing company with operations in countries globally. Recorded Books was formerly an independent audiobook company before being purchased and re-organized under RBMedia, where it is now an imprint. Recorded Books was founded in 1978 by Henry Trentman, one of the pioneers in the audiobook industry.

== History ==
Recorded Books was founded in 1978 by Henry Trentman in Charlotte Hall, Maryland. Trentman was a salesman who spent a lot of his time driving and listening to the radio and he believed there was a market for better quality recorded books on cassette tape targeted to commuters. Unlike other audiobooks sold at the time, which were usually abridged to 2–4 hours long, Trentman envisioned unabridged productions of 20 or more tapes which could be rented mail-order, and that would be of high quality sound and professional narrators.

The company's first recording was in 1979 as The Sea-Wolf by Jack London narrated by Frank Muller, a local actor at Washington DC's Arena Stage. Muller remembered "this traveling salesman who had a crazy idea about recording books onto cassettes and marketing them to commuters." Muller would remain one of Recorded Books' most prolific and popular narrators over the years. At first, the book titles were in the public domain, such as Jack London. However, after Recorded Books picked professional stage actor Alexander Spencer to narrate books, they began branching out into copyright works.

For the first six years, Trentman worked at Recorded Books part-time since the company did not generate enough revenue to justify his coming on full-time. Later, as the company grew during the 1980s, it opened a new recording facility in New York City near Times Square. According to John Colapinto (2012):

It actually took about six years for Recorded Books to catch on. At first, people thought that audiobooks were for the blind. ... Commercial audiobooks started to take off in the early eighties, when suburbanites discovered that they were an ideal way to mitigate the horrors of long car commutes. According to Claudia Howard of Recorded Books: "The business was, in those days, a primitive Netflix in that they were rental businesses. You'd call an 800 number with your credit card and rent your cassette book for thirty days through the mail. It came in a cardboard box with a row of cassettes. Eventually, they were on CDs. The last ten years has been the download—you stream them straight to your computer or download straight to your cellphone."

In the 1980s, the company established its headquarters in Prince Frederick, Maryland.

In the 1990s, it created an in-house sales department and a department to focus on schools and education. In 1997, Recorded Books began selling directly to the U.K. and by 1999 the company had launched W.F. Howes Ltd., a wholly owned subsidiary in the U.K.

== Mergers and deals ==
Recorded Books was acquired by Haights Cross Communications in December 1999, where Recorded Books operated as a division of that company. In 2002, Haights Cross acquired Audio Adventures, a brand established in the truck stop market to tie in with 650 rental kiosks in truck stop centers Recorded Books previously had. In January 2014, it was announced that Haights Cross sold Recorded Books to Wasserstein & Co., an independent private equity and investment firm in New York and Los Angeles.

In May 2014, Recorded Books acquired HighBridge Audio from Workman Publishing. HighBridge Audio was initially founded by Minnesota Public Radio in the early 1980s to produce and distribute recordings of Garrison Keillor's A Prairie Home Companion. Since then, HighBridge produced approximately 45 titles a year in the forms of spoken word audio cassettes, CDs and downloadable audio books. The company was best known for publishing public-radio related titles, as well as Oprah's Book Club titles. HighBridge made use of two readers in its audio book production for works primarily involving two main characters. Other popular titles published by HighBridge included The Time Traveler's Wife, Water for Elephants, Life of Pi and Across the Nightingale Floor.

In January 2015, Recorded Books announced its acquisition of Tantor Media Later in 2015, Wasserstein sold Recorded Books to Shamrock Advisors, a private equity firm.

In April 2017 the company reorganized. The new company name is RBMedia and its imprints include Recorded Books, HighBridge Audio, Tantor Media, ChristianAudio, Gildan Media, W.F. Howes (UK), and Wavesound (Australia). It would sell or distribute titles directly to customers through audiobooks.com, through libraries and resellers such as Audible.

As of 2017, Recorded Books operates as an imprint of RBMedia.

In June 2020, Recorded Books announced a deal for Blackstone Audio to exclusively manufacture, sell and distribute their physical media audiobook titles (CD & MP3) to consumers, retail, distribution and libraries in North America.

== Sales and operations ==
Although Recorded Books was not a public company prior to its 2017 acquisition, they released some operations and sales figures over the years that provide a sense of the company's growth and size.

According to a 2004 article, most of Recorded Books' 330 employees were based in Maryland, with 15 staff in New York, 15 in the United Kingdom and a number of sales representatives around the United States. Studio director Claudia Howard who had been with the company since 1984 oversaw operations.

In a 1989 newspaper article, it was reported that Recorded Books had about 450 titles in its catalog, versus about 2,500 from its main competitor Books on Tape (BoT), but that Recorded Books focused more on the quality of its sound recordings than BoT did. Six years later in a 1995 article, it was reported Recorded Books had produced 1,600 books. In 2004, it was reported that of Recorded Books' 800 new unabridged titles per year, 650 are released to libraries/schools/mail order/rental. Fifty of those 650 titles are made available for the retail sales market. Of the 800 new titles, 150 titles are sold only into the U.K. market. First quarter 2004 had more than $16 million in net sales. In January 2014, a press release said Recorded Books had over 13,500 audiobook titles. In January 2015, after the acquisition of Tantor Media, Recorded Books a catalog of more than 22,000 titles. In August 2015, after the acquisition by Shamrock Advisors, the company reported publishing 3,000 new books annually with catalog of 25,000 titles.
