= RBMedia =

Audiobook publisher

- Predecessor: Recorded Books
- Founded: 2017; 9 years ago
- Founder: Shamrock Advisors
- Country of origin: United States
- Headquarters location: Landover, Maryland
- Publication types: Audiobooks, Books
- Imprints: Recorded Books; HighBridge; Tantor Media; Kalorama Audio; Christian Audio; Ascent Audio; W.F. Howes; WaveSound; BookaVivo; GraphicAudio
- Owners: Shamrock Advisors; (2017–18); Kohlberg Kravis Roberts; (2018–2023); H.I.G. Capital; (2023–present); Francisco Partners; (2023–present)
- Official website: https://rbmediaglobal.com/

RBMedia is an audiobook publishing company with sales globally. Headquartered in Landover, Maryland, it claims to be the largest audiobook publisher in the world.

The company was founded in 2017 through the acquisition of independent audiobook companies, which now operate as imprints of RBMedia. Among them are: Recorded Books, Tantor Media, HighBridge Audio, ChristianAudio, Gildan Media, W.F. Howes, Wavesound, GraphicAudio.

With studios in New York and elsewhere, it is based near the former Recorded Books headquarters. After being assembled by Shamrock Advisors and controlled by Kohlberg Kravis Roberts, it was acquired in September 2023 by H.I.G. Capital and Francisco Partners.

== History ==
=== Recorded Books ===
Recorded Books (later to be the "RB" in RBMedia) was founded in Maryland in 1978 and was a pioneer in the industry. When it was acquired in December 1999 by Haights Cross Communications, the company operated as its division.

Eight months after purchasing HighBridge Audio from Workman Publishing, the division announced the acquisition of Tantor Media in January 2015. Later the same year, Recorded Books was sold to Shamrock Advisors, a private equity firm.

=== RBMedia ===
When it was organized in April 2017 and became known as RBMedia, its imprints included Recorded Books, HighBridge Audio, Tantor Media, ChristianAudio, Gildan Media, W.F. Howes (UK), and Wavesound (Australia). It would sell or distribute titles directly to customers through Audiobooks.com, libraries, and resellers such as Audible.

In the month that its new name was revealed, the company acquired Audiobooks.com, which would launch in the UK six months later. In September 2017, RBMedia purchased Gildan Media, a business book publisher.

In July 2018, Shamrock Advisors sold the company to private equity firm Kohlberg Kravis Roberts (KKR).

In March 2020, RBMedia acquired GraphicAudio, a producer of immersive full-cast and sound-effect productions with brands such as Marvel Comics, DC Comics, Dynamite Entertainment, Vault Comics and authors such as Brandon Sanderson, Peter V. Brett, Michael J. Sullivan, R. A. Salvatore, William W. Johnstone, and Brent Weeks.

Three months later, it sold its library assets to OverDrive, Inc.; this includes RBDigital, an app and service for the distribution of digital content. RBMedia and OverDrive are both owned by KKR, with KKR's OverDrive purchase concluded in June 2020. The sale of RBMedia's library division to OverDrive represents a merger of KKR's related assets.

In March 2021, RBMedia acquired Booka, a Barcelona-based audiobook publishing company rebranded as BookaVivo. In May, the company acquired McGraw-Hill Professional's audiobook business including the entire catalog of previously published titles and exclusive rights to all future titles.

In August 2021, RBMedia launched Ascent Audio for business focused books. The catalog includes audiobooks from the previous acquisition of Gildan Media and McGraw-Hill Professional. It claimed to be the world's largest catalog of business audiobooks.

In December, a month after announcing that it had sold Audiobooks.com to Storytel for $135 million, RBMedia acquired the audiobook self-publisher Author’s Republic, including its traditional audiobook subsidiary Novel Audio. In January 2022, it purchased the German audiobook publisher ABOD, with works to be published under the RBmedia Verlag brand.

In 2023, it was announced that KKR sold RBMedia to H.I.G. Capital and Francisco Partners. In 2024, RBMedia acquired Dreamscape Media from Midwest Tape.
