= Joshua Rubenstein =

American activist, writer and scholar

- Born: New Britain, Connecticut
- Education: Columbia University (BA)
- Occupations: Writer, activist
- Writing career
- Notable awards: National Jewish Book Award (2002)
- Website: Joshua Rubenstein

Joshua Rubenstein is an American activist, writer and scholar of literature, dissent, and politics in the former Soviet Union. He won a National Jewish Book Award in Eastern European studies in 2002 for his book Stalin’s Secret Pogrom.

== Biography ==
Rubenstein is a native of New Britain, Connecticut. He received his B.A. from Columbia University in 1971, graduating Phi Beta Kappa. At Columbia, he was a student of Lionel Trilling. He also took part in the Columbia University protests of 1968 as a freshman. During college, Rubenstein took a six-week language tour of the Soviet Union and met William Brui, an artist in Leningrad whom he would eventually profile in ARTnews, resulting in his hiring by the Boston Phoenix.

He joined Amnesty International in 1975 and served as its Northeast Regional Director for 37 years. He worked with Soviet dissidents and on behalf of prisoners of conscience, and organized campaigns to free activists in Pakistan, the former Rhodesia, and Ecuador. He is also critical of Israel and its human rights abuses and is an advocate against death penalty.

As a writer, Rubenstein has published eight books covering Soviet dissidents, Joseph Stalin's purges on Jewish intellectual leaders, and biographies of Ilya Ehrenburg and Leon Trotsky.

He is currently the associate director for Major Gifts at Harvard Law School and was a longtime associate of the Davis Center for Russian and Eurasian Studies at Harvard University.

== See also ==
- Leon Trotsky: A Revolutionary's Life by Joshua Rubenstein (2011)
- Trotsky: A Biography by Robert Service (2009).
- The Prophet: The Life of Leon Trotsky (1953, 1959, 1963, 3 vols.) by Isaac Deutscher.
