= Tantor Media =

American book publishing company

- Parent company: RBMedia
- Founded: 2000
- Founder: Kevin Colebank, Allen Colebank, and Laura Colebank
- Headquarters location: Old Saybrook, Connecticut
- Distribution: Ingram Publisher Services
- Publication types: Audiobooks, Books
- Official website: www.tantor.com

Tantor Media is an imprint of RBMedia, its parent company. It produces unabridged fiction and nonfiction audiobooks. Tantor was founded in 2000 as an independent publisher. In January 2015, Tantor was sold to Recorded Books but continued to operate with its own imprint and offices. In 2017, Recorded Books re-organized into RBMedia and Tantor operated as an imprint of RBMedia.

== History ==
In 2000, Tantor Media was founded by brothers Kevin and Allen Colebank and Kevin’s wife, Laura, above a San Clemente, California garage. Tantor is Tarzan's elephant friend in Edgar Rice Burroughs' book Tarzan of the Apes, the first audiobook the company published. In 2004, Tantor relocated to Old Saybrook, Connecticut. By 2007 Tantor experiencing rapid sales growth of 628% since 2005. In 2009, Tantor Media began publishing as Tantor Audio. In 2011, Tantor Media launched Tantor Studios, with audio production and distribution services for publishers and authors. In 2012, Tantor Media began publishing print and ebooks.

In 2014, Recorded Books acquired Tantor Media. In 2017, Recorded Books re-organized into RBMedia.
