= Leon Trotsky: A Revolutionary's Life =

Biography of Leon Trotsky

- Book cover
- Author: Joshua Rubenstein
- Original title: The Life and Death of Leon Trotsky (2009). (Note: The book was originally published in 2009 as The Life and Death of Leon Trotsky by Yale University Press. The title was changed to Leon Trotsky: A Revolutionary's Life for the 2011 edition published by Yale University Press.)
- Language: English
- Series: Yale Jewish Lives
- Subject: Russian Revolution, Leon Trotsky, Soviet Union, Communism, Joseph Stalin
- Genre: Non-fiction, Biography, History, Politics
- Publisher: Yale University Press
- Publication date: 2011
- Publication place: United States
- Media type: Hardcover, Paperback, Kindle
- Pages: 240
- ISBN: 978-0300137248
- OCLC: 696942380
- Website: Publisher's page

The Life and Death of Leon Trotsky is a biography of Leon Trotsky by Joshua Rubenstein. The book was originally published in 2009 by Yale University Press and is part of the Yale Jewish Lives series.

== Synopsis and structure ==
Leon Trotsky: A Revolutionary’s Life by Joshua Rubenstein is a concise biography that explores Trotsky's role as a revolutionary, his Jewish background, and his political downfall. Part of Yale University Press's Jewish Lives series, the book presents Trotsky as a complex figure—both a key architect of the Russian Revolution and a victim of the regime he helped establish.

While the biography highlights Trotsky's intellectual and organizational contributions, it also underscores his ideological rigidity and political miscalculations. Rubenstein examines Trotsky's ambivalent relationship with his Jewish identity, noting moments of empathy toward Jewish suffering despite his self-identification as a Marxist internationalist. Reviewers praised the book's clarity and accessibility.

== Reception ==
- Legvold, Robert (2012). "Review of Leon Trotsky: A Revolutionary's Life by Joshua Rubenstein". Foreign Affairs. 91 (2). Council on Foreign Relations: 187–188.
- Swain, Geoffrey (2012). "Review of Leon Trotsky: A Revolutionary's Life by Joshua Rubenstein". Russian Review. 71 (4). Wiley: 702–703.
- Daly, Jonathan (2012). "Review of Leon Trotsky: A Revolutionary's Life by Joshua Rubenstein". The Historian. 74 (4). Wiley: 890–891.
- Thatcher, Ian D. (2012). "Review of Leon Trotsky: A Revolutionary's Life by Joshua Rubenstein". The Slavonic and East European Review. 90 (4). Modern Humanities Research Association, University College London, School of Slavonic and East European Studies: 772–775.

== Release information ==
- Hardcover: 2011 (First Edition), Yale University Press, 240pp. ISBN 9780300137248.
- Paperback: 2013, Yale University Press, 240pp. ISBN 9780300198324.
- Kindle: 2011, Yale University Press.

== Similar or related works ==
- Trotsky: A Biography by Robert Service (2009).
- Trotsky by Tony Cliff (1989–1993, 4 vols.).
- The Prophet: The Life of Leon Trotsky (1953, 1959, 1963, 3 vols.) by Isaac Deutscher.

== About the author ==
Joshua Rubenstein is an American activist, writer and scholar of literature, dissent, and politics in the former Soviet Union. He won a National Jewish Book Award in Eastern European studies in 2002 for his book Stalin’s Secret Pogrom.

== See also ==
- Russian Revolution
- Marxist historiography
- Trotskyism
- Bibliography of the Russian Revolution and Civil War § Leon Trotsky
- Leon Trotsky bibliography
