= Trotsky: A Biography =

Biography of Leon Trotsky by Robert Service

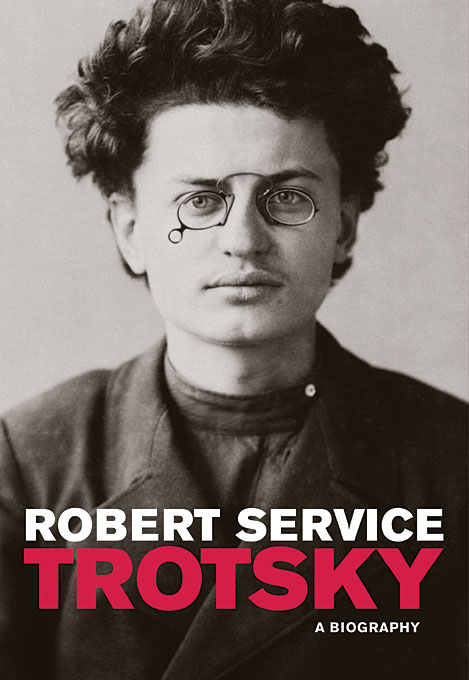
- The first edition cover of the book, depicting Trotsky.
- Author: Robert Service
- Language: English
- Subject: Biography
- Publisher: Macmillan Publishers
- Publication date: 2009
- Publication place: United Kingdom
- Media type: Print (hardback & paperback)
- Awards: Duff Cooper Prize
- Preceded by: Stalin: A Biography

Trotsky: A Biography is a biography of the Marxist theorist and revolutionary Leon Trotsky (1879–1940) written by the English historian Robert Service, then a professor in Russian history at the University of Oxford. It was first published by Macmillan in 2009 and later translated into other languages.

Having converted to the Marxist revolutionary movement in early life, Trotsky had been a member of the Bolshevik Party and a significant figure in the October Revolution of 1917 which brought the Bolsheviks to power in the Russian Empire. Following the death of Vladimir Lenin, Trotsky's rival Joseph Stalin ascended to the Soviet leadership. Trotsky was internally exiled in 1928, deported in 1929 and murdered in Mexico in 1940.

After his death, various biographers produced works studying Trotsky; Service's differs from many of these in its emphasis. He argues that Trotsky has been romanticized by western leftists for decades, instead claiming that Trotsky laid the groundwork for the Stalinist totalitarian state in the Soviet Union and that had he become Soviet leader rather than Stalin, the end result would have been very similar.

The book received a mixed reception upon publication. The mainstream British and American press was overwhelmingly positive. Conversely, reviews in peer-reviewed, academic journals were more critical, highlighting factual errors throughout the text and viewing his work as an attempt to discredit Trotsky as a historical figure.

In 2010, a rebuttal to Service's historical interpretation was written by American political theorist and Trotskyist David North in his review "In Defense of Leon Trotsky". In 2011, fourteen professional historians and political scientists from Germany and Austria opposed the German publication of Services's book over concerns over its lack of reliable sources, anti-Semitism, and the number of factual errors. It was published in German by Suhrkamp Verlag in 2012.

== Background and content ==
Prior to the publication of Trotsky: A Biography, Service had written a number of historical studies and biographies of Russia in the period of revolution: The Bolshevik Party in Revolution 1917-23: A Study in Organizational Change (1979), A History of Twentieth-Century Russia (1997), The Russian Revolution, 1900-27 (1999), A History of Modern Russia, from Nicholas II to Putin (1998, Second edition in 2003), Lenin: A Biography (2000), Russia: Experiment with a People (2002), Stalin: A Biography (2004) and Comrades: A World History of Communism (2007).

Service is of the opinion, controversial among Trotskyists and anti-Stalinist Leninists, that politically the difference between Lenin, Trotsky and Stalin was only marginal and that excessive antidemocratic attitudes and use of terror as a mean of politics, was an embedded attitude with all three men and a significant portions of the Bolshevik leadership from the earliest days. The excesses of Stalin was mainly a matter of personality and background such as ruthlessness, jealousy, a deep feeling of anger emanating from being continually overlooked and disregarded, a level of personal paranoia, and never failing memory regarding hurt and perceived enemies and a deep lust for vengeance on a personal level.

In Service's account, Lenin favoured Stalin until their falling-out in 1923 opened his eyes, too late, to the danger of a future with Stalin in power. Trotsky failed to form alliances, was socially inept and was never fully accepted by the Bolshevik leadership, having joined the party late. Stalin, unlike his opponent, was an astute politician and tactician, one of the few who understood the consequences and means of political maneuvering in an environment where appeals to the masses, at which the other leaders were strong, had been systematically ruled out by the Red Terror and by the prohibition of most forms of opposition, measures the leaders had themselves promoted and embraced.

The ability to think theoretically, appeal in writing or speech to the public had rapidly diminished in political value by 1924 and was steadily declining in political value, and only alliances counted, which was Stalin's strength. Trotsky had himself aided the cutting off the only branch which might have supported him.

== Critical reception ==
=== Academic reviews ===
His biography of Trotsky was positively reviewed in the British and American press on its publication, but two years later was strongly criticized by Service's Hoover Institution colleague Bertrand Patenaude in a review for The American Historical Review. Patenaude, reviewing Service's book alongside a rebuttal by the Trotskyist David North (In Defence of Leon Trotsky), charged Service with making dozens of factual errors, misrepresenting evidence, and "fail[ing] to examine in a serious way Trotsky's political ideas". He also described Service as seeking to “discredit Trotsky as a historical figure and a human being”. He concluded with the statement that his work “fails to meet basic standards of historical scholarship”.

Service responded that the book's factual errors were minor and that Patenaude's own book on Trotsky presented him as a "noble martyr". In July 2009, prior to the publication of his own book, Robert Service had written a review of Partenaude's publication Stalin's Nemesis: The Exile and Murder of Leon Trotsky which he applauded for being "vividly told" but also criticised for neglecting Trotsky's crimes while sharing power in the USSR.

The book has also been harshly criticized by the German historian of communism Hermann Weber who led a campaign to prevent Suhrkamp Verlag from publishing it in Germany. Fourteen historians and sociologists signed a letter to the publishing house. The letter cited "a host of factual errors", the "repugnant connotations" of the passages in which Service deals with Trotsky's Jewish origins, and Service's recourse to "formulas associated with Stalinist propaganda" for the purpose of discrediting Trotsky. Suhrkamp published the German translation in July 2012.

Historian Paul Le Blanc regarded his work as a “second assassination” and highlighted a number of issues with the contents of his work. This included several inaccuracies, omissions, a negative characterization of Trotsky’s personality and the limited engagement with his Marxist theories. Le Blanc also drew attention to his political associations with the Hoover Institution which has a “conservative orientation” and decried the “central point of this biography, repeated over and over again, was that Trotsky’s orientation does not represent any meaningful alternative to Stalinism”. Le Blanc argued that this proposition contradicted the actual evidence. He also referenced the views of contemporary Trotskyists and non-Trotskyists from the period such as Winston Churchill who emphasised the clear differences between Stalin and Trotsky.

In the London Review of Books, historian Sheila Fitzpatrick wrote a comparative review of Service’s biography alongside a publication by Patenaude on the last years of Trotsky’s life in exile. Fitzpatrick noted that Service subscribed to the same view as Dmitri Volkogonov that Lenin, Stalin and Trotsky were “historically almost indistinguishable from each other” without providing any new additional sources to his work. However, Fitzpatrick questioned Service’s premise of historical inevitability in that the Soviet Union would have experienced the same “totalitarian despotism under Trotskyist rule”. Fitzpatrick also found it implausible that Trotsky like Stalin would have launched an anti-semitic campaign after World War II or initiated the Great Purge. Rather, Fitzpatrick suggested Trotsky would presumably have provided good leadership during the Second World War but may have struggled to maintain party cohesion as seen during the succession struggle after 1924.

=== Press reviews ===
Reviews in the mainstream British press were predominantly positive. In The Daily Telegraph, the popular historian Simon Sebag Montefiore described Trotsky as "an outstanding, fascinating biography of this dazzling titan." Believing that it offered a much-needed "scholarly revision" of the revolutionary's "historical reputation", he praised the way that it explored "the ugly egotism and unpleasant, overweening arrogance, the belief in and enthusiastic practice of killing on a colossal scale, the political ineptitude [and] the limit of ambition [of Trotsky]." Writing for the Literary Review, the political philosopher John N. Gray claimed that "the full extent of Trotsky's role in building Soviet totalitarianism has not been detailed – until now". Considering the book to be "[r]igorously researched," he notes that Service "surpasses himself", painting a portrait of Trotsky that is "genuinely revelatory" and "very different from the one celebrated by bien pensants." Although focusing his review on a discussion of what he interprets as the negative side to Trotsky's personality, Gray claims that Service's work is "scrupulously balanced". Summing up his review, Gray proclaims that Service has authored the "best biography of Trotsky to date, and there seems little reason why anyone should write another."

In contrast, Tariq Ali, socialist activist and a former Trotskyist still appreciating Trotsky, produced a negative review of Service's book for The Guardian. Describing the work as "stodgy", Ali claims that the work is highly politically motivated by Service's anti-communist views, believing that Service's view "can be summarised in a sentence: Trotsky was a ruthless and cold-blooded murderer and deserves to be exposed as such." He relates that this "counter-factual approach is nothing new", having been the "stock-in-trade" for both anti-communist and Stalinist critics of Trotsky for decades. In contrast, he weighed the biographical work produced by Service unfavourably against the three-volume trilogy written by Polish historian Isaac Deutscher on the life of Trotsky. Ali regarded the latter work as authoritative on the subject matter since its original publication over fifty years ago and a "literary-historical masterpiece".

== See also ==
- Criticism of Marxism
- David North - American political theorist that produced a rebuttal to Service with his work, “In Defense of Leon Trotsky”.
- Hoover Institution
- Isaac Deutscher - Polish historian that produced a three-volume biography of Trotsky.
- The Prophet: The Life of Leon Trotsky
- Leon Trotsky: A Revolutionary's Life
- Lenin: A Biography
- Stalin: A Biography
- The Stalinist Legacy
