= Bolshevism =

Ideology of the Bolsheviks

Bolshevism (derived from Bolshevik) is a revolutionary socialist Soviet Leninist, and later Marxist–Leninist, current of political thought and political regime that is associated with the formation of a rigidly centralized, cohesive and disciplined party of social revolution, and is focused on overthrowing the existing capitalist state system, seizing power and establishing the "dictatorship of the proletariat".

Bolshevism originated at the beginning of the 20th century in the Russian Empire, and was associated with the activities of the Bolshevik faction within the Russian Social Democratic Labour Party led by Vladimir Lenin, Bolshevism's main theorist. Other theoreticians included Joseph Stalin, Leon Trotsky, Nikolai Bukharin and Yevgeni Preobrazhensky. While Bolshevism was based on Marxist philosophy, it also absorbed elements of the ideology and practice of the socialist revolutionaries of the second half of the 19th century, such as Sergey Nechaev, Pyotr Tkachev, and Nikolay Chernyshevsky, and was influenced by Russian agrarian socialist movements like the Narodniks.

In October 1917, the Bolshevik Party won a majority in the revolutionary workers' councils (soviets) which had been formed throughout Russia following the February Revolution. It subsequently organized the October Revolution, which overthrew the Provisional Government and replaced it with a state power under the control of the soviets, led by the Bolsheviks along with other left-wing socialists.

Some researchers attribute to Bolshevik theory the program of Joseph Stalin, who headed the All-Union Communist Party (Bolsheviks) and at the same time possessed full state power in the Soviet Union. However, others (both Stalin's contemporaries and later) do not confuse "Bolshevism" and "Stalinism" proper, considering them to be multidirectional (revolutionary and thermidorian) phenomena.

The expression "Bolshevism", and later "Communism", has become established in Western historiography in the sense of a certain set of features of Soviet power in a certain political period. The Bolshevik Party retained the moniker "Bolshevik" in its formal names until October 1952, when the 19th Congress adopted the name 'Communist Party of the Soviet Union'. At present, the name "Bolsheviks" is actively used by various groups of Marxist–Leninists and Trotskyists.

== Concepts ==
=== Dictatorship of the proletariat ===
Either the dictatorship of the landowners and capitalists, or the dictatorship of the proletariat [...] There is no middle course [...] There is no middle course anywhere in the world, nor can there be.

— Lenin, claiming that people had only two choices; a choice between two different, but distinct class dictatorships.

Lenin, according to his interpretation of Marx's theory of the state, believed democracy to be unattainable anywhere in the world before the proletariat seized power. According to Marxist theory, the state is a vehicle for oppression and is headed by a ruling class, an "organ of class rule". He believed that during his lifetime, the only viable solution was dictatorship since the war was heading into a final conflict between the "progressive forces of socialism and the degenerate forces of capitalism". The Russian Revolution of 1917 was already a failure according to its original aim, which was to act as an inspiration for a world revolution. As a result, the initial anti-statist posture and the active campaigning for direct democracy was replaced with dictatorship. From the perspective of the Bolsheviks, the rationale for this change was Russia's lack of development, its status as the sole socialist state in the world, its encirclement by imperialist powers, and its internal encirclement by the peasantry.

Marx, similar to Lenin, considered it fundamentally irrelevant whether a bourgeois state was ruled according to a republican, parliamentarian, or constitutionally monarchic political system because this did not change the mode of production itself. These systems, regardless of whether they are ruled by an oligarchy or by mass participation, were ultimately all a dictatorship of the bourgeoisie by definition because the bourgeoisie, by the very condition of their class and its interests, would promote and implement policies in their class interests and thus in defense of capitalism. There was a difference, though; Lenin, after the failures of the world revolutions, argued that this did not necessarily have to change under the dictatorship of the proletariat. The reasoning came from wholly practical considerations: the majority of the country's inhabitants were not communists and the party could not introduce parliamentary democracy since that was inconsistent with their ideology and would lead to the party losing power. He therefore concluded that "[t]he form of government has absolutely nothing to do with" the nature of the dictatorship of the proletariat. Bukharin and Trotsky agreed with Lenin, both claiming that the revolution had only destroyed the old, but failing completely in creating anything sort of new. Lenin had now concluded that the dictatorship of the proletariat would not alter the relationship of power between persons, but rather "transform their productive relations so that, in the long run, the realm of necessity could be overcome and, with that, genuine social freedom realised".

It was in the period of 1920–1921 that Soviet leaders and ideologists began differentiating between socialism and communism; hitherto the two terms had been used to describe similar conditions. From then, the two terms developed separate meanings. According to Soviet ideology, Russia was in the transition from capitalism to socialism (referred to interchangeably under Lenin as the dictatorship of the proletariat), socialism being the intermediate stage to communism, with the latter being the final stage which follows after socialism. By now, the party leaders believed that universal mass participation and true democracy could only take form in the last stage, if only because of Russia's current conditions at the time.

[Because] the proletariat is still so divided, so degraded, so corrupted in parts [...] that an organization taking in the whole proletariat cannot directly exercise proletarian dictatorship. It can be exercised only by a vanguard that has absorbed the revolutionary energy of the class.

— Lenin, explaining the increasingly dictatorial nature of the regime.

In early Bolshevik discourse, the term "dictatorship of the proletariat" was of little significance; the few times it was mentioned, it was likened to the form of government which had existed in the Paris Commune. With the ensuing Russian Civil War and the social and material devastation that followed, however, its meaning was transformed from communal democracy to disciplined totalitarian rule. By now, Lenin had concluded that only a proletarian regime as oppressive as its opponents could survive in this world. The powers previously bestowed upon the soviets were now given to the Council of People's Commissars; the central government was in turn to be governed by "an army of steeled revolutionary Communists [by Communists he referred to the Party]". In a letter to Gavril Myasnikov, Lenin in late 1920 explained his new reinterpretation of the term "dictatorship of the proletariat";

Dictatorship means nothing more nor less than authority untrammelled by any laws, absolutely unrestricted by any rules whatever, and based directly on force. The term 'dictatorship' has no other meaning but this.

Lenin justified these policies by claiming that all states were class states by nature, and that these states were maintained through class struggle. This meant that the dictatorship of the proletariat in the Soviet Union could only be "won and maintained by the use of violence against the bourgeoisie". The main problem with this analysis is that the Party came to view anyone opposing or holding alternate views of the party as bourgeoisie. The worst enemy remained the moderates, however, which were "objectively" considered to be "the real agents of the bourgeoisie in the working class movement, the labour lieutenants of the capitalist class".

Consequently, "bourgeoisie" became synonymous with "opponent" and with people who disagreed with the party in general. These oppressive measures led to another reinterpretation of the dictatorship of the proletariat and socialism in general; it was now defined as a purely economic system. Slogans and theoretical works about democratic mass participation and collective decision-making were now replaced with texts which supported authoritarian management. Considering the situation, the party believed it had to use the same powers as the bourgeoisie to transform Russia, for there was no other alternative. Lenin began arguing that the proletariat, similar to the bourgeoisie, did not have a single preference for a form of government, and because of that dictatorship was acceptable to both the party and the proletariat. In a meeting with party officials, Lenin stated—in line with his economist view of socialism—that "[i]ndustry is indispensable, democracy is not", further arguing that "we do not promise any democracy or any freedom".

=== Expropriation ===
Realizing the Leninist slogan "rob the robbers", the Bolsheviks en masse carried out a complete confiscation (expropriation) from the owners of private property, which they considered acquired through the exploitation of the working people, that is, the robbery of the workers. At the same time, the Bolsheviks never found out whether private property was obtained through their own labor, or through the exploitation of other people, whether the owners adequately paid for hired labor, what part of the confiscated private property the owner created with their own labor.

=== Anti-imperialism ===
Imperialism is capitalism at a stage of development at which the dominance of monopolies and finance-capital is established; in which the export of capital has acquired pronounced importance; in which the division of the world among the international trusts has begun; in which the divisions of all territories of the globe among the biggest capitalist powers has been completed.

— Lenin, citing the main features of capitalism in the age of imperialism in Imperialism: the Highest Stage of Capitalism.

The Marxist theory on imperialism was conceived by Lenin in his book, Imperialism: the Highest Stage of Capitalism (published in 1917). It was written in response to the theoretical crisis within Marxist thought, which occurred due to capitalism's recovery in the 19th century. According to Lenin, imperialism was a specific stage of development of capitalism; a stage he referred to as state monopoly capitalism. The Marxist movement was split on how to solve capitalism's resurgence and revitalisation after the great depression of the late-19th century. Eduard Bernstein, from the Social Democratic Party of Germany (SDP), considered capitalism' revitalisation as proof that capitalism was evolving into a more humane system, further adding that the basic aims of socialists were not to overthrow the state, but rather to take power through elections. On the other hand, Karl Kautsky, from the SDP, held a highly dogmatic view, claiming that there was no crisis within Marxist theory. Both of them, however, denied or belittled the role of class contradictions in society after the crisis. In contrast, Lenin believed that capitalism' resurgence was the beginning of a new phase of capitalism; this stage being created because of a strengthening of class contradiction, not because of its reduction.

Lenin did not know when the imperialist stage of capitalism began, and claimed it would be foolish to look for a specific year, however he did assert it began at the beginning of the 20th century (at least in Europe). Lenin believed that the economic crisis of 1900 accelerated and intensified the concentration of industry and banking, which led to the transformation of the finance capital connection to industry into the monopoly of large banks." In Imperialism: the Highest Stage of Capitalism, Lenin wrote; "the twentieth century marks the turning-point from the old capitalism to the new, from the domination of capital in general to the domination of finance capital." Lenin's defines imperialism as the monopoly stage of capitalism.

=== Socialism in one country ===
The concept of "socialism in one country" was conceived by Stalin in his struggle against Leon Trotsky and his concept of permanent revolution. In 1924, Trotsky published his pamphlet Lessons of October in which he stated that socialism in the Soviet Union would fail because of the backward state of economic development unless a world revolution began. Stalin responded to Trotsky's pamphlet with his article, "October and Comrade Trotsky's Theory of Permanent Revolution". In it, Stalin stated that he did not believe an inevitable conflict between the working class and the peasants would take place, further adding that "socialism in one country is completely possible and probable". Stalin held the view common amongst most Bolsheviks at the time; there was possibility of real success for socialism in the Soviet Union despite the country's backwardness and international isolation. While Grigoriy Zinoviev, Lev Kamenev and Nikolai Bukharin, together with Stalin, opposed Trotsky's theory of permanent revolution, they diverged on how socialism could be built. According to Bukharin, Zinoviev and Kamenev supported the resolution of the 14th Conference (held in 1925) which stated that "we cannot complete the building of socialism due to our technological backwardness." Despite the rather cynical attitude, Zinoviev and Kamenev did believe that a defective form of socialism could be constructed. At the 14th Conference, Stalin reiterated his position, claiming that socialism in one country was feasible despite the capitalist blockade of the country. After the conference, Stalin wrote "Concerning the Results of the XIV Conference of the RCP(b)", in which he stated that the peasantry would not turn against the socialist system because he believed they had a self-interest in preserving. The contradictions which would arise with the peasantry during the socialist transition, Stalin surmised, could "be overcome by our own efforts". He concluded that the only viable threat to socialism in the Soviet Union was a military intervention.

In late 1925, Stalin received a letter from a party official which stated that his position of "Socialism in One Country" was in contradiction with Friedrich Engels own writings on the subject. Stalin countered, stating that Engels' writings 'reflected' "the era of pre-monopoly capitalism, the pre-imperialist era when there were not yet the conditions of an uneven, abrupt development of the capitalist countries." From 1925 onwards, Bukharin began writing extensively on the subject, and in 1926, Stalin wrote On Questions of Leninism, which contained his best-known writings on the subject. Zinoviev, with the publishing of Leninism, began countering Bukharin's and Stalin's arguments, claiming that socialism in one country was possible, but only in the short-run, and claimed that without a world revolution it would be impossible to safeguard the Soviet Union from the "restoration of bourgeoisie relations". Zinoviev held steadfast to Lenin's own position from 1917 to 1922, and continued to claim that only a defecting form of socialism could be constructed in the Soviet Union without a world revolution. Bukharin, by now, began arguing for the creation of an autarkic economic model, while Trotsky, in contrast, claimed that the Soviet Union had to participate in the international division of labour to develop. In contrast to Trotsky and Bukharin, Stalin did not believe a world revolution was possible, claiming in 1938 that a world revolution was in fact impossible, and claiming that Engels was wrong on the matter. At the 18th Congress, Stalin took the theory to its inevitable conclusion, claiming that the communist mode of production could be conceived in one country. He rationalised this by claiming that the state could exist in a communist society, as long as the Soviet Union was encircled by capitalism. However, surprisingly, with the establishment of satellite states in Eastern Europe, Stalin claimed that socialism in one country was only possible in a large country like the Soviet Union, and that the other states, in order to survive, had to follow the Soviet line.

== History ==
=== Emergence and early organization ===
As a current of political thought and as a political party, Bolshevism has existed since 1903.

— Vladimir Lenin. "Left-Wing" Communism: An Infantile Disorder.

The concept of Bolshevism arose at the Second Congress of the Russian Social Democratic Labour Party (1903) as a result of the split of the party into two factions: supporters of Lenin and the rest. (Note: Despite the ordinal number adopted in Soviet historiography, the London Congress was actually a constituent one, since the Minsk Congress had no practical significance) One of the main reasons for the split was the question of a party of a new type. In the course of work on the Charter of the Russian Social Democratic Labor Party, Vladimir Lenin and Yuliy Martov proposed two different wordings of the clause on party membership. According to Lenin's wording, a party member is a citizen who recognizes the program and charter, pays membership fees and works in one of the party organizations. Martov suggested limiting the charter to the first two requirements. During the elections to the central organs of the party, the majority was won by supporters of the Leninist formulation, after which Lenin began to call his faction "Bolsheviks", while Martov called his supporters "Mensheviks". Although in the subsequent history of the Russian Social Democratic Labor Party, Lenin's supporters often found themselves in the minority, they were assigned the politically advantageous name "Bolsheviks". (Note: There is an opinion that the adoption of such an unprofitable name of the faction was a major blunder for Martov and, on the contrary: the consolidation of the momentary electoral success in the name of the faction was a strong political move of Lenin.)

As Lenin's biographer Robert Service points out, the division of the newly created party into two factions "plunged Russian Marxists into a state of shock". All but the extreme left Petersburg Marxists disagreed with Lenin's party policy.

At the Fourth Congress of the Russian Social Democratic Labor Party in 1906, the organizational unity of the party was temporarily restored. At the Fifth Congress, the Central Committee was elected, which, due to disagreements between the Bolsheviks and the Mensheviks, turned out to be unworkable, and the Bolshevik Center, headed by Vladimir Lenin, which was created during the Congress by Bolshevik delegates at one of its factional meetings, arbitrarily took over the leadership of the Bolshevik organizations of the party.

At the Sixth (Prague) Conference of the Russian Social Democratic Labor Party, held on January 18–30, 1912, which constituted itself as the all-party conference of the Russian Social Democratic Labor Party and the supreme organ of the party, almost exclusively Lenin's supporters were represented. By this time, the central committee of the party had virtually ceased to exist (its last plenum was held in January 1910), and the party found itself without an official leading center. In this regard, a Bolshevik Central Committee was elected at the Prague Conference.

=== From the First World War onwards ===
Immediately after the outbreak of the World War in 1914, Lenin and his supporters advanced the slogan of the defeat of tsarism in the war and the transformation of the imperialist war into a civil war. It was with this that Lenin's criticism of the so-called "social-chauvinists", who supported their governments in the world war, was connected. Lenin viewed the civil war as "an inevitable continuation, development and intensification of the class struggle".

In 1916, Lenin wrote his work Imperialism as the Highest Stage of Capitalism, which was a major contribution to the development of classical Marxism in the new conditions. In this work the thesis about the unevenness of economic and political development of capitalism in the epoch of imperialism was expressed and theoretically grounded, which leads to the conclusion about the possibility of the victory of socialism initially in a few or in one single country, which is not yet economically developed enough – such as Russia – provided that the head of the revolutionary movement will be a disciplined avant-garde, ready to go all the way to the establishment of the dictatorship of the proletariat.

By the beginning of the February Revolution in 1917, the leading figures of the Bolshevik faction were mainly in exile or in emigration, and therefore the Bolsheviks did not take an organized part in it. The Bolshevik leaders who returned from exile, who, along with the Mensheviks and Socialist Revolutionaries, became members of the Petrograd Soviet, at first tended to cooperate with the Provisional Government. From the very beginning, while still abroad, Lenin insisted on the immediate break of the Petrograd Soviet with the Provisional Government in order to actively prepare for the transition from the bourgeois-democratic to the next, "proletarian" stage of the revolution, the seizure of power and the end of the war. Returning to Russia, he came up with a new program of action for the Bolshevik party – the April Theses – in which he put on the agenda the demand for the transfer of all power to the Soviets in the interests of the proletariat and the poorest peasantry. Faced with resistance even among the representatives of "theoretical", "scientific" Bolshevism, Lenin managed to overcome it, relying on the support of the lower classes – local party organizations, adherents of immediate practical action. In the course of the unfolding controversy about the possibility of socialism in Russia, Lenin rejected all the critical arguments of the Mensheviks, socialist revolutionaries and other political opponents about the country's unpreparedness for a socialist revolution due to its economic backwardness, weakness, lack of culture and organization of the working masses, including the proletariat, about the danger the split of the revolutionary democratic forces and the inevitability of a civil war.

In April 1917, the split of the Russian Social Democratic Labor Party was finalized and the Bolshevik faction became known as the 'Russian Social Democratic Labor Party (Bolsheviks)'. During a heated discussion at the 7th All-Russian (April) Conference of the Russian Social Democratic Labor Party (Bolsheviks) (April 24–29), the April Theses received the support of the majority of delegates from the localities and formed the basis of the policy of the entire party. In March 1918, the Party adopted the name 'Russian Communist Party (Bolsheviks)', (Note: The famous theorist of Marxism Karl Kautsky explained the change in the name of Lenin's party as follows: [The Bolsheviks] destroyed the democracy that the people had conquered in the March revolution. Accordingly, the Bolsheviks ceased to call themselves social democrats, and adopted the name of communists. True, they do not want to completely abandon democracy. Lenin, in his speech on April 28, calls the Soviet organization "the highest type of democracy", "a complete break with its bourgeois caricature". For the proletarian and the poor peasant, complete freedom has now been restored. But democracy is still understood as the equality of political rights for all citizens. The privileged layers have always enjoyed freedom. But this is not called democracy. Quote by: Karl Kautsky. "Dictatorship of the Proletariat") and eventually, in December 1925, the 'All-Union Communist Party (Bolsheviks)'.

There is an opinion that the Bolsheviks strove for revolution, regardless of the political situation and historical realities. This is how the famous Social Democrat Alexander Parvus wrote about the topic in 1918:

The essence of Bolshevism is simple – to ignite the revolution everywhere, not choosing the time, regardless of the political situation and other historical realities. Whoever is against is the enemy, and the conversation with the enemies is short – they are subject to urgent and unconditional destruction.

Bolshevik figures such as Anatoly Lunacharsky, Moisei Uritsky and Dmitry Manuilsky agreed that Lenin’s influence on the Bolshevik party was decisive but the October insurrection was carried out according to Trotsky’s, not to Lenin’s plan.

=== After the Russian Revolution ===
According to sociologist Boris Kagarlitsky, one of the central contradictions of the post-revolutionary policy of the Bolsheviks is defined as a consequence of the historically developed socio-political situation in Russia:

But events did not develop at the will of one person or even one party. Both Lenin himself and his comrades were already hostages of the revolutionary process, which was moving forward according to its own logic. To win in the struggle that had begun, they had to do what they themselves did not expect of themselves, to build a state that only partially met their ideas about what to strive for, but which allowed the revolution to survive and win.

In the 1920s and 1930s, the Left Opposition to Stalin adopted the self-designation "Bolshevik-Leninists", thereby emphasizing its continuity with the revolutionary tradition as opposed to Thermidorian Stalinism. After the political trials of the 1930s, most of the "Leninist Guards" were repressed. Proceeding from this, there is an opinion that Bolshevism as a phenomenon has left the historical scene:

...[Stalin] managed to destroy almost all of Lenin's comrades-in-arms in Russia, becoming by 1928–1939 "the Russian Bonaparte–Robespierre" in the country, "especially double types of cultures of the pre–bourgeois order, that is, the cultures of the bureaucratic, serfdom" (and terrorist – we add), which Lenin feared so much, grew up in the country.

But on the other hand, a number of scholars are of the opinion that Bolshevism has undergone changes over time, and as a phenomenon, it ended only in the early 1990s.

In 1990, at the last, 28th Congress of the Communist Party of the Soviet Union, during the legalization of political platforms within the Communist Party of the Soviet Union, the Bolshevik Platform was formed, giving rise to several modern political parties and social movements.

== Supporters and opponents ==
=== Among the people ===
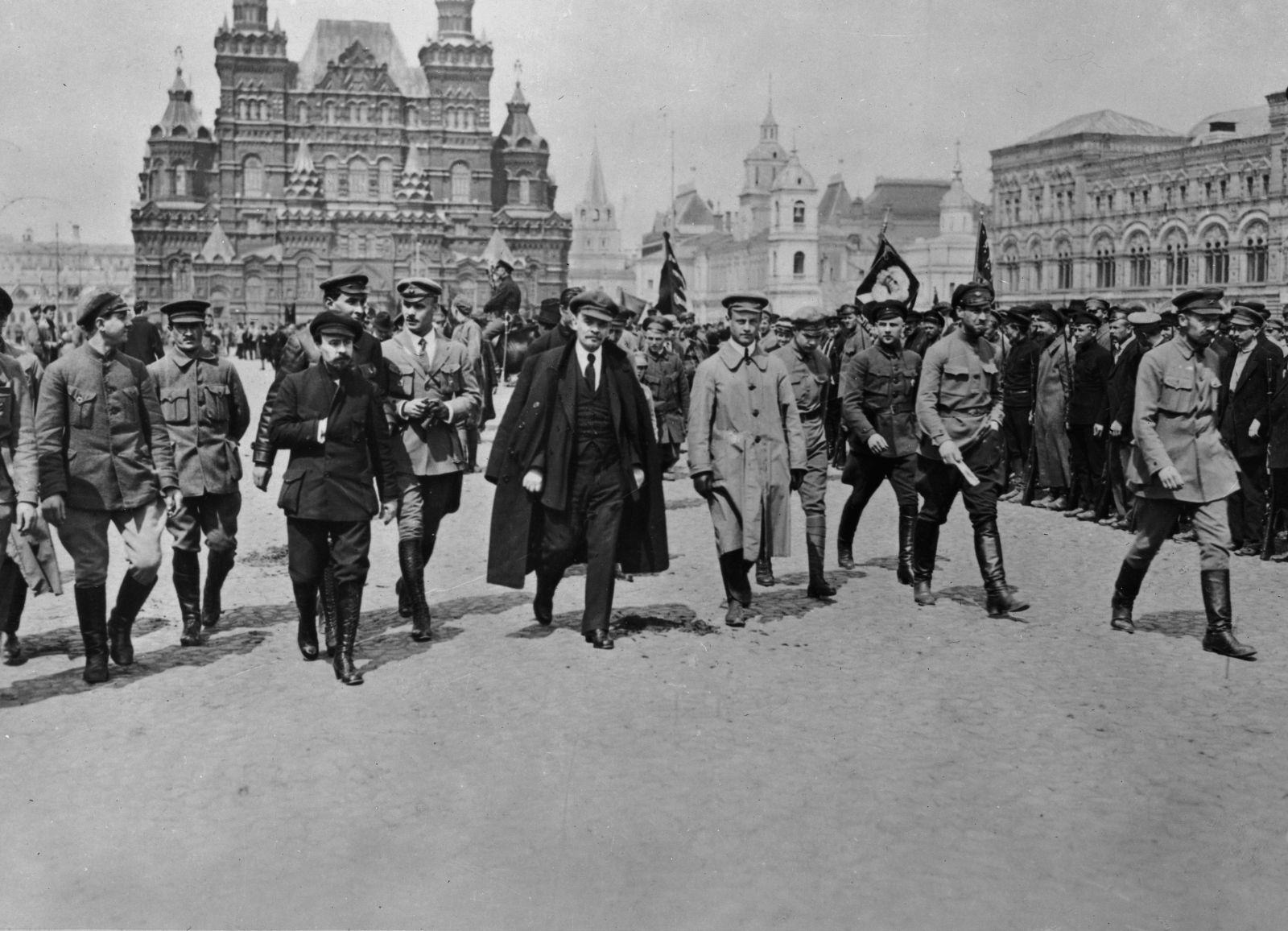
Lenin at the Red Square, 1919

According to the British historian Orlando Figes, the opinion that the Bolsheviks were raised to the top of power by massive popular support for their party is not true and is a delusion. According to Figes, the October Uprising in Petrograd was a coup d'état supported by only a small part of the population. Figes explains the success of the Bolsheviks by the fact that the latter were the only political party that uncompromisingly advocated the slogan "all power to the Soviets", which gained great popularity in 1917 after the unsuccessful Revolt of General Kornilov. As Figes points out, in the fall of 1917, there was a stream of resolutions from factories, from villages, from army units, calling for the formation of a Soviet government. At the same time, the authors of the resolutions understood "the power of the Soviets" as the All-Russian Council with the participation of all socialist parties.

Meanwhile, the commitment of the Bolsheviks to the principle of Soviet power was not at all so unconditional. In July 1917, when the Bolshevik Party was unable to obtain a majority in the Soviets of Workers' and Soldiers' Deputies, it "temporarily removed" the slogan "all Power to the Soviets!". After the October coup, during the so-called "triumphal march of Soviet power" in those cases when individual Soviets did not agree to become the organs of the dictatorship of the Russian Social-Democratic Workers' Party (Bolsheviks), the Bolsheviks did not hesitate to disperse them and replace them by emergency bodies – revolutionary committees, military revolutionary committees, etc.

Alexander Parvus wrote in 1918:

The present Soviets terrorize not only the reactionaries and capitalists, but also the democratically inclined bourgeoisie and even all socialist workers' organizations that disagree with their opinion. They dispersed the Constituent Assembly and are holding on, having lost their moral authority in the eyes of the masses, exclusively with bayonets.

=== Contemproary international reception ===
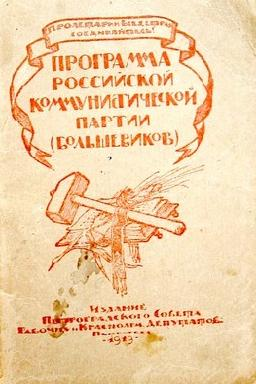
Program of the Russian Communist Party (Bolsheviks), 1919

The Bolsheviks were supported, although not without criticism of their political practice, by left-wing theorists in Europe, such as Rosa Luxemburg and Karl Liebknecht.

At the same time, this political trend was rejected by the centrist social democrats, for example, Karl Kautsky and the extreme left supporters of "workers' council communism", for example, Otto Rühle and Antonie Pannekoek. The answer to the extreme leftist criticism was given by Lenin in the brochure Childhood Illness of "Leftism" in Communism, in turn Antonie Pannekoek answered to Vladimir Lenin in the work World Revolution and Communist Tactics.

=== Later analysis ===
In journalism, some authors understand 'Bolshevism' as a synonym for extreme extremism, ideological fanaticism, intolerance, and a propensity for violence. In Western political science, some authors analyze Bolshevism from the standpoint of similarities and differences with fascism and Nazism. Some modern scholars agree that Bolshevism:

...was a desperate attempt to escape from the world of the bourgeois and philistine. (This, incidentally, refutes the assertion that Bolshevism is equated with fascism. Fascism, unlike Bolshevism, was based on philistinism – its flesh and spirit).

== See also ==
- Left Socialist-Revolutionaries
- Jewish Bolshevism

== Sources ==
- Berdyaev, Nikolay. The Origins and Meaning of Russian Communism. Moscow, 1990
- Brenton, Anthony (2017). Historical Inevitability? Key Events of the Russian Revolution (Collection of Articles). Moscow: Alpina Non-Fiction. ISBN 978-5-91671-757-0.
- Evans, Alfred (1993). Soviet Marxism–Leninism: The Decline of an Ideology. ABC-CLIO. ISBN 978-0-275-94763-7.
- Felshtinsky, Yuri (2008). Leaders In the Law. Moscow: Terra. ISBN 978-5-275-01878-3.
- Harding, Neil (1996). Leninism. Macmillan Publishers. ISBN 978-0-333-66482-7.
- McDonough, Terrence (1995). "Lenin, Imperialism, and the Stages of Capitalist Development". Science & Society. Vol. 59, no. 3. Guilford Press. pp. 339–367. JSTOR 40403507.
- Mises, Ludwig von. Socialism. Economic And Sociological Analysis – Moscow: "Catallaxy", 1994 – Page 416 – ISBN 5-86366-022-8
- Nikolaevsky, Boris (1995). Secret Pages of History. Humanitarian Literature Publishing House. ISBN 5-87121-007-4.
- Osipov, Yury (2004–2017). Bolsheviks. Great Russian Encyclopedia: In 35 Volumes. Moscow: Great Russian Encyclopedia. Archived from the original on October 6, 2021.
- Parvus, Alexander (2017). In the Fight For the Truth. Moscow: Alpina Publisher. ISBN 978-5-9614-6465-8.
- Plimak, Evgeny (2004). Transitional Politics. Lenin's Experience. Moscow: The Whole World. ISBN 5-7777-0298-8.
- Ree, Erik van (2003). The Political Thought of Joseph Stalin. doi:10.4324/9780203221631. ISBN 978-1-135-78605-2.
- Russell, Bertrand. The Practice and Theory of Bolshevism / [Author's Epilogue by V. S. Markov; Academy of Sciences of the Soviet Union, Scientific Council "History of Revolutions and Social Movements"] – Moscow: Science, 1991
- Service, Robert (2002). Lenin. Biography. Translated by G. I. Levitan. Moscow: Potpourri. ISBN 985-438-591-4.
- Zevelev, Alexander; Sviridenko, Yuri; Shelokhaev, Valentin (2000). "Chapter 12. Bolsheviks". Political Parties of Russia: History and Modernity. Moscow: Russian Political Encyclopedia. ISBN 5-8243-0068-2. Archived from the original on April 2, 2015.
