= Stalin: A Biography =

2004 biographical book by Robert Service

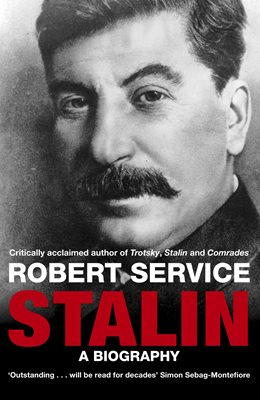
- Author: Robert Service
- Language: English
- Subject: Biography
- Publisher: Macmillan
- Publication date: 2004
- Publication place: United Kingdom
- Media type: Print (hardback & paperback)
- Pages: 715
- Preceded by: Lenin: A Biography
- Followed by: Trotsky: A Biography

Stalin: A Biography is a biography of Joseph Stalin written by Robert Service. It was published in 2004.

For his research, Service traveled to Abkhazia, where Stalin's dacha was located during the 1930s in the Soviet Union during the Stalinist Era after the end of the Leninist Era.

The book describes Stalin's life, covering in detail his youth (1878-1923), rise to power (1924-1927/1930), and rule (1927-1953). According to the publisher, it uses a personal style that "humanizes Stalin without ever diminishing the extent of the atrocities he unleashed upon the Soviet population."

== Critical reception ==
Stalin: A Biography has been criticized by historians including Gerald Meyer, claiming Service flattened Stalin’s character into that of a "power-mad psychopath.”

== See also ==
- Anti-Stalinist Left
- Criticism of Marxism-Leninism
- Hoover Institution
- Lenin: A Biography
- Trotsky: A Biography
- The Stalinist Legacy
- Stalinism
