= Thomas W. Gilligan =

American economist (born 1954)

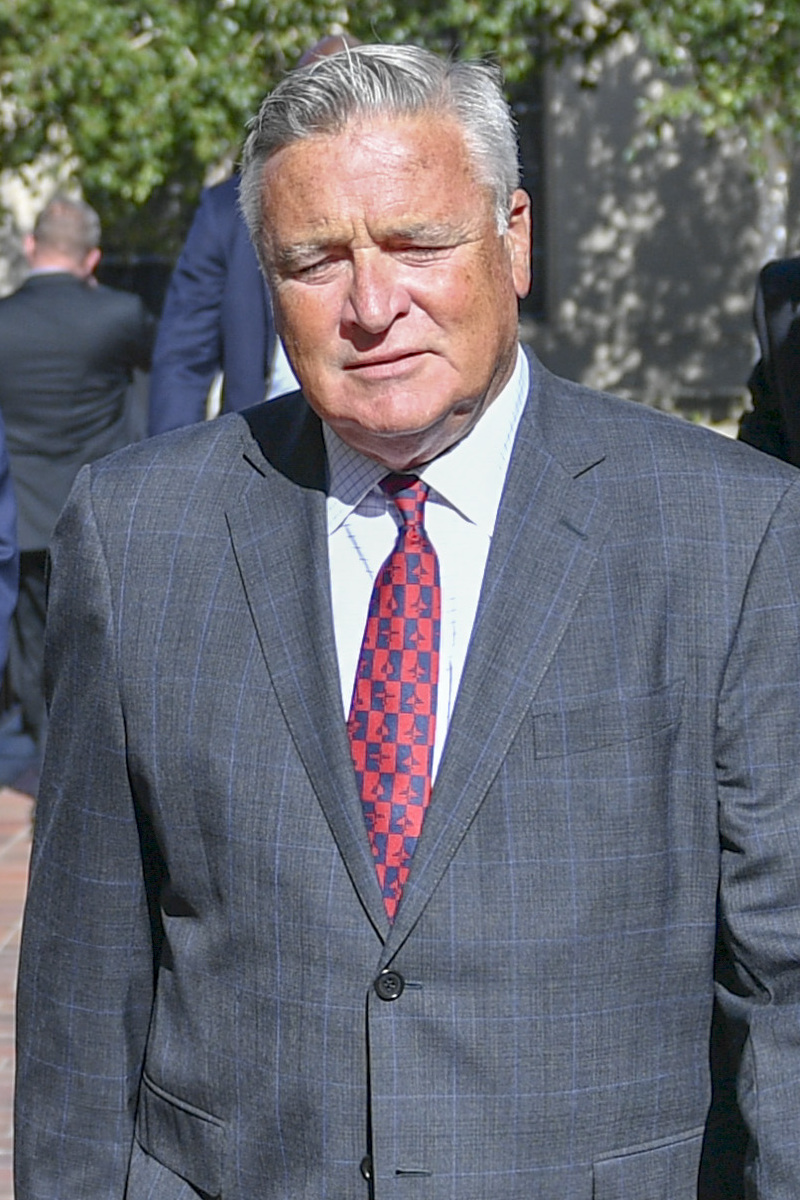
- Gilligan in 2018

7th Director of the Hoover Institution
- In office September 1, 2015 – September 1, 2020
- Preceded by: John Raisian
- Succeeded by: Condoleezza Rice

Personal details
- Born: August 21, 1954 (age 71) San Diego, California, U.S.
- Education: University of Oklahoma (BA); Washington University (MA, PhD)

Thomas W. Gilligan (born August 21, 1954) is an American economist who was the Tad and Dianne Taube Director of the Hoover Institution at Stanford University from 2015 to 2020. Prior to taking over as head of the Stanford-based think tank, he served as dean of the McCombs School of Business at The University of Texas at Austin. Gilligan previously held a variety of positions at the University of Southern California from 1987 until 2008.

== Early life and education ==
Thomas W. Gilligan was born in San Diego, California, and spent his childhood years moving from base to base along the West Coast and Hawaii. In his teens, Gilligan's family moved to Oklahoma, where he completed high school. After high school, Gilligan joined the United States Air Force where after 10 months of learning the Russian language, Gilligan intercepted communications while flying reconnaissance missions over the Soviet Union. After four-years in the Air Force, Gilligan enrolled and graduated in three years from the University of Oklahoma After graduation, Gilligan attended graduate school at Washington University in St. Louis on a fellowship program. Before completing his PhD under Barry R. Weingast at Washington University, Gilligan was a staff economist on the Council of Economic Advisers under President Ronald Reagan from 1982–1983.

Gilligan is married to Christie Skinner. The couple has three children.

== Teaching career ==
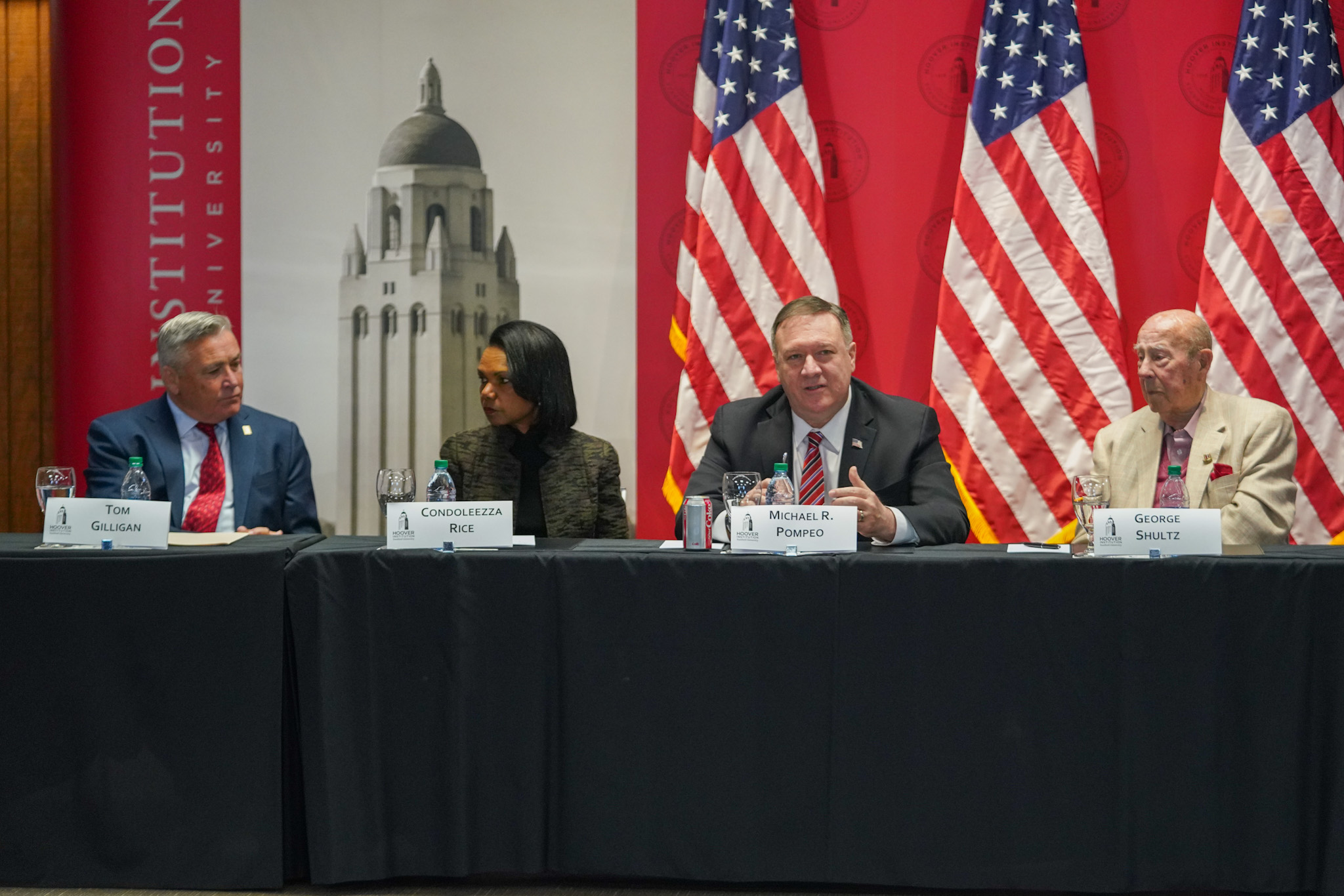
Gilligan (far left) participates in a discussion with fellow Secretaries of State at the Hoover Institution in 2019

After graduation from Washington University, Gilligan was Assistant Professor of Economics and taught undergraduate and PhD level courses in economics and political economy at the California Institute of Technology until 1987. For the next two decades, Gilligan taught a variety of courses and held multiple positions at the Marshall School of Business of the University of Southern California until becoming dean at the McCombs School of Business. At the Marshall School, Gilligan was the interim dean for over a year from February 2006 until James G. Ellis replaced him in April 2007. Also, Gilligan was a visiting professor from the late-1980s until the mid-1990s at the Stanford Graduate School of Business and Kellogg School of Management.

=== McCombs School of Business ===
After a nationwide search, Gilligan was appointed dean of the McCombs School of Business at The University of Texas at Austin in 2008. Gilligan followed George W. Gau after six years in the previous position.

=== The Hoover Institution ===
Thomas Gilligan began his tenure as the director of the Hoover Institution in September 2015. Gilligan stepped down from the position in September 2020.

== Business career ==
Gilligan served on the board of directors of Southwest Airlines until 2018.

Non-profit organization positions
Preceded by John Raisian	Director of the Hoover Institution; 2015–2020	Succeeded by Condoleezza Rice
