= Bertrand Patenaude =

American historian (born 1956)

Bertrand M. Patenaude (born 1956) is an American historian who works as a research fellow at the Hoover Institution and lecturer at Stanford University. He lectures on history and international relations at Stanford with a focus on the politics and history of Russia and modern Europe.

== Early life and education ==
Patenaude was born in 1956. He was educated at Boston College, from which he received his B.A. degree. He later studied as a graduate student at the University of Vienna from 1977 to 1978, received his M.A. degree from Stanford in 1979, and his Ph.D. in history from Stanford in 1987.

== Career and publications ==
From 1992 to 2000, Patenaude taught in the national security affairs department of the Naval Postgraduate School. At the school, he was awarded the Schieffelin Award for Teaching Excellence two years in a row. He reviews books for mass-market and scholarly publications, including The Wall Street Journal newspaper. Patenaude and historian Robert Service have reviewed each other's works in the scholarly literature; both have published biographies on Leon Trotsky. Patenaude has also engaged in published academic polemics with scholar Lars T. Lih on the topic of war communism.

Patenaude's first book, The Big Show in Bololand: The American Relief Expedition to Soviet Russia in the Famine of 1921, was published by Stanford University Press in 2002. Patenaude has published widely on Trotsky, including books Trotsky: Downfall of a Revolutionary, released by HarperCollins in 2010, and Stalin's Nemesis: The Exile and Murder of Leon Trotsky, published the same year by Faber & Faber. A book by Patenaude on the Soviet famine of 1921, Bread + Medicine: American Famine Relief in Soviet Russia, 1921–1923, was published by the Hoover Institution Press in 2023. He also gave an online presentation on American relief given during the famine to the Russian History Museum in Jordanville, New York. Patenaude made the Bread + Medicine project a part of his class on early Soviet Russia, assigning students to look through historical materials collected at the Hoover Institution Library and Archives.

In 2022, Patenaude curated an exhibit at the Hoover Institution on the 1921 Soviet famine. He was also a panelist at a 2023 film screening on the same topic. At Stanford, his lecturing includes courses on history, international relations, and human rights, including teaching recurring course "The U.S., U.N. Peacekeeping, and Humanitarian War" on American and United Nations involvement in humanitarian interventions. He also serves as a faculty fellow at Stanford's Center for Innovation in Global Health and a lecturer in the Center for Biomedical Ethics. He has additionally lectured for Lindblad and National Geographic Society expeditions, as well as for the Smithsonian Institution's Smithsonian Journeys.
