= Market-preserving federalism =

Market-preserving federalism is a special type of federalism that limits the degree to which a country's political system can encroach upon its markets. Weingast notes that there is a fundamental dilemma facing a government attempting to build and protect markets: the government must be strong enough to protect property rights and enforce contracts, but weak enough to credibly commit the state to honoring such rules.

Market-preserving federalism is a means by which some countries address the fundamental dilemma of government. By decentralizing the authority to make economic policies, market-preserving federalism reduces the ability of both the central government to act arbitrarily (it has given up these powers) and the subnational governments (they face competition with one another for scarce capital and labor).

Montinola, Qian, and Weingast argue that this form of federalism was critical for the success of China's reforms in the early 1980s.

== Conditions for market-preserving federalism ==
Montinola, Qian, and Weingast identify a set of five conditions that represent an ideal type of institutional arrangement for market-preserving federalism (italics in original).

(F1) There exists a hierarchy of governments with a delineated scope of authority (for example, between the national and subnational governments) so that each government is autonomous in its own sphere of authority.

(F2) The subnational governments have primary authority over the economy within their jurisdictions.

(F3) The national government has the authority to police the common market and to ensure the mobility of goods and factors across subgovernmental jurisdictions.

(F4) Revenue sharing among governments is limited and borrowing by governments is constrained so that all governments face hard budget constraints.

(F5) The allocation of authority and responsibility has an institutionalized degree of durability so that it cannot be altered by the national government either unilaterally or under the pressures from subnational governments.

While condition F1 is the defining feature of federalism, conditions two through five are required to ensure federalism's market-preserving qualities. Federal systems that fail to satisfy these five conditions generally do not sustain markets and economic development; for example, Argentina, India, and Mexico.

== See also ==
- Protectionism
