= Lenin: A Biography =

2000 non-fiction book by Robert Service

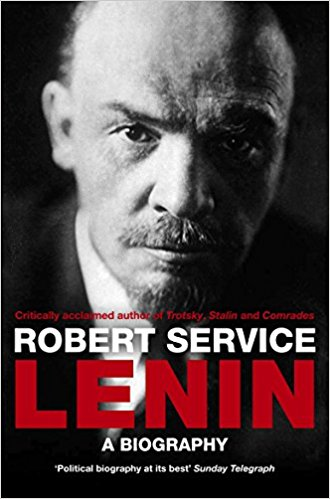
- The first edition cover of the book, depicting Lenin.
- Author: Robert Service
- Language: English
- Subject: Biography
- Publisher: Macmillan Publishers
- Publication date: 2000
- Publication place: United Kingdom
- Media type: Print (hardback & paperback)
- Pages: 561
- Followed by: Stalin: A Biography

Lenin: A Biography is a biography of the Marxist theorist and revolutionary Vladimir Lenin written by the English historian Robert Service, then a professor in Russian History at the University of Oxford. It was first published by Macmillan in 2000 and later republished in other languages.

== Reviews ==
Writing in The New York Review of Books, Martin Malia described Service's book as the "best place to begin assessing Bolshevism's founder".

In The Tribune, Bhupinder Singh praised Service's ability to avoid the "extreme conclusions" regarding Lenin and the Russian Revolution that have been made by the historians and biographers Dmitri Volkogonov, Edvard Radzinsky, Orlando Figes, and Richard Pipes. Singh noted that Service nevertheless tried to emphasise "the negative aspects of Lenin", having no sympathies with the far left. He asserts that there was little new information here that had not appeared in prior biographies, with the exception of some data on the influence of agrarian socialists on Lenin's thought and the description of how some of Lenin's edicts aided the development of a totalitarian state. He nevertheless believed that Service was wrong to see Stalinism as "a direct and legitimate continuation" of Leninism, instead highlighting ways in which Stalin's policies differed from those of Lenin.

Writing in the International Socialist Review, the American historian Paul Le Blanc commented that Lenin: A Biography expressed "a tone of unrelenting hostility" to Lenin, commenting on its "flippant editorializing and personal denigration (buttressed by superficial references to evidence)", in this way contrasting it to Service's earlier three-volume biography of Lenin, which Le Blanc deemed to be more balanced. Writing for the Australian Green Left Weekly, Phil Shannon described Service's book as "an ideological weapon in the conservative crusade against socialist revolution." He criticised Service's assertion that Stalinist totalitarianism had its basis in Leninism, ultimately deriding the book as "rotten politics, poor history and bad biography."

== See also ==
- Criticism of communist party rule
- Hoover Institution
- Stalin: A Biography
- The Stalinist Legacy
