= Chiang Fang Chih-yi =

Taiwanese politician

Chiang Fang Chih-yi (Chinese: 蔣方智怡; pinyin: Jiǎng Fāng Zhìyí, born in 1949) is a Taiwanese boardmember of the Chinese Culture University, and a former member of the Kuomintang Central Standing Committee.

== Biography ==
Fang Chih-yi was born in Kaohsiung, Taiwan, though she originated from Hangzhou, China. In 1973, she married to Chiang Hsiao-yung, the third son of former President Chiang Ching-kuo, thus entering the Chiang family, and taking in her husband's name to become Chiang Fang Chih-yi.

While Fang Chih-yi studied in Shih Hsin University, she worked as a programmer at IBM, and later contributed her code to the Ministry of Finance.

In 1996, after her husband passed away, the diaries of Chiang Kai-shek and Chiang Ching-kuo were preserved by her, and she later decided to deposit them in December 2004 to the Hoover Institution Library and Archives, with the family retaining the right to retrieve them at any time.
