= Daniel Kessler =

Daniel Kessler may refer to:

- Daniel Kessler (guitarist) (born 1974), musician
- Daniel P. Kessler, Health policy and finance expert, professor at Stanford University and columnist for The Wall Street Journal
