= Frank A. Golder =

American historian (1877–1929)

Frank Alfred Golder (August 11, 1877 – January 7, 1929) was an American historian and archivist specializing in the history of Russia. Golder is best remembered for his work in the early 1920s building the seminal collection of Slavic language materials residing today at the Hoover Institution Library and Archives at Stanford University in California.

== Biography ==
=== Early years ===
Golder spent two years teaching school on remote Unga Island, largest of Alaska's Shumagin Islands.

Golder was born August 11, 1877, near Odessa, Ukraine, then part of the Russian Empire. His family, who were ethnic Jews, emigrated to the United States during Golder's early boyhood years, probably in the immediate aftermath of the Odessa Pogrom of 1881. Golder was not a native speaker of either Russian or Ukrainian but is believed to have rather first spoken Yiddish before he learned English in America as a youth.

The Golder family established a home in Bridgeton, New Jersey, where they lived in poverty. Frank was sent to the streets as a young boy to supplement the family income as a peddler of small knickknacks. It was in this way that he was befriended by a Baptist clergyman, who helped the boy escape life on the streets and to gain a first-rate education, including a stint at Georgetown College, a preparatory school in Kentucky.

Golder subsequently converted to Unitarianism, a theological departure which caused a strain between him and his parents, who remained adherents of Judaism.

Upon completion of prep school, Golder enrolled in Bucknell University in Lewisburg, Pennsylvania, a liberal arts college from which he graduated with a Bachelor's degree in 1898, having completed the requisite two-year program.

Following graduation Golder moved to Philadelphia, to which his parents had recently located. Although he had sufficient academic qualification to teach school in the city, Golder did not find life in Philadelphia to his liking, so in July 1899 he applied through the U.S. Department of the Interior for a teaching position in Alaska. Golder was accepted for a position and in August of that same year he boarded a train to begin the 5,000-mile trek to a remote settlement Unga Island to teach the native Aleuts in a public school established there. Golder remained at Unga Island until 1902. The experience helped foster in Golder a lifelong interest in the history of Alaska and would also be the source of material for his first book, a collection of folklore entitled Tales from Kodiak Island.

Golder left Alaska to enroll at Harvard University, from which he received a second bachelor's degree in 1903 before beginning doctoral studies in history at that same institution. In the course of his graduate work Golder traveled to Paris and Berlin, where he developed an affinity for the history of Russia, an area of specialization that was infrequently taught in the United States. Golder combined his interests in Alaska and the Russian Empire in his dissertation work, which related to the Russian Empire's expansion in the Pacific. Golder received his Ph.D. from Harvard in 1909 and his dissertation was published in book form in 1914, bearing the title Russian Expansion on the Pacific, 1641-1850.

=== Academic career ===
Following the defense of his dissertation, Golder worked at two brief college teaching jobs as an instructor at Boston University and the University of Chicago in 1909 and 1910. That led to a tenure-track appointment as assistant professor in the Department of Economics and History at Washington State College, located in the small Eastern Washington town of Pullman. Golder remained there for a decade, albeit marked by long absences, gaining the academic rank of professor during that interval.

Golder sought to conduct research in Russia to compile a bibliography of historical works in libraries and archives there. To this end, Golder made the acquaintance of historian J. Franklin Jameson of the Carnegie Institution, who agreed to send Golder there on such a research mission.

Golder arrived in St. Petersburg in February 1914 and remained there until November, an interval which placed him at ground zero to witness firsthand the declaration of World War I that summer. Despite the massive distraction and the wartime disorganization of Russian society, Golder nevertheless managed to complete his research mission, producing a bibliographic guide which eventually saw print in 1917 as Guide to Materials for American History in Russian Archives. Golder also managed to turn some of the historical knowledge which he gained in the process into articles in several of the leading academic journals of the day, helping cement his reputation as an expert in 18th and 19th Century Russian diplomatic history.

Coincidentally, Golder would again find himself at the center of the world-historical tornado during his second research trip to Russia, conducted in 1917. This time, Golder traveled on behalf of the American Geographic Society, which commissioned him to translate and edit the journals of the Danish-born Russian explorer Vitus Bering for publication. Golder arrived to peruse the Bering papers in Petrograd (the past and future St. Petersburg) on March 4, 1917 — mere days before the eruption of the February Revolution which would rapidly bring an end to the Romanov dynasty and usher in the rise of a short-lived constitutional democracy. Golder once more somehow managed to stick to the academic task at hand despite chaos during his 1917 research visit, and the two volumes of Bering's Voyages would appear in print in 1922 and 1925.

Golder's Russian experiences made him a valuable asset to the administration of President Woodrow Wilson, and he was named to a committee of experts assembled late in 1917 to compile background information for a forthcoming peace conference. The committee, known as "The Inquiry" and headed by Wilson's close personal advisor Colonel Edward M. House, would remain active for two years, and Golder authored reports on Ukraine, Lithuania, Poland, and two regions of Russia.

Since Golder was not selected to travel to Europe as an expert at the Paris Peace Conference, upon completion of the committee's activities he returned to Pullman to resume teaching at Washington State.

=== Hoover Library curator ===
The year 1920 found Frank Golder teaching summer classes at Stanford University, near Palo Alto, California. That put the Russian expert Golder in the right place at the right time, as American Food Administrator and confirmed bibliophile Herbert Hoover had decided to transfer the mass of documents he had gathered during the wartime years to Stanford, his alma mater, as an archival collection.

Golder was quickly hired as curator of the Hoover War History Collection, a group of materials which formed the initial basis for the collection of the Hoover Institution and Archives on War, Revolution and Peace at Stanford University. Golder departed for Soviet Russia on his first collecting trip in August 1920, an adventure that lasted three years and which resulted in the building of one of the seminal collections of Slavic books, posters, magazines, and government documents. Great masses of material, some unique and ephemeral, were gathered by Golder from various locations throughout Europe, crated, and shipped back for archival storage in California.

=== Death and legacy ===
Frank Golder died in 1929. He never married but was survived by his younger brother Benjamin M. Golder, who sat as a Republican Congressman from Pennsylvania at the time of his death.

The main accumulation of Golder's papers are housed at the Hoover Institution Library and Archives at Stanford University in 43 archival boxes, including diaries which were extracted by historians Terence Emmons and Bertrand M. Patenaude for the publication of a book in 1992 entitled War, Revolution, and Peace in Russia: The Passages of Frank Golder, 1914-1927. A second smaller collection is housed at Green Library on the Stanford campus.

== Works ==
- Tales from Kodiak Island. Boston: Houghton, Mifflin and Co., 1903.
- Russian Expansion on the Pacific, 1641–1850. Cleveland, OH: Arthur H. Clark Co., 1914.
- "Catherine II and the American Revolution," American Historical Review, vol. 21, no. 1 (1915), pp. 92–96.
- Guide to Materials for American History in Russian Archives. New York: Carnegie Institution, 1917.
- Bering's Voyages: An Account of the Efforts of the Russians to Determine the Relation of Asia and America. In two volumes, with Leonhard Stejneger. New York: American Geographical Society, 1922–1925.
- Documents of Russian history, 1914–1917. (Editor.) Gloucester, MA: Smith, 1927.
- The March of the Mormon battalion from Council Bluffs to California: Taken from the Journal of Henry Standage. New York: The Century Co., 1928.
