= Tanner Fountain =

Fountain in Stanford, California, U.S.

Coordinates: 37.42834°N 122.166749°W

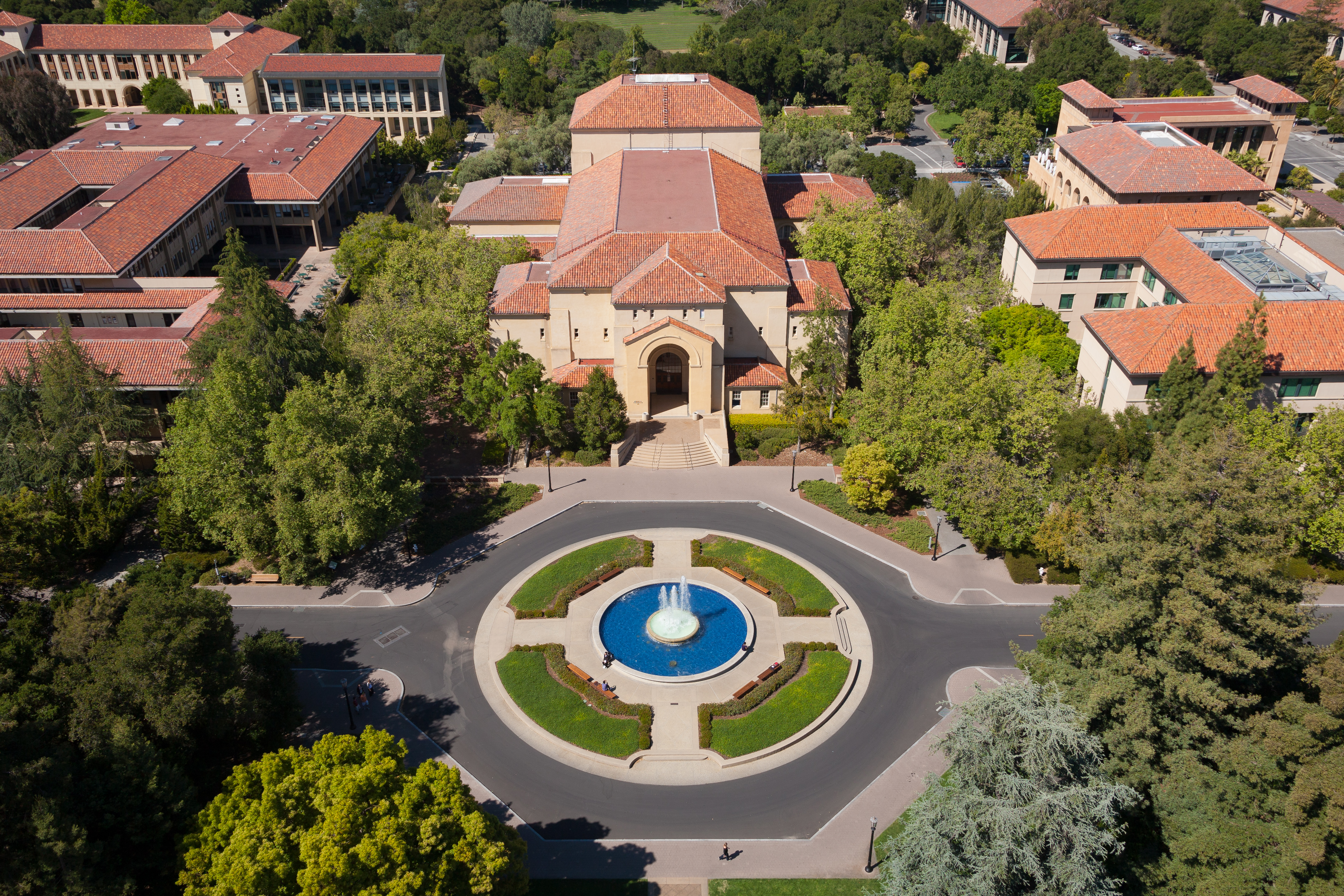
Aerial view of the fountain, 2011

Tanner Fountain is a fountain on the Stanford University campus in Stanford, California, United States. Located between Hoover Tower and Memorial Auditorium, the fountain was installed in 1977, having been donated by Obert Tanner and his wife to commemorate their son. The couple had been planning to fund the project since 1972, and installation and landscaping cost less than $250,000.
