= James G. Ellis =

American academic

James George Ellis (born 9 Jan 1947 Tacoma, Washington) is an American academic, professor, and former business executive who, for the last nineteen years, was the dean of the Marshall School of Business at the University of Southern California in Los Angeles, California.

== Early life and education ==
Ellis spent his early years in California. When Ellis was thirteen (1960), his family moved to Albuquerque, New Mexico, where his father, George James Ellis (1921–2003), served as an executive for a bank; then in 1962, he co-founded the American Bank of Commerce in Albuquerque. In Albuquerque, Ellis attended Jefferson Middle School and Highland High School, graduating in 1964. He earned a Bachelor of Business Administration in 1968 from the University of New Mexico, where he served on the board of the university's fund-raising foundation. Ellis earned an MBA in 1970 from Harvard.

Ellis has been married to Gail Ellis, Psy.D. (formerly Sullivan, née Galvin), a clinical psychologist, since 1985. Dr. Ellis is the daughter of longtime CEO of Motorola, Robert W. Galvin, granddaughter of the founder, Paul Vincent Galvin, and sister of third family generation CEO, Christopher Galvin. The couple resides in San Marino, California, and have five children, all adult age.

== Career ==
Ellis is an expert on global commerce, a successful business executive and prominent civic leader in the Los Angeles area.

Ellis was named USC Marshall dean and holder of the Robert R. Dockson Dean's Chair in Business Administration on April 4, 2007, succeeding interim Dean Thomas W. Gilligan, who returned to his position as a USC Marshall professor of finance and business economics.

As dean of USC Marshall, Ellis oversees business-education programs that annually serve more than 5,600 undergraduate, graduate, professional, doctoral and executive-education students. The school teaches about a quarter of all USC undergraduates.

Most recently, Ellis served as USC's Vice Provost of Globalization, a position he held for 16 months. In that position, he developed a university-wide initiative encompassing international instructional and research programs, managing USC overseas offices and coordinating visits by foreign dignitaries.

He had been USC Marshall's vice dean of external relations and spent a decade as a clinical professor in USC Marshall's Marketing Department, where he applied his expertise in commerce issues facing several Pacific Rim countries. In addition to his administrative endeavors, Ellis also taught upper-division courses in the Marketing department and the Freshman Honors Colloquium, a course designed to introduce incoming "business scholars" to highly successful leaders in a variety of fields. Ellis has received numerous teaching awards from student, alumni and other organizations.

Ellis had a lengthy career in the business world before joining academia, working in senior management or director positions with Broadway Department Stores, American Porsche Design, Miller's Outpost, and several other companies.

He has served on the boards of directors of such corporate and non-profit organizations as the Young Presidents' Organization, Kidspace Children Museum, Pasadena Chamber of Commerce, Chief Executives Organization and World Presidents' Organization.

Academic offices
Preceded by Thomas W. Gilligan	Marshall School of Business Dean; 2007-	Succeeded by Geoffrey Garrett
