= Robert Service (historian) =

British historian and biographer (born 1947)

Robert Service FBA
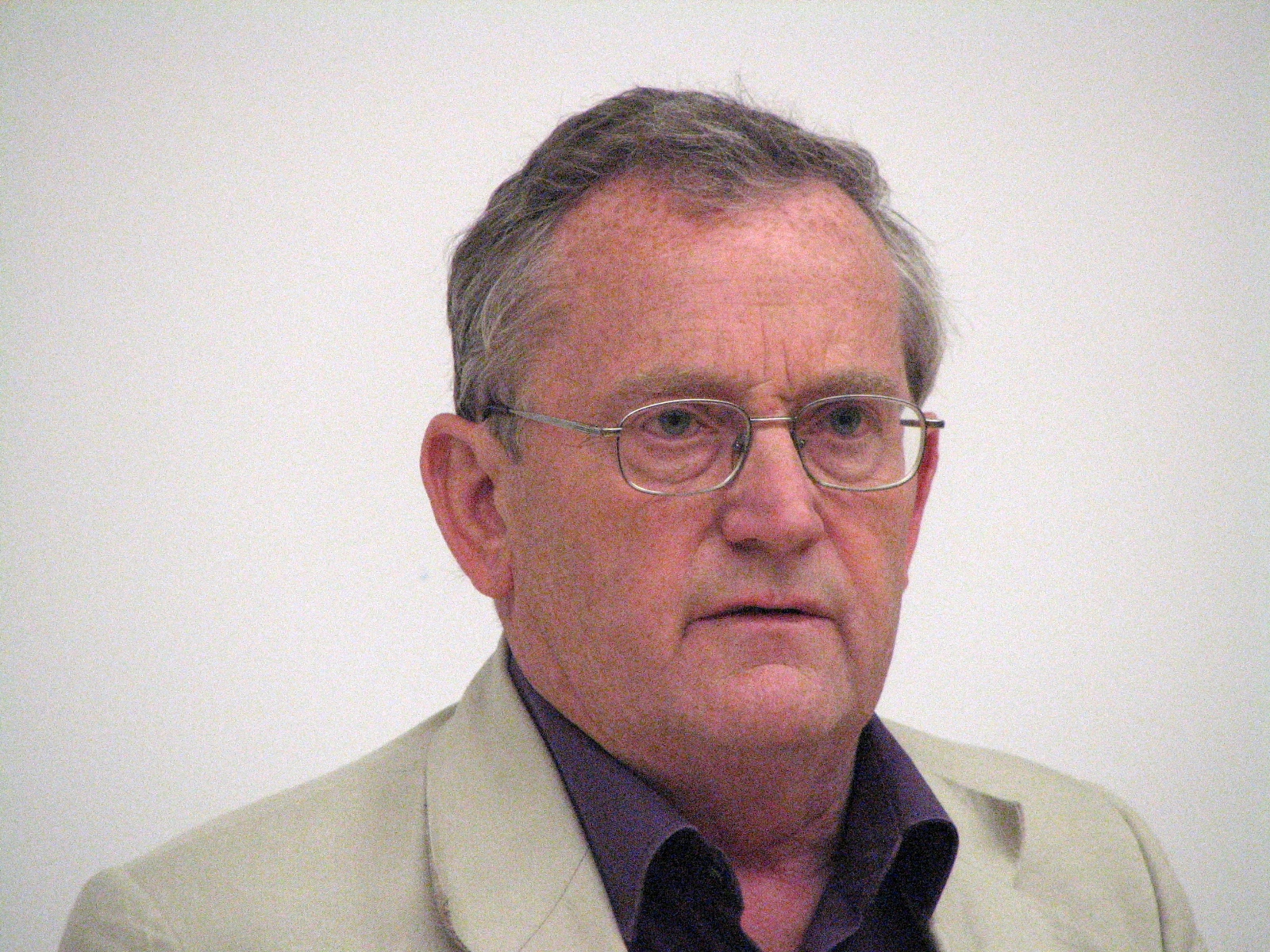
- Service speaking at the Tallinn Literature Festival HeadRead in May 2011
- Born: 29 October 1947 (age 79)
- Awards: Duff Cooper Prize (2009)

Academic background
- Education: King's College, Cambridge; University of Essex; Saint Petersburg State University

Academic work
- Institutions: University of Oxford
- Main interests: Russian history (1894–)
- Notable works: Biographies of Vladimir Lenin, Joseph Stalin, and Leon Trotsky

Robert John Service (born 29 October 1947) is a British post-revisionist historian, academic and author who has written extensively on the history of the Soviet Union, particularly the period from the October Revolution in 1917 to the death of Joseph Stalin in 1953. He has written biographies of Vladimir Lenin, Stalin and Leon Trotsky.

Until 2013 he was a professor of Russian history at the University of Oxford, a fellow of St Antony's College, Oxford, and a senior fellow at Stanford University's Hoover Institution. He has been a fellow of the British Academy since 1998.

== Career and reception ==
Service studied Russian and classical Greek at King's College, Cambridge, and attended the University of Essex and Saint Petersburg State University for his postgraduate work. He taught at Keele and the School of Slavonic and East European Studies, before joining the University of Oxford in 1998.

Between 1986 and 1995 Service published a three-volume biography of Vladimir Lenin. He wrote several works of general history on 20th-century Russia, including A History of Twentieth-Century Russia. He published biographies on the most important Bolshevik leaders: Lenin (2000), Stalin (2004), and Trotsky (2009).

The latter won the Duff Cooper Prize in 2009. Suhrkamp Verlag announced in February 2012 that it would publish a German translation. It was strongly criticised by Service's Hoover Institution colleague Bertrand Patenaude in a review for the American Historical Review, asserting that it contained numerous errors and distortions.

== Works ==
External videos
- Presentation by Service on Stalin: A Biography, April 29, 2005, C-SPAN
- Q&A interview with Service on Trotsky: A Biography, July 18, 2010, C-SPAN
- Presentation by Service on The End of the Cold War: 1985-1991, July 29, 2015, C-SPAN

- The Bolshevik Party in Revolution: A Study in Organisational Change 1917–1923 (1979)
- Lenin: A Political Life (in three volumes: 1985, 1991 and 1995)
- A History of Twentieth-Century Russia (1997)
- The Penguin History of Modern Russia From Tsarism to the 21st Century (1997)
- A History of Modern Russia, from Nicholas II to Putin (1998, Second edition in 2003)
- The Russian Revolution, 1900–27 (Studies in European History) (1999)
- Lenin: A Biography (2000)
- Russia: Experiment with a People (2002)
- Stalin: A Biography (2004), Oxford, 715 pages ill. ISBN 0-330-41913-7 (2004)
- Comrades: A World History of Communism (2007)
- Trotsky: A Biography (2009)
- Spies and Commissars: Bolshevik Russia and the West (2011)
- The End of the Cold War: 1985–1991 (2015)
- The Last of the Tsars: Nicholas II and the Russian Revolution (2017)
- Russia and Its Islamic World (2017)
- Kremlin Winter: Russia and the Second Coming of Vladimir Putin (2019)
- Blood on the Snow: The Russian Revolution 1914-1924 (2023)
- The August Coup: The Destruction of the Soviet Union and the Making of a New Russia 1985-1991 (2026)
