= Leninism: Introduction to the Study of Leninism =

1925 book by Zinoviev

- Author: Grigory Zinoviev
- Original title: Ленинизм: введение в изучение ленинизма
- Language: Russian
- Publication date: October 1925
- Publication place: Soviet Union
- Media type: Print

Leninism: Introduction to the Study of Leninism (Russian: Leninizm: Vvedenie v izuchenie Leninizma) is a 1925 work by Soviet politician Grigory Zinoviev. The work represents a primary document to the ideological tensions that were building within the Politburo, Central Committee, and Communist Party of the Soviet Union in the wake of Vladimir Lenin's death in January 1924. Though framed as an exposition of Leninism, Zinoviev did not merely summarise Lenin's views, but also drew on Lenin for support for his own commentaries and critiques of contemporary Soviet policy.

== Response ==
Leon Trotsky would respond to this work in The Permanent Revolution who satirizes the work sarcastically comparing Zinoviev to Martin Luther and described reading it as "choking on loose cotton wool".
