= Daniel P. Kessler =

American economist

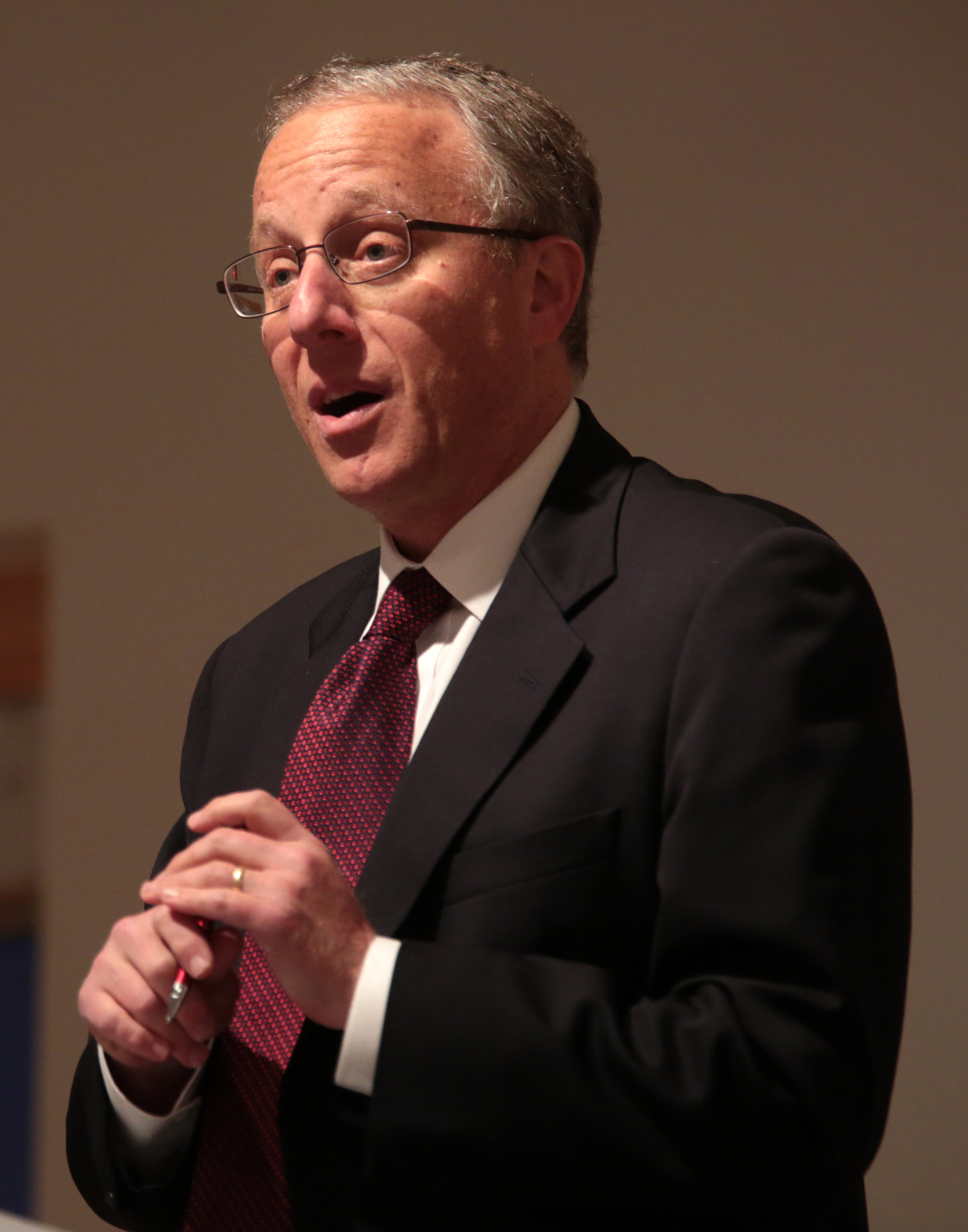
Kessler in 2017.

Daniel P. Kessler is an American academic whose work focuses on health policy and health care finance. He is currently a professor in management at the Stanford Graduate School of Business and a professor of law at Stanford Law School. Additionally, he is professor (by courtesy) of health research and policy at the Stanford University School of Medicine.

== Education ==
Kessler earned his PhD in economics from the Massachusetts Institute of Technology, and his JD from Stanford Law School in 1993.

== Career ==
=== Academia ===
He has taught at Harvard University and the Wharton School of Business, and has served on the faculty of the Stanford Graduate School of Business since 1998. He has been awarded grants from the National Institutes of Health, the National Science Foundation and the California HealthCare Foundation, and won awards from Stanford University, the National Institute for Health Care Management Foundation, and the International Health Economics Association.

In addition to the general fields of antitrust law and law and economics, Kessler's current areas of interest are the effects of tax policy on medical spending, market-based health care reform, and the effects of vertical integration and other shared ownership structures in health service markets on cost and quality of care.

=== Outside academia ===
Outside academia, he is a senior fellow at the Hoover Institution and a research associate at the National Bureau of Economic Research. In addition to authoring and editing books on health reform, he is a contributor to The Wall Street Journal and has been published in both popular and academic periodicals.
