= Hoover Tower =

285-foot structure on the campus of Stanford University

Coordinates: 37.4276°N 122.1669°W

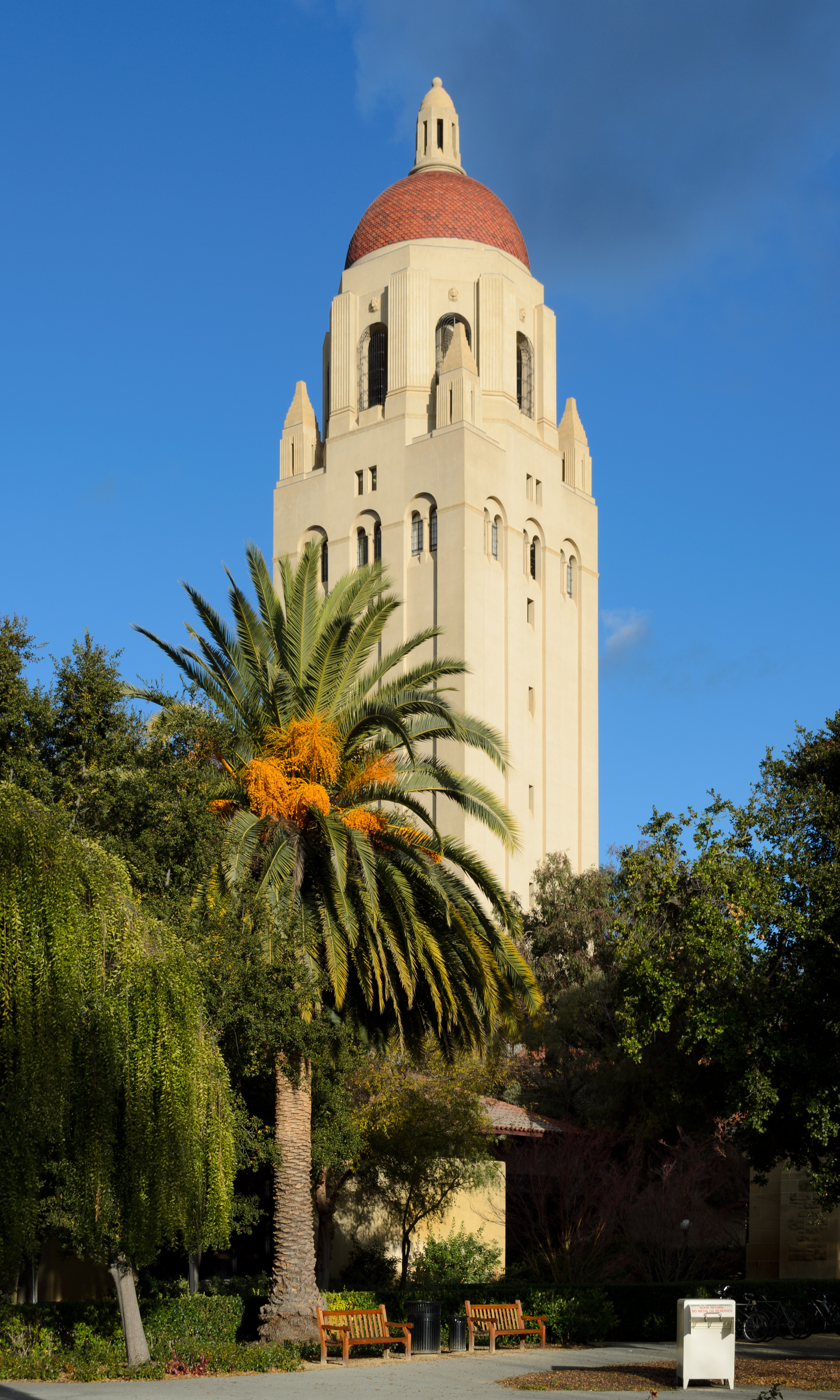
Hoover Tower, viewed from the west in January 2013

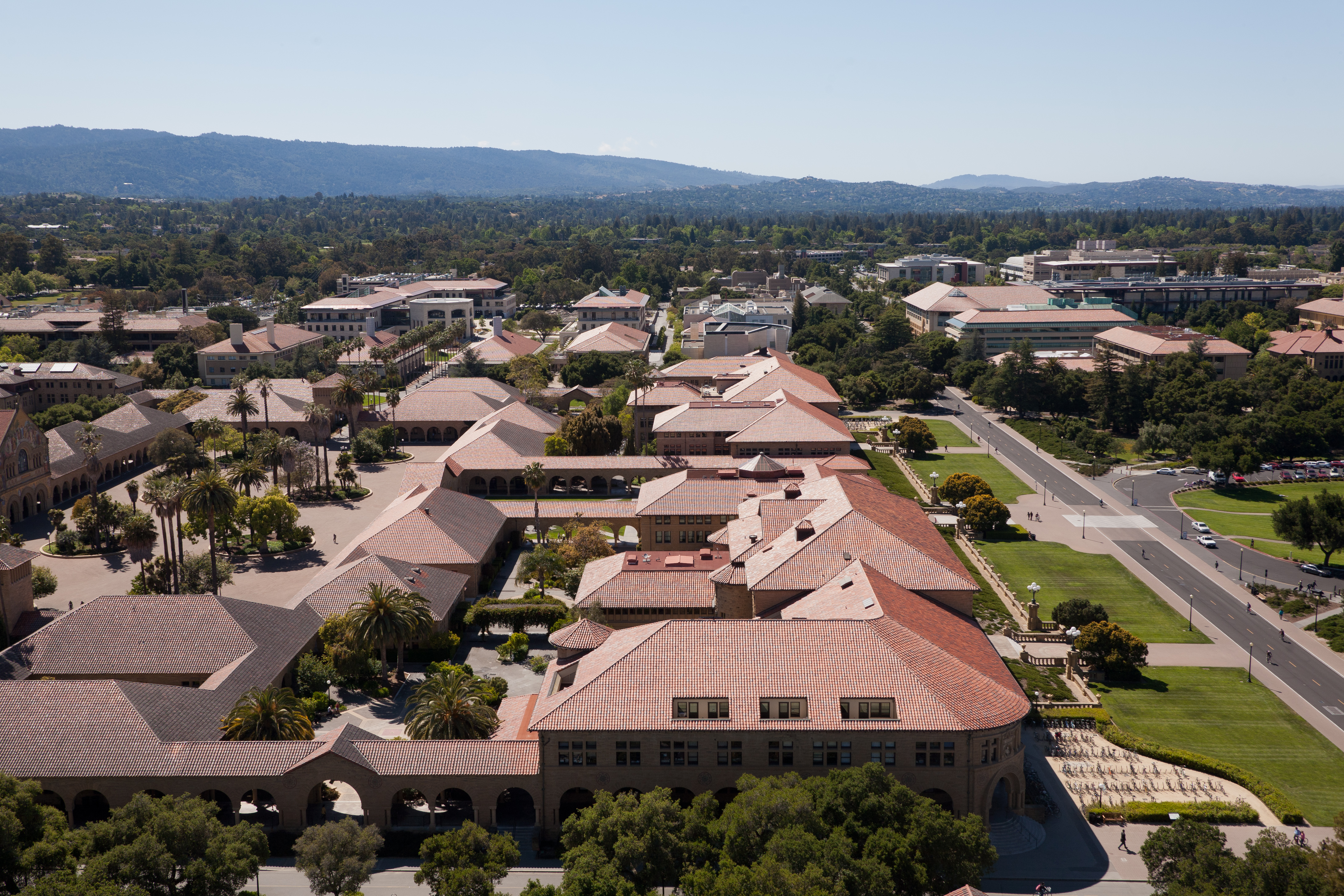
The campus of Stanford University seen from Hoover Tower in May 2011

Hoover Tower is a 285-foot (87 m) structure on the campus of Stanford University in Stanford, California, United States. The tower houses the Hoover Institution Library and Archives, an archive collection founded by Herbert Hoover before he became president of the United States. Hoover had amassed a large collection of materials related to early 20th century history; he donated them to Stanford, his alma mater, to found a "library of war, revolution and peace". Hoover Tower also houses the Hoover Institution research center and think tank.

Hoover Tower, inspired by the tower at the New Cathedral of Salamanca, was finished in 1941, the year of Stanford's 50th anniversary. It was designed by architect Arthur Brown Jr.

The first nine floors of the tower are library stacks and the next three floors are used for offices. Exiled Aleksandr Solzhenitsyn lived on the 11th floor for some time upon invitation by Stanford University before he moved in 1976.

Hoover Tower receives approximately 200 visitors per day, and a nominal fee is charged for non-students or non-faculty. The observation deck platform is 250 feet (76 m) above the ground, and provides an expansive view of the Stanford University campus and surrounding area. On clear days it is possible to see all the way to the distant skyline of San Francisco. The tower's observation deck is open daily from 10:00 a.m. to 4:00 p.m., but closed during academic breaks and finals.

In December 1970, Hoover Tower was struck by lightning, causing a 300-pound (140 kg) ornamental concrete ball to fall from the top of the tower onto a parking lot. In August 2020 the concrete ball at the tower's tip was struck down by an electric storm again, shattering into multiple pieces.

== Carillon ==
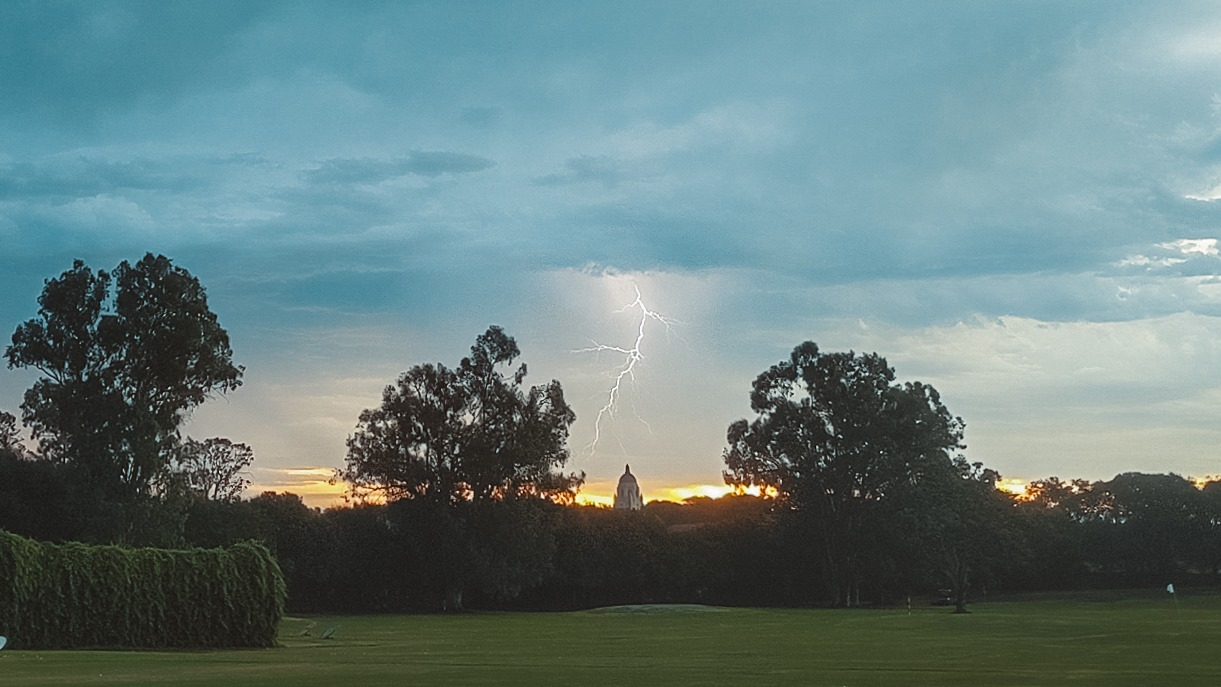
Hoover Tower being hit by lightning on August 16, 2020, destroying the ornamental concrete ball at the tower's top

The tower has a carillon, a gift of the Belgian American Educational Foundation to Stanford.

The original carillon of 35 bells was cast in Tournai, Belgium, by Marcel Michiel for the Belgian Pavilion at the 1939 New York World's Fair; however, the outbreak of World War II and the surrender of Belgium in May 1940 while the fair was still going on left the pavilion in the control of the Belgian government in exile. The bells were offered to the Washington National Cathedral which refused since they had already ordered a larger set and had their tower been finished. In July 1940 Stanford University was given the bells for installation in Hoover Tower. As the tower was not yet complete, the bells were not installed until March 1941 and first played on March 18, 1941 with the first official recital on March 21.

It was tuned and expanded in 2001–2002 with 24 bells cast by the Royal Eijsbouts bell foundry in the Netherlands; 9 of the original bells were recast to make the current total of 48. The largest bell weighs in at 2.5 tons.

== See also ==
- List of carillons in the United States
