= The Stalinist Legacy =

1984 book edited by Tariq Ali

The Stalinist Legacy: Its Impact on 20th-Century World Politics
- First edition
- Author: Tariq Ali
- Language: English
- Subject: Nonfiction
- Genre: Marxism, Influence of Stalinism
- Publisher: Pelican Books
- Publication date: 1984
- Publication place: The United Kingdom
- Media type: Print
- ISBN: 978-0-931477-56-0

The Stalinist Legacy: Its Impact on 20th-Century World Politics is a 1984 book of various authors organized by Pakistani-British author, activist, historian Tariq Ali. The book features articles composed by prominent Anti-Stalinist socialists Isaac Deutscher and Ernest Mandel, Soviet poet Yevgeny Yevtushenko, and Communist bloc leaders Nikita Khrushchev, Josip Tito and Leon Trotsky.

== Synopsis ==
Following the collapse of the Soviet Union in 1991 activists are still haunted by the legacy of Joseph Stalin. The book examines of the origins, impacts, and prominence of Stalinism in modern Russia.

== Content ==
=== Part 1: The Roots of the Problem ===
1. "Social Relations in the Soviet Union" - Leon Trotsky

2. "The 'Professional Dangers' of Power - Christian Rakovsky

3. "What is Bureaucracy?" - Ernest Mandel

4. "Socialism in One Country" - Isaac Deutscher

5. "Marxism and Primitive Magic - ibid.

6. "Trotsky's Interpretation of Stalinism" - Perry Anderson

7. "Was Lenin a Stalinist?" - Marcel Liebman

8. "Stalinist Ideology and Science" - Michael Lowy

=== Part 2:Stalinism in Crisis ===
9. "The Trotskyisys in Vorkuta Prison Camp"

10. "Stalin and the Second World War" - Fernando Claudin

11. "The First Breach: The Excommunication of Yugoslavia" - Josip Tito

12. "Secret Report to the 20th Party Congress of the CPSU" - Nikita Khrushchev

13. "Maoism, Stalinism, and the Chinese Revolution" - Roland Law

14. "The Peculiarities of Vietnamese Communism" - Pierre Rousset

15. "The Tragedy of Indian Communism" - K. Damodaran

16. "Hungary 1956: A Participants Account" - Nicholas Krasso

17. "How They Crushed the Prague Spring of 1968" - Josef Smrkovsky

18. "The Political Culture of Hoxha's Albania" - Arshi Pipa

19. "The Polish Vortex: Solidarity and Socialism" - Oliver MacDonald

20. "Solzhenitsyn: The Witness and the Prophet" - Daniel Singer

Epilogue: "The Heirs of Stalin" - Yevgeny Yevtushenko
