= Hoover Institution Library and Archives =

Research center and archival repository at Stanford University

- Hoover Tower, where the library and archives are located
- 37.42731576019451°N 122.16553572572211°W
- Location: Palo Alto, California, USA
- Type: Research center

Other information
- Affiliation: Hoover Institution, Stanford University
- Website: www.hoover.org/library-archives

The Hoover Institution Library and Archives is a research center and archival repository located at Stanford University, near Palo Alto, California in the United States. Built around a collection amassed by Stanford graduate Herbert Hoover prior to his becoming President of the United States, the Hoover Library and Archives is largely dedicated to the world history of the 20th and 21st centuries. It includes one of the largest collections of political posters in the world.

== Organizational history ==
=== Background ===
U.S. President Herbert Hoover (1874–1964) was an alumnus of Stanford University, graduating in 1895 to become a mining engineer. Successful in business enterprise from an early age in a managerial capacity, Hoover also developed a deep affection for book collecting, building an impressive personal collection.

When World War I erupted, Hoover found himself in Europe, quickly becoming involved in ongoing efforts to provide relief aid to wartime refugees. In 1915 Hoover's professional life intersected with his bibliophilic proclivities when his friend Ephraim D. Adams suggested that Hoover take it upon himself to preserve the records of the organization he directed, the Commission for Relief in Belgium. Hoover accepted this task and began assembling the mass of books, posters, and documents which would become the foundation of the so-called "Hoover War Collection"—earliest incarnation of the Hoover Institution Library and Archives.

Hoover also later recounted that he was further driven in the task of systematic archiving by his own wartime research as food administrator. In the first volume his memoirs, published in 1951, Hoover wrote:

I did a vast amount of reading, mostly on previous wars, revolutions, and peace-makings of Europe and especially the political and economic aftermaths. At one time I set up some research at London, Paris, and Berlin into previous famines in Europe to see if there had developed any ideas on handling relief and pestilence. ... I was shortly convinced that gigantic famine would follow the present war. The steady degeneration of agriculture was obvious. ... I read in one of Andrew D. White's writings that most of the fugitive literature of comment during the French Revolution was lost to history because no one set any value on it at the time, and that without such material it became very difficult or impossible to reconstruct the real scene. Therein lay the origins of the Library on War, Revolution and Peace at Stanford University.

Andrew D. White donated his vast collection of ephemera from the French Revolution to Cornell University in 1891. A full account of the founding of the Hoover Institution Library and Archives is provided by George H. Nash in "Herbert Hoover and Stanford University," published by the Hoover Institution Press in 1988.

In February 1919, Congress established a new agency known as the American Relief Administration as a mechanism for the supply of food aid to the hungry people of post-war Europe. Herbert Hoover was tapped by President Woodrow Wilson to head this agency, and the records of this great enterprise were also incorporated into Hoover's archival holdings.

The initial holdings documented the end of World War I and the peace conference at the end of the war.

=== Development ===
The reading room at the Hoover Institution Archives in June 2011

Starting in 1919, Hoover donated the collected materials to Stanford, his alma mater, along with funds to maintain and develop the documents. The collection was called the Hoover War Collection and later the Hoover War Library. In August 1920 the first permanent curator of the collection, Frank A. Golder, headed a team which traveled across Europe to acquire materials. A massive number of books, pamphlets, documents, and posters were acquired, crated, and shipped back to California on behalf of the project. By 1923 more than 40,000 items had been obtained for the collection. The documents were initially housed within the main Stanford Library, but by 1929 the collection had reached 1.4 million items and space was becoming a problem. In 1941 Hoover Tower was completed as a repository for the growing collection, which was eventually named the Hoover Institution and Library on War, Revolution and Peace.

Staff members in subsequent decades have continued to expand the collection systematically. The current holdings include 6,000 separate collections that encompass an estimated 50 million original documents.

=== Key collections ===
The archive is a valuable resource for the following subjects related to Russia: the rise of political parties, Imperial Russian diplomatic archives, the revolutionary movement, Asiatic Russia and its colonization, the "Okhrana", the Russo-Japanese War, and Russia's participation in World War I.

Other special collections include the Hoover Institution/Research Libraries Group, Inc. (RLG)/Russian State Archival Service Cataloging Project and the Soviet Communist Party Archives Microfilming Project. Additionally, the papers of Pyotr Wrangel are stored at the Hoover Institution.

Digitized audiovisual recordings and transcripts of more than 1,500 Firing Line episodes were contributed to the American Archive of Public Broadcasting via external links from The Hoover Institution Library and Archives at Stanford University.

The Hoover Institution hosted the diaries of Chiang Kai-shek and his son Chiang Ching-kuo from 2004 to 2023, until they were transferred to Academia Historica in Taiwan. In 2021, it acquired Wang Jingwei's personal papers and collections.

== See also ==
- Ba'ath Party archives, formerly housed at Hoover
- Hoover Institution
- Stanford University Libraries
