= Barry R. Weingast =

American political scientist and economist

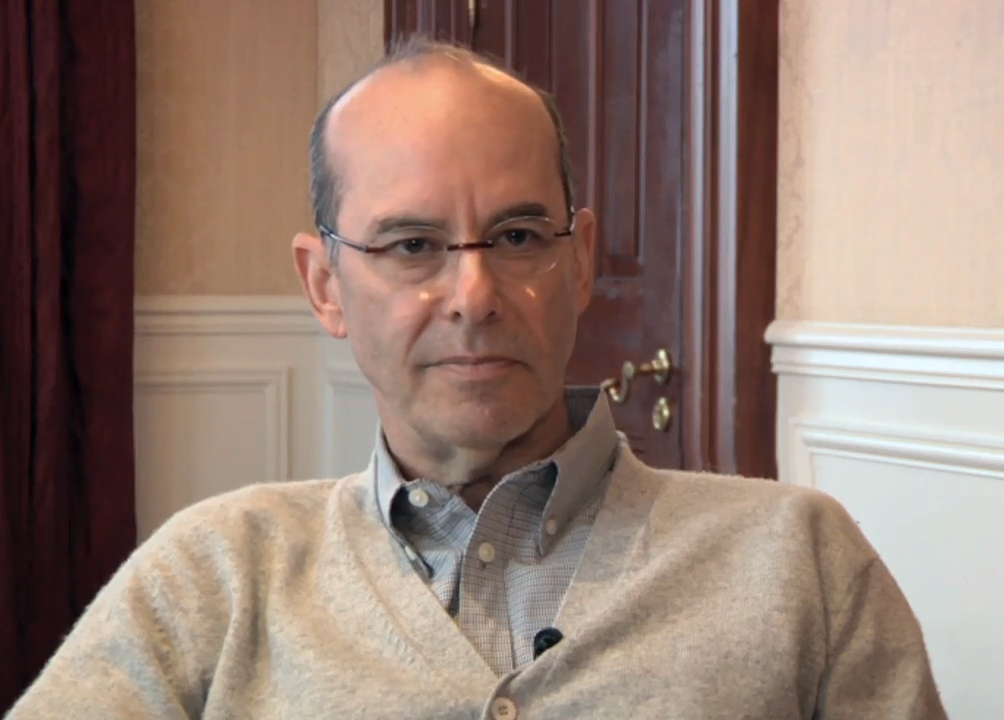
- Weingast in 2013
- Born: Barry Robert Weingast; September 1, 1952 (age 74); Los Angeles, California, U.S.
- Education: University of California, Santa Cruz (BA); California Institute of Technology (PhD)
- Occupations: Political scientist; economist

Barry Robert Weingast (born September 1, 1952) is an American political scientist and economist, who is currently the Ward C. Krebs Family Professor at Stanford University and a Senior Fellow at the Hoover Institution. Weingast's research concentrates on the relationship between politics and economics, particularly economic reform, regulation, and the political foundation of markets.

== Early life ==
He was born in Los Angeles, California. After his secondary education, he studied at the University of California, Santa Cruz where he obtained a B.A. in mathematics in June 1973. Thereafter, he moved on to graduate studies in economics at the California Institute of Technology, which awarded him a Ph.D. in June 1978 for his thesis, "A representative legislature and regulatory agency capture."

== Academic career ==
Following his graduate studies, he became an assistant professor of economics at the Washington University in St. Louis (WUSTL) in 1977, where he also worked as a research associate at the Center for the Study of American Business before he was promoted to associate professor in 1983 and to full professor in 1986. Later, Weingast became affiliated with the Hoover Institution, first as a senior research fellow in 1987 and then as a senior fellow in 1990, which he still holds. After he left WUSTL in 1988, he was appointed as professor of political science at Stanford University in 1992, reflecting his transition from economics to political science after he left WUSTL. His current position, the Ward C. Krebs Family Professor, was awarded to him by Stanford University in 1997.

In addition to his professorship in political science, Weingast has held a courtesy appointment in economics at Stanford University since 1989 and works at several institutes affiliated with Stanford University, including the Stanford Center for International Development, the Stanford Center for International Studies, and the Woods Institute for the Environment. Before that, he was a visiting professor or scholar at the University of California, Berkeley, Cornell Law School, Virginia Law School and the Graduate School of Business at Stanford University. Weingast has also been a fellow of the American Academy of Arts and Sciences since 1996.

In the past, he has acted as the chair and as the Director of Graduate Studies of Department of Political Science at Stanford University and as the Director and President of the International Society for the New Institutional Economics. He is also a member of the American Economic Association, American Political Science Association and the Economic History Association, among others, and he is on the board of directors of the Journal of Institutional and Theoretical Economics, Constitutional Political Economy, Journal of Policy Reform, Public Choice and Business and Politics.

== Research ==
His research interests focus on political economy, new institutional economics, regulation, and the application of rational choice theory to legal, legislative, and constitutional institutions. The bibliographic database IDEAS/RePEc ranks him among the top 5% of economists according to different metrics, including average rank score, number of citations, and number of distinct works. His most cited research article, co-authored with Nobel Memorial Prize laureate Douglass C. North in 1989, analyzes the development of constitutional arrangements in 17th-century England after the Glorious Revolution of 1688 and posits based on evidence from capital markets that new institutions successfully enabled the government to commit credibly to upholding property rights. Further important research contributions to economics by Weingast include the following:

- an explanation for inefficient pork barrel politics based on public choice theory in which the divergence between the economic and political definitions of costs and benefits, districting mechanisms, and project financing by generalized taxation systematically bias public decisions in favor of inefficiently large projects;
- an exploration of the principles of the political control of bureaucratic decisions via administrative procedures and "oversight" (monitoring, rewarding, and punishment of bureaucratic behavior), which hypothesizes that the purpose of substantial parts of administrative law is to support the maintenance of political control of policymaking;'
- the conclusion that medieval merchant guilds allowed the rulers of trade centers to commit credibly to the security of foreign merchants by developing trade relations and securing merchants' property rights, based on the interpretation of historical evidence in light of a repeated-game model;
- the interpretation of federalism as a governance solution of the state aimed at the credible preservation of market incentives by preventing the state from compromising on future economic success and from bailing out future failures by the decentralization of information and authority as well as through interjurisdictional competition.

Weingast's recent work includes: the central role of violence in the political-economics of development (with Gary W. Cox and North); the political and constitutional foundations of Ancient Athens (with Federica Carugati and Josiah Ober).
