= Hoover Institution =

American political think tank

The Hoover Institution on War, Revolution, and Peace

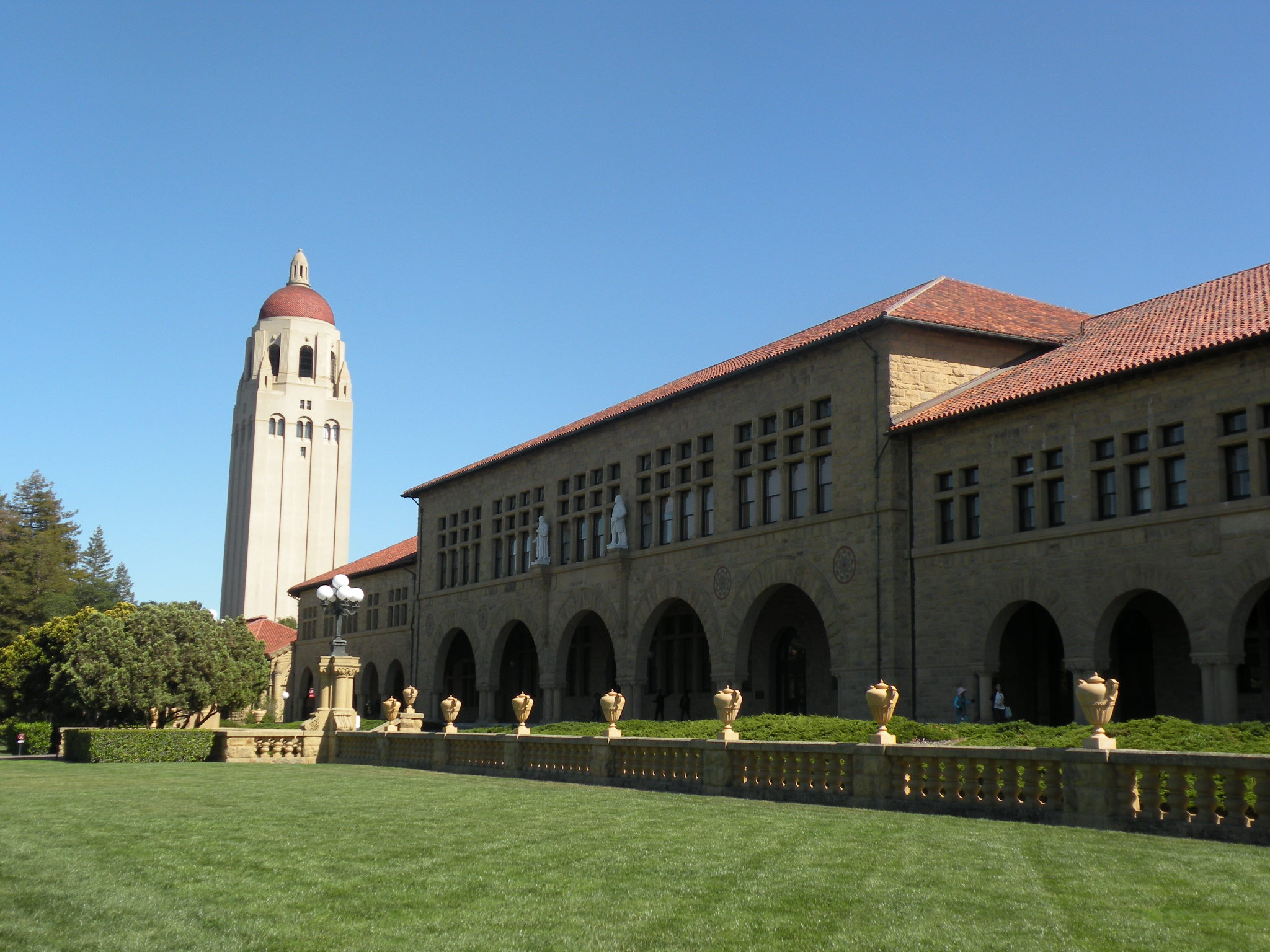
- Hoover Tower in May 2014
- Abbreviation: Hoover
- Formation: June 1919; 107 years ago
- Founder: Herbert Hoover
- Type: Public policy think tank
- Tax ID no.: 94-1156365
- Legal status: 501(c)(3) organization
- Purpose: Public policy research in economics, history, and national security.
- Professional title: The Hoover Institution on War, Revolution, and Peace
- Location(s): 434 Galvez Mall; Stanford, California (Stanford University), U.S. 94305
- Coordinates: 37.43°N 122.17°W
- Director: Condoleezza Rice
- Parent organization: Stanford University
- Subsidiaries: Hoover Institution Press; Hoover Institution Library and Archives; Uncommon Knowledge; Battlegrounds; Defining Ideas; Hoover Digest
- Revenue: $111.4 million (2025)
- Expenses: $130 million (2025)
- Endowment: $921 million (2025)
- Award: National Humanities Medal
- Website: hoover.org
- Formerly called: Hoover War Collection

The Hoover Institution on War, Revolution, and Peace (formerly the Hoover Institute and Library on War, Revolution, and Peace), commonly known as the Hoover Institution, is an American public policy think tank which promotes personal and economic liberty, free enterprise, and limited government. While the institution is officially a unit of Stanford University, it maintains an independent board of overseers and relies on its own income and donations. It is widely described as conservative, although its directors have contested the idea that it is partisan.

The institution began in 1919 as a library founded by Stanford alumnus Herbert Hoover prior to his presidency in order to house his archives gathered during World War I. The well-known Hoover Tower was built to house the archives, then known as the Hoover War Collection (now the Hoover Institution Library and Archives), and contained material related to World War I, World War II, and other global events. The collection was renamed and transformed into a research institution ("think tank") during the mid-20th century. Its mission, as described by Herbert Hoover in 1959, is "to recall the voice of experience against the making of war, and by the study of these records and their publication, to recall man's endeavors to make and preserve peace, and to sustain for America the safeguards of the American way of life."

It has staffed numerous jobs in Washington for Republican presidents from Richard Nixon to Donald Trump. It has provided work for people who previously had important government jobs. Notable Hoover fellows and alumni include Nobel Prize laureates Henry Kissinger, Milton Friedman, and Gary Becker; economist Thomas Sowell; scholars Niall Ferguson and Richard Epstein; former Speaker of the House of Representatives Newt Gingrich; and former secretary of defense James N. Mattis. In 2020, former secretary of state Condoleezza Rice became the institution's director. It divides its fellows into separate research teams to work on various subjects, including Economic Policy, History, Education, and Law. It publishes research by its own publishing house, the Hoover Institution Press.

In 2021, Hoover was ranked as the 10th most influential think tank in the world by Academic Influence. It was ranked 22nd on the "Top Think Tanks in United States" and 1st on the "Top Think Tanks to Look Out For" lists of the Think Tanks and Civil Societies Program that same year.

== History ==
=== Founding ===
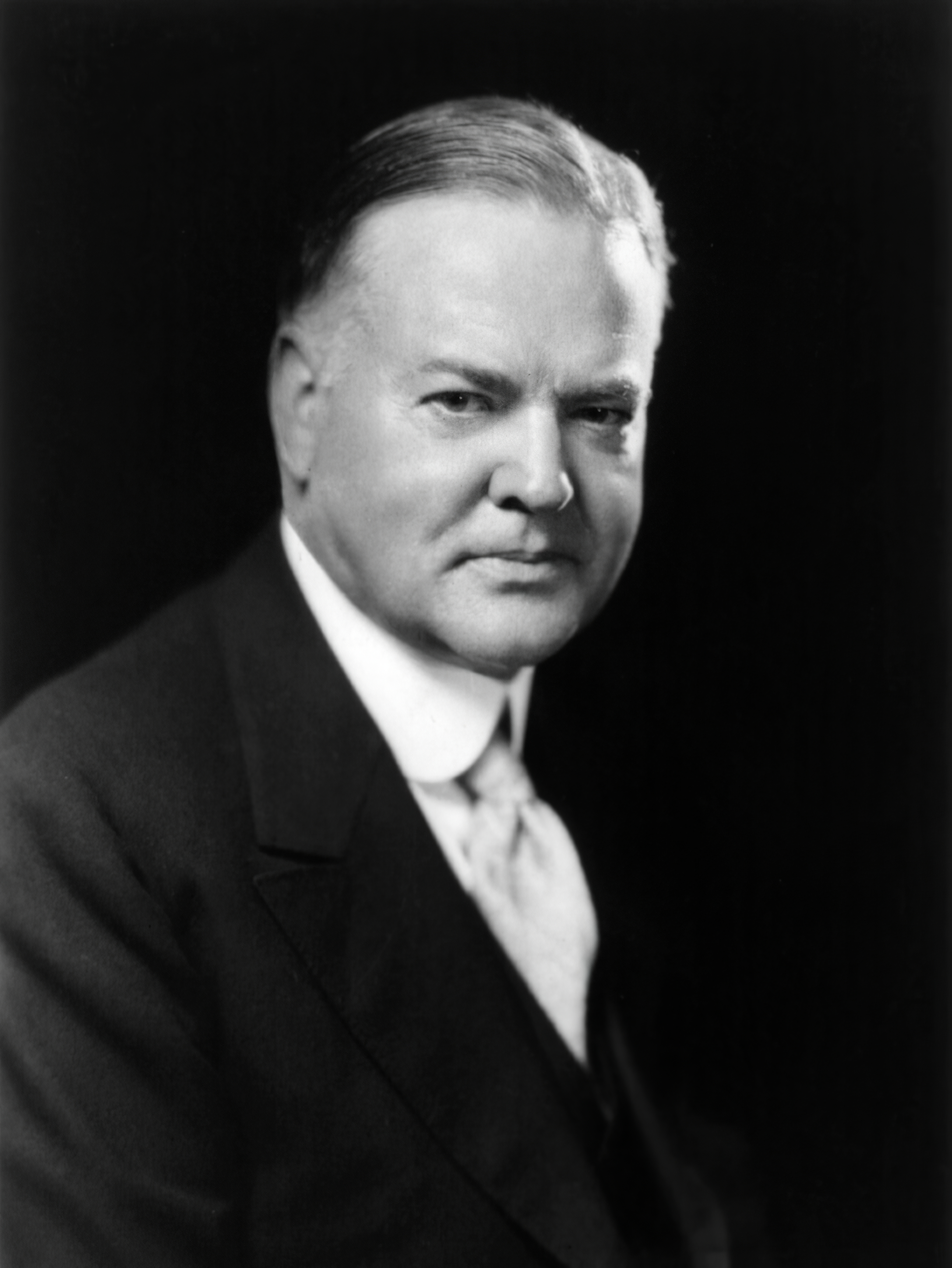
President Herbert Hoover, the founder of the Hoover Institution

In June 1919, Herbert Hoover, then a wealthy engineer who was one of Stanford University's first graduates, sent a telegram offering Stanford president Ray Lyman Wilbur $50,000 in order to assist the collection of primary materials related to World War I, a project that became known as the Hoover War Collection. Assisted primarily by gifts from private donors, the Hoover War Collection flourished during its early years. In 1922, the collection became known as the Hoover War Library, now known as the Hoover Institution Library and Archives, and includes a variety of rare and unpublished material, including the files of the Okhrana and a plurality of government documents produced during the war. It was housed originally in the Stanford Library, separate from the general stacks. In his memoirs, Hoover wrote:

I did a vast amount of reading, mostly on previous wars, revolutions, and peace-makings of Europe and especially the political and economic aftermaths. At one time I set up some research at London, Paris, and Berlin into previous famines in Europe to see if there had developed any ideas on handling relief and pestilence. ... I was shortly convinced that gigantic famine would follow the present war. The steady degeneration of agriculture was obvious. ... I read in one of Andrew D. White's writings that most of the fugitive literature of comment during the French Revolution was lost to history because no one set any value on it at the time, and that without such material it became very difficult or impossible to reconstruct the real scene. Therein lay the origins of the Library on War, Revolution and Peace at Stanford University.

=== 20th century ===
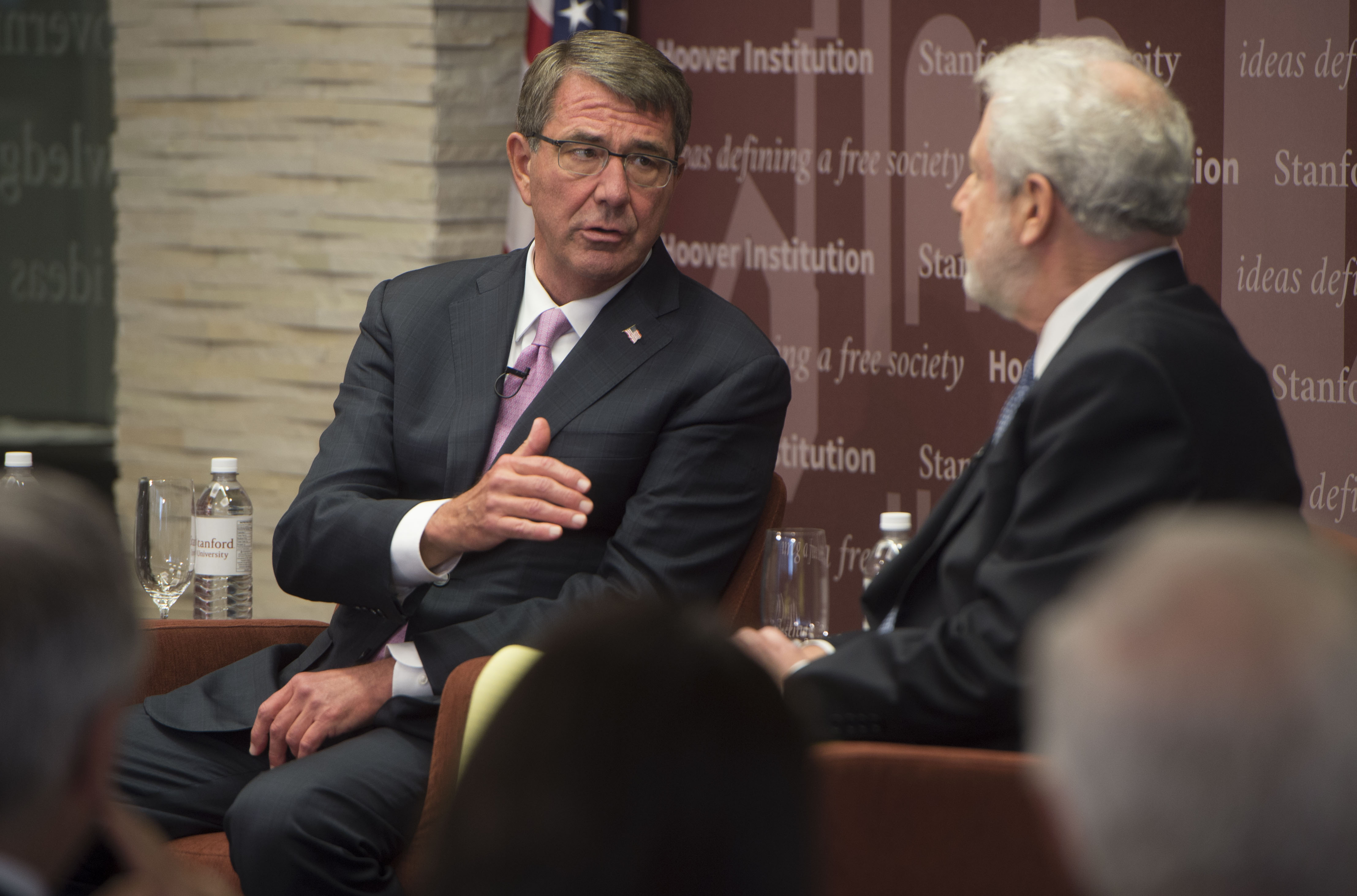
Former U.S. Secretary of Defense Ash Carter speaks about defense innovation at the institution in Washington, D.C., in September 2016

By 1926, the Hoover War Library was the largest library in the world devoted to World War I, including 1.4 million items and too large to house in the Stanford University Library, so the university allocated $600,000 for the construction of the Hoover Tower, which was designed to be its permanent home independent of the Stanford Library system. The 285-foot tall tower was completed in 1941 on date of the university's golden jubilee. The tower has since been a well-recognized part of the Stanford campus.

In 1956, former President Hoover, in conjunction with the Institution and Library, began a major fundraising campaign that transitioned the organization to its current form as a research institution as well as archive.

In 1957, the Hoover Institution and Library was renamed the Hoover Institution on War, Revolution and Peace, its current name. In 1959, Stanford's Board of Trustees officially established the Hoover Institution as "an independent institution within the frame of Stanford University".

In 1960, W. Glenn Campbell was appointed director and substantial budget increases soon resulted in corresponding increases in acquisitions and related research projects. In particular, the Chinese and Russian collections grew considerably. Despite student unrest during the 1960s, the institution continued to develop closer relations with Stanford University.

In 1975, Ronald Reagan, who was Governor of California at that time, was designated as Hoover's first honorary fellow. He donated his gubernatorial papers to the Hoover library. During that time the Hoover Institution had a general budget of $3.5 million a year. In 1976, one third of Stanford University's book holdings were housed at the Hoover library. At that time, it was the largest private archive collection in the United States.

For his presidential campaign in 1980, Reagan engaged at least thirteen Hoover scholars to assist the campaign in multiple capacities. After Reagan won the election, more than thirty current or former Hoover Institution fellows worked for the Reagan administration in 1981.

In 1989, Campbell retired as director of Hoover and replaced by John Raisian, a change that was considered the end of an era. Raisan served as director until 2015, and was succeeded by Thomas W. Gilligan.

=== 21st century ===
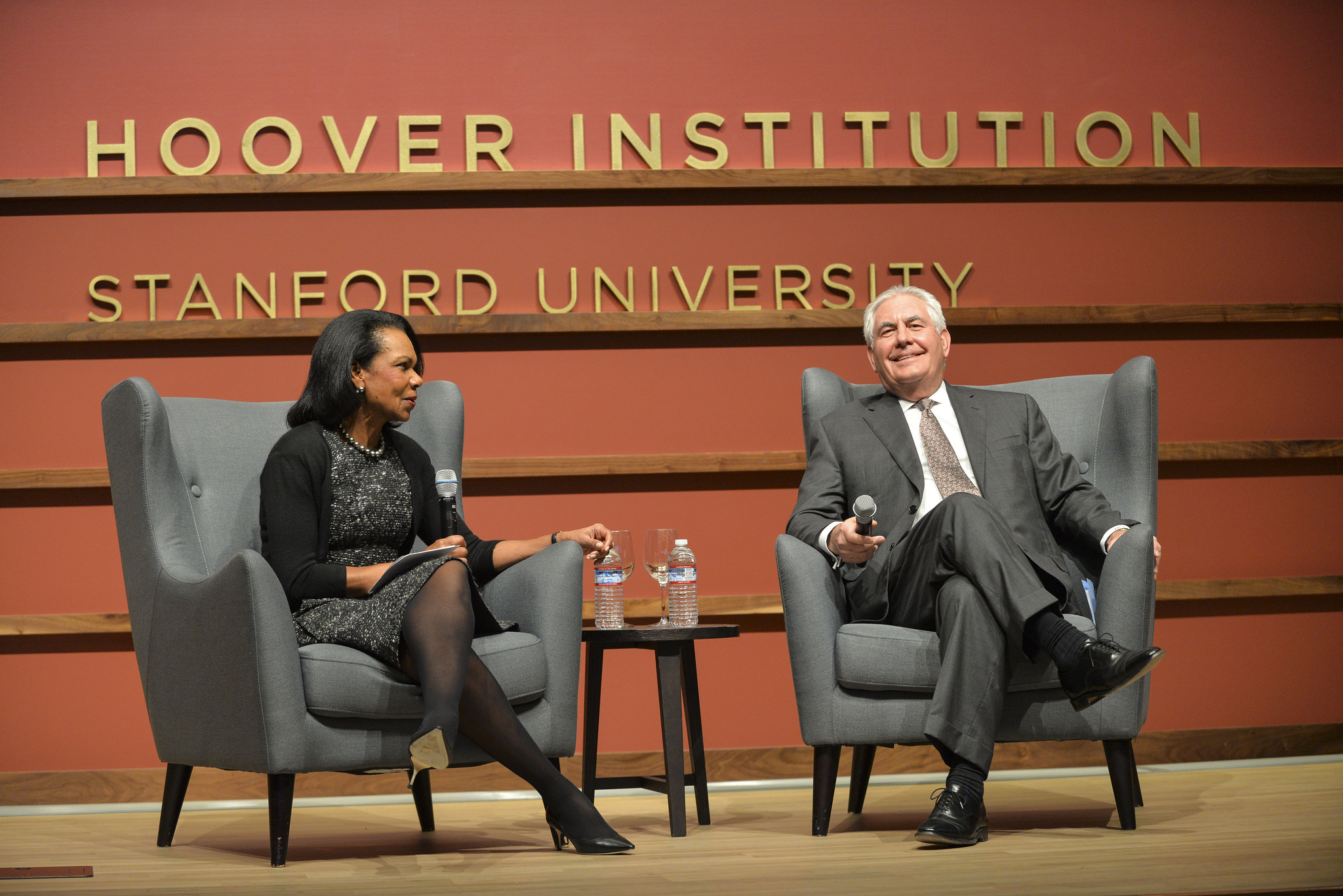
Former Secretaries of State Condoleezza Rice and Rex Tillerson during a Hoover forum in January 2018

In 2001, Hoover Senior fellow Condoleezza Rice joined the George W. Bush administration, serving as National Security Advisor from 2001 to 2005 and as Secretary of State from 2005 to 2009. In 2006, President George W. Bush awarded the National Humanities Medal to the Hoover Institution.

In August 2017, the David and Joan Traitel Building was inaugurated. The ground floor is a conference facility with a 400-seat auditorium and the top floor houses the Hoover Institution's headquarters.

At any given time, as of 2017, the Hoover Institution has as many as 200 resident scholars known as fellows. They are an interdisciplinary group studying political science, education, economics, foreign policy, energy, history, law, national security, health and politics. Some have joint appointments as lecturers on the Stanford faculty.

The first Trump administration maintained relations with the institution during his presidency, and several Hoover employees became senior advisors or were hired for jobs in his administration, including Secretary of Defense James N. Mattis, who was the Davies Family Distinguished Visiting Fellow at Hoover from 2013 to 2016, where he studied leadership, national security, strategy, innovation, and the effective use of military force.

In March 2019, Mattis returned to his post at Hoover. Distinguished Visiting Fellow Kevin Hassett became the first chairman of Trump's Council of Economic Advisors (CEA). The CEA chief principal economist, Josh Rauh, took leave from his Hoover Institution fellowship. After the third CEA chairman Tyler Goodspeed resigned in 2021, he went to Hoover.

In February 2020, the Hoover board of trustees brought in senior Trump economic officials for off-the-record forecasts. According to The New York Times, "The president’s aides appeared to be giving wealthy party donors an early warning of a potentially impactful contagion at a time when Mr. Trump was publicly insisting that the threat was nonexistent." The board members spread the bad news and the stock market had a selloff.

In 2020, Condoleezza Rice succeeded Thomas W. Gilligan as director.

In November 2020, Scott Atlas, a Hoover fellow, who was known for opposing public health measures as a major Trump advisor during the COVID-19 pandemic, was condemned by a Stanford University faculty vote.

In January 2021, during Stanford University faculty senate discussions on closer collaboration between the university and the Institution in 2021, Rice "addressed campus criticism that the Hoover Institution is a partisan think tank that primarily supports conservative administrations and policy positions" by sharing "statistics that show Hoover fellows contribute financially to both political parties on an equal basis", according to the university's newsletter.

According to DeSmog, the Hoover Institution accepts scientific consensus on climate change, but has long opposed climate action. Some Hoover fellows downplay climate change.

== Campus ==
The Institution has libraries which include materials from both World War I and World War II, including the collection of documents of President Herbert Hoover, which he began to collect at the Paris Peace Conference of 1919. Thousands of Persian books, official documents, letters, multimedia pieces and other materials on Iran's history, politics and culture can also be found at the Stanford University library and the Hoover Institution library.

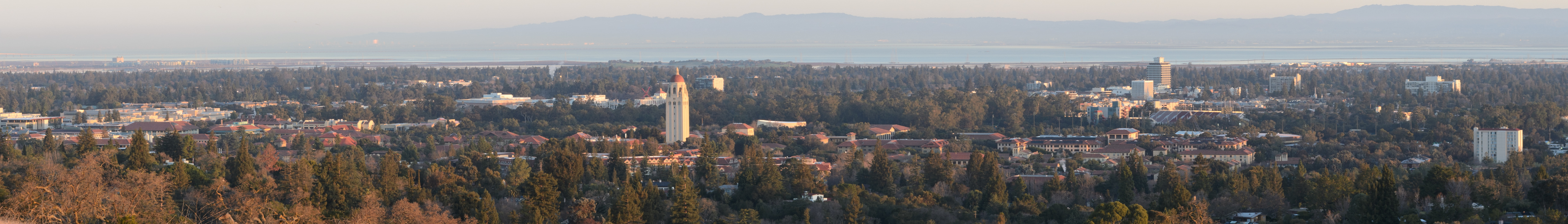
View of the Hoover Institution's headquarters, including the Hoover Tower, among the Stanford University campus

== Publications ==
The Hoover Institution's in-house publisher, Hoover Institution Press, produces publications on public policy topics, including the quarterly periodicals Hoover Digest, Education Next, China Leadership Monitor, and Defining Ideas. The Hoover Institution Press previously published the bimonthly periodical Policy Review, which it acquired from The Heritage Foundation in 2001. Policy Review ceased publication with its February–March 2013 issue. The Hoover Institution also co-publishes the Stanford Emerging Technology Review (SETR), a technology education report for policymakers, with the Stanford University School of Engineering.

The Hoover Institution Press also publishes books and essays by Hoover Institution fellows and other Hoover-affiliated scholars.

== Funding ==
The Hoover Institution receives nearly half of its funding from private gifts, primarily from individual contributions, and the other half from its endowment.

Funders of the organization include the Taube Family Foundation, the Koret Foundation, the Howard Charitable Foundation, the Sarah Scaife Foundation, the Walton Foundation, the Lynde and Harry Bradley Foundation, and the William E. Simon Foundation.

== Members ==
In May 2018, the Hoover Institution's website listed 198 fellows. Fellowship appointments do not require the approval of Stanford tenure committees.

Below is a list of directors and some of the more prominent fellows, former and current.

=== Directors ===
- Ephraim D. Adams, 1920–25
- Ralph H. Lutz, 1925–44
- Harold H. Fisher, 1944–52
- C. Easton Rothwell, 1952–59
- W. Glenn Campbell, 1960–89
- John Raisian, 1989–2015
- Thomas W. Gilligan, 2015–2020
- Condoleezza Rice, 2020–present

=== Honorary fellows ===
- Friedrich Hayek, philosopher and Nobel laureate in economics (deceased)
- Ronald Reagan, former President of the United States (deceased)
- Aleksandr Solzhenitsyn, Soviet dissident and Nobel laureate in literature (deceased)
- Margaret Thatcher, former Prime Minister of the United Kingdom (deceased)

=== Distinguished fellows ===
- George Shultz, former U.S. Secretary of State (deceased)

=== Senior fellows ===
- Fouad Ajami, political scientist, former director of the Middle East Studies Program at Johns Hopkins University (deceased)
- Scott Atlas, health care policy scholar and physician, former professor and former Chief of Neuroradiology at Stanford University School of Medicine
- Richard V. Allen, former U.S. National Security Advisor (deceased)
- Martin Anderson, former advisor to Richard Nixon and author of The Federal Bulldozer (deceased)
- Robert Barro, economist, Harvard University
- Gary Becker, 1992 Nobel Memorial Prize in Economic Sciences laureate and professor, University of Chicago (deceased)
- Joseph Berger, theoretical sociologist, Stanford University (deceased)
- Peter Berkowitz, political scientist, Stanford University
- Russell Berman, professor, German Studies and Comparative Literature, Stanford University
- Michael Boskin, chairman, Council of Economic Advisers in the George H. W. Bush administration
- David W. Brady, political scientist, Stanford University
- Bruce Bueno de Mesquita, political scientist, professor at New York University
- Elizabeth Cobbs, historian, novelist, and documentary filmmaker
- John H. Cochrane, economist, Stanford Graduate School of Business
- William Damon, professor of education, Stanford University
- Larry Diamond, professor of international studies, Stanford University
- Frank Dikötter, chair and professor of humanities, University of Hong Kong
- Sidney Drell, theoretical physicist and arms control expert, Stanford University (deceased)
- Darrell Duffie, Dean Witter Distinguished Professor of Finance at Stanford Graduate School of Business
- John B. Dunlop, expert on Soviet and Russian politics
- Richard Epstein, legal scholar, New York University
- Martin Feldstein, senior fellow at the George F. Baker Professor of Economics at Harvard University (deceased)
- Niall Ferguson, historian and professor, Harvard University
- Chester E. Finn Jr., education and public policy professor, Vanderbilt University
- Morris Fiorina, political science professor, Stanford University
- Milton Friedman, economics professor, University of Chicago, and 1976 Nobel Memorial Prize in Economic Sciences laureate (deceased)
- Timothy Garton Ash, European history professor, University of Oxford, and columnist, The Guardian
- Jack Goldsmith, legal scholar, Harvard Law School
- Stephen Haber, economic historian and political scientist, Stanford University
- Robert Hall, economics professor, Stanford University
- Victor Davis Hanson, classics professor emeritus, California State University, Fresno
- Eric Hanushek, economist
- David R. Henderson, economist
- Caroline Hoxby, economist
- Bobby Ray Inman, retired admiral
- Shanto Iyengar, professor of political science, and director of the Political Communication Laboratory at Stanford University
- Ken Jowitt, historian
- Kenneth L. Judd, economist
- Daniel P. Kessler, scholar of health policy and health care finance
- Stephen D. Krasner, international relations professor
- Edward Lazear, economist (Deceased)
- Gary D. Libecap, Bren Professor of Corporate Environmental Policy and of Donald R. Bren School of Environmental Science
- Seymour Martin Lipset, political sociologist (deceased)
- Harvey Mansfield, political scientist
- Michael W. McConnell, legal scholar, former judge, professor at Stanford University
- Michael McFaul, political scientist, United States Ambassador to Russia
- H.R. McMaster, former National Security Advisor
- Thomas Metzger, sinologist
- James C. Miller III, economist
- Terry M. Moe, professor of political science at Stanford University
- Thomas Gale Moore, economist (deceased)
- Kevin M. Murphy, economist
- Norman Naimark, historian
- Douglass North, 1993 Nobel laureate in economics (deceased)
- Lee Ohanion, economist
- William J. Perry, former U.S. Secretary of Defense
- Paul E. Peterson, scholar on education reform
- Alvin Rabushka, political scientist
- Raghuram Rajan, Katherine Dusak Miller Distinguished Service Professor of Finance at the University of Chicago's Booth School
- Condoleezza Rice, former U.S. Secretary of State
- Henry Rowen, economist (deceased)
- Thomas J. Sargent, 2011 Nobel laureate in economics, professor at New York University
- Robert Service, historian
- John Shoven, economist
- Abraham David Sofaer, scholar, former legal advisor to the U.S. Secretary of State
- Thomas Sowell, economist, author, columnist
- Michael Spence, 2001 Nobel laureate in economics
- Richard F. Staar, political scientist, historian (Deceased)
- Shelby Steele, author, columnist
- John B. Taylor, former U.S. Undersecretary of the Treasury for international affairs
- Eugene Volokh, professor of law emeritus at UCLA School of Law (effective July 1, 2024)
- Barry R. Weingast, political scientist
- Bertram Wolfe, author, scholar, former communist, (deceased; 1896–1977)
- Amy Zegart, political scientist

=== Senior research fellows ===
- John H. Bunzel, expert in the field of civil rights, race relations, higher education, US politics, and elections (deceased)
- Robert Hessen, historian (deceased)
- James Stockdale, Navy Vice Admiral, Medal of Honor recipient, 1992 US vice presidential candidate (deceased)
- Edward Teller, physicist (deceased)
- Charles Wolf, Jr, economist (deceased)

=== Research fellows ===
- Ayaan Hirsi Ali, author, scholar and former politician
- Clint Bolick, Associate Justice of the Supreme Court of Arizona
- Jennifer Burns, historian
- Lanhee Chen, political scientist, health policy expert, former policy director for Mitt Romney
- Robert Conquest, historian (deceased)
- David Davenport, former president of Pepperdine University
- Williamson Evers, education researcher
- Paul R. Gregory, Cullen Professor Emeritus in the Department of Economics at the University of Houston
- Alice Hill, former federal prosecutor, judge, special assistant to the president, and senior director for the National Security Council
- Charles Hill, lecturer in International Studies (Deceased)
- Tim Kane, economist
- Herbert S. Klein, historian
- Tod Lindberg, foreign policy expert
- Alice L. Miller, political scientist
- Shavit Matias, former deputy attorney general of Israel
- Abbas Milani, political scientist
- Henry I. Miller, physician
- Elena Pastorino, economist
- Russell Roberts, economist, author
- Kori Schake, foreign policy expert, author
- Kiron Skinner, associate professor of international relations and political science, author
- Peter Schweizer, author (former fellow)
- Antony C. Sutton, author of Western Technology and Soviet Economic Development (3 vol), fellow from 1968 to 1973
- Bruce Thornton, American classicist
- Tunku Varadarajan, writer and journalist
- Hsiao-ting Lin, sinologist

=== Distinguished visiting fellows ===
- John Abizaid, former commander of the U.S. Central Command (former fellow)
- Spencer Abraham, former U.S. Senator and Secretary of Energy (former fellow)
- Pedro Aspe, Mexican economist, former secretary of finance
- Michael R. Auslin, American writer, policy analyst, historian, and Asia expert
- Michael D. Bordo, Canadian economist, professor of economics at Rutgers University
- Charles Calomiris, financial policy expert, author, and professor at Columbia Business School
- Arye Carmon, Founding President and senior fellow at the Israel Democracy Institute (IDI)
- Elizabeth Economy, C. V. Starr senior fellow and director for Asia studies at the Council on Foreign Relations
- James O. Ellis, former commander, United States Strategic Command
- James Goodby, author and former American diplomat
- Jim Hoagland, American journalist and two-time recipient of the Pulitzer Prize
- Toomas Hendrik Ilves, former President of Estonia
- Raymond Jeanloz, professor of earth and planetary science and of astronomy
- Josef Joffe, publisher-editor of the German newspaper Die Zeit
- Henry Kissinger, former U.S. Secretary of State in the administrations of presidents Richard Nixon and Gerald Ford (deceased)
- Mike Kuiken, Vice Chair, U.S.-China Economic and Security Review Commission
- James Mattis, former commander, U.S. Central Command and former Secretary of Defense
- Allan H. Meltzer, American economist (Deceased)
- Edwin Meese, former U.S. Attorney General
- David C. Mulford, former United States Ambassador to India, former Vice-Chairman International of Credit Suisse
- Joseph Nye, American political scientist, co-founder of the international relations theory of neoliberalism
- Sam Nunn, former United States Senator from Georgia
- George Osborne, British Conservative Party politician, former Chancellor of the Exchequer and former Member of Parliament (MP) for Tatton
- Andrew Roberts, British historian and journalist, Visiting Professor at the Department of War Studies, King's College London
- Peter M. Robinson, American author, research fellow television host, former speechwriter for then-Vice President George H. W. Bush and President Ronald Reagan
- Gary Roughead, former Chief of Naval Operations
- Donald Rumsfeld, former Secretary of Defense (deceased)
- Christopher Stubbs, an experimental physicist
- William Suter, former Clerk of the Supreme Court of the United States
- Kevin Warsh, former governor of the Federal Reserve System
- Pete Wilson, former Governor of California

=== Visiting fellows ===
- Charles Blahous, U.S. public trustee for the Social Security and Medicare programs
- Robert J. Hodrick, U.S. economist specialized in International Finance
- Markos Kounalakis, Greek-American journalist, author, scholar, and the Second Gentleman of California
- Bjørn Lomborg, Danish author, president of Copenhagen Consensus Center
- Ellen R. McGrattan, professor of economics at the University of Minnesota
- Afshin Molavi, Iranian-American author and expert on global geo-political risk and geo-economics
- Charles I. Plosser, former president of the Federal Reserve Bank of Philadelphia
- Raj Shah, former White House Deputy Press Secretary, former Deputy Assistant to the President
- Alex Stamos, computer scientist, former chief security officer at Facebook
- John Yoo, Korean-American attorney, law professor, former government official, author
- Glennys Young, American international relations scholar

=== Media fellows ===
- Tom Bethell, journalist
- Sam Dealey, journalist, former editor-in-chief of Washington Times
- Christopher Hitchens, journalist (deceased)
- Deroy Murdock, journalist
- Mike Pride, editor emeritus of the Concord Monitor and former administrator of the Pulitzer Prizes
- Christopher Ruddy, CEO of Newsmax Media

=== National fellows ===
- Mark Bils, macroeconomist, National Fellow 1989–90
- Stephen Kotkin, historian, National Fellow 2010–11

== See also ==
- List of Stanford University Centers and Institutes
